= 393rd Regiment =

393rd Regiment may refer to:

- 393rd (Hampshire) Heavy Anti-Aircraft Regiment, Royal Artillery
- 393rd Infantry Regiment, United States

== See also ==
- 393rd (disambiguation)
