= 76th Searchlight Regiment, Royal Artillery =

76th Searchlight Regiment, RA
- Royal Artillery cap badge
- Active: 20 May 1940–23 September 1944
- Branch: British Army
- Type: Searchlight Regiment
- Role: Air Defence
- Engagements: Battle of Britain; The Blitz

The 76th Searchlight Regiment, Royal Artillery (76th S/L Rgt) was a British Army air defence unit during World War II. It was engaged during the Battle of Britain and The Blitz, defending Royal Air Force airfields and the towns of southern England.

== Origin ==
76th was the first Territorial Army (TA) searchlight (S/L) regiment to be formed following the outbreak of war: the others existing at that time were converted pre-war Royal Engineers or infantry battalions, which were all transferred to the Royal Artillery (RA) in August 1940. The regiment was officially formed on 20 May 1940 at 217th Searchlight Training Regiment (SLTR) at Bradbury Lines, Hereford. It was to comprise Regimental Headquarters (RHQ) and 474th–477th S/L Batteries. Of these, 474th (from cadres supplied by Edinburgh searchlight units) and 475th had already been formed under orders issued in February, while 476th and 477th were to be newly formed by 217th SLTR from cadres provided by 71st (East Lancashire) and 59th (Warwickshire) S/L Rgts respectively. The first Commanding Officer (CO) was Lieutenant-Colonel A.T. Colthart.

However, these plans were immediately changed: the CO was posted away within two weeks, and 476th and 477th S/L Btys were disbanded in June and July, the personnel of 477th being posted to help reform 1st S/L Rgt after its return from Dunkirk. Two new batteries were formed: 492nd S/L Bty from 217th SLTR, and 493rd S/L Bty from 222nd SLTR at Yeovil. Then in August 475 S/L Bty was exchanged with 485 S/L Bty from the reforming 2nd S/L Rgt, giving 76th S/L Rgt the following composition from 24 July:

- RHQ
- 474th S/L Bty
- 485th S/L Bty
- 492nd S/L Bty
- 493rd S/L Bty

Of these, 474th S/L Bty had already seen service defending Southampton in the early stages of the Battle of Britain. The new CO was Major P.J. Slater, DFC, TD, transferred from 59th S/L Rgt and promoted to Lt-Col, and the regiment came under the orders of 55th AA Brigade, covering the ports of Plymouth, Devon and Falmouth, Cornwall in 5th AA Division. By the end of August the regiment's lights were deployed across Dorset, South Wiltshire and South Somerset, with RHQ at Pythouse, Tisbury, Wiltshire.

== The Blitz ==
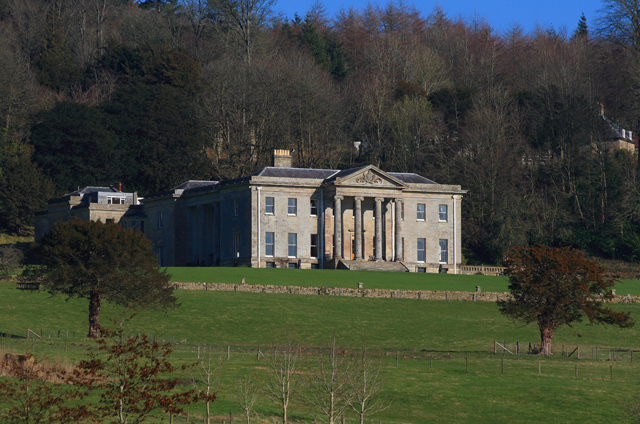
Pythouse, West Tisbury: 76th S/L Regimental HQ 1940–41

During the autumn, as the night-bombing 'Blitz' against British cities got under way, there was some movement among the regiment's detachments. While 474th and 485th Btys deployed at the standard 3000-yard intervals, 493rd Bty was in four six-light clusters and 485th was in three-light clusters. The cluster system was an attempt to improve the chances of picking up enemy bombers and keeping them illuminated for engagement by AA guns or Night fighters. Eventually, one light in each cluster was to be equipped with searchlight control (SLC) radar and act as 'master light', but the radar equipment was still in short supply. 485th and 493rd Btys received their first Gun-Laying Radar Mk I sets in December and became operational at the end of the year. The regiment was fully deployed in three-light clusters by mid-January

In November 1940 76th S/L Rgt came under 64th AA Bde in 8th AA Division, both being new formations created in the rapidly-expanding Anti-Aircraft Command. The brigade's prime responsibility was airfield defence in South West England.

In January 1941 474th Battery moved to Alderbury in Wiltshire, but its role was unchanged. It began to receive improved GL Mark I E/F gun-laying radar equipped with elevation-finding equipment. It was also engaged in experiments at RAF Boscombe Down to see how searchlights combined with AA guns could deal with low-flying attacks. By the spring the battery manned clusters of three searchlights at Boscombe Down and RAF Middle Wallop. Meanwhile, 485th and 493rd Btys were engaged in large-scale trials for AA Command and RAF Fighter Command.

== Mid-war ==
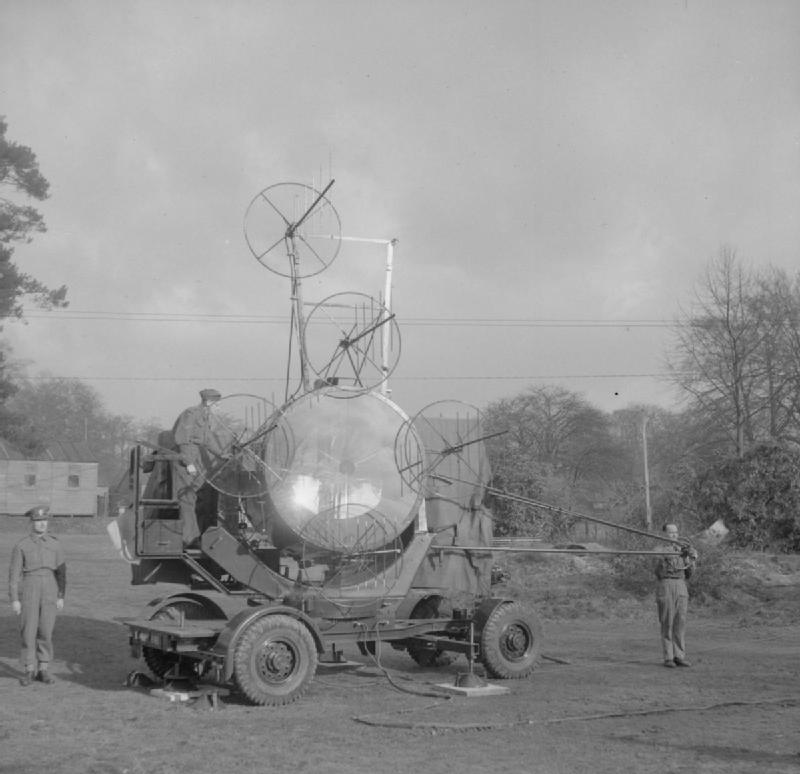
150 cm S/L with AA Radar No 2

After the Blitz ended in May 1941, the regiment continued its home defence role in AA Command. In September it began to receive its first purpose-built SLC radar (AA Radar No 2) in sufficient numbers to allow the sites to be 'declustered' into single-light sites spaced at 6000-yard intervals in a 'Killer Belt' cooperating with night-fighters.

In November 1941, the regiment was relieved by 2nd S/L Rgt and redeployed to Devon, with RHQ at Bolham, Devon, to take over sites from 88th and 89th S/L Rgts. For example, 485th Bty was deployed from Taunton to Axminster, with eight sites in the 'Indicator Belt' along the coast and 16 SLC sites in the Killer Belt. On 28 November one of its sites was bombed (with no casualties or damage) when it illuminated a hostile aircraft.

By May 1942 the regiment had transferred to 60th AA Bde, and then before October 1942 to 69th AA Bde, both in 8th AA Division in SW England.

At the end of September 1942 the AA Divisions were disbanded, being replaced by new AA Groups more closely aligned with the Groups of Fighter Command. 76th Searchlight Regiment remained in 69th AA Bde, now part of 3 AA Group, coinciding with No. 10 Group RAF covering SW England and South Wales.

== Break-up ==
See main article 474th Searchlight Battery, Royal Artillery

On 20 February 1943, 474th S/L Bty ceased to be part of 76th S/L Rgt and became an independent unit training for a mobile role in Operation Overlord, the planned invasion of continental Europe.

The rest of 76th S/L Rgt remained in 69th AA Bde until Spring 1944 when it transferred back to 64th AA Bde.

As the threat from the Luftwaffe waned after D Day, the War Office warned in June 1944 that AA Command would have to release manpower to provide reinforcements to 21st Army Group fighting in North West Europe. The run-down began in the autumn: RHQ of 76th S/L Rgt with 485, 492 and 493 S/L Btys commenced disbandment at Woolacombe, North Devon, on 23 September 1944, completing the process on 3 March 1945. 474 (Independent) S/L Bty disbanded on 15 November 1945.

== External sources ==
- British Military History
- Royal Artillery 1939–1945
