= 8th Anti-Aircraft Division =

- Formation sign of the division.
- Active: 16 October 1940 – 30 September 1942
- Country: United Kingdom
- Branch: British Army
- Type: Anti-Aircraft Division
- Role: Air Defence
- Size: 4–5 Brigades
- Part of: I AA Corps
- Garrison/HQ: Bristol
- Engagements: The Blitz; Baedeker Blitz

The 8th Anti-Aircraft Division (8th AA Division) was an air defence formation of the British Army during the early years of the Second World War. It defended South West England during The Blitz and the Luftwaffe 'hit and run' raids, but only had a short career.

== Mobilisation ==
The 8th Anti-Aircraft Division was one of five new divisions created on 1 November 1940 by Anti-Aircraft Command to control the growing anti-aircraft (AA) defences of the United Kingdom. The division was formed by splitting the 5th AA Division, with the new formation taking responsibility for the City of Bristol and the counties of Somerset, Dorset, Devon and Cornwall. Potential targets in this area included the Bristol Aeroplane Company factory and airfield at Filton, and the Royal Navy dockyards at Devonport (Plymouth) and Portland.

The Divisional headquarters (HQ) was at Bristol and the first General Officer Commanding (GOC) was Major-General Robert Allen, who was transferred from commanding the 5th AA Division. The division formed part of I AA Corps, which was created at the same time to cover Southern England and Wales. The fighting units, organised in four AA Brigades, consisted of Heavy (HAA) and Light (LAA) gun units and Searchlight (S/L) units of the Royal Artillery, with major concentrations of HAA guns in the Bristol and Plymouth Gun Defence Areas (GDAs)

== The Blitz ==
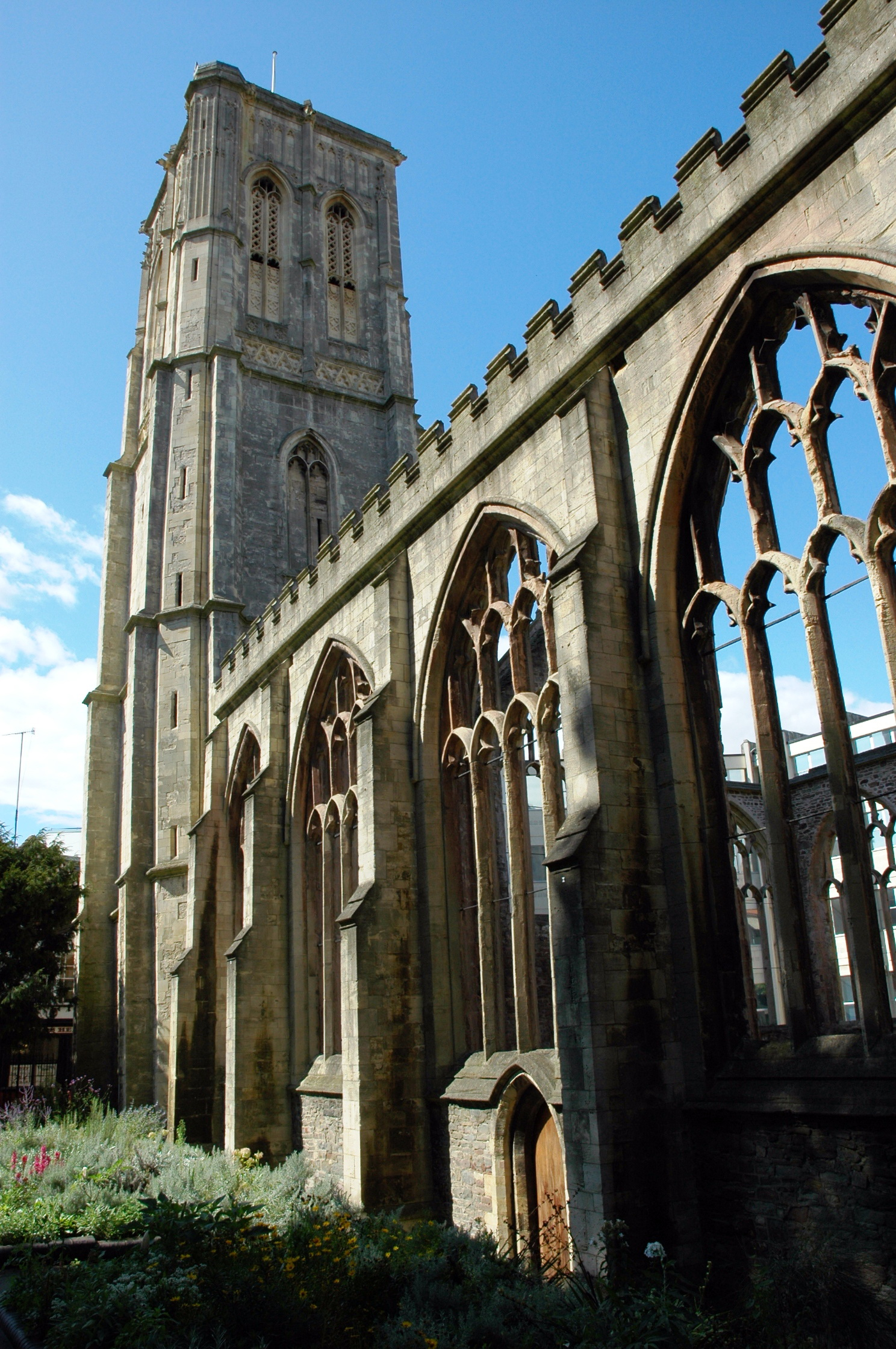
The Blitzed ruins of Temple Church, Bristol

When the 8th AA Division was formed the Luftwaffe's night Blitz on British cities was already under way. There had previously been daylight raids during the Battle of Britain, notably on Bristol and Portland on 25 September 1940, now the night attacks were stepped up both against London and smaller cities, with the ports of Bristol and Plymouth receiving frequent raids, particularly heavy in March 1941 (the Bristol Blitz and Plymouth Blitz).

In 1939 the scale of HAA guns (3-inch and the newer 3.7-inch and 4.5-inch guns) allocated to the Bristol GDA (covering Bristol and Avonmouth) had been 56, and this was increased to 80 in 1940, but by the end of February 1941 only 36 were in place. This increased to 68 a month later, though further additions to the establishment were already being called for. The position on LAA gunsites was worse: only small numbers of Bofors 40 mm guns were available at the start of the Blitz, and most LAA detachments had to make do with Light machine guns (LMGs).

=== Order of Battle ===
The division's composition during the Blitz was as follows:

- 46th AA Brigade – Bristol
  - 76th (Gloucestershire) HAA Rgt
  - 23rd LAA Rgt – to 5th AA Division by May 1941
  - 66th (Gloucesters) S/L Rgt (part)
  - 68th (Monmouthshire Regiment) S/L Rgt
- 55th AA Brigade – Plymouth and Falmouth, Cornwall
  - 56th (Cornwall) HAA Rgt
  - 118th HAA Rgt (part) – new regiment raised in December 1940; to 9th AA Division by May 1941
  - 58th (Argyll and Sutherland Highlanders) LAA Rgt – part deployed at Plymouth, part under 65th AA Brigade at Southampton; left to join 11th Support Group in May 1941
  - 81st S/L Rgt – new unit formed in November 1940 from existing S/L Bty of Cornwall Fortress Royal Engineers
  - 82nd S/L Rgt – new unit formed in November 1940 from existing S/L Bty of Dorset Fortress Royal Engineers

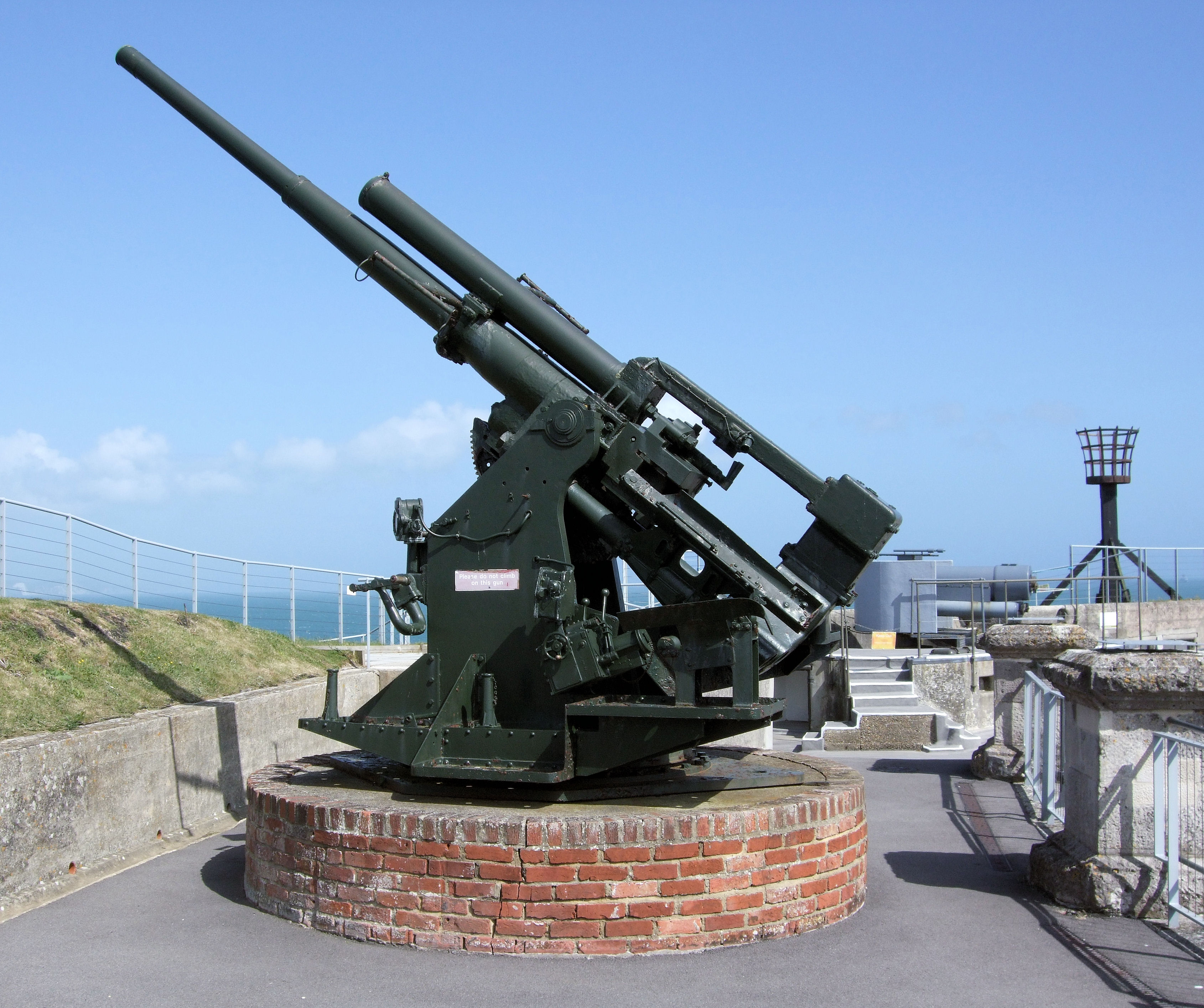
3.7-inch HAA gun preserved at Nothe Fort overlooking Portland Harbour

- 60th AA Brigade – Exeter, Yeovil and Portland
  - 104th HAA Rgt
  - 44th LAA Rgt
  - 66th S/L Rgt (part)
- 64th AA Brigade – Airfield sector layout
  - 35th LAA Rgt
  - 2nd S/L Rgt
  - 3rd (Ulster) S/L Rgt – converted into 4th (Ulster) LAA Rgt in January 1942
  - 76th S/L Rgt
  - 85th S/L Rgt – new unit raised in January 1941
- 9th AA 'Z' Rgt – equipped with Z Battery rocket launchers, formed by the 8th AA Division in January 1941
- 8th AA Divisional Signals, Royal Corps of Signals (RCS) – formed at Bristol as duplicate of 5th AA Divisional Signals at Reading, Berkshire
- 8th AA Divisional Royal Army Service Corps (RASC)
  - 191st, 915th and 917th Companies
- 8th AA Divisional Company, Royal Army Medical Corps (RAMC)
- 8th AA Divisional Workshop Company, Royal Army Ordnance Corps (RAOC)

== Mid-War ==
By October 1941 the availability of S/L control radar was sufficient to allow AA Command's S/L sites to be 'declustered' into single-light sites spaced at 10,400-yard intervals in 'Indicator Belts' along the coast and approaches to the GDAs, and 'Killer Belts' at 6,000 yards (5,500 m) spacing to cooperate with the RAF's Night-fighters.

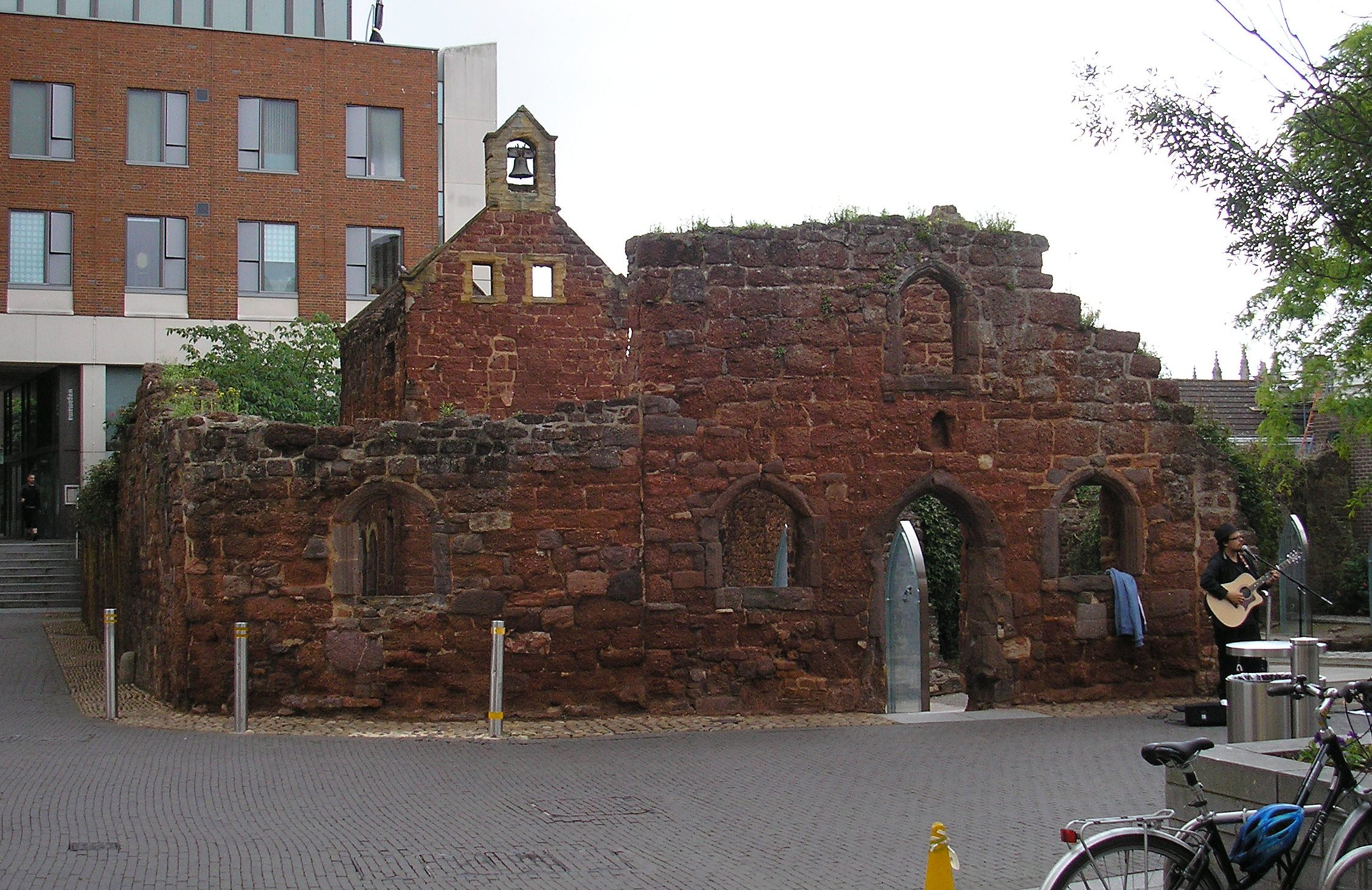
The ruins of St Catherine's Almshouses, Exeter, preserved amongst modern buildings as a memorial of the Blitz

Early in 1942 the Luftwaffe began a new wave of attacks on British cities (the Baedeker Blitz): Exeter and undefended Bath were hit in March, April and May, and Weston-super-Mare in June. New GDAs were established at Exeter, Taunton, Bath and Salisbury.

Newly formed AA units joined the division, the HAA and support units increasingly becoming 'Mixed' units, indicating that women of the Auxiliary Territorial Service (ATS) were fully integrated into them. At the same time, experienced units were posted away to train for service overseas. This led to a continual turnover of units, which accelerated in 1942 with the preparations for the invasion of North Africa (Operation Torch) and the need to transfer AA units to counter the Baedeker raids and the Luftwaffe's hit-and-run attacks against South Coast towns.

Those AA units in the War Office (WO) Reserve rostered for overseas deployment were lent back to AA Command when not required for training. One of these, 103rd HAA Rgt, was moved down from Merseyside, which was rarely attacked by this stage of the war, to reinforce the 8th AA Division in Cornwall in April 1942, establishing its batteries at St Ives, Truro and Penzance under the 55th AA Brigade.

In July, the 103rd HAA Rgt was sent for a short attachment to the 11th AA Brigade (the mobile training brigade in Hampshire) and was relieved by 79th (Hertfordshire Yeomanry) HAA Rgt which had just completed training with the 11th AA Brigade. The 79th HAA Regiment occupied sites at Hayle, Truro and Penzance on 14 July and the Penzance and Truro guns were in action against raiders early the next morning. The deployment lasted three weeks before the regiment left for further training and the 103rd HAA Rgt returned.

In West Cornwall the main threat was from low level daylight 'hit and run' raids by single engined Luftwaffe aircraft (such as attacks by pairs of Focke-Wulf Fw 190s on St Ives on 28 August and Truro on 7 September), which were difficult for HAA guns to engage. Night raids on Truro on 24 September and on Penzance two nights later were engaged by the regiment with both HAA and light machine guns.

In August 1942, the 64th AA Brigade was transferred from the 8th AA Division to the 3rd AA Division, a HQ brought down from Scotland to handle the increased workload along the South Coast.

=== Order of Battle ===
During this period the division was composed as follows (temporary attachments omitted):

- 46th AA Brigade
  - 59th (Essex Regiment) HAA Rgt – from the 6th AA Division December 1941; to WO control as part of the field force March 1942; later to Operation Torch
  - 76th (Gloucestershire) HAA Rgt – to the 69th AA Brigade by December 1941
  - 104th HAA Rgt – to the 5th AA Division in December 1941
  - 112th HAA Rgt – from the 11th AA Division by May 1941; to the 9th AA Division by December 1941
  - 116th HAA Rgt – new unit formed in November 1940; to the 55th AA Brigade by December 1941
  - 119th HAA Rgt – from the 1st AA Division by May 1941; to the 64th AA Brigade by December 1941
  - 133rd (Mixed) HAA Rgt – new unit formed September 1941
  - 140th HAA Rgt – new unit formed December 1941; to the 69th AA Brigade by May 1942
  - 150th (Mixed) HAA Rgt – new unit formed February 1942
  - 165th HAA Rgt – new unit formed July 1942
  - 36th LAA Rgt – from the 1st AA Division by May 1941; to the 69th AA Brigade Summer 1941
  - 47th LAA Rgt – from the 69th AA Brigade by December 1941; to Operation Torch 1942
  - 133rd LAA Rgt – from the 69th AA Brigade July 1942
  - 66th S/L Rgt – to the 69th AA Brigade Summer 1941
  - 68th S/L Rgt – to the 69th AA Brigade Summer 1941
  - 1st AA 'Z' Rgt – from the 1st AA Division by May 1941, returned by December 1941
- 55th AA Brigade
  - 56th HAA Rgt– as above; left for India in December 1941
  - 79th (Hertfordshire Yeomanry) HAA Rgt – from the 11th AA Brigade for July 1942
  - 103rd HAA Rgt – from the 4th AA Division May 1942
  - 116th HAA Rgt – from the 46th AA Brigade by December 1941
  - 162nd (Mixed) HAA Rgt – new unit formed June 1942
  - 166th (Mixed) HAA Rgt – new unit formed August 1942
  - 36th LAA Rgt – from the 69th AA Brigade by December 1941; left for India in April 1942
  - 44th LAA Rgt – from the 9th AA Division January 1942 (previously the 60th AA Brigade ); left for India in March 1942
  - 46th LAA Rgt – from the 9th AA Division by May 1941
  - 55th (Devonshire) LAA Rgt – from WO Reserve in April 1942; later to Ceylon
  - 137th LAA Rgt – new unit formed February 1942
  - 29th (Kent) S/L Rgt – from the 6th AA Division January 1942; to the 60th AA Brigade June 1942
  - 81st S/L Rgt – as above; converted into unbrigaded 131st LAA Rgt in March 1942
  - 82nd S/L Rgt – to the 64th AA Brigade December 1941
  - 85th S/L Rgt – from the 64th AA Brigade by December 1941; converted into 132nd LAA Rgt in the 5th AA Division in March 1942
  - 9th AA 'Z' Rgt – from the 60th AA Brigade by December 1941
- 60th AA Brigade
  - 108th HAA Rgt – from Orkney and Shetland Defences (OSDEF) by September 1942
  - 12th (Finsbury Rifles) LAA Rgt – from the 1st AA Division by May 1941; left AA Command and joined WO Reserve June 1941, later to Persia and Iraq Command (PAIFORCE)
  - 44th LAA Rgt – to the 9th AA Division by December 1941; then to the 55th AA Brigade January 1942
  - 67th LAA Rgt – from the 3rd AA Division by September 1942
  - 29th (Kent) S/L Rgt – from the 55th AA Brigade June 1942
  - 74th (Essex Fortress) S/L Rgt – from the 6th AA Division January 1942
  - 76th S/L Rgt – from the 64th AA Brigade December 1941; to the 69th AA Brigade August 1942
  - 88th S/L Rgt – new unit formed in March 1941
  - 89th S/L Rgt – new unit formed in March 1941; converted into 133rd LAA Rgt March 1942; to the 69th AA Brigade June 1942
  - 9th AA 'Z' Rgt – to the 55th AA Brigade by December 1941
- 64th AA Brigade – Left August 1942
  - 98th HAA Rgt – from the 4th AA Division May 1942
  - 119th HAA Rgt – from the 46th AA Brigade by December 1941; to the 9th AA Division June 1942
  - 35th LAA Rgt – left in November 1941 for Singapore, where it was captured in February 1942
  - 75th (Middlesex) LAA Rgt – joined from unbrigaded by December 1941; left in July 1942, later in invasion of Sicily (Operation Husky)
  - 87th LAA Rgt – new unit formed October 1941; to the 9th AA Division June 1942
  - 127th (Queens) LAA Rgt – converted from 63rd (Queens) S/L Rgt, joined July 1942
  - 2nd S/L Rgt – as above
  - 3rd S/L Rgt – to the 69th AA Brigade December 1941
  - 76th S/L Rgt – to the 60th AA Brigade December 1941
  - 82nd S/L Rgt – from the 55th AA Brigade December 1941
  - 85th S/L Rgt – to the 55th AA Brigade by December 1941
- 69th AA Brigade – new formation joined June 1941
  - 76th (Gloucestershire) HAA Rgt – from the 46th AA Brigade by December 1941; to Operation Torch by November 1942
  - 140th HAA Rgt – from the 46th AA Brigade by May 1942
  - 24th LAA Rgt – from the 5th AA Division; to India 1942
  - 36th LAA Rgt – from the 46th AA Brigade on formation; to the 55th AA Brigade by December 1941
  - 47th LAA Rgt – from the 9th AA Division on formation; to the 46th AA Brigade by December 1941
  - 72nd LAA Rgt – from the 9th AA Division May 1942; left July 1942, later in Operation Torch
  - 87th LAA Rgt – from the 9th AA Division (previously the 64 AA Brigade) in August 1942
  - 133rd LAA Rgt – from the 60th AA Brigade June 1942, to the 46 AA Brigade July 1942
  - 3rd S/L Rgt – from the 60th AA Brigade December 1941; converted into unbrigaded 4th (Ulster) LAA Rgt in January 1942
  - 66th S/L Rgt – from the 46th AA Brigade on formation
  - 68th S/L Rgt – from the 46th AA Brigade on formation
  - 76th S/L Rgt – from the 60th AA Brigade August 1942

The increased sophistication of Operations Rooms and communications was reflected in the growth in support units, which attained the following organisation by May 1942:

- 8th AA Division Mixed Signal Unit HQ, RCS
  - HQ No 1 Company
    - 8th AA Division Mixed Signal Office Section
    - 307th AA Gun Operations Room Mixed Signal Section (Bristol GDA)
    - 46th AA Brigade Signal Office Mixed Sub-Section
    - 69th AA Brigade Signal Office Mixed Sub-Section
    - 110th RAF Fighter Sector Sub-Section (RAF Colerne)
    - 19th AA Line Maintenance Section
  - HQ No 2 Company
    - 55th AA Brigade Signal Office Mixed Sub-Section
    - 116th RAF Fighter Sector Sub-Section (RAF Portreath)
    - 306th AA Gun Operations Room Mixed Signal Section (Plymouth GDA)
    - 318th AA Gun Operations Room Mixed Signal Section (Falmouth)
    - 20th AA Line Maintenance Section
  - HQ No 3 Company
    - 60th AA Brigade Signal Office Mixed Sub-Section
    - 120th RAF Fighter Sector Sub-Section (RAF Exeter)
    - 64th AA Brigade Signal Office Mixed Sub-Section
    - 113th RAF Fighter Sector Sub-Section (RAF Middle Wallop)
    - 305th AA Gun Operations Room Mixed Signal Section (Portland)
    - 21st AA Line Maintenance Section
- HQ 8th AA Div RASC
  - 191st, 915th, 917th Companies
- 8th AA Div RAMC
- 8th AA Div Workshop Company, RAOC
- 8th AA Div Radio Maintenance Company, RAOC

The RAOC companies became part of the new Royal Electrical and Mechanical Engineers (REME) during 1942.

== Disbandment ==
A reorganisation of AA Command in October 1942 saw the AA divisions disbanded and replaced by a number of AA Groups more closely aligned with the groups of RAF Fighter Command. The 8th AA Division merged with the 5th AA Division into the 3rd AA Group based at Bristol and cooperating with No. 10 Group RAF. Major-General Allen retired. The 5th and 8th Divisional Signals re-amalgamated at Bristol as the 3rd AA Group Signals. Postwar the unit became The 57th (City and County of Bristol) Signals Squadron, today part of 39 (Skinners) Signal Regiment.

== General Officer Commanding ==
The 8th AA Division only had one commander during its existence:

- Major-General Robert Hall Allen, MC (11 November 1940 – 30 September 1942)

== External sources ==
- British Army website
- Anti-Aircraft Command (1940) at British Military History
- Generals of World War II
- Royal Artillery 1939–1945
