= 57 (City and County of Bristol) Signal Squadron =

5th AA Divisional Signals 3 AA Group Signals 12th AA (Mixed) Signal Regiment 57 Mixed Signal Regiment 57 (City and County of Bristol) Signal Squadron
- Insignia of the Royal Corps of Signals
- Active: 1939–2016
- Country: United Kingdom
- Branch: Territorial Army
- Role: Signals
- Part of: Anti-Aircraft Command; Southern Command; 37 (Wessex and Welsh) Signal Regiment; 39 (Skinners) Signal Regiment
- Garrison/HQ: Reading, Berkshire; Bristol
- Engagements: Battle of Britain; The Blitz; Operation Diver

57 (City and County of Bristol) Signal Squadron and its predecessors were units of the Royal Corps of Signals in Britain's Territorial Army and Army Reserve from 1939 to 2016. Its history began as part of Anti-Aircraft Command in World War II during the Battle of Britain and The Blitz, and continued postwar in various headquarters (HQ) and national communication roles.

== Origin ==
Increasing concern during the 1930s about the threat of air attack led to large numbers of units of the part-time Territorial Army (TA) being converted to anti-aircraft (AA) gun and searchlight roles in the Royal Artillery (RA) and Royal Engineers (RE), and higher formations became necessary to control them. One of these formations was 5th AA Division, raised on 1 September 1938 at Reading, Berkshire, to command all the TA AA units in the South, South West and South Midlands of England and South Wales. Its signal component, 5th AA Divisional Signals, Royal Corps of Signals (RCS), was formed at Reading during 1939 under the command of Lieutenant-Colonel F.E.A. Manning, MC, AMIMechE, MIEE. He was succeeded later in the year by Major (later Lt-Col) D.V.L. Craddock.

The role of an AA divisional signal unit (Note: Divisional signal units of the Royal Signals 1920–45 were battalion-sized and commanded by a Lieutenant-Colonel or Major; they were not termed 'regiments' until 1946.) was to provide intercommunications between the divisional headquarters (HQ) and its subordinate AA brigade HQs, the AA Gun Operation Rooms (GORs, later termed AAORs) controlling the Gun Defence Areas (GDAs), and the Sector Operations Rooms (SORs) at RAF Fighter Command sector stations, which exercised tactical control over the AA guns and searchlights. Communications depended on the lines of the Defence Telecommunications Network and the General Post Office and the RCS line sections had to extend these with field lines to outlying gun positions and to repair bomb damage. Wireless sets for GORs and searchlight were not issued until 1941.

== World War II ==
=== Battle of Britain and Blitz ===
5th AA Division was fully engaged throughout the Battle of Britain, with air raids against Fighter Command airfields and port cities including Bristol, Cardiff, Portsmouth, Swansea and Southampton.

After its defeat in the Battle of Britain, the Luftwaffe switched to night bombing of cities (The Blitz). On 1 November 1940 Anti-Aircraft Command created five new divisions by to control the growing AA defences of the United Kingdom, including 8th AA Division formed by splitting 5th AA Division and duplicating its HQ functions. 5th AA Division now controlled the South Coast of England from Kent to Hampshire, including the Solent, while 8th AA Division controlled South West England. South Wales went to a new 9th AA Division. 8th AA Divisional Signals was formed at Bristol as a duplicate of 5th AA Divisional Signals. Both division's signal units became 'Mixed' in 1941, when women of the Auxiliary Territorial Service (ATS) were integrated into the units and subunits.

=== Organisation ===
The increased sophistication of Operations Rooms and communications was reflected in the growth in signal units, which attained the following organisation by JUne 1942:

5th AA Division's formation sign.

5th AA Division Mixed Signal Unit

- HQ No 1 Company
  - 5 AA Division Mixed Signal Office Section
  - 27 AA Brigade Signal Office Mixed Sub-Section
  - 108 RAF Fighter Sector Sub-Section (RAF Kenley)
  - 111 RAF Fighter Sector Sub-Section (RAF Biggin Hill)
  - 308 AA GOR Mixed Signal Section (Bramley, Hampshire)
  - 346 AA GOR Mixed Signal Section (Chichester)
  - 47 AA Brigade Signal Office Mixed Sub-Section
  - 109 RAF Fighter Sector Sub-Section (RAF Tangmere)
  - 313 AA GOR Mixed Signal Section (Newhaven, East Sussex
  - 13 AA Line Maintenance Section
- HQ No 2 Company
  - 412 AA GOR Mixed Signal Section (Netley, Hampshire, later Southampton)
    - 33 AA Sub-GOR Mixed Signal Sub-Section
  - 5 AA Brigade Signal Office Mixed Sub-Section
  - 409 AA GOR Mixed Signal Section (Fareham)
    - 28 AA Sub-GOR Mixed Signal Sub-Section
    - 29 AA Sub-GOR Mixed Signal Sub-Section
  - 35 AA Brigade Signal Office Mixed Sub-Section
  - 303 AA GOR Mixed Signal Section (Isle of Wight)
  - 72 AA Brigade Signal Office Mixed Sub-Section
  - 14 AA Line Maintenance Section
- 5 AA Division Radio Maintenance Company, Royal Army Ordnance Corps (RAOC)

8th AA Division's formation sign.

8th AA Division Mixed Signal Unit

- HQ No 1 Company
  - 8 AA Division Mixed Signal Office Section
  - 307 AA GOR Mixed Signal Section (Bristol GDA)
  - 46 AA Brigade Signal Office Mixed Sub-Section
  - 69 AA Brigade Signal Office Mixed Sub-Section
  - 110 RAF Fighter Sector Sub-Section (RAF Colerne)
  - 19 AA Line Maintenance Section
- HQ No 2 Company
  - 55 AA Brigade Signal Office Mixed Sub-Section
  - 116 RAF Fighter Sector Sub-Section (RAF Portreath)
  - 306 AA GOR Mixed Signal Section (Plymouth GDA)
  - 318 AA GOR Mixed Signal Section (Falmouth)
  - 20 AA Line Maintenance Section
- HQ No 3 Company
  - 60 AA Brigade Signal Office Mixed Sub-Section
  - 120 RAF Fighter Sector Sub-Section (RAF Exeter)
  - 64 AA Brigade Signal Office Mixed Sub-Section
  - 113 RAF Fighter Sector Sub-Section (RAF Middle Wallop)
  - 305 AA GOR Mixed Signal Section (Portland)
  - 21 AA Line Maintenance Section
- 8 AA Division Radio Maintenance Company, RAOC

The RAOC companies became part of the new Royal Electrical and Mechanical Engineers (REME) during 1942.

The Blitz ended in May 1941 but during 1942 5th and 8th AA Divisions were stretched by the Luftwaffe hit-and-run raids against coastal towns such as Torquay and Salcombe, and by the 'Baedeker Blitz' against lightly defended cities such as Exeter and Bath. New GDAs had to be established round some of these targets.

=== Reorganisation ===
A reorganisation of AA Command in October 1942 saw the AA divisions disbanded and replaced by a smaller number of AA Groups more closely aligned with the groups of RAF Fighter Command. 8th AA Division merged with 9th AA Division into 3 AA Group based at Bristol and cooperating with No. 10 Group RAF, while 5th AA Division's responsibilities along the South Coast were taken over by 2 AA Group. 3 AA Group was the largest of the new groups in terms of the numbers of GDAs to be serviced. 5th and 8th Divisional Signals re-amalgamated at Bristol as 3 AA Group Signals under the command of Lt-Col Craddock with the following organisation by January 1943:

AA Command's formation sign.

3 AA Group Mixed Signal Unit

- 1 Mixed Signal Company HQ
  - 3 AA Group Mixed Signal Office Section
  - 10 RAF Fighter Group Signal Section (RAF Box)
  - 46 AA Brigade Mixed Signal Office Section
  - 307 GOR Mixed Signal Section (Bristol GDA)
  - 69 AA Brigade Mixed Signal Section
  - 110 RAF Fighter Sector Signal Section
  - 19 AA Line Maintenance Section
- 2 Mixed Signal Company HQ
  - 55 AA Brigade Mixed Signal Office Section
  - 306 GOR Mixed Signal Section (Plymouth GDA)
  - 318 GOR Mixed Signal Section (Falmouth)
  - 116 RAF Fighter Sector Signal Sub-Section
  - 60 AA Brigade Mixed Signal Office Section
  - 120 RAF Fighter Sector Signal Sub-Section
  - 20 AA Line Maintenance Section
  - 63rd AA Brigade Mixed Signal Office Section – joined by March 1943
- 3 Mixed Signal Company HQ
  - 67 AA Brigade Mixed Signal Office Section – to 5 Company by August 1943
  - 314 GOR Mixed Signal Section (Gloucester)
  - 45 AA Brigade Mixed Signal Office Section
  - 411 GOR Mixed Signal Section (Cardiff)
    - 32 Sub-GOR Mixed Signal Sub-Section
  - 338 GOR Mixed Signal Section (Swindon)
  - 22 AA Line Maintenance Section
- 4 Mixed Signal Company HQ
  - 61 AA Brigade Mixed Signal Office Section
  - 317 GOR Mixed Signal Section (Swansea, later Neath)
  - 121 RAF Fighter Sector Signal Sub-Section
  - 319 GOR Mixed Signal Section (Milford Haven)
  - 23 AA Line Maintenance Section
- 5 Mixed Signal Company HQ
  - 64 AA Brigade Mixed Signal Office Section
  - 67 AA Brigade Mixed Signal Office Section – from 3 Company by August 1943
  - 305 GOR Mixed Signal Section (Portland)
  - 113 RAF Fighter Sector Signal Sub-Section
  - 14 AA Line Maintenance Section
- 104, 105, 106, 116 Radio Maintenance Companies, REME

By March 1944 this organisation was reduced to three signal companies (composition unknown).

=== Later war ===
In early 1944 AA Command had two major tasks. Firstly it had to provide AA defence for the mass of troops and equipment gathering in Southern England for the Allied invasion of Normandy (Operation Overlord). Secondly it had to plan for the expected arrival of V-1 flying bombs (codenamed 'Divers') in coordination with the rest of Air Defence of Great Britain in Operation Diver. 3 AA Group deployed several defence belts to protect Bristol from V-1s. The first missiles arrived on 13 June, a week after Overlord was launched on D Day. The expected V-1 bombardment of Bristol did not materialise, because US forces quickly overran the launch sites in the Cherbourg peninsula.

After the Allies broke out of the Normandy beachhead in August and overran the sites in Northern France the attacks on London also diminished. However, in September the Luftwaffe began launching V-1s from aircraft over the North Sea, approaching their targets from the east. AA Command carried out a major relocation of units to South East England, forming Diver strips and boxes to intercept the missiles as they crossed the coastline. 3 AA Group HQ moved to take over the London Inner Artillery Zone in October–November, allowing 1 AA Group to concentrate on the coast defences. The rapid deployments and redeployments of the Diver defences and the HQs meant a high degree of dependence on mobile communications, including field line construction and wireless.

However, 3 AA Group HQ was disbanded by the middle of December 1944.

== Postwar ==
When the TA was reconstituted in 1947, 3 AA Group Signals reformed at Bristol as 12th AA (Mixed) Signal Regiment, serving a new 2 AA Group covering South Wales, Bristol, the Solent, Portland and Plymouth.

AA Command was disbanded in 1955, and the AA Mixed signal regiments were converted for duty with the Home Commands, involving much re-training. 12th AA (Mixed) Signal Regiment briefly merged with 63 Mixed Signal Regiment in Southern Command at Salisbury to create Southern Command (Mixed) Signal Rgt. However, the following year the two regiments regained their independence, having exchanged some squadrons, giving 12 Command (Mixed) Signal Rgt, which was renamed 57 Signal Rgt (Mixed) in 1959.

When the TA was reduced into the Territorial and Army Volunteer Reserve (TAVR) in 1967, 57 Signal Rgt formed the basis of 37 (Wessex and Welsh) Signal Rgt at Bristol, with 43 (Wessex), 53 (Welsh) and 57 (Bristol) Signal Rgts each providing a squadron. The new regiment undertook the National Communications role within 13 Signal Group 1967–72, and with 2 Signal Group/Brigade thereafter. In 1969, 57 Sqn was joined by a Troop of the Royal Gloucestershire Hussars at Cheltenham, whose members continued to wear the RGH uniform until 1976.

In November 1992, 57 Signal Sqn left 37 Signal Rgt (whose HQ relocated to Redditch) and joined 71 (Yeomanry) Signal Regiment, then in April 1995 transferred again (as 57 (City and County of Bristol) Signal Squadron) to 39 (Skinners) Signal Regiment, which relocated its regimental HQ to Bristol.

In April 2016, under the 2020 Reserve Structure plan, the squadron was split up, the Bristol detachment merging with 43 (Wessex) Sqn to form 43 (Wessex and City & County of Bristol) Signal Squadron based at Bath, and the Gloucester detachment being absorbed into 53 (Wales and Western) Signal Sqn, based at Cardiff, both remaining in 39 (Skinners) Signal Rgt.

== External sources ==
- British Army website
- British Military History
- Graham Watson, The Territorial Army 1947
