= 393rd Division =

393rd Division may refer to:

- 393rd Infantry Division, Wehrmacht, Germany
- 393rd Rifle Division, Soviet Union

== See also ==
- List of military divisions by number
- 393rd (disambiguation)
