= 88th Searchlight Regiment, Royal Artillery =

88th Searchlight Regiment, RA
- Royal Artillery cap badge
- Active: 4 March 1941 – 2 October 1943
- Country: United Kingdom
- Branch: British Army
- Type: Searchlight
- Role: Air Defence
- Size: 4 Batteries
- Part of: 60th AA Brigade
- Engagements: Baedeker Blitz

The 88th Searchlight Regiment (88th S/L Rgt) was an air defence unit of Britain's Royal Artillery during World War II. The regiment was formed in March 1941 as part of the rapid expansion of Anti-Aircraft (AA) defences during The Blitz. It served in AA Command until disbandment in 1943.

== Origin ==
90 cm 'Projector Anti-Aircraft', displayed at Fort Nelson, Hampshire.

88th Searchlight Regiment (88th S/L Rgt) was created during the rapid expansion of AA defences during The Blitz. Regimental Headquarters (RHQ) was formed at New Court, Topsham, near Exeter, on 4 March 1941 and it was allocated four S/L batteries numbered 538, 539, 540 and 544. The batteries came from different training regiments, where each had been formed on 14 November around a cadre of experienced men drawn from existing S/L units:

Formation sign of 8th AA Division.

- 538 S/L Bty formed by 232nd S/L Training Rgt at Devizes, cadre from 482 (Cornwall) and 483 (Dorset Fortress Engineers) S/L Btys
- 539 S/L Bty formed by 233rd S/L Training Rgt at Saighton Camp, cadre from 58th (Middlesex) S/L Rgt
- 540 S/L Bty formed by 234th S/L Training Rgt at Carlisle, cadre from 46th (Lincolnshire Regiment) S/L Rgt
- 544 S/L Bty formed by 238th S/L Training Rgt at Buxton, cadre from 57th (8th Cameronians) S/L Rgt

After training, the regiment was assigned to 60th AA Brigade in 8th AA Division in South West England. The brigade was responsible for Exeter, Yeovil, and Portland Harbour.

The role of the S/L units was to track and illuminate raiders for the Heavy AA (HAA) guns of the Gun Defence Areas (GDAs) and for the few available Royal Air Force (RAF) Night fighters. In November 1940 AA Command had adopted a system of clustering three S/Ls together to improve illumination, but this meant that the clusters had to be spaced 10,400 yards (9,500 m) apart. This layout was an attempt to improve the chances of picking up enemy bombers and keeping them illuminated for engagement by AA guns or night fighters. Eventually, one light in each cluster was to be equipped with Searchlight Control radar (SLC) and act as 'master light', but the radar equipment was still in short supply.

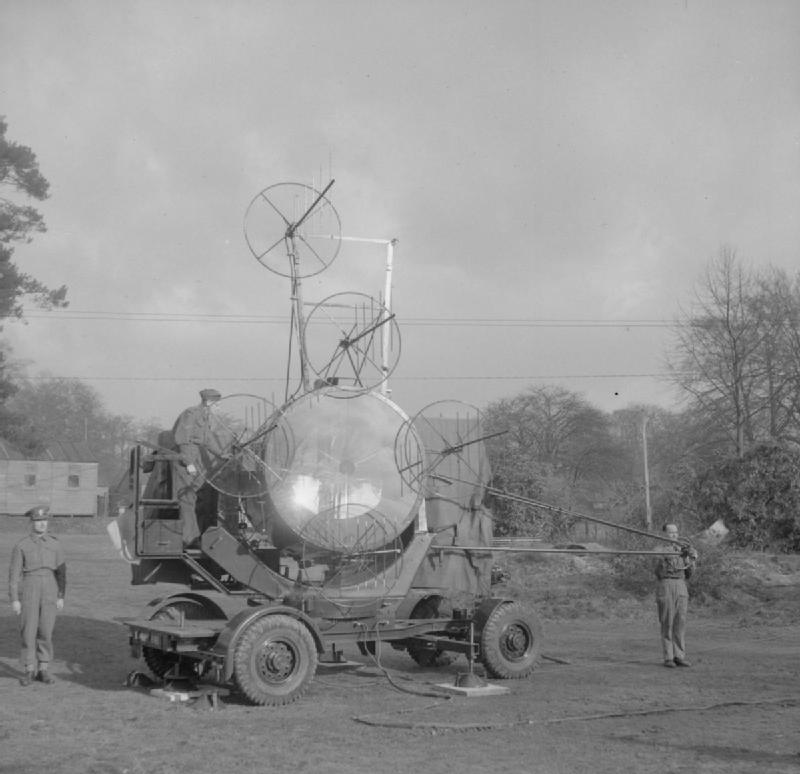
150 cm S/L with AA Radar No 2.

By October 1941 the availability of SLC was sufficient to allow AA Command's S/L sites to be 'declustered' into single-light sites spaced at 6,000 yards (5,500 m) intervals in 'Indicator Belts' in the approaches to the GDAs, and 'Killer Belts' at 6,000 yards (5,500 m) spacing to cooperate with the RAF's night fighters.

== Baedeker Blitz ==
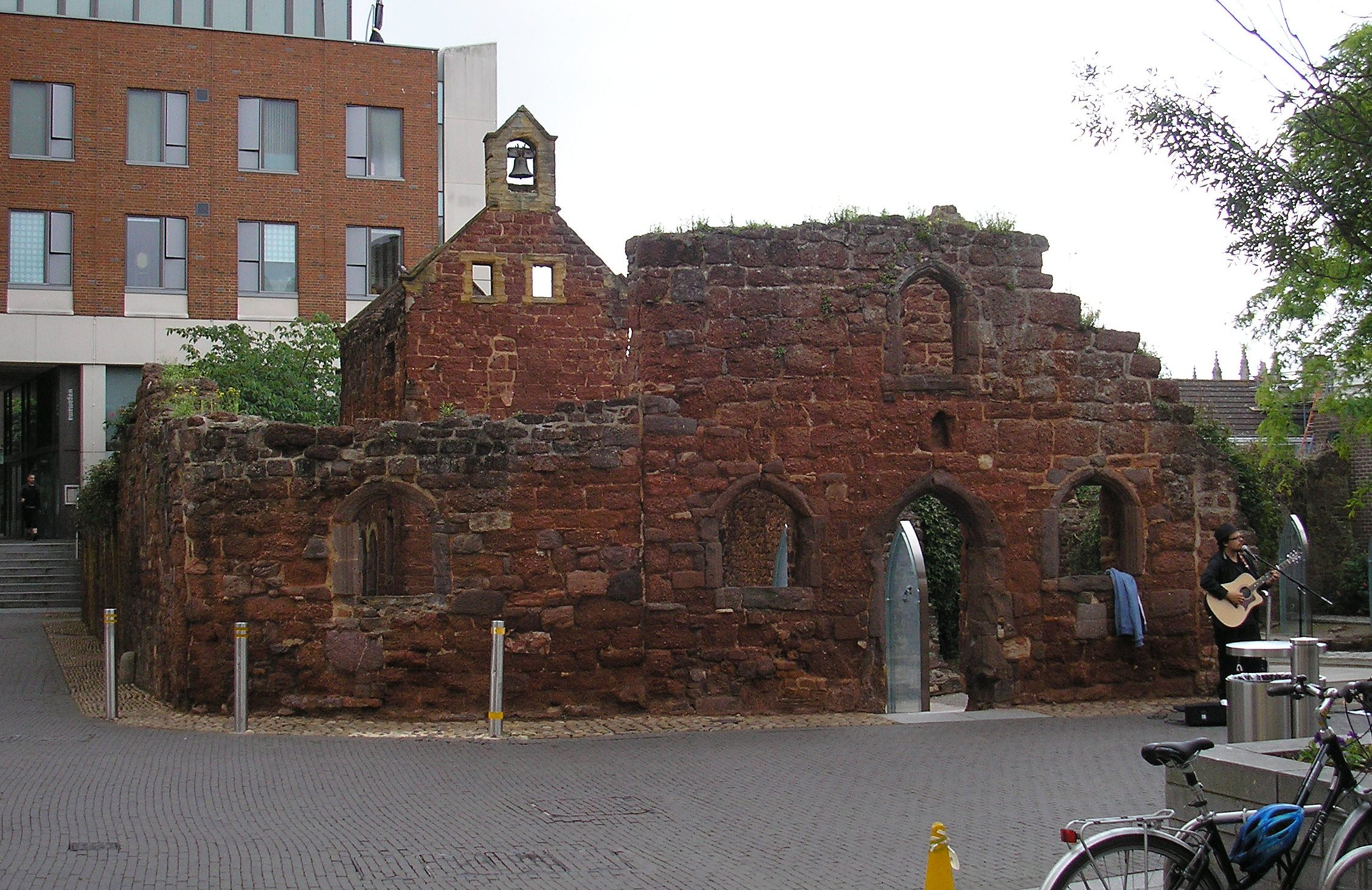
The ruins of St Catharine's Almshouses, preserved as a memorial to the Exeter Blitz.

The area between Portland and Exeter had been left largely unscathed during the Blitz of 1940–41, but at New Year 1942 the Luftwaffe began launching Fighter-bomber attacks on towns along the South Coast of England. Then the night bomber force returned, making small raids on Portland, on 23 March, and on nearby Weymouth, on 2 April. Then on the nights of 23/24 and 24/25 April, Exeter was bombed (the Exeter Blitz). This was the start of a major campaign against undefended towns and cities across England, chosen as much for cultural reasons as for their industries, and became known as the Baedeker Blitz. Across South West England, Bath was hit on 25/26 and 26/27 April, Exeter again on 3/4 May, Poole on 24/25 May and 3/4 June, and Weston-super-Mare on 27/28 and 28/29 June. In addition, better-defended major targets in neighbouring areas were also revisited, including Southampton, Portsmouth and Plymouth. AA Command's response was to move HAA guns from what had been higher-priority targets, creating a number of new GDAs, and completing the reorganisation of the S/L belts.

88th Searchlight Rgt remained with 60th AA Bde throughout this period. A reorganisation of AA Command in October 1942 saw the AA divisions disbanded and replaced by a smaller number of AA Groups more closely aligned with the groups of RAF Fighter Command. 8th AA Division merged with 9th AA Division in South Wales to form 3 AA Group based at Bristol and cooperating with No. 10 Group RAF.

Although the daylight 'hit and run' attacks against the coast continued into 1943, there were fewer night raids after the middle of 1942, although Plymouth continued to be attacked on occasions. 88th Searchlight Rgt continued in 60th AA Bde during this period.

== Disbandment ==
With the lower threat of attack by the weakened Luftwaffe, AA Command was forced to release manpower for the planned invasion of Normandy (Operation Overlord). All Home Defence S/L regiments were reduced, and some like 88th were run down altogether. On 2 October 1943, RHQ and 538–40 S/L Btys were disbanded. 544 Searchlight Bty was to have become independent, but this too was disbanded by 15 October.
