= Robert Allen (British Army officer) =

British Army officer and footballer (1886–1981)

Major-General Robert Allen CB MC
- Born: 11 June 1886; Kolkata, British India
- Died: 20 September 1981 (aged 95); Chippenham, England
- Military career
- Allegiance: United Kingdom
- Branch: British Army
- Service years: 1905–1942
- Rank: Major-General
- Commands: 8th Anti-Aircraft Division (1940–42); 5th Anti-Aircraft Division (1940); 48th Anti-Aircraft Brigade (1938–40)
- Conflicts: First World War; Second World War
- Awards: Companion of the Order of the Bath; Military Cross; Mentioned in Despatches (2)
Association football career
- Position: Forward
Senior career*
Years	Team	Apps	(Gls)
- Old Carthusians
- Corinthian
1914–1919	West Ham United	1	(1)
- Old Carthusians
- * Club domestic league appearances and goals

Major-General Robert Hall Allen, CB, MC (11 June 1886 – 20 September 1981) was a British Army officer and an English footballer who played as a forward.

== Football career ==
In 1914, Allen signed for West Ham United from amateur club Corinthian, after impressing against West Ham at Upton Park on 27 April 1914 in a charity match for West Ham Hospital. The Westminster Gazette described Allen's performance as "heavy and fast", exerting "wonderful control over the light, dry ball, dribbling in a style reminiscent of the old-time Corinthians" whilst "giving perfect passes". Despite being signed in time for the 1914–15 season, Allen didn't play for the club due to his military commitments in the First World War.

Following the culmination of the war, Allen returned to West Ham. On 1 November 1919, Allen made his debut for the club in a 2–1 home loss against Birmingham. Despite scoring West Ham's only goal after six minutes, Allen would not play for the club again, returning to play for Old Carthusians, with whom he began his career with.

== Military career ==
During the First World War, and after being educated at Charterhouse School followed by receiving a commission as an officer in the Royal Artillery after graduating from the Royal Military Academy, Woolwich in 1905, he served with the Royal Artillery in Gallipoli, where he was twice mentioned in despatches and awarded the Military Cross (MC), and later in Egypt. In 1916 he married the daughter of a general.

Allen then attended the Staff College, Camberley, in 1920 and was made Assistant Adjutant and Quartermaster General at Aldershot Command from 1937 to 1938 and then specialised in anti-aircraft defence. After being promoted to major-general in 1939, the year the Second World War broke out, he took command of the 5th Anti-Aircraft Division, which he led until 1941 when he took command of the 8th Anti-Aircraft Division. He was appointed a Companion of the Order of the Bath in 1942, the same he retired from the army.

He spent his final years in Wiltshire, and listed his recreation as solving simple chess problems.

== Bibliography ==
- Smart, Nick (2005). Biographical Dictionary of British Generals of the Second World War. Barnsley, South Yorkshire: Pen and Sword Books. ISBN 1844150496.
