= 104th Heavy Anti-Aircraft Regiment, Royal Artillery =

Artillery unit of the British Army

104th Heavy Anti-Aircraft Regiment, RA
- Cap Badge of the Royal Artillery
- Active: 15 August 1940–8 September 1944
- Country: United Kingdom
- Branch: British Army
- Type: Heavy Anti-Aircraft
- Role: Air Defence
- Size: 3–4 Batteries
- Part of: Anti-Aircraft Command; Eighth Army
- Engagements: The Blitz; Sicily; Italy

104th Heavy Anti-Aircraft Regiment, Royal Artillery (104th HAA Rgt) was an air defence unit of the British Army during World War II. It served in Anti-Aircraft Command in the UK and later went to the Mediterranean theatre where it served in the campaigns in Sicily and Italy.

== Origin ==
As part of the rapid build-up of Britain's air defences under Anti-Aircraft Command in the early years of World War II the Royal Artillery (RA) a large number of new heavy antiaircraft (HAA) units. Regimental Headquarters (RHQ) of 104th HAA Rgt was formed on 15 August 1940. 328, 329 and 336 HAA Batteries were regimented with it on 26 September; the first two had been formed on 27 April and the third on 1 August. In mid-August sections of 329 HAA Bty had been attached for training to the Regular 15 HAA Bty of 6th HAA Rgt, which was manning modern 3.7-inch guns on sites at Whitchurch, Bristol, and 'Reservoir'. (Note: Possibly at the nearby Barrow Gurney Reservoirs.) These sites in the West Country were in frequent action during the Battle of Britain, which was then raging over southern England. Most of the raids penetrating as far as Bristol were night raids, notably one on 4/5 September. Thereafter most attacks were directed against London as the Luftwaffe changed its tactics.

== Service ==
=== Home defence ===
As AA Command continued to expand, a new 8th AA Division took over command of the units in the West Country from November 1940. Now the Luftwaffe stepped up night attacks against British cities, with Bristol receiving frequent raids, particularly heavy in March 1941 (the Bristol Blitz).

At the beginning of 1941 104th HAA Rgt sent a cadre of experienced officers and men to 207th HAA Training Regiment at Devizes to provide the basis for a new 411 HAA Bty; this was formed on 16 January and joined the regiment on 10 April.

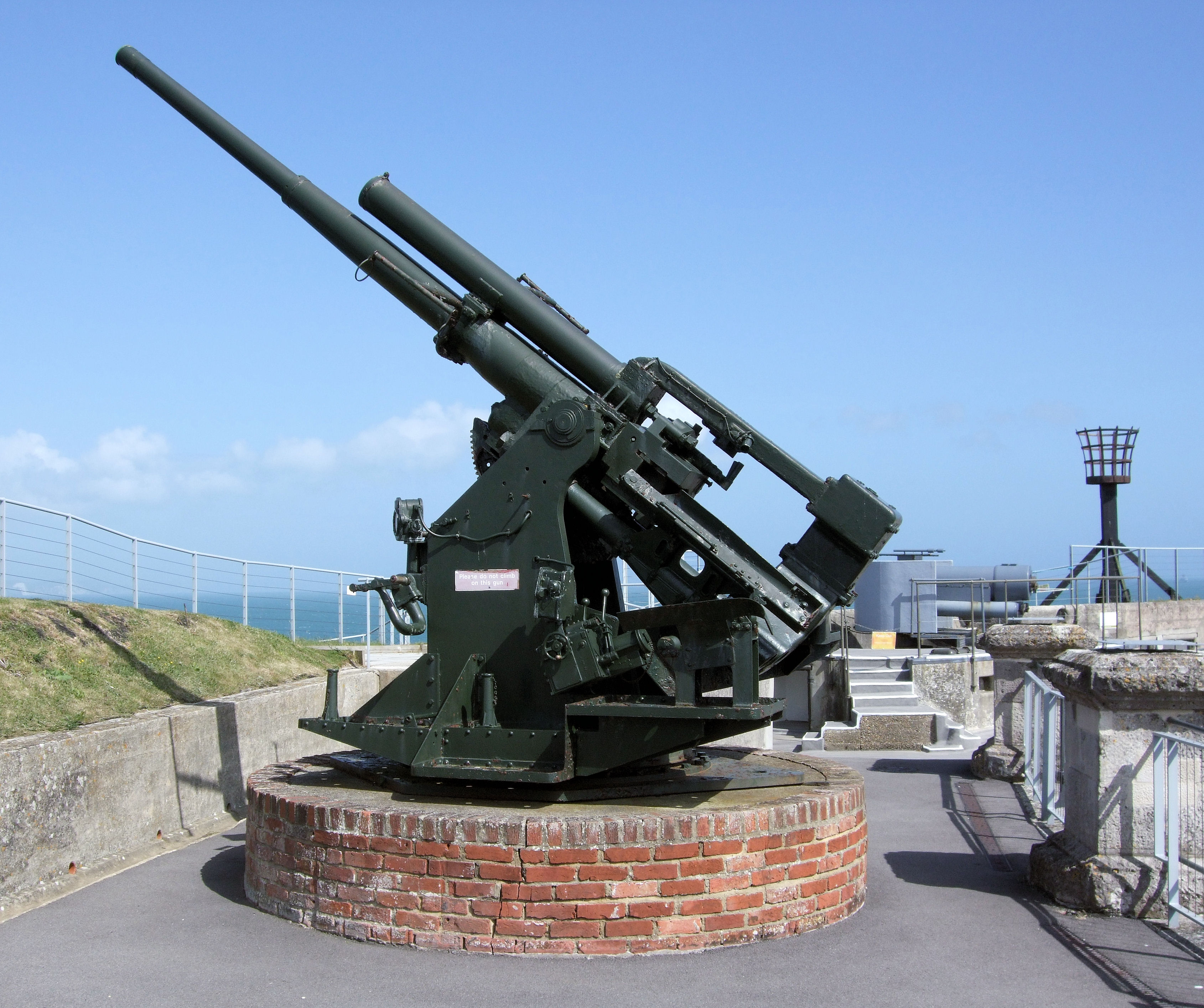
Static 3.7-inch HAA gun preserved at Nothe Fort overlooking Portland Harbour.

In February 1941 104th HAA Rgt became the HAA component of a new 60 AA Bde formed at Yeovil in 8th AA Division. The brigade was to cover Yeovil, Exeter and Portland Harbour. However, 411 HAA Bty was attached to 46 AA Bde (covering Bristol) until July.

The regiment sent another cadre to 207th HAA Training Rgt at Devizes, as the basis for 452nd HAA Bty formed on 10 July 1941 to replace 411 HAA Bty. 452 Bty arrived from training on 30 September when 411 Bty joined 127th HAA Rgt. By the end of November 1941 8th AA Division had been reorganised: 60th AA Bde became a searchlight formation, and 104th HAA Rgt had transferred to 46 AA Bde. However, in December the regiment moved to 35 AA Bde in 5th AA Division, covering central southern England, including Portsmouth.

The regiment left for 6th AA Division in South-East England in April 1942, joining 37 AA Bde north of the Thames Estuary. It was without 452 HAA Bty, which was detached to a new 71 AA Bde and then joined the newly-formed 164th HAA Rgt in July.

During October 104th HAA Rgt left 37th AA Bde and was listed as 'unbrigaded' until 21 December when it joined the recently formed 76 AA Bde at Blandford Camp. 76 AA Brigade did not form part of Anti-Aircraft Command but came directly under General Headquarters, Home Forces. Its units were under training for service overseas, attending various practice camps and exercises. 336 HAA Bty was sent on 22 January to be depot battery at Larkhill Camp, and then on 16 February 329 HAA Bty went to practice at Poole. On 22 February 76 AA Bde HQ and its units including 104th HAA Rgt were sent a warning order to prepare to mobilise under War Office (WO) Control, the precursor to being sent overseas. Meanwhile, the training continued during March and April: 104th HAA Rgt sending a demonstration detachment to Larkhill and 336 HAA Bty going to the practice camp at Aberporth. 329 HAA Bty returned from Larkhill and also went to Aberporth.

As other units arrived to train with 76 AA Bde, 104th HAA Rgt mobilised under WO control with the following organisation:

- RHQ 104th HAA Rgt
- 328, 329, 336 HAA Btys
- 104 HAA Signal Detachment, Royal Corps of Signals
- 104 HAA Workshop, Royal Army Ordnance Corps
- 1577 HAA Rgt Platoon, Royal Army Service Corps

At this time the regiment was under the command of 1st Canadian Division. This formation, followed by 104th HAA Rgt (under command of 73 AA Bde), sailed from the Clyde to the Mediterranean at the beginning of July 1943 to taking part in the Allied invasion of Sicily (Operation Husky).

=== Sicily and Italy ===
Operation Husky began in July 1943, and 73 AA Bde began landing AA regiments and individual batteries in August. However, errors in embarkation and convoy arrangements meant that some arrived without their vehicles, including one battery of 104th HAA Rgt. By the end of August 73 AA Bde had six regiments in action including 104th HAA, but it only had transport for one and a half. Batteries in the rear were stripped of their transport to supply the mobile units moving up, leaving those left behind barely able to draw ammunition and rations. The Germans carried out a fighting withdrawal to Messina and then evacuated the island. Eighth Army then regrouped for Operation Baytown, to land on the Italian mainland. By now 104th HAA Rgt, still awaiting the arrival of one of its batteries, was stationed defending airfields around Lentini. It remained on Sicily during the autumn, with all three batteries on airfield defence under 73 AA Bde.

In December 1943 104th HAA Rgt moved to mainland Italy under 25 AA Bde. This brigade took over the defences of Bari which had been greatly strengthened after a disastrous Air raid on Bari on 2 December. Under 25 AA Bde the port was defended by all three batteries of 104th HAA Rgt and two more from 64th (Northumbrian) HAA Rgt (a total of 40 x 3.7-inch guns), together with 72nd LAA Rgt (54 x Bofors guns) and 184 'Z Battery' (12 x 9-barrel rocket launchers), as well as US and Italian searchlights. Bari continued to be raided by the Luftwaffe, mainly at night, dropping 'Window' to confuse the Allied radar. The HAA batteries' GL Mk II gunlaying radar was least affected, and their sets were used to direct searchlights as well as HAA guns. 25 AA Brigade also set up a decoy site outside Bari and stationed some of its guns there to attract bombers away from the vital port.

By late 1944, the Luftwaffe was suffering from such shortages of pilots, aircraft and fuel that serious air attacks were rare. At the same time the British Army was suffering a severe manpower shortage. The result was that a number of AA units were deemed surplus and were disbanded to provide reinforcements to other arms of service.104th HAA Regiment, with 328 and 329 Btys, was disbanded on 8 September 1944; 336 Bty was disbanded on 18 December that year.

Postwar, a new 104 (Mixed) HAA Regiment was formed from the wartime 144th (Mixed) HAA Rgt. This had no connection with the original 104th.
