= 132nd Light Anti-Aircraft Regiment, Royal Artillery =

85th Searchlight Regiment, RA 132nd Light Anti-Aircraft Regiment, RA
- Royal Artillery cap badge
- Active: 23 January 1941–March 1945
- Country: United Kingdom
- Branch: British Army
- Type: Searchlight Regiment; Light Anti-Aircraft Regiment
- Role: Air Defence
- Size: 3–4 Batteries
- Part of: Anti-Aircraft Command

The 132nd Light Anti-Aircraft Regiment (132nd LAA Rgt), was an air defence unit of the British Army's Royal Artillery during World War II. The regiment was formed in March 1942 from the short-lived 85th Searchlight Regiment, Royal Artillery (85th S/L Rgt) which had only been raised in the previous year as part of the rapid expansion of Anti-Aircraft Command. It served in Home Defence throughout the war, until disbandment in 1945.

== 85th Searchlight Regiment ==
The regiment was formed during the rapid expansion of anti-aircraft (AA) defences during the Blitz of 1940–41. Regimental Headquarters (RHQ) was formed on 23 January 1941 at 35th Light Anti-Aircraft (LAA) Regiment's RHQ at Black Hall on St Giles', Oxford. (This regiment was later lost at the Fall of Singapore.) The four searchlight (S/L) batteries assigned to it had been formed on 14 November 1940 at Blandford Camp, as follows:

- 520 S/L Bty by 230 S/L Training Rgt, based on a cadre of experienced officers and other ranks supplied by 33rd (St Pancras) S/L Rgt
- 521 S/L Bty by 230 S/L Training Rgt, cadre supplied by 35th (First Surrey Rifles) S/L Rgt
- 522 S/L Bty by 231 S/L Training Rgt, cadre supplied by 48th (Hampshire) S/L Rgt
- 523 S/L Bty by 231 S/L Training Rgt, cadre supplied by 60th (Middlesex) S/L Rgt

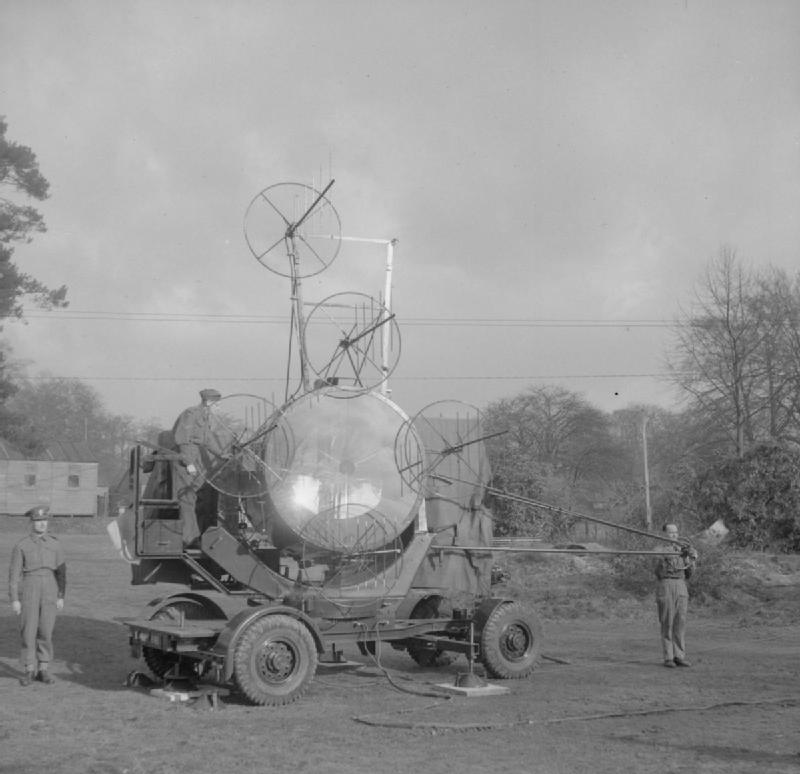
150 cm S/L with AA Radar No 2

The regiment was assigned to 64th AA Brigade covering airfields in South West England under 8th AA Division. By the time it came into existence the Blitz was ending. During this campaign AA Command had adopted a S/L layout of clusters of three lights to improve illumination, but this meant that the clusters had to be spaced 10,400 yards (9,500 m) apart. The cluster system was an attempt to improve the chances of picking up enemy bombers and keeping them illuminated for engagement by AA guns or night fighters. Eventually, one light in each cluster was to be equipped with Searchlight Control radar (SLC or 'Elsie') and act as 'master light', but the radar equipment was still in short supply. 64th AA Brigade's batteries were deployed in three-light clusters at Royal Air Force (RAF) airfields, and had begun to receive GL Mark I E/F gun-laying radar equipped with elevation-finding equipment. By the autumn of 1941 the brigade began to receive its first purpose-built SLC radar (AA Radar No 2) in sufficient numbers to allow the sites to be 'declustered' into single-light sites spaced at 6,000 yards (5,500 m) intervals in a 'Killer Belt' cooperating with RAF night fighters.

85th S/L Regiment left 64th AA Bde in the autumn of 1941 and joined 55th AA Bde, covering Plymouth and Falmouth, still in 8th AA Division. However, 520 and 523 S/L Btys remained attached to 64th AA Bde.

== 132nd Light Anti-Aircraft Regiment ==
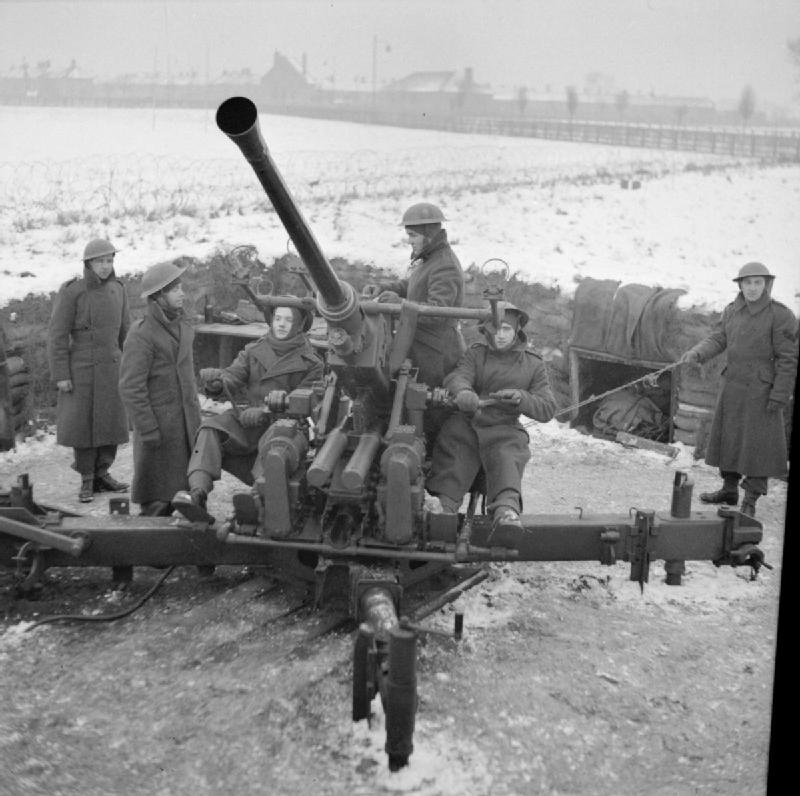
A Bofors crew undergoing training in early 1942.

After its rapid expansion, AA Command was now over-provided with S/L units and under-provided with LAA units, for which suitable guns (the Bofors 40 mm) were becoming available in quantity. The command began a programme of converting some S/L regiments to the LAA role. One of those chosen was 85th S/L Rgt, which became 132nd Light Anti-Aircraft Regiment on 19 March 1942, with 436, 437, 438, 441 LAA Btys. At first the new regiment was assigned to 27th (Home Counties) AA Bde in 5th AA Division covering the Solent and South Coast. In June it transferred to a newly formed 71st AA Bde in 6th AA Division covering South East England, with 458 and 441 LAA Btys detached to 28th (Thames and Medway) AA Bde. In July the whole regiment came under 28th AA Bde in 6th AA Division. This brigade was responsible for the AA defences on the south side of the Thames Estuary ('Thames South') including the Royal Naval Dockyard at Chatham.

=== Mid-war ===
The AA defences of Southern England were severely tested in the summer of 1942 by the Luftwaffe's 'hit-and-run' attacks against coastal towns, and there was much redeployment of LAA units to deal with these raids.

A reorganisation of AA Command in October 1942 saw the AA divisions disbanded and replaced by a smaller number of AA Groups more closely aligned with the organisation of RAF Fighter Command. 28th AA Brigade came under a new 1 AA Group covering London and the Thames Estuary. From December 1942 until April 1943, 436 LAA Bty was attached to 38th AA Bde in 2 AA Group responsible for South East England outside London. 28th AA Bde had a constant turnover of units during 1943, but 132nd LAA Rgt remained with into 1944.

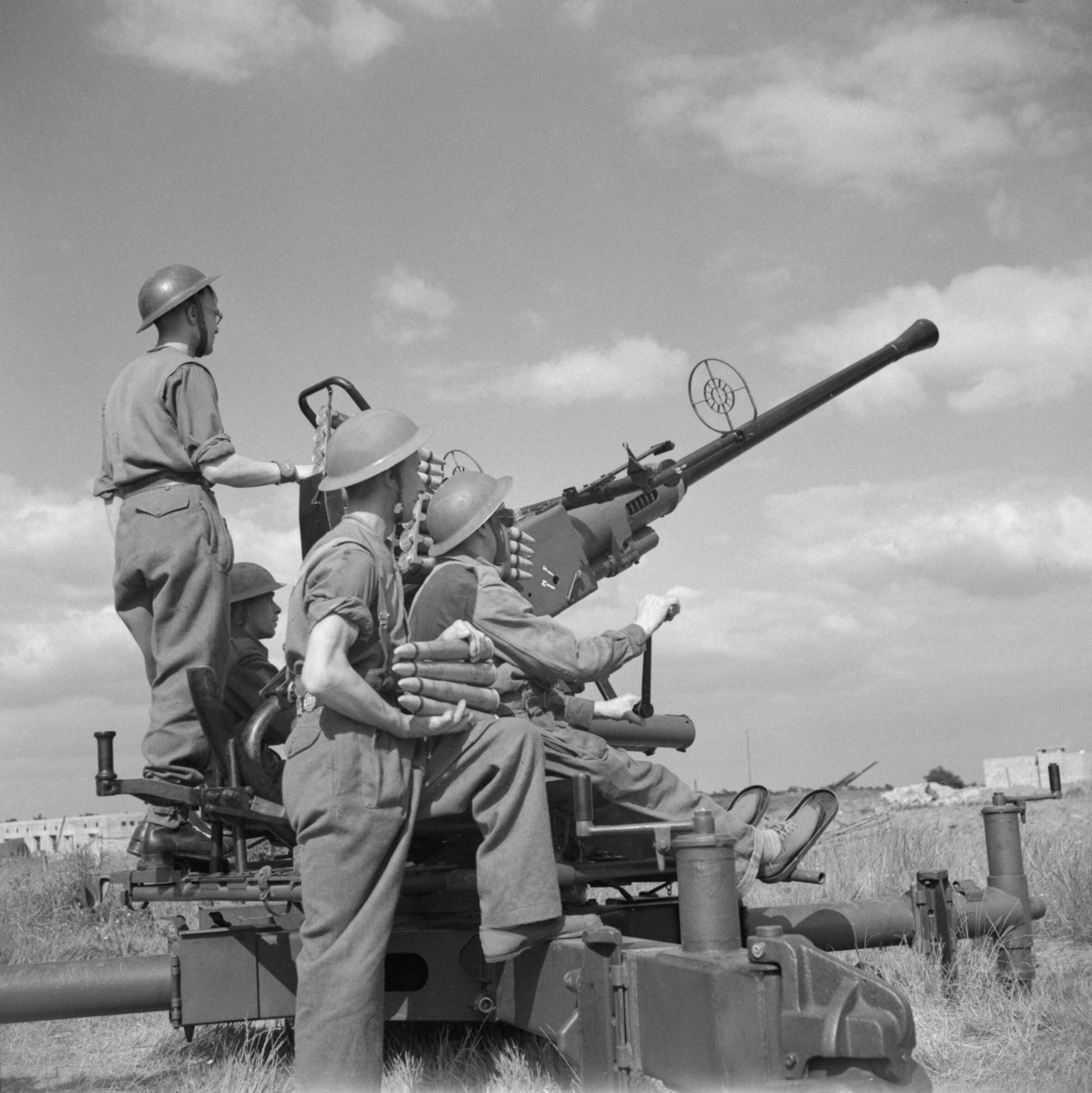
Bofors gun and crew, summer 1944.

With the lower threat of attack by the weakened Luftwaffe, AA Command was now being forced to release manpower for the planned invasion of Normandy (Operation Overlord). Many Home Defence AA regiments were reduced from February 1944, and 132nd LAA Rgt lost 441 LAA Bty, which began disbanding at Cobham, Kent, on 22 February 1944, completing by 16 March.

=== Operation Diver ===
AA Command had been given the responsibility for protecting the 'Overlord' embarkation ports, while at the same time intelligence indicated that the Germans could start launching V-1 flying bombs ('Divers') against London at any time. AA Command began preparing the AA defences of Southern England for Operation Diver.

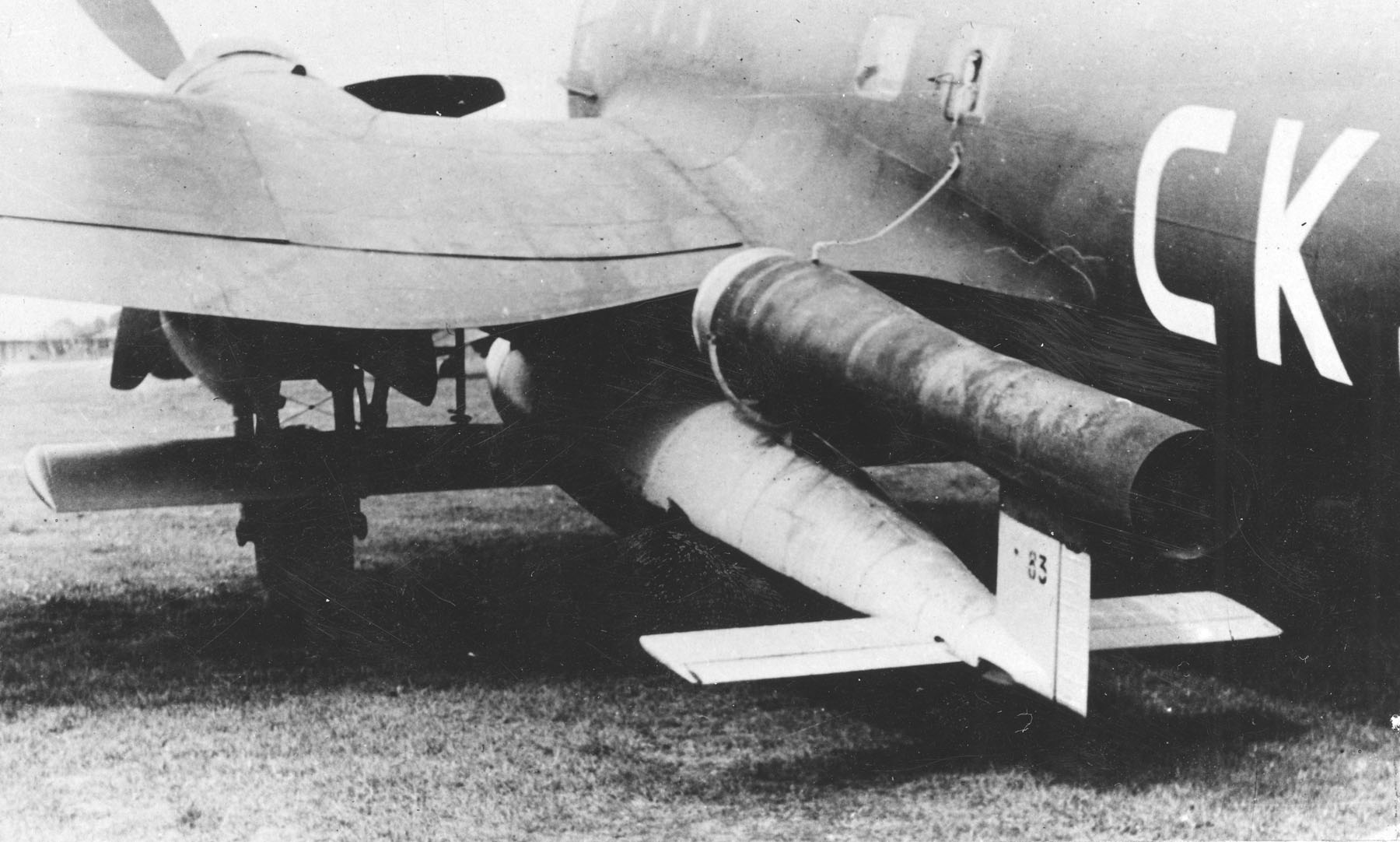
V-1 slung under the wing of a Heinkel He 111 bomber.

The beginning of the V-1 campaign against London came on 13 June, a week after Overlord was launched on D Day, and Operation Diver was put into immediate effect. The V-1 presented AA Command's biggest challenge since the Blitz: the small fast-moving targets often cruising above the effective range of LAA guns presented a severe problem for AA defences, and after two weeks' experience AA Command carried out a major reorganisation, stripping guns from other areas and repositioning them along the South Coast to target V-1s coming in over the English Channel. As the launching sites were overrun by 21st Army Group, the Luftwaffe switched to air-launching V-1s over the North Sea, resulting in another redeployment for 1 AA Group, this time to the east of London. During this phase of Operation Diver there were over 850 light and heavy AA guns to the east of London in the 'Diver Box', including 28th AA Bde. The Germans responded by launching V-1s from further north, in order to bypass the Diver defences. AA Command hurriedly set up a 'Diver Strip' in East Anglia. and formed a new 9 AA Group to take this over. 28th AA Bde moved to this new formation in December 1944, giving up its previous units and taking over fresh ones.

=== Disbandment ===
However, 132nd LAA Rgt remained in North Kent. As the war in Europe came to an end in early 1945, AA Command was rapidly run down. Regimental HQ 132nd LAA Rgt with 436, 437 and 438 LAA Btys disbanded at Hartlip, Sittingbourne, at some time between 13 March and 11 May 1945.
