= 68th (Monmouthshire Regiment) Searchlight Regiment, Royal Artillery =

68th (Monmouthshire Regiment) Searchlight Regiment, RA 603rd (Monmouthshire Regiment) Heavy Anti-Aircraft Regiment, RA
- Active: 1 November 1938 – 10 March 1955
- Country: United Kingdom
- Branch: Territorial Army
- Type: Searchlight regiment Garrison battalion Heavy anti-aircraft regiment
- Role: Air defence
- Size: Regiment
- Part of: Anti-Aircraft Command
- Garrison/HQ: Newport, Wales
- Engagements: Battle of Britain; The Blitz; North West Europe

68th (Monmouthshire Regiment) Searchlight Regiment was a part-time air defence unit of Britain's Territorial Army converted from an infantry battalion just before World War II. It served in Anti-Aircraft Command defending the West of England until almost the end of the war, when it was converted back into an infantry battalion for occupation duties in North West Europe. Postwar it served on in the air defence role until the disbandment of AA Command in 1955.

== Origin ==
In the 1930s the increasing need for anti-aircraft (AA) defence for Britain's cities was addressed by converting a number of Territorial Army (TA) infantry battalions into searchlight (S/L) units. The 1st Battalion, Monmouthshire Regiment, was one unit selected for this role, becoming 1st (Rifle) Battalion, The Monmouthshire Regiment (68th Searchlight Regiment) on 1 November 1938. The battalion, which dated back to 1860 and had served with distinction as pioneers during World War I, was based at Stow Hill, Newport, Wales, and reorganised for its new role with Headquarters (HQ), 453, 454 and 455 S/L Companies.

It formed part of 45th Anti-Aircraft Brigade, which was responsible for the AA defences of South Wales. Initially the brigade was under 4th Anti-Aircraft Division; it was due to transfer to 5th AA Division, but this was still in the process of formation when war broke out on 3 September 1939.

== World War II ==
=== Mobilisation and Phoney War ===
90 cm 'Projector Anti-Aircraft', displayed at Fort Nelson, Hampshire.

At the time the regiment was formed, the TA's AA units were in a state of mobilisation because of the Munich crisis, although they were soon stood down. In February 1939 the existing AA defences came under the control of a new Anti-Aircraft Command. In June a partial mobilisation of TA units was begun in a process known as 'couverture', whereby each AA unit did a month's tour of duty in rotation to man selected AA and searchlight positions. On 24 August, ahead of the declaration of war, AA Command was fully mobilised at its war stations.

Some redeployment took place during the Phoney War period. On 30 September the regiment was ordered to begin transferring from 45th to 46th AA Brigade, which was responsible for the 'Bristol Defended Area', including Avonmouth Docks and various aircraft factories. In the near-total absence of light AA (LAA) guns, detachments from other units were deployed with Lewis guns (LGs) during October and November to cover various airfields and aircraft factories designated as Vulnerable Points (VPs). Searchlight detachments were routinely equipped with LGs for local defence, and so in November 68th S/L Rgt took over 16 LGs at Parnall Aircraft, Yate, previously manned by a heavy AA unit. On 8 December 454 S/L Co arrived in 46th Bde's area with Company HQ at Tetbury, followed by the other two companies, but as there was no equipment available for them to operate they continued their training with a few S/L sets. 454 Company was temporarily detached to 35th AA Bde in the Portsmouth area until May 1940.

In early 1940 most of the S/L units handed over their LAA responsibilities at VPs to specialist LAA units, but when 453 S/L Company left Yate in April it moved to the Rotol Airscrews factory at Cheltenham to relieve an LAA unit that was going to training camp. Similarly, in mid-March, a newly formed 474 S/L Battery moved into the Tetbury area and took over the S/L sites and equipment from 455 S/L Company, which went to training camp. This independent battery came under the orders of 68th S/L Rgt, but within a month it had moved on into Hampshire.

=== Battle of Britain ===
As the Phoney War ended with the German invasion of the Low Countries in May, followed by the British Expeditionary Force's evacuation from Dunkirk, AA Command went on invasion alert and 454 and 455 S/L Companies returned to the regiment from Portsmouth. All S/L detachments were warned to be ready to counter-attack any German paratroops landing in their area. 68th Searchlight Rgt sent a detachment to take up ground defence duties at RAF Tangmere, and 455 Company moved to Weyhill, Hampshire, in July. Most of the combats during the early part of the Battle of Britain were in daylight, but Luftwaffe night bombers regularly appeared over the Bristol Defended Area and the S/Ls in South West England were frequently in action.

In July 5th AA Bde was reformed in the Gloucester area in 5th AA Division after its evacuation from Dunkirk, and 68th S/L Rgt was among the units assigned to it.

On 1 August 1940 all the infantry battalions that had converted to AA roles became regiments of the Royal Artillery (RA) and from that date ceased to be part of the corps of their parent regiments. Their companies were henceforward termed batteries. Although the personnel retained their 1st Monmouths cap badges, worn with RA collar badges, 68th Searchlight Regiment, RA, did not regain its 'Monmouthshire Regiment' subtitle until 18 February 1942. The regiment supplied a cadre of experienced officers and men to 232nd S/L Training Rgt at Devizes where it provided the basis for a new 525 S/L Bty formed on 14 November 1940. This battery later joined 82nd S/L Rgt.

=== Blitz ===
In November 1940 AA Command changed its S/L layouts to clusters of three lights to improve illumination, but this meant that the clusters had to be spaced 10,400 yards (9,500 m) apart. The cluster system was an attempt to improve the chances of picking up enemy bombers and keeping them illuminated for engagement by AA guns or Royal Air Force (RAF) Night fighters. Eventually, one light in each cluster was to be equipped with Searchlight Control radar (SLC) and act as 'master light', but the radar equipment was still in short supply.

In November 1940, as the Luftwaffe 's night bombing campaign against British cities (The Blitz) was getting under way, there was a major reorganisation of AA Command. 5 AA Division's responsibilities were split, with 9 AA Division created to cover the South Midlands and South Wales. 5 AA Brigade came under this new formation, with responsibility for covering Gloucester and Hereford.

There were few air raids in 5 AA Bde's area, although the defence of the aircraft factories still caused concern after the Gloster Aircraft Company works at Hucclecote were targeted in February. In March 1941 68th Searchlight Rgt was ordered to strip some Lewis guns from its S/L clusters and send them back to Parnall's at Yate.

=== Mid-war ===
8th AA Division's formation sign.

By May 1941, 68th S/L Rgt had reverted to the command of 46 AA Bde in the Bristol area, now under 8th AA Division. When 46 AA Bde was split to form 69 AA Bde in July 1941, 68th S/L Rgt came under the new formation, which took command of the S/L regiments. 68th Searchlight Rgt remained with 69 AA Bde for the next two years. b

In September 1941 AA Command began to receive its first purpose-built SLC radar in sufficient numbers to allow the sites to be 'declustered' into single-light sites spaced at 6,000 yards (5,500 m) intervals in 'Indicator Belts', 'Killer Belts' cooperating with night-fighters, and with the HAA guns of the Gun Defence Areas such as Bristol.

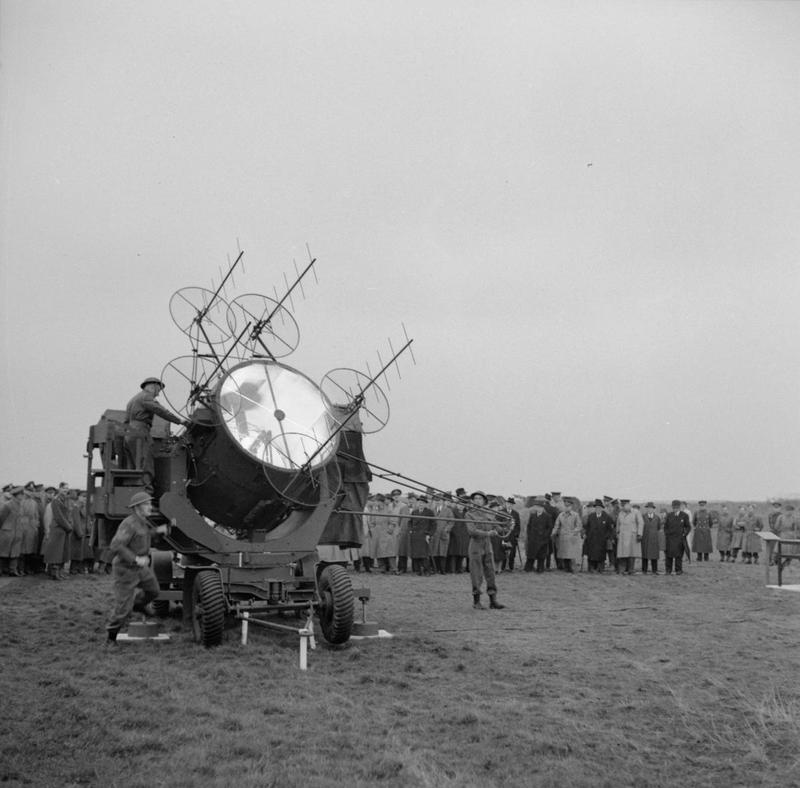
150 cm Searchlight fitted with No. 2 Mk VI SLC radar

After its defeat in the Blitz, the Luftwaffe carried out few night raids over the UK until early 1942 when it began a series of attacks (the so-called Baedeker Blitz) against open cities. Bath, Somerset, was one such target (the Bath Blitz of April 1942), which spilled over onto Bristol and led to some redeployments in 8th AA Division's area.

There was a shake-up of AA Command at the beginning of October 1942, when the AA Divisions were replaced by AA Groups having a wider remit. 69 AA Brigade and 68th S/L Rgt came under 3 AA Group. The regiment returned to the command of 46 AA Bde in March 1943. Luftwaffe penetrations of the Bristol area were now rare, though a number occurred in March 1944 at the time of the 'Little Blitz'.

=== 609 (Monmouthshire) Infantry Regiment, RA ===
As the threat of attack by the weakened Luftwaffe waned, AA Command was forced to release manpower for the planned invasion of Normandy (Operation Overlord). In June 1944 the War Office (WO) warned AA Command that it would have to provide further reinforcements to 21st Army Group fighting in North West Europe. The run-down began in the autumn, when most AA defences in the West of England were dismantled, and on 13 September 1944 68th S/L Rgt was instructed to un-man all its operational sites and concentrate the personnel at Bristol. This was followed by an order for the regiment to lapse into suspended animation on 25 September.

Meanwhile, 21st Army Group's manpower crisis deepened, particularly among the infantry and the WO began reorganising surplus AA regiments in the UK into infantry battalions for duties in the rear areas. On 1 November the order for 68th S/L Rgt to lapse was cancelled and instead it was converted into 68th (Monmouthshire Regiment) Garrison Regiment, RA, on 4 November. Soon afterwards it joined 21st Army Group. In January 1945, the War Office accelerated the conversion of surplus artillery into infantry units for line of communication and occupation duties, thereby releasing trained infantry for frontline service. On 13 February 1945, the regiment was redesignated 609 (Monmouthshire Regiment) Regiment. RA.

The regiment finally entered suspended animation in April 1946.

== Postwar ==
When the TA was reconstituted on 1 January 1947 the regiment reformed at Newport as 603 (Mixed) Heavy Anti-Aircraft Regiment, RA (1st (Rifle) Battalion, The Monmouthshire Regiment), ('Mixed' indicating that members of the Women's Royal Army Corps were integrated into the unit). The regiment formed part of 71 AA Bde (the prewar 45 AA Bde) based at Cardiff.

When AA Command was disbanded on 10 March 1955 there were wholesale amalgamations amongst the TA's AA units. 603 (M) HAA Rgt became P (1 Monmouth) Bty in 283 (Monmouthshire) Field Rgt.

On 1 May 1961 283 Fd Rgt amalgamated with 281 (Glamorgan Yeomanry) Fd Rgt and 282 (Welsh) HAA Rgt to become 282 (Glamorganshire & Monmouthshire) Fd Rgt, in which P Bty became R (1 Monmouth) Bty.

When the TA was reduced into the Territorial and Army Volunteer Reserve (TAVR) in 1967, the combined regiment became 211 (South Wales) Bty in 104 Light Air Defence Rgt, with D (Monmouthshire) Trp at Newport.

== Uniforms and insignia ==
After World War II, 603 (M) HAA Rgt continued to wear the distinctive silver or white metal cap badge of the 1st (Rifle) Bn, Monmouths, together with the Royal Artillery's collar badges. In addition, the buttons and non-commissioned officers' chevrons were black, to denote the unit's ancestry as a Rifle battalion.

== External sources ==
- British Army units from 1945 on
- Orders of Battle at Patriot Files
- Graham Watson, The Territorial Army 1947
