= 393rd =

393rd or 393d may refer to:

- 393rd Bomb Squadron (393 BS) is part of the 509th Bomb Wing at Whiteman Air Force Base, Missouri
- 393rd Bombardment Group, inactive United States Air Force unit
- 393rd Bombardment Squadron (Medium) (1942), inactive United States Air Force unit
- 393rd Fighter Squadron or 179th Fighter Squadron, unit of the Minnesota Air National Guard 148th Fighter Wing located at Duluth Air National Guard Base, Minnesota
- 393rd (Hampshire) Heavy Anti-Aircraft Regiment, Royal Artillery
- 393rd Infantry Regiment (United States), U.S. Army Reserve regiment that is assigned to 75th Infantry Division (Training Support)

== See also ==
- 393 (number)
- 393, the year 393 (CCCXCIII) of the Julian calendar
- 393 BC
