= 5th Anti-Aircraft Division (United Kingdom) =

- Formation sign of the 5th Anti-Aircraft division.
- Active: 1 September 1938–30 September 1942
- Country: United Kingdom
- Branch: Territorial Army
- Type: Anti-Aircraft Division
- Role: Air Defence
- Part of: Anti-Aircraft Command (1938–40); I AA Corps (1940–42)
- Garrison/HQ: Reading, Berkshire
- Engagements: Battle of Britain; The Blitz

The 5th Anti-Aircraft Division (5th AA Division) was an air defence formation of Britain's Territorial Army, created in the period of tension before the outbreak of the Second World War. It defended Southern England during the Battle of Britain and the Blitz.

== Origin ==
Increasing concern during the 1930s about the threat of air attack led to large numbers of units of the part-time Territorial Army (TA) being converted to anti-aircraft (AA) gun and searchlight roles in the Royal Artillery (RA) and Royal Engineers (RE), and higher formations became necessary to control them. One such formation was the 5th AA Division, raised on 1 September 1938 at Reading, Berkshire, to command all the TA AA units in the South, South West and South Midlands of England and South Wales. Its area was roughly aligned with that of No 10 Group of RAF Fighter Command under whose orders Anti-Aircraft Command operated. The formation's first General Officer Commanding (GOC) was Major-General Alan Cunningham.

The divisional badge was a falling black aircraft silhouette trailing red flames, on a khaki background.

== Mobilisation ==
The deterioration in international relations during 1939 led to a partial mobilisation of the TA in June, after which a proportion of TA AA units manned their war stations under a rotation system known as 'Couverture'. Full mobilisation of AA Command came in August 1939, ahead of the declaration of war on 3 September 1939.

=== Equipment ===
On mobilisation in August 1939, the 5th AA Division had the following equipment:

- Heavy AA guns: 106
- Light AA guns
  - 3-inch: 27
  - 40 mm Bofors guns and 2-pounder 'pom-pom': 22
  - Light machine guns (LMGs, mainly Lewis guns) :1186
- Searchlights: 466

The HAA guns were deployed as follows in September 1939:

- Bristol (Docks and Bristol Aeroplane Company): 14 + 4 out of action
- Plymouth (Royal Naval Dockyard): 14
- Portland, Dorset (Royal Naval Dockyard): 2 + 2 out of action
- Portsmouth (Royal Naval Dockyard): 29
- Southampton (Docks and Supermarine Aviation Works): 30
- Holton Heath, Dorset (Royal Navy Cordite Factory): 4
- Bramley, Hampshire (Ordnance Depot): 7

== Phoney War ==
The process of training and equipping the newer AA units had hardly begun when they were mobilised, but the delay in active operations during the autumn and winter of 1939–40 (the Phoney War) gave the AA formations time to address the worst deficiencies. Modern guns remained scarce, however.

=== Equipment ===
By 5 June 1940, just before the start of the Battle of Britain, the 5th AA Division's armament state was:

- HAA
  - 4.5-inch :24
  - 3.7-inch: 93
  - 3-inch: 56
- LAA
  - 3-inch: 28
  - 40 mm Bofors: 4
  - Single Vickers guns: 18
  - LMGs: 386
- S/L
  - 150 cm: 46
  - 90 cm: 535

=== Reorganisation ===
Major-General Cunningham was transferred to the command of an infantry division on 10 January 1940 and was replaced as GOC by Maj-Gen Robert Allen, brought in from the command of the artillery of an infantry division, but who was a former commander of the 48th AA Brigade. (Cunningham went on to command a succession of infantry divisions before becoming GOC East Africa Command and commanding the campaign against the Italians, and then GOC Eighth Army in Operation Crusader.)

The Royal Artillery's AA regiments were redesignated Heavy AA (HAA) in 1940 to distinguish them from the new Light AA (LAA) units being formed. Also the RE and infantry AA (searchlight) battalions were transferred to the RA in August 1940.

In July 1940, after the British Expeditionary Force had been evacuated from Dunkirk, the Regular 5th AA Brigade was reformed in the Gloucester area under 5th AA Division. It was to consist of:

- 85th (Tees) HAA Regiment, RA – from 43rd AA Brigade, 7th AA Division
- 88th HAA Regiment, RA – from 27th (Home Counties) Brigade, 1st AA Division
- 37th (Tyne Electrical Engineers) Searchlight Regiment, RA – from BEF
- 68th Searchlight Regiment, RA – from 45th AA Brigade
- An additional LAA regiment to be formed from the northern part of 35th LAA Regiment (55th LAA Brigade)

Meanwhile, the 46th AA Brigade at Bristol was now to consist of:

- 76th (Gloucestershire) HAA Regiment, RA
- 23rd LAA – from 50th LAA Brigade
- 15th (Isle of Man) LAA Regiment, RA– from 53rd LAA Brigade, 4th AA Division
- 66th (Gloucesters) Searchlight Regiment, RA

== Battle of Britain ==
On 11 July 1940, at the start of the Battle, the 5th AA Division's guns were deployed as follows:

- Cardiff (Docks and industry): 12
- Newport, Wales (Docks and industry) 4
- Brockworth, Gloucestershire (Gloster Aircraft Factory): 36
- Bristol: 36
- Falmouth, Cornwall (Docks): 8
- Plymouth: 18
- Portland: 6
- Holton Heath: 8
- Southampton: 43
- Portsmouth: 44
- Bramley: 8
- Airfields: 20
- Vital points: 136

The Battle of Britain opened with the Luftwaffe attacking shipping and coastal towns by day and bombing ports and industrial cities by night, which involved all of AA Command's divisions. In July the Luftwaffe switched to day raids in strength against ports and Midlands industry. Portland and Portsmouth were regularly raided. On 4 July, Portland was attacked by a continuous flow of Ju 87 Stukas and Ju 88s, lasting two and a half hours, yet none was shot down. But AA Command's shooting and techniques improved with experience. In attacks on Portsmouth on 12 August, six Bf 109s were shot down and a searchlight detachment on the Isle of Wight shot down another with its LMG.

After these preliminary skirmishes, the battle intensified from 13 August with bombing raids primarily directed against Fighter Command's airfields. Some of the greatest battles were fought on 15 August, from South Wales to the Yorkshire Coast, when the 5th AA Division was hotly engaged. On that day Lehrgeschwader 1 (LG 1) made a heavy raid of 70–80 bombers escorted by single- and twin-engined fighters against the South Coast. No. 10 Group scrambled five fighter squadrons and action began at 17.20 over Portland Bill. The Stukas of IV.(St)/LG 1 and escorting Bf 110 Zerstörers of V.(Z)/LG 1 heading for RNAS Worthy Down were attacked out of the sun, dropped a few bombs at Portland and withdrew with heavy losses. The rest of the raid (II.(St)/LG 1) flew on to attack RAF Middle Wallop, causing some damage, but suffering further casualties. Between the fighters and the AA guns at Portsmouth and Southampton, the Geschwader lost 8 bombers, 4 Stukas and 13 Bf 110s, as well as many others damaged. The one-sided action was highly satisfactory for Fighter Command and the 5th AA Division.

Another peak day came on 24 August, when the gunners were in action at Swansea, Cardiff, Bristol, Portland and Bramley, with the Swansea gunners claiming hits. Then on 6 September the Luftwaffe switched its attacks from airfields to London.

The climax of the battle was on 15 September, when massed raids attacked London and suffered severe casualties from the fighters and guns. On the same day there were attacks against Portland and Southampton, and with all available fighters engaged elsewhere, the 5th AA Division had to defend against these on its own.

== Blitz ==
After its crushing losses in day raids, the Luftwaffe switched to night bombing of London and the industrial cities ('The Blitz'), with Southampton, Cardiff and Swansea being among the targets attacked using Knickebein navigation aids. During the Portsmouth Blitz, two bombs dropped directly on a position of the 35th AA Brigade, killing an officer and 10 men, wrecking the command post and one gun. Two of the remaining guns continued to fire by improvised methods.

=== Reorganisation ===
In November 1940, as the Blitz was getting under way, there was a major reorganisation of AA Command. The 5th AA Division's responsibilities were split, with the 8th AA Division created to cover South West England, and the 9th AA Division to cover the South Midlands and South Wales. Thereafter, the 5th AA Division's remit was to concentrate on Southern England. All three divisions came under the command of a newly formed I AA Corps. There were other consequential reorganisations: the 5th AA Divisional Signals divided to form the 8th AA Divisional Signals at Bristol, for example. Major-General Allen moved to command the 8th AA Division and was replaced as GOC by Acting Maj-Gen Robert Pargiter from the 7th AA Division.

== Mid-War ==
=== Fringe and Baedeker raids ===
The Blitz ended in May 1941 when German attention switched to Russia, the Balkans and North Africa. A new Luftwaffe campaign against the mainland UK opened in March 1942, with a series of low-level fighter-bomber attacks against coastal towns, many in the 5th AA Division's area, which had few LAA guns available for defence. Both HAA and LAA guns were moved from all over England to reinforce the naval bases and create new Gun Defended Areas (GDAs) including Winchester and Brighton. As well as these 'Fringe Targets', the Luftwaffe switched night bombers from target to target in what were dubbed 'Baedeker' raids. Newly-formed AA units joined the division, the HAA units increasingly being 'mixed' ones into which women of the Auxiliary Territorial Service were integrated. At the same time, experienced units were posted away for service overseas. This led to a continual turnover of units, which accelerated in 1942 with the preparations for Operation Torch and the need to transfer AA units from North West England to counter the Baedeker raids and the Luftwaffe's hit-and-run attacks against South Coast towns. The increased sophistication of Operations Rooms and communications was reflected in the growth in support units by May 1942. In August 1942, the 27th and 47th AA Brigades were transferred to the 3rd AA Division, a HQ brought down from Scotland to handle the increased workload of combating the 'hit and run' raids.

== Disbandment ==
AA Command was reorganised again in October 1942, when the AA Corps and Divisions were disbanded and replaced by a single-tier 'Group' structure, with each group corresponding to a Group of Fighter Command. The 5th AA Division's role was subsumed into the 3rd AA Group.

The 5th AA Divisional Signals re-amalgamated with the 8th AA Divisional Signals at Bristol, and formed the 3rd AA Group Signals. Postwar the unit became the 57th (City and County of Bristol) Signals Squadron, today part of the 39th (Skinners) Signal Regiment.

== General Officer Commanding ==
The following officers commanded the 5th AA Division:

- Major-General Alan Cunningham (1 September 1938 – 9 January 1940)
- Major-General Robert Allen (10 January–10 November 1940)
- Major-General Robert Pargiter (11 November 1940 – 30 September 1942)

== Order of battle ==
5th Anti-Aircraft Division (August 1939)
- 35th Anti-Aircraft Brigade
  - 56th (Cornwall) Anti-Aircraft Regiment, RA – Heavy Anti-Aircraft (HAA) unit converted from medium artillery in 1932
  - 57th (Wessex) Anti-Aircraft Regiment, RA – HAA unit converted from field artillery in 1932
  - 72nd (Hampshire) Anti-Aircraft Regiment, RA – HAA unit converted from field artillery (originally Yeomanry cavalry) in 1938
  - 48th (Hampshire) Anti-Aircraft Battalion, RE – Searchlight unit converted from fortress engineers in 1937
  - 35th AA Brigade Company, Royal Army Service Corps (RASC)
- 45th Anti-Aircraft Brigade
  - 77th (Welsh) Anti-Aircraft Regiment, RA – HAA unit converted from field artillery in 1938
  - 6th (Glamorgan) Battalion, Welch Regiment (67th Searchlight Regiment) – infantry battalion converted to searchlight (S/L) in 1938
  - 1st (Rifle) Battalion, Monmouthshire Regiment (68th Searchlight Regiment) – infantry battalion converted in 1938
  - No 2 (AASL) Company, Carmarthenshire Fortress Royal Engineers – S/L unit
  - 45th AA Brigade Company, RASC
- 46th Anti-Aircraft Brigade
  - 76th (Gloucestershire) Anti-Aircraft Regiment, RA – HAA unit converted from field artillery in 1938
  - 98th Anti-Aircraft Regiment, RA – new HAA unit formed in 1939
  - 4th (City of Bristol) Battalion, Gloucestershire Regiment (66th Searchlight Regiment) – infantry battalion converted in 1938
  - 46th AA Brigade Company, RASC
- 47th Anti-Aircraft Brigade
  - 80th (Berkshire) Anti-Aircraft Regiment, RA – HAA unit converted from field artillery in 1938
  - 30th (Surrey) Anti-Aircraft Battalion, RE – searchlight battalion formed in 1924
  - 35th (First Surrey Rifles) Anti-Aircraft Battalion, RE – infantry battalion converted in 1935
  - 4th Battalion Queen's Royal Regiment (West Surrey) (63rd Searchlight Regiment) – infantry battalion converted in 1938
  - 72nd (Middlesex) Searchlight Regiment, RA – new unit formed in 1938
  - 47th AA Brigade Company, RASC
- 55th Light Anti-Aircraft Brigade
  - 23rd Light Anti-Aircraft Regiment, RA – new unit formed in 1938
  - 24th Light Anti-Aircraft Regiment, RA – new unit formed in 1938
  - 34th Light Anti-Aircraft Regiment, RA – new unit formed in 1939
  - 35th Light Anti-Aircraft Regiment, RA – new unit formed in 1939
  - 36th Light Anti-Aircraft Regiment, RA – new unit formed in 1939
  - 55th AA Brigade Company, RASC
- 5th AA Divisional Signals, Royal Corps of Signals (RCS) – formed at Reading in 1939; became a 'Mixed' unit in 1941 when women of the Auxiliary Territorial Service were integrated into the unit'
- 5th AA Divisional RASC
- 5th AA Divisional Company, Royal Army Medical Corps
- 5th AA Divisional Workshops, Royal Army Ordnance Corps – Workshop companies became part of the new Royal Electrical and Mechanical Engineers (REME) during 1942

5th Anti-Aircraft Division (November 1940)
- 27th (Home Counties) AA Brigade at Portsmouth – from the 6th AA Division
  - 31st (City of London Rifles) Searchlight Regt
  - 70th (Sussex) Searchlight Regt
- 35th AA Brigade at Portsmouth
  - 72nd (Hampshire) HAA Regt
  - 80th (Berkshire) HAA Regt
  - 118th HAA Regt – new unit formed December 1940
  - 48th (Hampshire) Searchlight Regt
- 47th AA Brigade at Southampton
  - 27th (London Electrical Engineers) Searchlight Regt
  - 30th (Surrey) Searchlight Regt
  - 63rd (Queen's) Searchlight Regt
- 65th AA Brigade at Southampton – new formation
  - 57th (Wessex) HAA Regt
  - 24th LAA Regt
  - 43rd LAA Regt – new unit formed November 1939
  - 58th (Argyll & Sutherland Highlanders) LAA Regt – from BEF
- 5th Anti-Aircraft Z Regiment, Royal Artillery – formed by the 5th AA Division in September 1940, equipped with Z Battery rocket projectiles/
- 5th AA Divisional Signals, RCS

5th Anti-Aircraft Division (1941–42, temporary attachments omitted)
- 5th AA Brigade – joined from the 9th AA Division June 1942
  - 64th (Northumbrian) HAA Rgt – from the 72nd AA Brigade August 1942
  - 97th (London Scottish) HAA Rgt – from the 35th AA Brigade June 1942; left AA Command August 1942, later went to Sicily and Italy
  - 106th HAA Rgt – joined from the 2nd AA Division July 1942
  - 128th HAA Rgt – joined from the 10th AA Division June; to the 2nd AA Division July 1942
  - 143rd (Mixed) HAA Rgt – to the 11th AA Division June 1942
  - 148th (Mixed) HAA Rgt – from the 35th AA Brigade June 1942
  - 46 LAA Rgt – from the 65th AA Brigade June 1942
  - 97th LAA Rgt – from the 65th AA Brigade June 1942
  - 84th LAA Rgt – from the 12th AA Division August 1942
  - 112th LAA Rgt
  - 37th S/L Rgt – to the 11th AA Division June 1942
- 27th AA Brigade
  - 107th HAA Rgt – joined from the 4th AA Division June 1941; to the 35th AA Brigade June 1942
  - 146th HAA Rgt – joined from the 7th AA Division August 1942
  - 124th HAA Rgt – from the 35th AA Brigade autumn 1941
  - 68th LAA Rgt – joined from the 7th AA Division August 1942
  - 98th LAA Rgt – from the 72nd AA Brigade August 1942
  - 132nd LAA Rgt – formed from the 85th S/L Rgt March 1942; to the 6th AA Division June 1942
  - 1 S/L Rgt – joined from the 9th AA Division January 1942
  - 31st S/L Rgt – as above
  - 34th S/L Rgt – as above
  - 35th S/L Rgt – returned summer 1941; to the 47th AA Brigade December 1941
- 35th AA Brigade
  - 54th (City of London) HAA Rgt – joined from the 1st AA Division autumn 1941; returned to the 1st AA Division February 1942
  - 57th HAA Rgt – left for the 1st AA Division autumn 1941
  - 72nd HAA Rgt – left for the 6th AA Division December 1941
  - 80th HAA Rgt – left AA Command July 1941; later went to North Africa
  - 97th (London Scottish) HAA Rgt – joined from the 1st AA Division March 1942; to the 5th AA Brigade June 1942
  - 101st HAA Rgt – joined from the 6th AA Division July 1942; left for the 1st AA Division August 1942
  - 104th HAA Rgt – joined from the 8th AA Division December 1941, left for the 6th AA Division April 1942
  - 107th HAA Brigade – from the 27th AA Brigade June 1942
  - 124th HAA Rgt – new unit formed March 1941; to the 27th AA Brigade autumn 1941
  - 148 (Mixed) HAA Rgt – new unit formed February 1942; to 5 AA Brigade June 1942
  - 151st (Mixed) HAA Rgt – from the 4th AA Division July 1942
  - 157th (Mixed) HAA Rgt – new unit formed May 1942;
  - 160th (Mixed) HAA Rgt – new unit formed June 1942;
  - 48th S/L Rgt – from the 47th AA Brigade August 1942
  - 5th AA 'Z' Rgt – as above
- 47th AA Brigade
  - 35th S/L Rgt – from the 27th AA Brigade December 1941
  - 48th S/L Rgt – to the 35th AA Brigade August 1942
  - 63rd S/L Rgt (Queens) – left for the 1st AA Division autumn 1941
  - 70th S/L Rgt – as above
- 65th AA Brigade – left for the 10th AA Division May 1942
  - 23rd LAA Rgt – left AA Command December 1941, later went to Ceylon
  - 24th LAA Rgt – left for the 8th AA Division summer 1941
  - 35th LAA Rgt – returned from the 55th AA Brigade summer, left for Far East December 1941 and captured on Java
  - 43rd LAA Rgt – left for the 6th AA Division June 1941
  - 46th LAA Rgt – from the 55th AA Brigade summer 1941
  - 60th LAA Rgt – joined from the 12th AA Division autumn 1941
  - 80th LAA Rgt – new unit formed August 1941; left for the 9th AA Division December 1941
  - 81st LAA Rgt – joined from the 6th AA Division March 1942
  - 97th LAA Rgt – new unit formed November 1941 to the 5th AA Brigade June 1942
- 72nd AA Brigade – new formation, joined June 1942
  - 50th (Northamptonshire Regiment) S/L Rgt – joined June 1942
  - 64th (Northumbrian) HAA Rgt – joined June 1942; to the 5th AA Brigade August 1942
  - 157th (Mixed) HAA Rgt – joined June 1942
  - 19th LAA Rgt – joined June 1942
  - 110th LAA Rgt – joined August 1942
  - 123rd LAA Rgt – joined August 1942

5th Anti-Aircraft Division (May 1942), temporary attachments omitted)
- 5th AA Division Mixed Signal Unit HQ, RCS
  - HQ No 1 Company
    - 5th AA Division Mixed Signal Office Section
    - 27th AA Brigade Signal Office Mixed Sub-Section
    - 108th RAF Fighter Sector Sub-Section
    - 111th RAF Fighter Sector Sub-Section
    - 308th AA Gun Operations Room Mixed Signal Section
    - 346th AA Gun Operations Room Mixed Signal Section
    - 47th AA Brigade Signal Office Mixed Sub-Section
    - 109t RAF Fighter Sector Sub-Section
    - 313th AA Gun Operations Room Mixed Signal Section
    - 13th AA Line Maintenance Section
  - HQ No 2 Company
    - 112th AA Gun Operations Room Mixed Signal Section
    - 33rd AA Sub-Gun Operations Room Mixed Signal Sub-Section
    - 5th AA Brigade Signal Office Mixed Sub-Section
    - 409th AA Gun Operations Room Mixed Signal Section
    - 35th AA Brigade Signal Office Mixed Sub-Section
    - 303rd AA Gun Operations Room Mixed Signal Section
    - 72nd AA Brigade Signal Office Mixed Sub-Section
    - 14th AA Line Maintenance Section
- HQ 5th AA Div RASC
  - 183rd, 916th Companies
- 5th AA Div RAMC
- 5th AA Div Workshop Company, RAOC
- 5th AA Div Radio Maintenance Company, RAOC (The RAOC companies became part of the new Royal Electrical and Mechanical Engineers (REME) during 1942.)
