= 48th (Hampshire) Searchlight Regiment, Royal Artillery =

48th (Hampshire) AA Battalion, RE 48th (Hampshire) Searchlight Regiment, RA 636 (Hampshire) Infantry Regiment, RA 583 (Hampshire) Heavy AA Regiment, RA
- Cap Badge of the Royal Artillery (pre-1953)
- Active: 1 November 1937–10 March 1955
- Country: United Kingdom
- Branch: Territorial Army
- Type: Searchlights; Heavy Anti-Aircraft artillery
- Role: Air Defence
- Part of: 35 AA Brigade
- Engagements: The Blitz; Operation Diver; North West Europe

48th (Hampshire) Searchlight Regiment, Royal Artillery was an air defence unit of Britain's Territorial Army (TA) formed just before the outbreak of World War II from existing searchlight companies of the Royal Engineers. It served in Anti-Aircraft Command until 1944, including the Portsmouth Blitz and Operation Diver. At the end of the war, it formed an infantry unit for garrison duties in liberated Europe. It continued in the postwar TA until AA Command was disbanded in 1955.

== Origin ==
90 cm Projector Anti-Aircraft, displayed at Fort Nelson, Hampshire.

In the 1930s, the increasing need for anti-aircraft (AA) defence for Britain's cities was addressed by converting a number of TA units into searchlight (S/L) battalions of the Royal Engineers (RE). One unit selected for was the Hampshire (Fortress) Royal Engineers, which already operated searchlights in the coast defence and AA defence roles in Portsmouth. On 1 November 1937, three of its companies, together with a newly-formed company in Southampton, became 48th (Hampshire) AA Battalion, RE with the following organisation:

- HQ at Portsmouth
- 391st Anti-Aircraft Company at Portsmouth
- 392nd Anti-Aircraft Company at East Cowes, Isle of Wight
- 393rd Anti-Aircraft Company at Gosport
- 394th Anti-Aircraft Company at Southampton

The following year, the battalion came under the command of 35th AA Brigade, based at Fareham, which formed part of 5th AA Division.

== World War II ==
=== Mobilisation ===
The TA's AA units were mobilised on 23 September 1938 during the Munich Crisis, with units manning their emergency positions within 24 hours, even though many did not yet have their full complement of men or equipment. The emergency lasted three weeks, and they were stood down on 13 October. In February 1939 the existing AA defences came under the control of a new Anti-Aircraft Command. In June, a partial mobilisation of TA units was begun in a process known as 'couverture', whereby each AA unit did a month's tour of duty in rotation to man selected AA and searchlight positions. On 24 August, ahead of the declaration of World War II, AA Command was fully mobilised at its war stations.

The AA Battalions of the RE were transferred to the Royal Artillery (RA) on 1 August 1940, so the unit was redesignated 48th (Hampshire) Searchlight Regiment, RA.

Formation sign of 5th AA Division.

=== Blitz ===
During the Portsmouth Blitz of 1940–41, 35 AA Bde was responsible for the AA defence of the city and dockyards.

The regiment supplied a cadre of experienced officers and men to 231st S/L Training Rgt at Blandford Camp, where it provided the basis for a new 522 S/L Bty formed on 14 November 1940. This battery later joined 85th S/L Rgt.

By the end of the Blitz, in May 1941, 48th S/L Rgt was part of 47 AA Bde in 5th AA Division with 391, 392, 393, 394 S/L Btys under command, and remained there for a year. 47 AA Bde was a purely S/L formation covering the area round Southampton.

=== Mid-War ===
In May 1942, 47 AA Bde acquired heavy and light AA gun units in addition to its S/L layout. The following month a new 72 AA Bde joined 5th AA Division, and 393 S/L Bty was temporarily attached to it. In September 1942, AA Command was reorganised and its divisions abolished; at the time of these changes, 48 S/L Rgt went back to 35 AA Bde but returned to the command of 47 AA Bde by December; both were in the new 2 AA Group covering South-East England.

By early 1944, AA Command was being forced to release manpower for overseas service, particularly Operation Overlord (the planned Allied invasion of Normandy) and most S/L regiments lost one of their four batteries; on 6 March 1944 394 S/L Bty began disbanding, completing the process by 3 April. 48th S/L Rgt remained with 47 AA Bde in 2 AA Gp until May 1944, when it returned to 35 AA Bde, now under 6 AA Group. This HQ had been brought down from Scotland and given responsibility for the 'Overlord' ports and assembly camps in the Solent–Portsmouth area, which had been bombed a number of times during the 'Baby Blitz' of early 1944.

=== Operation Diver ===
Shortly after D Day, the first V-1 flying bombs (codenamed 'Divers') were launched against London, and the defences of 2 and 6 AA Groups were reorganised in Operation Diver to combat these. 6 AA Group moved 48th S/L Rgt from 35 AA Bde to 67 AA Bde by mid-August. 6 AA Group's importance diminished after 21st Army Group overran the V-1 launch sites in Northern France and the 'Diver' offensive switched to the East Coast, and it was disbanded in early December 1944.

=== 636 (Hampshire) Infantry Regiment, RA ===
By the end of 1944, the German Luftwaffe was suffering from such shortages of pilots, aircraft and fuel that serious aerial attacks on the United Kingdom could be discounted. At the same time, 21st Army Group fighting in North West Europe was suffering a severe manpower shortage, particularly among the infantry. In January 1945, the War Office began to reorganise surplus anti-aircraft and coastal artillery regiments in the UK into infantry battalions, primarily for line of communication and occupation duties, thereby releasing trained infantry for frontline service. On 23 January 1945, 48th S/L Regiment became 636 (Hampshire) Infantry Regiment, RA, under command of 306 Infantry Brigade (formerly 55 AA Bde).

In February, the surplus (older or unfit) men were sent to Bursledon, near Southampton, where 82nd S/L Rgt was acting as a holding unit. The lights and vehicles were sent away and the men remained with that regiment while they were awaiting posting or demobilisation. The regiment's Auxiliary Territorial Service (ATS) women were posted to AA brigade HQs.

After infantry training, the infantry battalion landed on the Continent on 7 May 1945 (the day before VE Day, and was assigned to Line of Communication duties with 21st Army Group.

== Postwar ==
=== 583 (Hampshire) Heavy Anti-Aircraft Regiment ===
636 Regiment was placed in suspended animation in 1946. When the TA was reconstituted on 1 January 1947 it reformed as 583 (Hampshire) (Mixed) Heavy Anti-Aircraft Regiment (the 'Mixed' indicating that members of the Women's Royal Army Corps were integrated into the unit). Now equipped with Heavy Anti-Aircraft (HAA) guns, the regiment formed part of 73 AA Brigade (the former 47 AA Bde), based at Reading, Berkshire, though this brigade was disbanded in 1948.

=== 675 (Hampshire) Heavy Anti-Aircraft Regiment ===
With the reconstitution of the TA in 1947, there was a proposal to reform the 69th (Duke of Connaught's Hampshire) Anti-Tank Regiment as 393 HAA Regiment, but a change of plan saw a completely new Hampshire unit raised with the number 393, soon changed to 675th (Hampshire) (Mixed) Heavy Anti-Aircraft Regiment, with its HQ at Southampton and forming part of 61 AA Brigade (the former 35 AA Bde at Fareham). However, the 1950s saw the rapid reduction in AA units, and 675 HAA was absorbed by 583 HAA on 1 January 1954. Little more than a year later, AA Command itself was disbanded (on 10 March 1955), and 583 (Hampshire) HAA Regiment was disbanded at the same time.

== External Sources ==
- British Army units from 1945 on
- British Military History
- Graham Watson, The Territorial Army 1947
- The Royal Artillery 1939–45
