= Exeter Blitz =

1942 air raids in Exeter, England

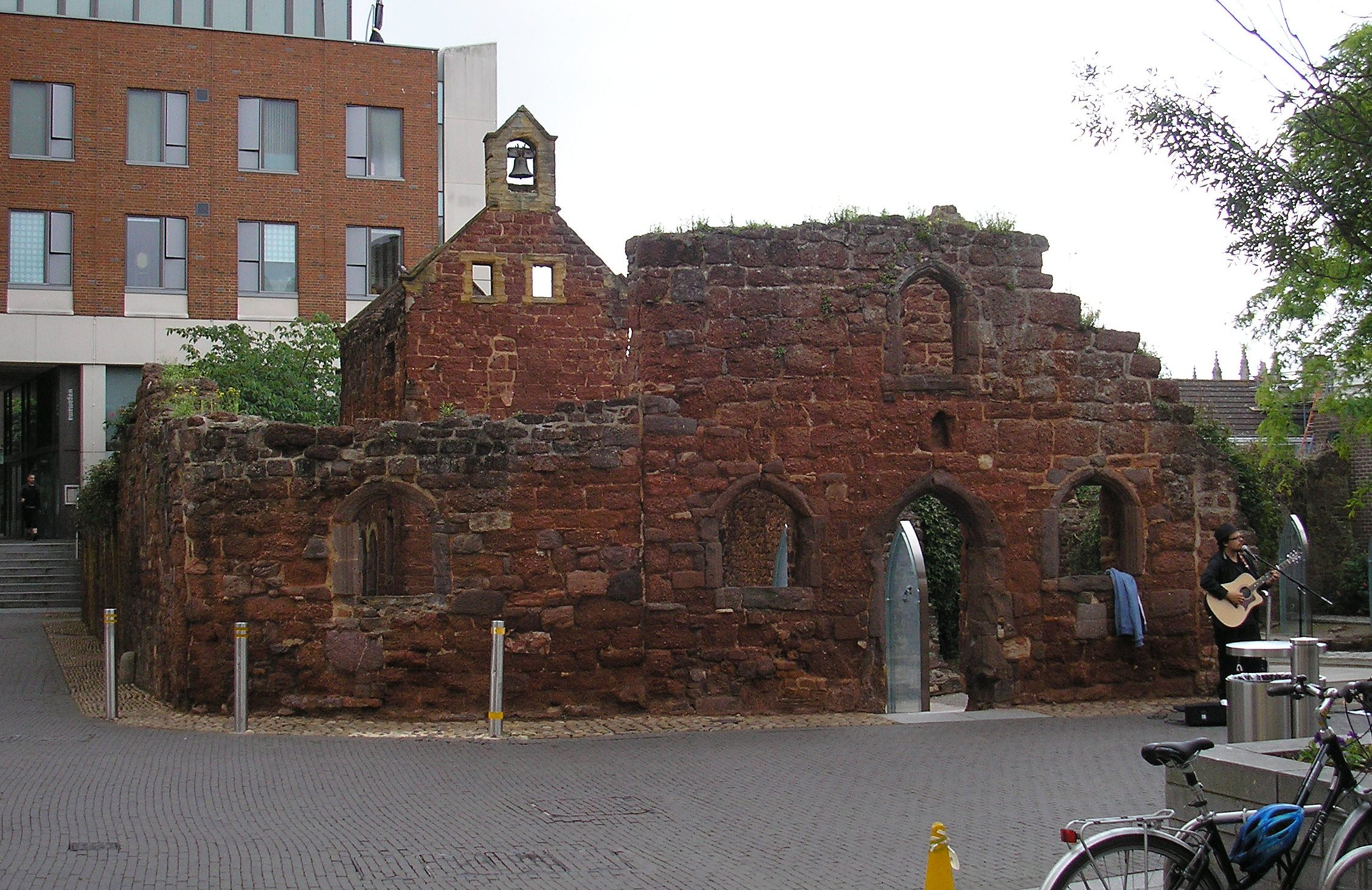
The ruins of St Catherine's Almshouses, preserved amongst modern buildings as a memorial of the Blitz

The term Exeter Blitz refers to the air raids by the German Luftwaffe on the British city of Exeter, Devon, during the Second World War. The city was bombed in April and May 1942 as part of the so-called "Baedeker raids", in which targets were chosen for their cultural and historical, rather than their strategic or military, value.

== Early raids ==
The first German air raid on Exeter took place on 7 August 1940, in the early stages of the Battle of Britain. A lone raider dropped a stick of five bombs on the St Thomas area of the town, causing little damage. The local paper reported one man was injured and a canary and several chickens were killed. A further 18 raids were made against the city over the next 18 months, mostly hit-and-run raids by lone raiders. Exeter was little affected during the Blitz, the German night-bombing offensive against Britain's cities, though nearby Plymouth was severely damaged in early 1941.

This changed in 1942 when Exeter became the first target of the so-called "Baedeker Blitz", a campaign to attack targets of cultural and historical, rather than military or strategic, value. The raids took place in retaliation for the bombing of Lübeck by the RAF earlier that year.

== April 1942 ==
On the night of 23/24 April 1942, 49 bombers of KG2, KG106, led by the pathfinders of I/KG100 took part. However, due to heavy cloud most of the raiders missed their targets and little damage was done. Seven bombs fell on the St Thomas and Marsh Barton areas: 200 houses were damaged and five people were killed, with eight injured. One raider, a Do 17, was shot down by an RAF night fighter, a Beaufighter from 604 Squadron.

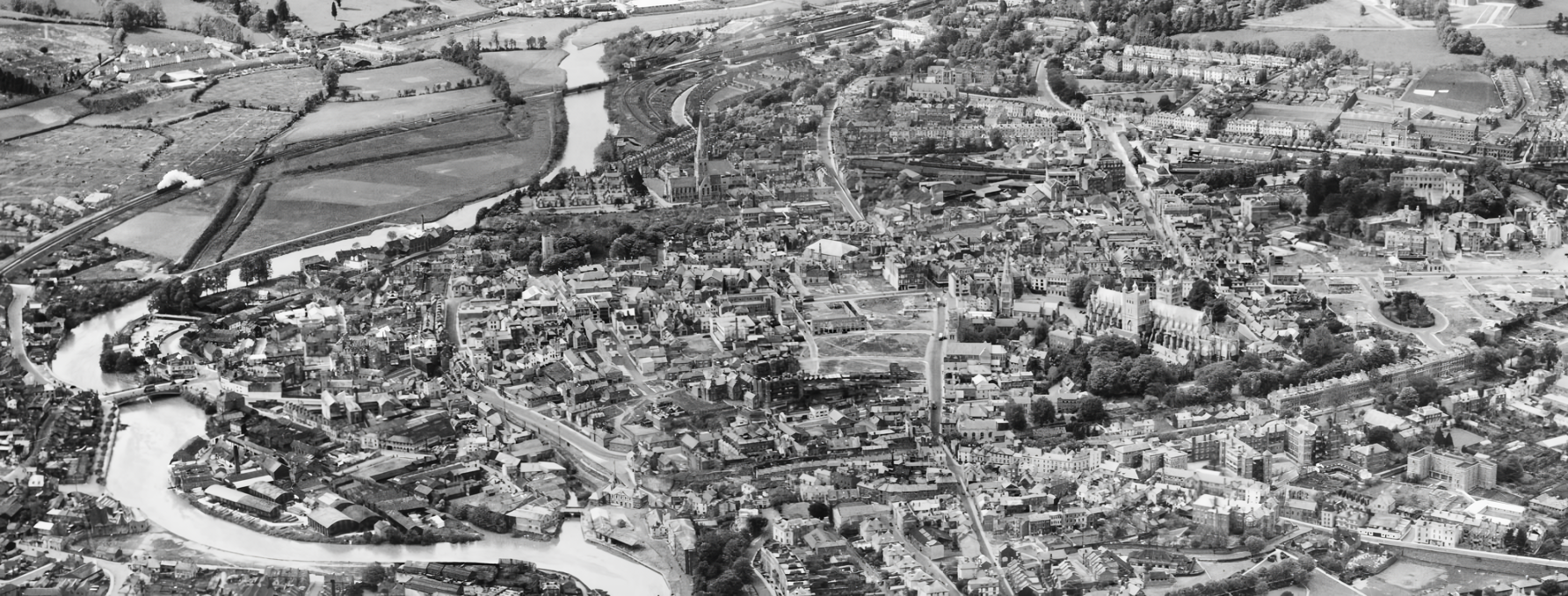
Exeter after the war, late 1940s

The following night, 24/25 April, was clear, and two waves of 20 bombers, most flying two sorties during the night, attacked again. In good visibility, and at low level in the absence of any AA defence, they hit the city, particularly the Pennsylvania area, killing 73 and injuring 54. Four raiders were shot down, three by night fighters and one over Portland by AA fire. After this the Luftwaffe switched its attention elsewhere, attacking Bath, York and Norwich, before returning to Exeter in early May.

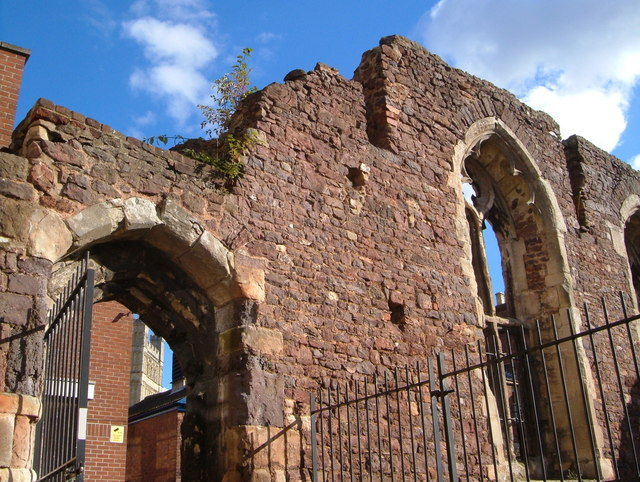
Remains of the Hall of the Vicars Choral in South Street

== May 1942 ==
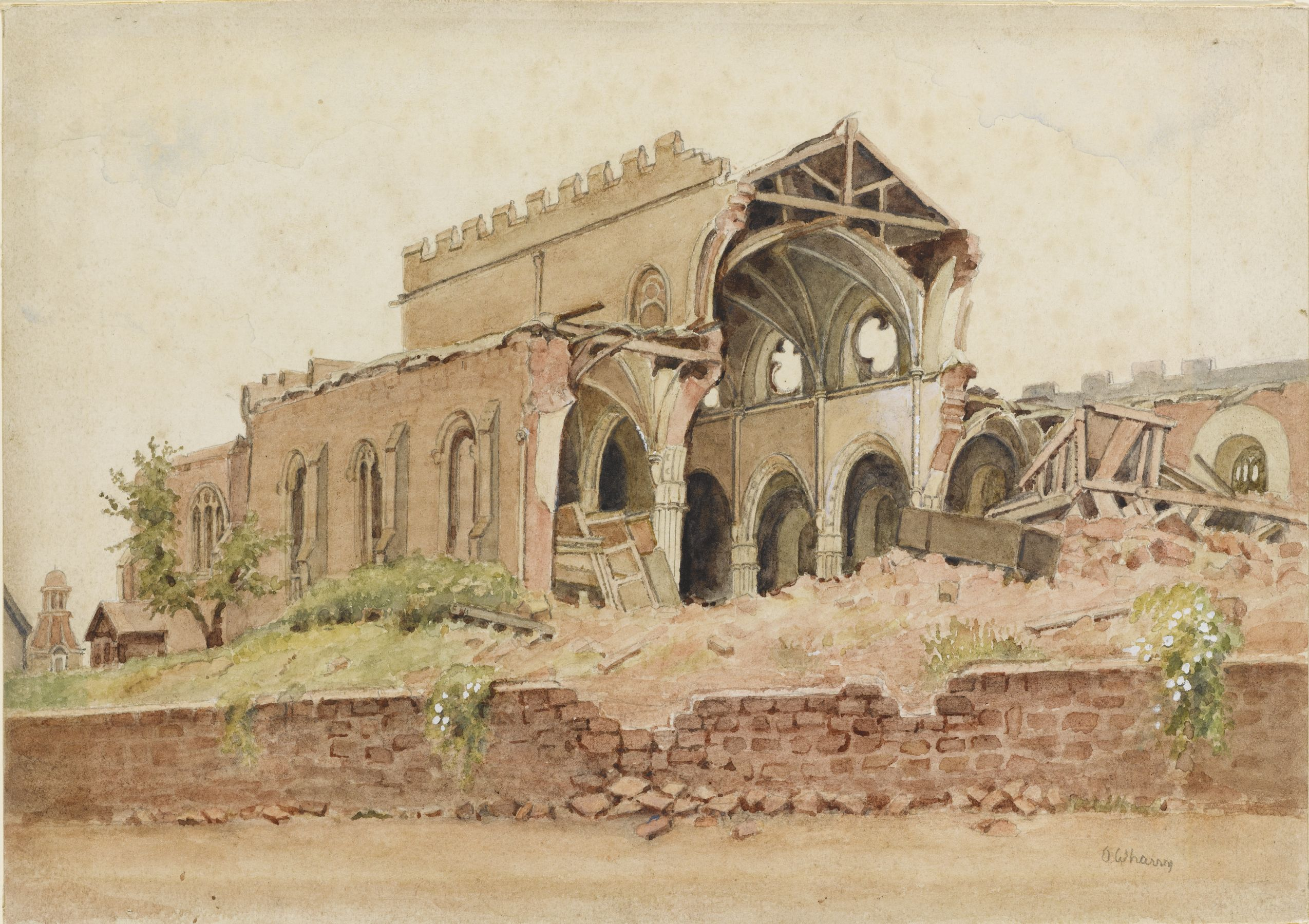
Watercolour by Olive Wharry circa 1942 of St. Sidwell's Church, Exeter, after the Blitz. In the early hours of 4 May 1942, a 250 kg bomb fell directly on St Sidwells. The church tower was left standing but was so badly damaged that it was pulled down shortly after. A replacement church was built on the site.

On the night of 3/4 May 1942, just after midnight, 20 bombers arrived over the town centre, and in 70 minutes devastated the town centre and Newtown area. Bombs fell in High St, Sidwell St and Fore St, starting fires in the houses and shops there, which were soon out of control. Fire brigade and emergency services struggled to tame the fires, under the threat of unexploded ordnance and despite strafing by German bombers. Reinforcements from the fire services at Torquay and Plymouth arrived to help; eventually 195 appliances and 1,080 personnel were employed to bring the fires under control, which was largely achieved by 5 May, though sporadic outbreaks continued until mid-day of 7 May. Around thirty acres (twelve hectares) of the city were devastated, 156 people were killed and 583 injured.

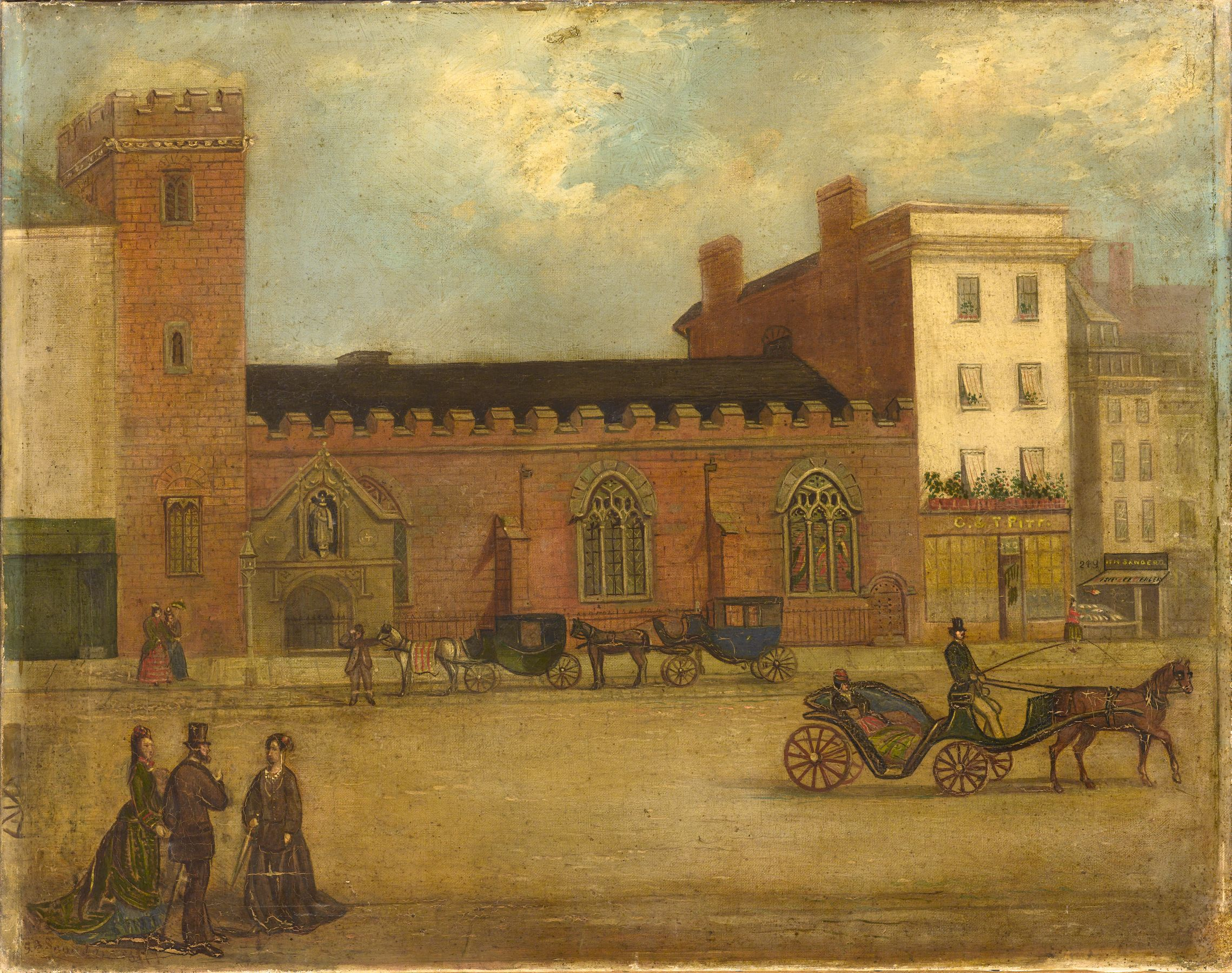
St Lawrence Church, High St, Exeter painted by an unknown author. This painting depicts Exeter's High Street complete with people and horse-drawn carriages. St Lawrence Church is in the background. St Lawrence Church, which predated the thirteenth-century, was destroyed on 4 May 1942.

In the city centre, much of Bedford Circus, the top of High Street, and adjacent parts of Sidwell Street and Paris Street were destroyed. A second area at the top of Fore Street and much of South Street was also obliterated. Between these two areas, the Cathedral was only hit by one high explosive bomb, which demolished St James's Chapel on its southern side. The City Library, with over a million documents and books was destroyed, as was the College of the Vicars Choral.

One bomb fell in Hoopern Fields close to the university Washington Singer laboratories, and the crater is still visible today.

In all 1,500 of the city's 20,000 houses were obliterated and 2,700 badly damaged. Also 400 shops, almost 150 offices, 50 warehouses and 36 pubs were also destroyed.

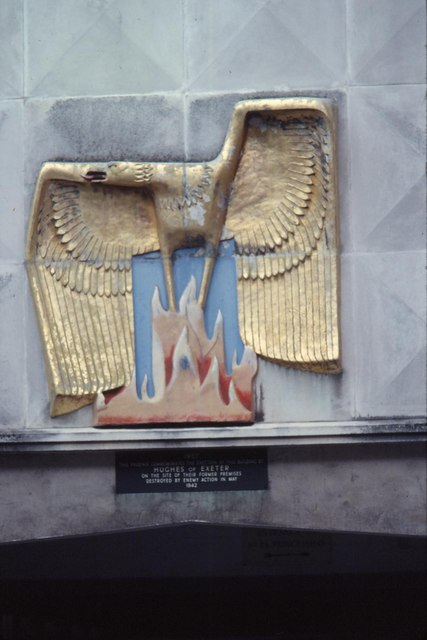
The Exeter Phoenix memorial in Princesshay, representing the reconstruction of the city after WWII

== Conclusion ==
Following the raid of 3/4 May 1942 German radio declared "Exeter is the jewel of the west; we have destroyed that jewel, and we will return to finish the job". Despite this boast, however, the May 1942 air raid was the last suffered by the city; Germany's Baedeker blitz continued in desultory fashion for the next two years, but became increasingly ineffective in the face of the RAF's growing night fighter defences.

In total, the nineteen air attacks on Exeter caused the death of 265 people and injuries to 687, of which 111 were serious. A large part of the city centre had been devastated, and it was some 20 years before repairs were fully completed, resulting in a completely new infrastructure.

== Sources ==
- Price, Alfred (1977). Blitz on Britain 1939-1945. Ian Allan.
- Thomas, Peter (2002). Exeter Burning. The Exeter Blitz Illustrated (2nd ed.). Halsgrove. ISBN 1-84114-157-7.
