= 359th Siege Battery, Royal Garrison Artillery =

359th Siege Battery, RGA
- Cap Badge of the Royal Regiment of Artillery
- Active: January 1917–1919
- Country: United Kingdom
- Branch: British Army
- Role: Siege Artillery
- Part of: Royal Garrison Artillery
- Garrison/HQ: Lavernock
- Engagements: Western Front (World War I)

The 359th Siege Battery was a unit of Britain's Royal Garrison Artillery (RGA) raised during World War I. It operated heavy railway howitzers on the Western Front in 1917 and 1918,

== Mobilisation ==
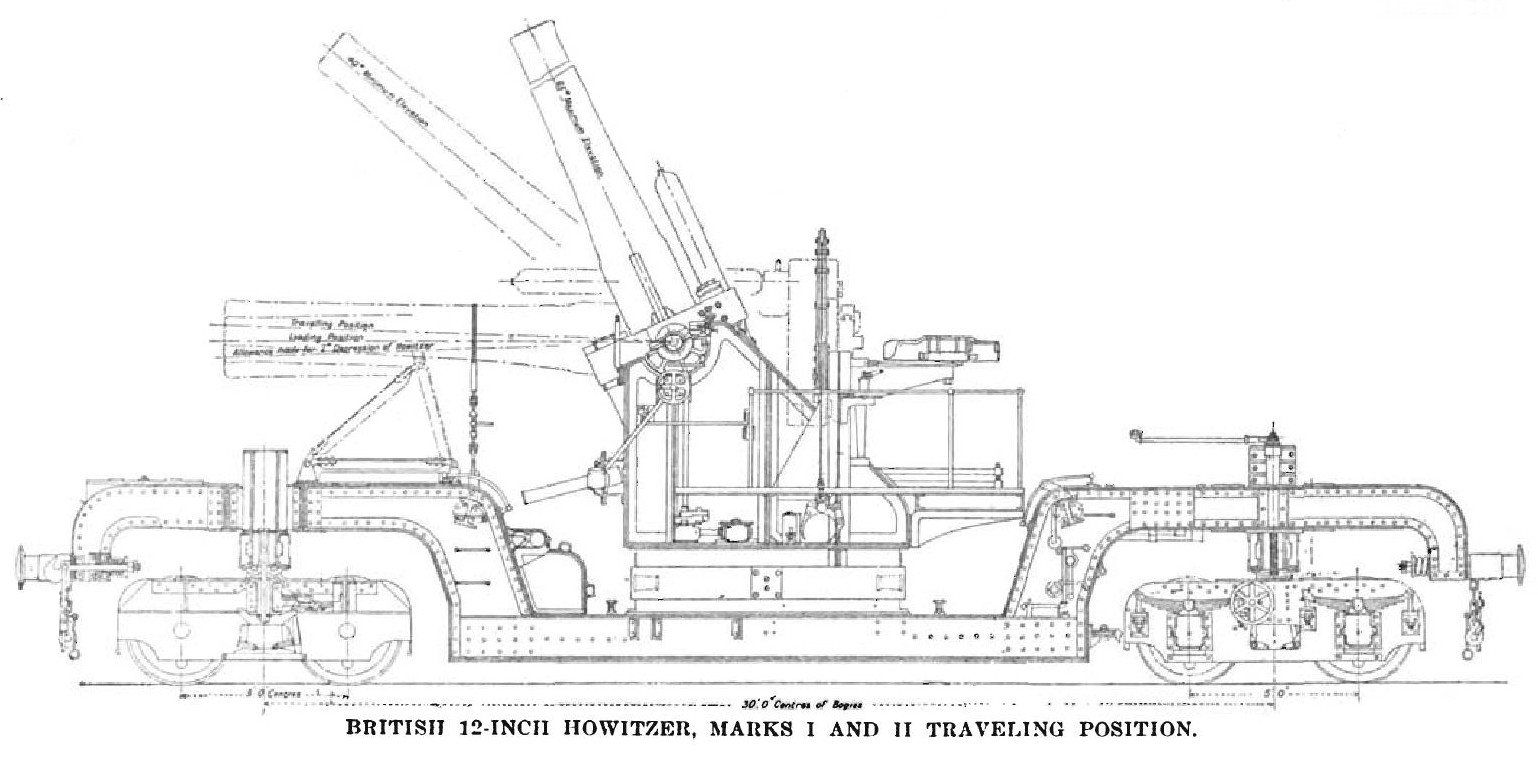
The BL 12-inch Mk I–III railway howitzer.

The battery was raised at Lavernock on 21 January 1917 under the auspices of the Glamorgan Royal Garrison Artillery, a unit of the Territorial Force (TF) serving in No 26 Coastal Fire Command in South Wales, responsible for the defence of Swansea, Cardiff and Barry. Since 1914 the TF's coastal defence units had been supplying cadres of trained gunners to form new batteries of RGA siege guns for service on the Western Front. The Glamorgan RGA had already formed at least three such batteries (96th, 121st, and 172nd).

Battery Sergeant-Major (BSM) George Evans, a TF veteran who had already seen active service, served as the provisional commander. In early February, 1917, 2nd Lt George Rae and 2nd L. Robert C. Palmer were the first two officers assigned to the battery.

Originally established as an 8-inch howitzer battery, the unit was reformed as a 12-inch railway howitzer battery while training at Lydd Ranges in April and May 1917.

== War Service ==
The men of 359th Siege Battery went out to the Western Front on 10 June 1917, embarking on the troopship SS Archangel from Southampton and arriving at Le Havre the following day. It joined 19th Heavy Artillery Group (HAG) on 27 June, manning two 12-inch railway howitzers, and 19th HAG joined XV Corps on the Flanders coast on 1 July. On 5 July, King George V and the Prince of Wales inspected the battery. While on the Flanders coast 359th Siege Bty was variously positioned at Coxyde (Koksijde), Oost Dunkerque (Oostduinkerke) and Nieuport (Nieuwpoort).

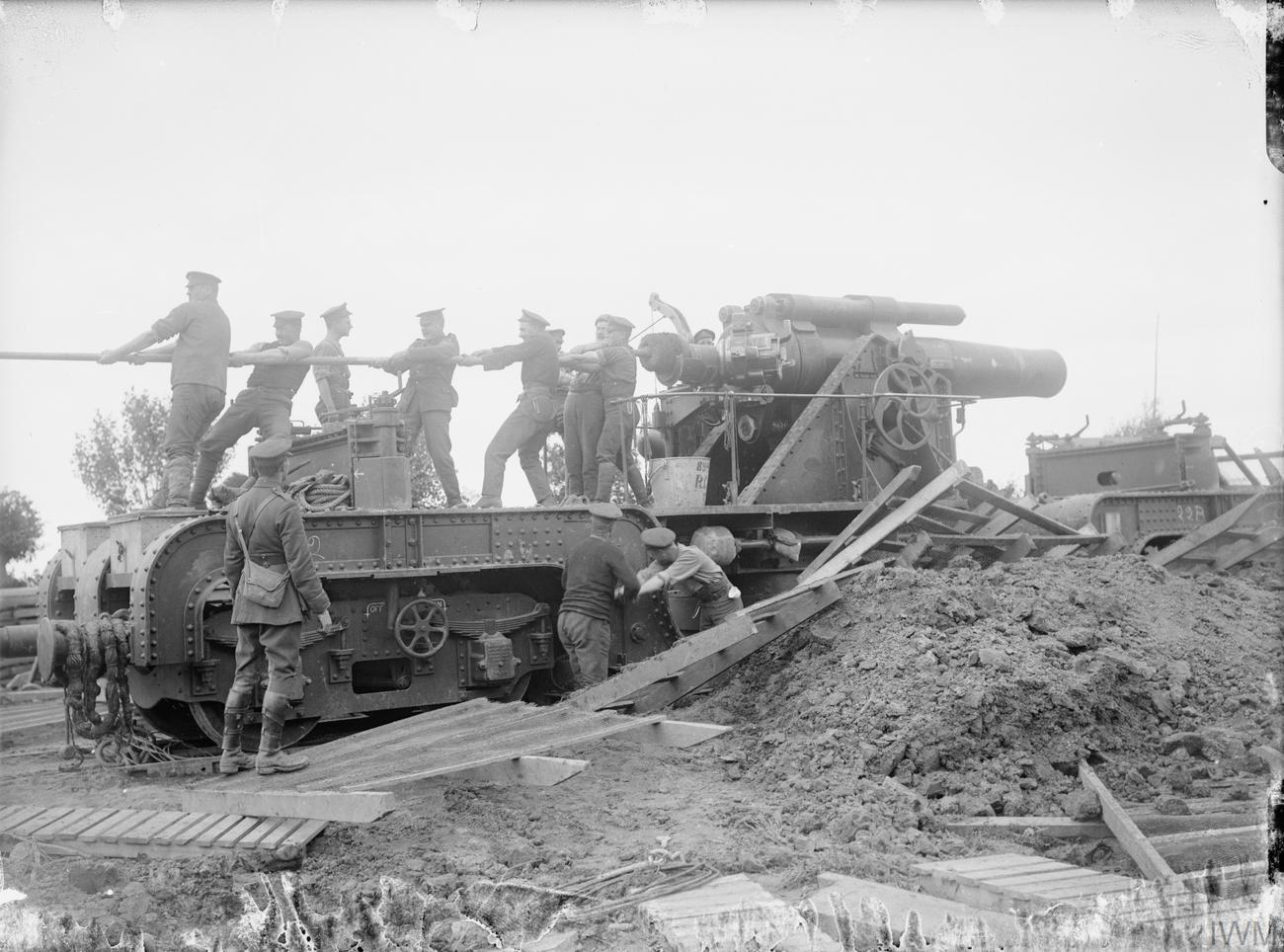
Loading a 12-inch railway howitzer on the Western Front.

19th Heavy Artillery Group transferred south to join Fourth Army on 1 August. The battery was without its guns from 8 to 20 September, and then it joined 76th HAG with Second Army in the Ypres Salient on 21 September, moving to the command of 5th HAG on 28 September. It was separated from its guns again from 1 until 22 October, by which time Second Army was fighting the last stages of the Battle of Passchendaele. On 14 November the battery transferred to 80th HAG, but that headquarters was sent to the Italian Front, so the battery came under the command of 84th HAG on 21 November, and finally of 11th HAG on 18 December. In January 1918, the battery became 'Army Troops' and was no longer attached to a Heavy Artillery Group.

While in the Ypres Salient, 359th Siege Bty was positioned at different times at Vierstraat, Oaten Wood, Passchendaele, Wytschaete Ridge, Verbrandenmolen, Voormezele, Borre Yard, and Wulverghem. At Voormezele, on the evening of 3 April 1918, BSM Evans and four others were killed by one enemy artillery shell. Wulverghem was the last position for the 359th, because rail tracks could not be laid fast enough to keep the railway guns within range of the retreating enemy during the Allies' Hundred Days Offensive. It was still serving with Second Army when the Armistice came into force in November 1918.

The men of 359th Siege Artillery returned home to Wales some time after 16 December 1918, and the battery was disbanded in 1919.
