= 359th Division =

359th Division may refer to:

- 359th Infantry Division, Wehrmacht, Germany
- 359th Rifle Division, Soviet Union

== See also ==
- List of military divisions by number
- 359th (disambiguation)
