= 359th Regiment =

359th Regiment may refer to:

- 359th Infantry Regiment, United States
- 359th (4th West Lancashire) Medium Regiment, Royal Artillery

== See also ==
- 359th (disambiguation)
