= 2nd Glamorganshire Artillery Volunteers =

2nd Glamorganshire Artillery Volunteers Glamorgan Royal Garrison Artillery 531st (Glamorgan) Coast Regiment, RA
- Cap Badge of the Royal Regiment of Artillery
- Active: 1890–1942
- Country: United Kingdom
- Branch: Volunteer Force/Territorial Force
- Role: Coast Artillery
- Part of: Royal Garrison Artillery
- Garrison/HQ: Cardiff

Commanders
- Notable commanders: Sir Edward Hill, VD

The 2nd Glamorganshire Artillery Volunteers was a part-time unit of the British Army that defended the coast of South Wales from 1890 to 1942. Although it never saw action in its coastal defence role, it formed several siege batteries of heavy howitzers for service on the Western Front and Italian Front in World War I.

== Volunteer Force ==
The enthusiasm for the Volunteer movement following an invasion scare in 1859 saw the creation of many units composed of part-time soldiers eager to supplement the Regular British Army in time of need. A number of Artillery Volunteer Corps (AVCs) were formed for coastal defence in South Wales, and by the 1880s they had been consolidated as the 1st Glamorganshire Artillery Volunteer Corps of 17 batteries. In 1890 the unit's headquarters (HQ) moved from Cardiff to Swansea, and the batteries grouped round Cardiff were separated to form a new 2nd Glamorganshire AVC. (Note: The original 2nd Glamorganshire AVC had been formed at Briton Ferry on 2 June 1860, and later established batteries at Skewen and Neath before being absorbed into the 1st in 1880.) After reorganisation these became 11 batteries (companies from 1891) distributed as follows:

- HQ and Nos 1–7 Companies at Cardiff
- No 8 Company at Bridgend and Tondu
- Nos 9 and 10 Companies at Penarth
- No 11 Company at Barry

Sir Edward Hill, VD, MP, who had been Lieutenant-Colonel Commandant of the 1st Glamorganshire since 22 July 1864, retained the position with both units after 1 June 1890, though each had its own lieutenant-colonel and Honorary Colonel.

The new unit formed part of the Western Division of the Royal Artillery (RA). In 1899 the artillery volunteers became part of the Royal Garrison Artillery (RGA) and when the divisional structure was abolished the Cardiff unit was designated the 2nd Glamorganshire RGA (Volunteers) on 1 January 1902.

== Territorial Force ==
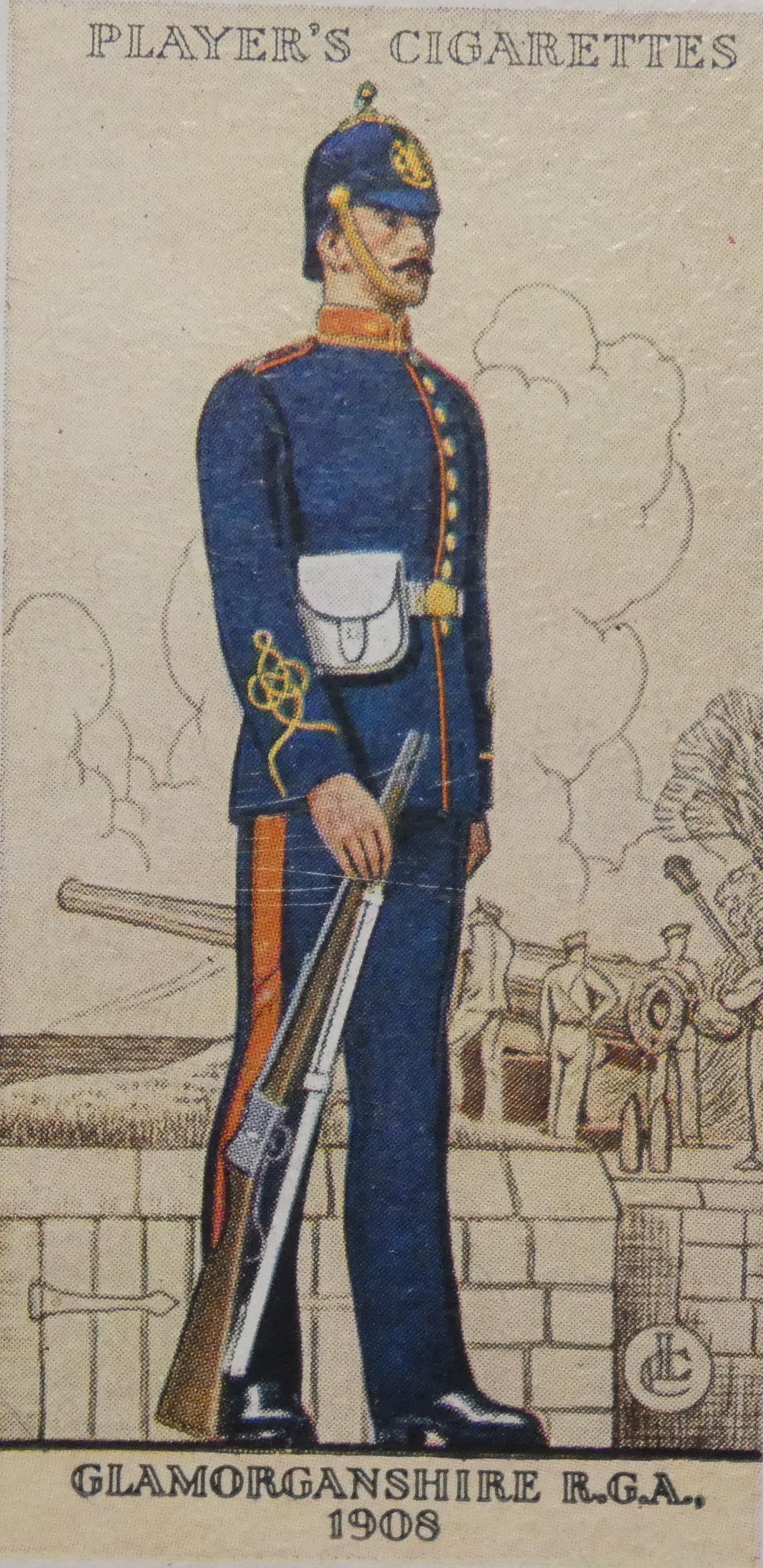
A gunner of the Glamorganshire Royal Garrison Artillery in dress uniform, 1908

When the Volunteer Force was subsumed into the new Territorial Force (TF) under the Haldane Reforms of 1908, the 1st Glamorganshire transferred to the Royal Field Artillery and the 2nd Glamorganshire became the Glamorgan and Pembroke RGA. The 'Pembroke' part of the title was dropped in 1910 when a separate Pembroke RGA of three companies was formed. The Glamorgan RGA was designated as a Defended Ports unit in Western Coast Defences, which was based at Pembroke Dock, and it had the following organisation:

- HQ at Cardiff
- Nos 1–3 Companies at Cardiff
- No 4 Company at Penarth
- No 5 Company at Barry

== World War I ==
=== Mobilisation ===
The Glamorgan RGA mobilised in August 1914 as part of No 26 Coastal Fire Command, responsible for the following guns:

- Cardiff – 4 x 6-inch guns
- Barry – 2 x 6-inch guns
- Swansea – 2 x 4.7-inch QF guns

After the outbreak of war, TF units were invited to volunteer for Overseas Service and on 15 August 1914, the War Office (WO) issued instructions to separate those men who had signed up for Home Service only, and form these into reserve units. On 31 August, the formation of a reserve or 2nd Line unit was authorised for each 1st Line unit where 60 per cent or more of the men had volunteered for Overseas Service. The titles of these 2nd Line units would be the same as the original, but distinguished by a '2/' prefix. In this way duplicate brigades, companies and batteries were created, mirroring those TF formations being sent overseas.

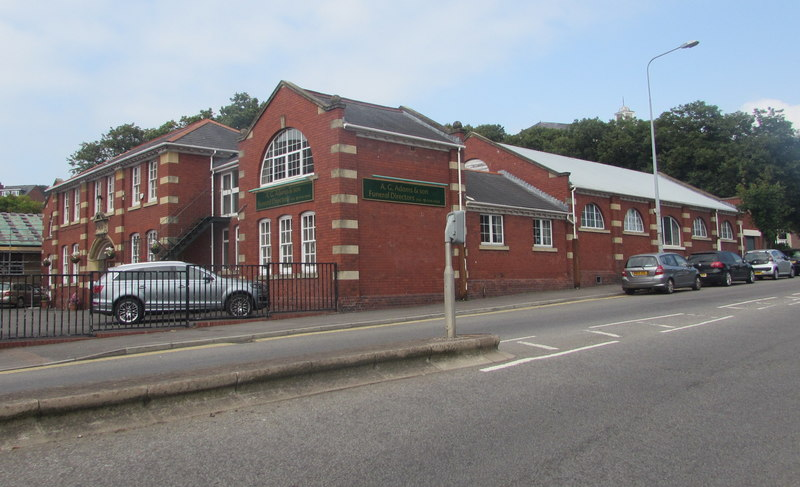
Drill hall, Gladstone Road, Barry. Built for No 5 Company in 1914

By October 1914, the campaign on the Western Front was bogging down into Trench warfare and there was an urgent need for batteries of siege artillery to be sent to France. The WO decided that the TF coastal gunners were well enough trained to take over many of the duties in the coastal defences, releasing Regular RGA gunners for service in the field, and 1st line RGA companies that had volunteered for overseas service had been authorised to increase their strength by 50 per cent. Although complete defended ports units never went overseas, they did supply trained gunners to RGA units serving overseas. They also provided cadres to form new units for front line service, and the Glamorgan RGA is known to have raised at least five siege batteries in this way: 96th, 121st, 172nd, 359th and 402nd.

Under Army Council Instruction 686 of April 1917, the coastal defence companies of the RGA (TF) were reorganised. By this stage of the war, the Glamorgan RGA serving in the Swansea and Severn Defences of Western Command consisted of just three companies, the rest having formed batteries for overseas service. These companies were given a slightly higher establishment (five officers and 100 other ranks) and renumbered, abolishing the 1st and 2nd Line distinction:

- 1/2 Company became No 1 Company
- 1/3 Company became No 2 Company
- 2/2 Company became No 3 Company

In April 1918 the Cardiff/Barry Garrison manned guns as follows:

- Nells Point, Barry Battery – 2 x 6-inch Mk VII guns
- Penarth Head, Cardiff Battery – 2 x 6-inch Mk VII guns

The Swansea Garrison manned:

- Mumbles Island Battery – 2 x 4.7-inch QF

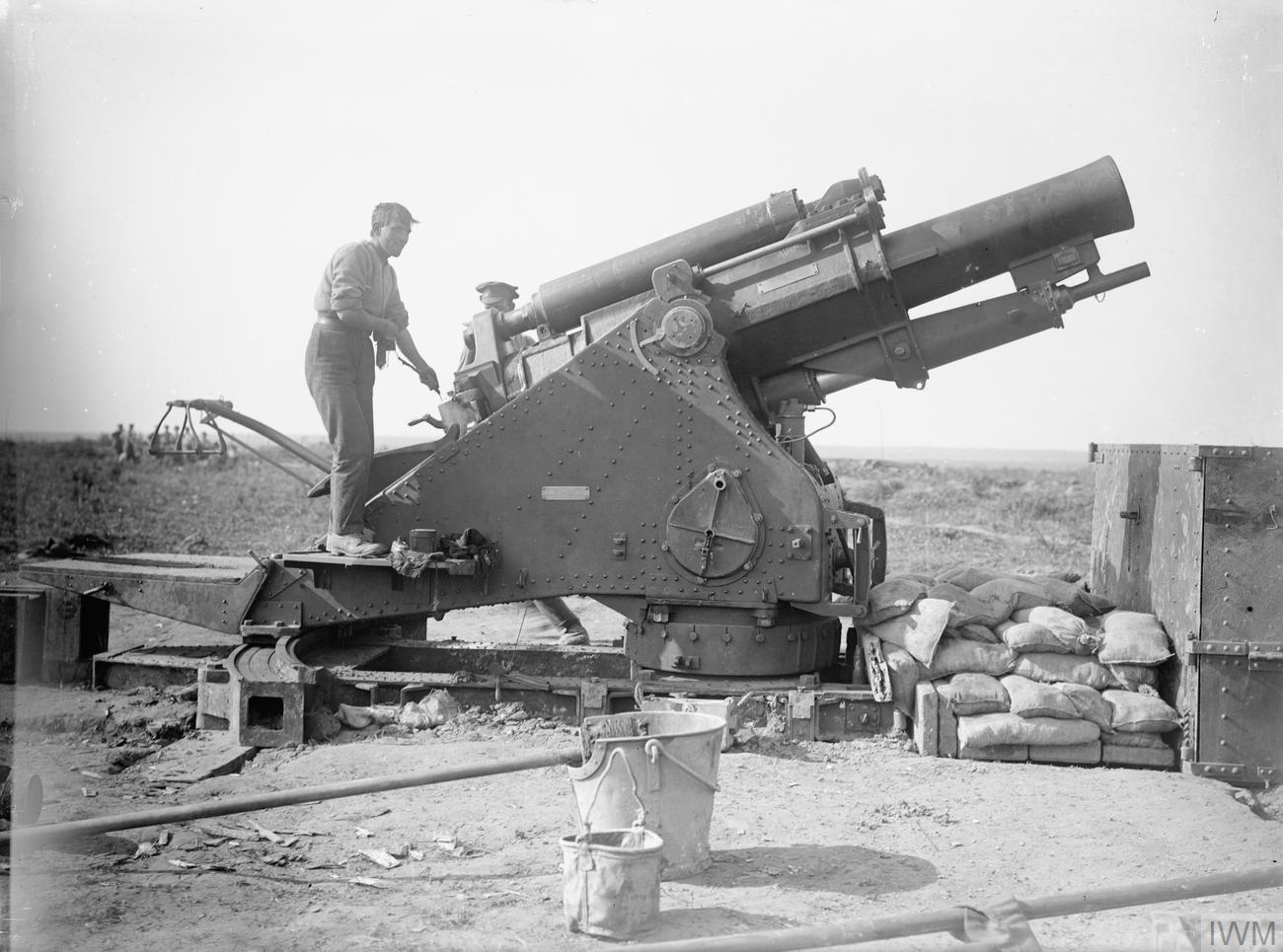
9.2-inch howitzer in action on the Somme, 1916.

=== 96th Siege Battery, RGA ===
According to WO Instruction No 181 of 16 December 1915, 96th Siege Battery was to be formed at Pembroke Dock by three officers and 78 other ranks (the establishment of a full company) drawn from the Glamorgan RGA. The battery actually formed on 1 January 1916 with three officers and 90 men from the Glamorgan RGA and 64 recruits from the Pembroke Dock RGA establishment, under the command of Major C.H.M. Sturgis. It went out to the Western Front on 21 May 1916 and joined 19th Heavy Artillery Group in Third Army on 25 May, taking over four 9.2-inch howitzers in existing emplacements near Pommier from 62nd Siege Bty.

96th Siege Battery saw its first action preparing for the Attack on the Gommecourt Salient in the Battle of the Somme. As the final bombardment began on Z Day (1 July), the battery fired with such intensity that the oil in the guns' hydraulic recoil buffers boiled. However, the Gommecourt attack was a disaster.

Later the battery served with First Army at Arras and with Fifth Army in the latter stages of the Battle of Passchendaele, where the British artillery suffered badly from counter-battery fire, while their own guns sank into the mud and became difficult to aim and fire. It then served through the defensive battles of the German spring offensive followed by the victorious Hundred Days Offensive.

96th Siege Battery was disbanded in 1919.

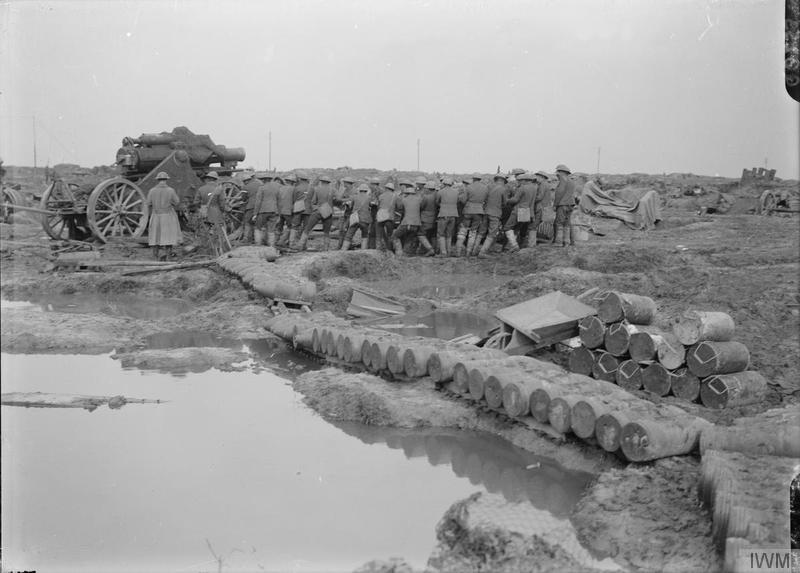
Positioning a 9.2-inch howitzer and its ammunition in the mud of the Ypres Salient, 1917.

=== 121st Siege Battery, RGA ===
121st Siege Battery, RGA, was raised at Pembroke Dock on 22 March 1916 under Army Council Instruction 701 of 31 March 1916 with 3 officers and 78 other ranks from the Glamorgan RGA. It went out to the Western Front in July 1916, manning four 9.2-inch howitzers, and joined I ANZAC Corps in Fifth Army on 15 July in time for the Battle of Pozières. It was later engaged at Arras and Passchendaele.

121st Siege Bty was joined by a section from 428th Siege Bty and expanded to six 9.2-inch howitzers by the end of 1917. The battery was caught up in the 'Great Retreat' of March 1918, but returned during the Hundred Days campaign, including supporting the assault crossing of the St Quentin Canal on 29 September and participating in the crushing artillery barrages of the victorious Hundred Days offensive.

121st Siege Battery was disbanded in 1919.

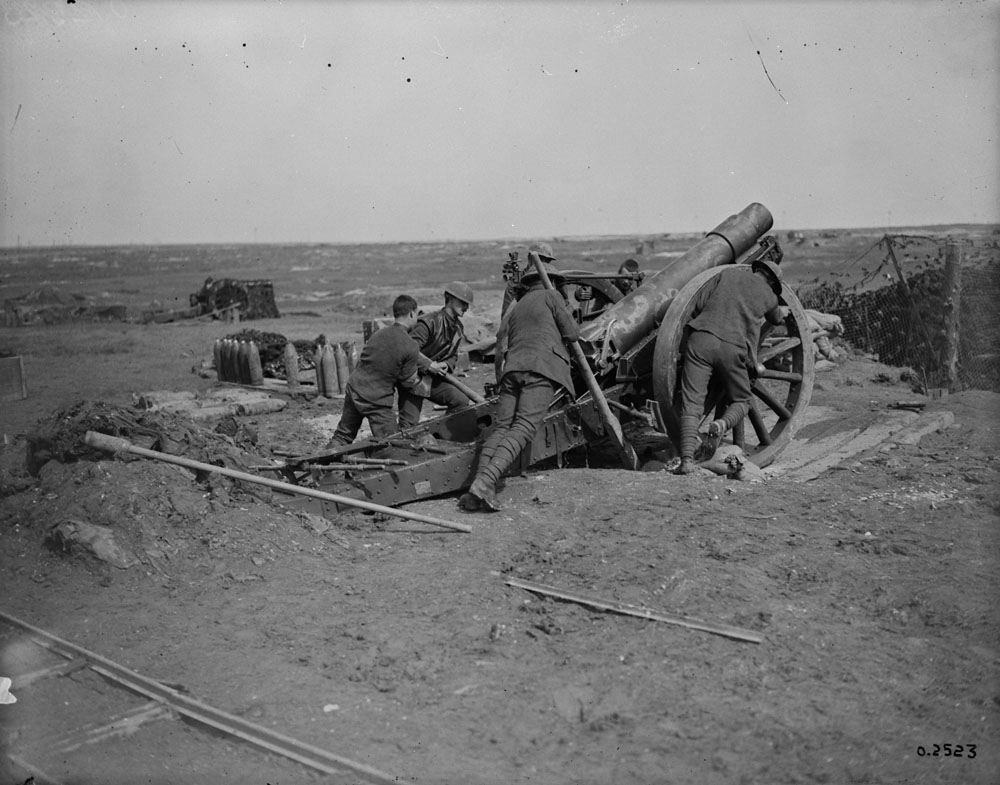
Crew positioning a 6-inch 26 cwt howitzer in 1918.

=== 172nd Siege Battery, RGA ===
172nd Siege Battery, RGA, was raised at Cardiff with three officers and 78 other ranks from the Glamorgan RGA under Army Council Instruction 1239 of 21 June 1916. It went out to the Western Front on 12 September 1916 equipped with four 6-inch 26 cwt Howitzers. It was engaged in the preparation for the Arras Offensive and at Passchendaele. 172nd Siege Bty was joined by a section from 415th Siege Bty on 26 August 1917, and brought up to a strength of six 6-inch howitzers.

In November 1917 the battery was part of the reinforcements sent to the Italian Front after the disastrous Battle of Caporetto. It went into action supporting the Italian army holding the line of the River Piave and in June 1918 supported the defences during the Second Battle of the Piave River.

The British guns participated in the final battle on the Italian Front, the stunning success of the Battle of Vittorio Veneto on 23 October. By 1 November the Austrian army had collapsed and the pursuing British troops had left their heavy guns far in the rear.

172nd Battery was disbanded by the end of March 1919.

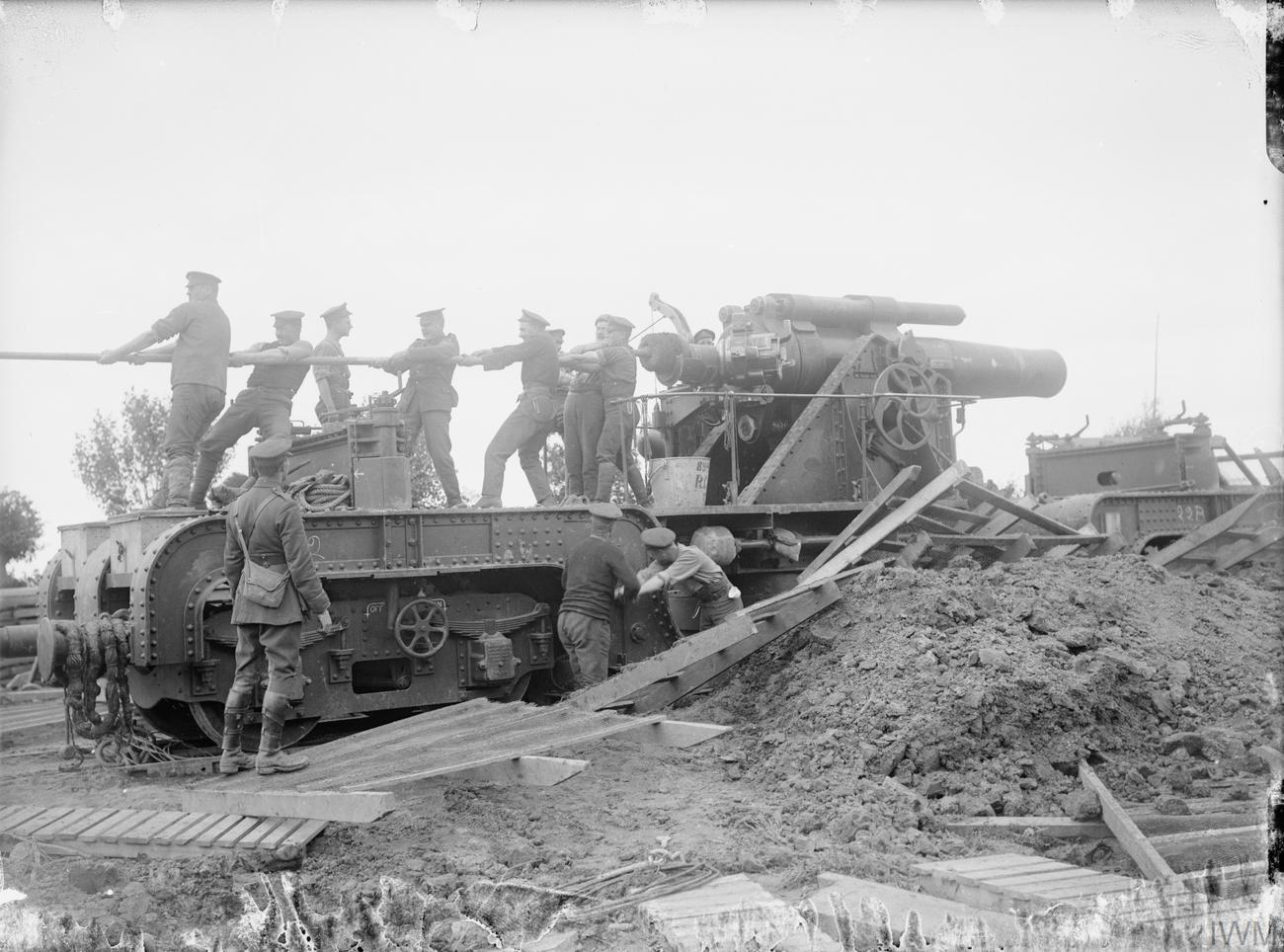
Loading a 12-inch railway howitzer on the Western Front.

=== 359th Siege Battery, RGA ===
359th Siege Battery formed at Lavernock Battery near Cardiff on 21 January 1917. It trained as a BL 12-inch railway howitzer battery and went out to the Western Front on 10 June 1917, joining 19th HAG with XV Corps on the Flanders coast. 10th HAG transferred to Fourth Army HQ on 1 August. The battery joined 76th HAG with Second Army in the Ypres Salient on 21 September, while Second Army was fighting the last stages of the Battle of Passchendaele. On 14 November the battery transferred to 80th HAG, but that headquarters was sent to the Italian Front, so the battery came under the command of other HAGs until January 1918, when it became 'Army Troops' and was no longer attached to a HAG.

Railway construction lagged during the rapid advances of the Hundred Days Offensive and the battery was left behind in the Salient. It was still serving with Second Army when the Armistice came into force in November 1918.

359th Siege Battery was disbanded in 1919.

=== 402nd Siege Battery, RGA ===
402nd Siege Battery, RGA, was raised at Lavernock on 17 March 1917 from a nucleus provided by details of the Glamorganshire RGA. It went out to the Western Front on 30 July and joined First Army in August. The battery was then broken up, one section going to reinforce 17th Siege Bty, the other to 68th Siege Bty (itself formed by the Pembroke RGA).

== Interwar ==
After the TF was demobilised in 1919 the Glamorgan RGA was placed in suspended animation. It was reformed from Nos 1–3 Companies at Cardiff in 1920, with one battery. When the TF was reconstituted as the Territorial Army (TA) in 1921, the unit was designated as the Glamorgan Coast Brigade, RGA. It consisted of HQ and 181 Heavy Battery at the Drill Hall, Cardiff, in 53rd (Welsh) Divisional Area. In 1924 the RGA was subsumed into the RA. In 1926 it was decided that the coast defences of the UK would be manned by the TA alone. The unit was responsible for manning the two 6-inch guns at Lavernock Battery near Cardiff, and the two 4.7-inch guns at Mumbles Battery, near Swansea.

A 1927 report on coastal defences by the Committee of Imperial Defence made recommendations for the defence of 15 home ports, and another eight schemes were added in 1929, including Swansea, Barry, Cardiff and Newport, but little was done to modernise them.

On 1 November 1938 the coast brigades were redesignated as heavy regiments, hence the unit at Cardiff became the Glamorgan Heavy Regiment, RA.

== World War II ==
=== Mobilisation ===
The regiment mobilised in Western Command on the outbreak of war in September 1939 with the single 181 Battery under command. Cardiff and Barry were designated Class A defended ports, with guns installed in peacetime, though the defence schemes of both were still being prepared. On 12 April 1940 plans were made for 6-inch guns to be installed at Swansea.

When the Battle of France turned against the Allies in May 1940, the Admiralty made a number of 6-inch guns available to the army for coastal defence, and when the whole of the UK was put on invasion alert after the Dunkirk evacuation a massive programme of coastal defences was initiated. Although this mainly involved the likely invasion areas of South and South-East England, an emergency battery of two BL 6-inch Mk XII naval guns was authorised on 12 June for Penarth, and two more of two BL 4-inch Mk VII naval guns each were authorised for Llanelli and Port Talbot on 21 July and completed by 24 August. These guns were moved around as required: as of November 1940, Cardiff and Barry had four 6-inch guns, Swansea had two 6-inch and two 4.7-inch, and Llanelli had one 4-inch. Although designated a major port, Newport still had no guns.

On 5 September 1940 the coastal artillery was reorganised, and the regiment became 531st (Glamorgan) Coast Regiment, with 181 Bty expanded to A and B Btys. In addition, 21st Coast Artillery Group (later 559th Special Coast Regiment) was formed on 18 October 1940 at Mumbles, with 401 and 402 Btys, joined on 22 October by B Bty from 531st Coast Rgt.

Britain's coastal defences reached their height in September 1941, by which time Cardiff, Swansea and Barry (all defined as major ports) each had two 6-inch guns, and Barry had two 4.7-inch in addition. Newport still only had two 12-pounders, as did Llanelli. Port Talbot had a defence battery of two 4-inch guns.

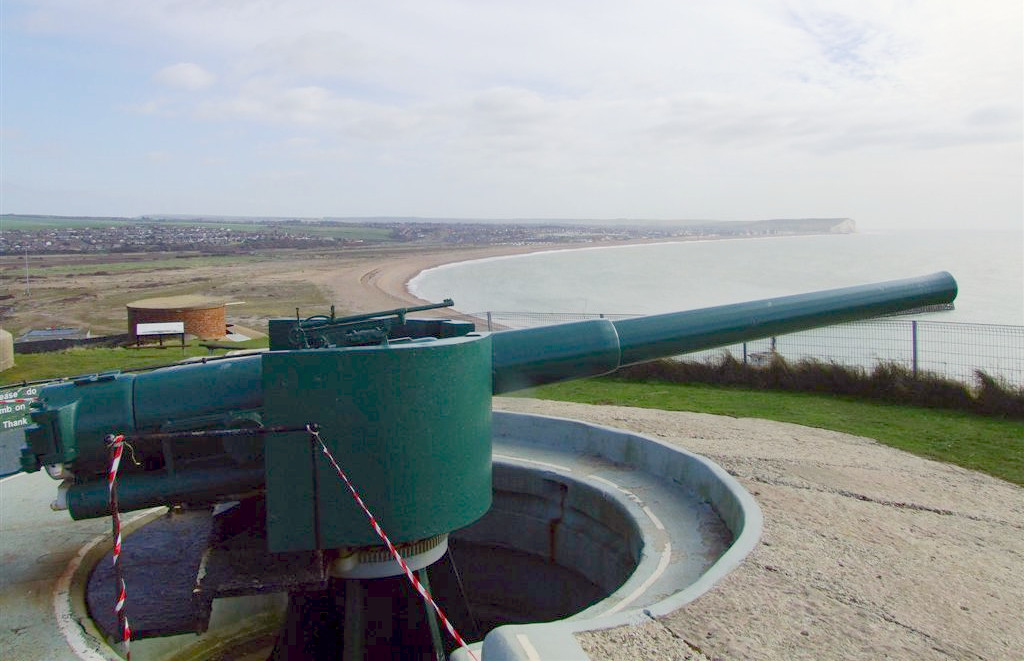
BL 6-inch Mk VII naval gun in typical coast defence mounting (this example is preserved at Newhaven Fort).

At this stage of the war, the coast defences in Glamorgan were as follows:

- 531st (Glamorgan) Coast Regiment
  - HQ at Cardiff
  - A Bty – redesignated 130 Bty 1 April 1941
  - 365 Bty at Portishead – joined 31 December 1940
  - 366 Bty at Steep Holm South – joined 31 December 1940
  - 192 Bty – formed 27 March 1941
  - 145 Independent Bty – joined 1 July 1941
  - 170 Bty – joined from Home Forces 16 July 1941; to 560th Coast Rgt 10 August 1940
  - 188 Bty – joined from Home Forces 11 August 1941
  - 189 Bty – joined from 524th (Lancashire and Cheshire) Coast Rgt 10 October 1941
  - 427 Bty – twin 6-pounder QF battery formed at Lydstep Haven, Tenby, 14 August and attached; to Cardiff and regimented 7 November 1941
  - 430 Bty – twin 6-pounder QF battery formed at 73rd Coast Training Rgt, Lydstep, 11 September; to Cardiff and joined 7 November 1941

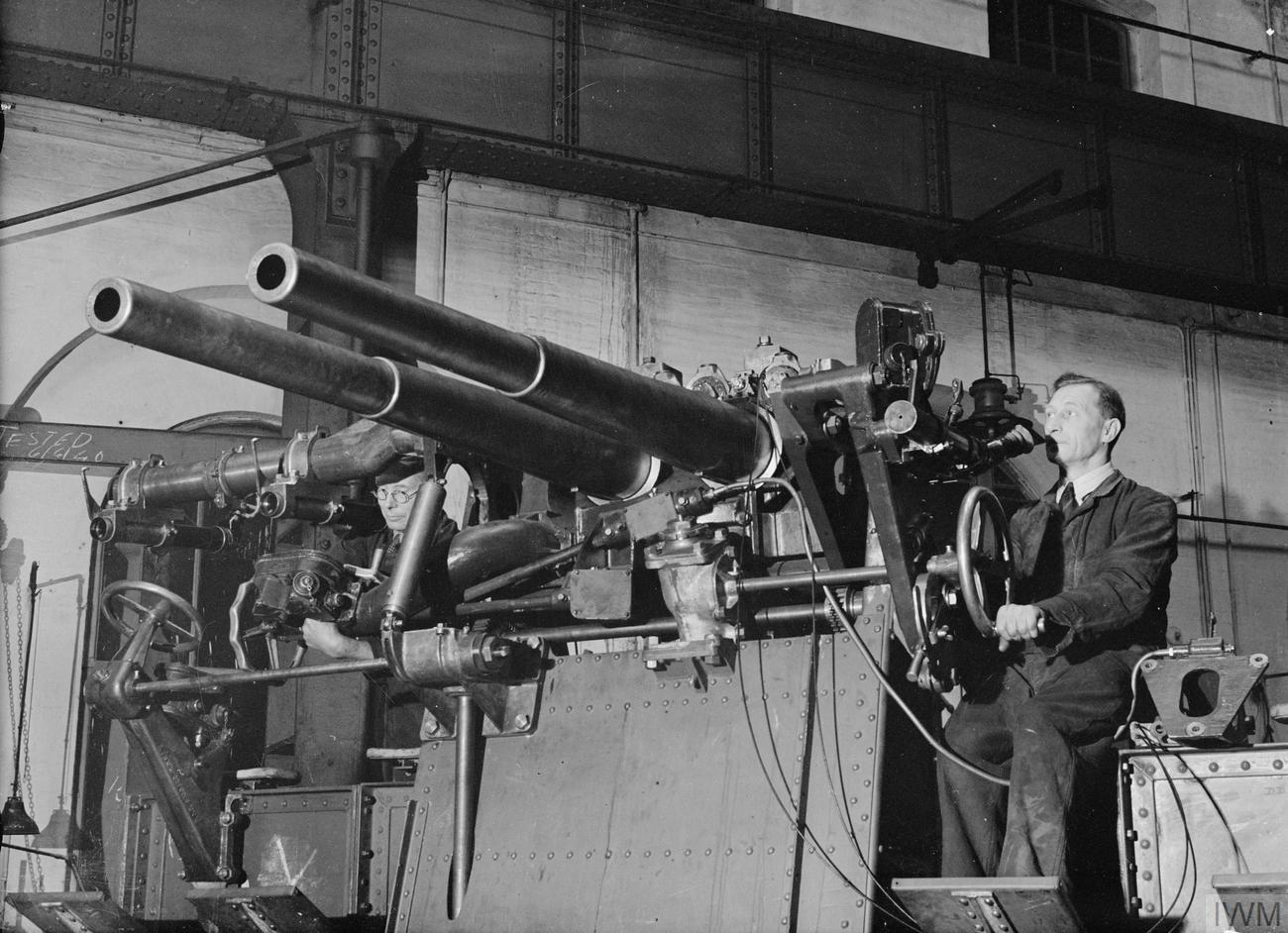
6-pounder QF Mk I in twin coastal artillery mount.

- 559th Special Coast Regiment – redesignated from 21st CA Group 1 June 1941
  - HQ at Mumbles
  - 401 Bty at Port Talbot
  - 402 Bty at Llanelli
  - 298 Bty at Mumbles Hill – redesignated from B/531 Bty joined 22 October 1940
  - 166 Bty at Mumbles Rock – formed 27 March 1941; to 533rd (Orkney) Coast Rgt 3 June 1941
  - 146 Bty – joined from 535th (Orkney) Coast Rgt 28 May 1941
  - 32 and 33 Coast Observer Detachments – joined by December 1941

=== Mid-War ===
At the end of 1941 the defences of the Severn Estuary were completely reorganised: Cardiff Fire Command was reorganised into three separate fire commands, with 531st Rgt in Docks FC. 531st Rgt lost four of its batteries to two new coast regiments, 570th and 571st, formed from Flat Holm and Brean Down Fire Control respectively, while 192 Bty was disbanded. This gave the following organisation:

- 531st (Glamorgan) Coast Regiment
  - HQ Cardiff
  - 130 Bty – became independent 14 October 1942 (passed into suspended animation 1 June 1945)
  - 170 Independent Bty – returned from 560th Coast Rgt 14 October 1942
  - 187 Bty – from 537th Coast Rgt 10 July 1942
  - 427 Bty – left for 514th Coast Rgt 30 June 1942
  - 430 Bty
- 559th Coast Regiment
  - HQ Mumbles
  - 146 Bty – to 570th Coast Rgt 7 December 1942
  - 298 Bty – left for 562nd Coast Rgt 2 May 1942
  - 299 Bty – joined from 562nd Coast Rgt 2 May 1942
  - 401 Bty – left for 561st Coast Rgt 1 November 1942
  - 402 Bty – left for 554th Coast Rgt 26 May 1942
  - 422 Bty – joined from 561st Coast Rgt 1 November 1942
  - 431 Bty – twin 6-pounder QF battery formed at 73rd Coast Training Rgt, Lydstep, 11 September; to Swansea and joined 15 December 1941
  - 32 Coast Observer Detachment – left for 532nd (Pembroke) Coast Rgt by December 1942
  - 33 Coast Observer Detachment
  - 36 (Mobile) Defence Troop, RA – joined January 1942, disbanded May 1942
- 570th Coast Regiment
  - HQ Flat Holm, moved to Barry 7 December 1942
  - 145 Bty – from 531st Coast Rgt 19 December 1941
  - 188, 189 Btys – from 531st Coast Rgt 19 December 1941
- 571st Coast Regiment
  - HQ Brean Down
  - 365, 366 Btys – from 531st Coast Rgt 19 December 1941

531st, 570th and 571st Coast Rgts were under HQ Severn Defences, while 559th, further west at the Mumbles, was directly under Western Command until it joined Severn Defences in 1942.

=== Late War ===
By 1942 the threat from German attack had diminished and there was demand for trained gunners for the fighting fronts. A process of reducing the manpower in the coast defences began. 531st (Glamorgan) Coast Rgt was stood down (Note: As an established TA unit it could not be simply disbanded, and was probably placed in 'suspended animation' at this time, although it was never reformed.) 7 December 1942, completing on 31 December. Its three remaining batteries assigned to 570th Coast Rgt, which together with other reassignments gave Severn Defences the following organisation in 1943:

- 559th Coast Rgt
  - 299, 422, 431 Btys
  - 24 Coast Observer Detachment – joined by July 1943
  - 33 Coast Observer Detachment
- 570th Coast Rgt
  - 145, 146, 170, 187, 430 Btys
  - 205 Bty – from 537th Coast Rgt 7 December 1942
  - 1, 2 Coast Observer Detachments – disbanded by May 1943
  - 105 Coast Observer Detachment – joined by December 1942
  - 106 Coast Observer Detachment – joined by December 1942, to 532nd Coast Rgt by July 1943, returned by November 1943
- 571st Coast Rgt
  - 184, 188, 189, 366 Btys
  - 78 Coast Observer Detachment – joined by November 1943

=== Disbandment ===
The manpower requirements for the forthcoming Allied invasion of Normandy (Operation Overlord) led to further reductions in coast defences in April 1944: 559th and 571st Coast Rgts were disbanded and 570th had all their batteries assigned to it, 24 and 33 Coast Observer Detachments replacing 105 and 106, though they also left in July. By this stage of the war many of the coast battery positions were manned by Home Guard detachments or in the hands of care and maintenance parties. The separate HQ for Severn Fixed Defences was also disbanded, and the regiment came directly under Western Command. 570th Coast Rgt itself was disbanded at Barry on 1 June 1945, shortly after VE Day, together with 170, 184, 187, 189, 205, 366, 422, 430 and 431 Btys; the remaining TA batteries (145, 146 and 299) went into suspended animation.

== Postwar ==
When the TA was reformed in 1947, 531st (Glamorgan) Coast Regiment was formally disbanded, and the 664th (Welsh) Coast Regiment was formed as a new unit at Cardiff, though it is unclear why it was not considered as a successor to 531st Coast Rgt. In 1950 the 'Welsh' subtitle was changed to 'Glamorgan'. However, it was soon afterwards decided to reduce the number of TA coast regiments, and in 1953 the regiment was amalgamated with 425th (Pembroke) Coast Rgt to form 408th Coast Rgt based at the Defensible Barracks, Pembroke Dock, with R and S Btys provided by the 664th. The new regiment took the subtitle 'Glamorganshire and Monmouthshire' in 1954, but the Coast Artillery Branch of the RA was disbanded on 31 December 1956. The Glamorgan batteries were amalgamated into 281st (Glamorgan Yeomanry) Field Regiment while the Pembroke batteries were amalgamated into 302nd (Pembroke Yeomanry) Field Regiment.

== Honorary Colonels ==
The following served as Honorary Colonel of the unit:

- Lt-Col Robert Windsor-Clive, 1st Earl of Plymouth, appointed 1 November 1890
- Captain Ivor Windsor-Clive, 2nd Earl of Plymouth, appointed 12 March 1924

== Memorial ==
There is a stone tablet in St John the Baptist Church, Cardiff, as a memorial to the 69 men of the Glamorgan RGA who died during World War I.
