= 105th Siege Battery, Royal Garrison Artillery =

105th Siege Battery, RGA
- Cap Badge of the Royal Regiment of Artillery
- Active: 13 January 1916–30 March 1919
- Country: United Kingdom
- Branch: British Army
- Role: Siege Artillery
- Part of: Royal Garrison Artillery
- Engagements: Battle of the Somme; Battle of Arras; Battle of Passchendaele; Second Battle of the Piave River; Battle of Vittorio Veneto

105th Siege Battery was a unit of Britain's Royal Garrison Artillery formed during World War I. It served on both the Western Front, including the Battles of the Somme, Arras and Passchendaele, and the Italian Front, where it participated in the repulse of the Austrian Summer Offensive of 1918 and the crushing victory at Vittorio Veneto.

== Mobilisation and training ==
105th Siege Battery was formed at Fort Burgoyne, Dover, on 13 January 1916 under Army Council Instruction 145 of 19 January 1916 with the establishment for a battery of towed 12-inch Mark II Vickers Howitzers. Major C.E. Eady was in command. The battery was sent by rail to Horsham, and then to the artillery ranges at Lydd for training. Among the officers appointed to the battery was the artist and illustrator E. H. Shepard, commissioned as a Second lieutenant.

== Western Front ==
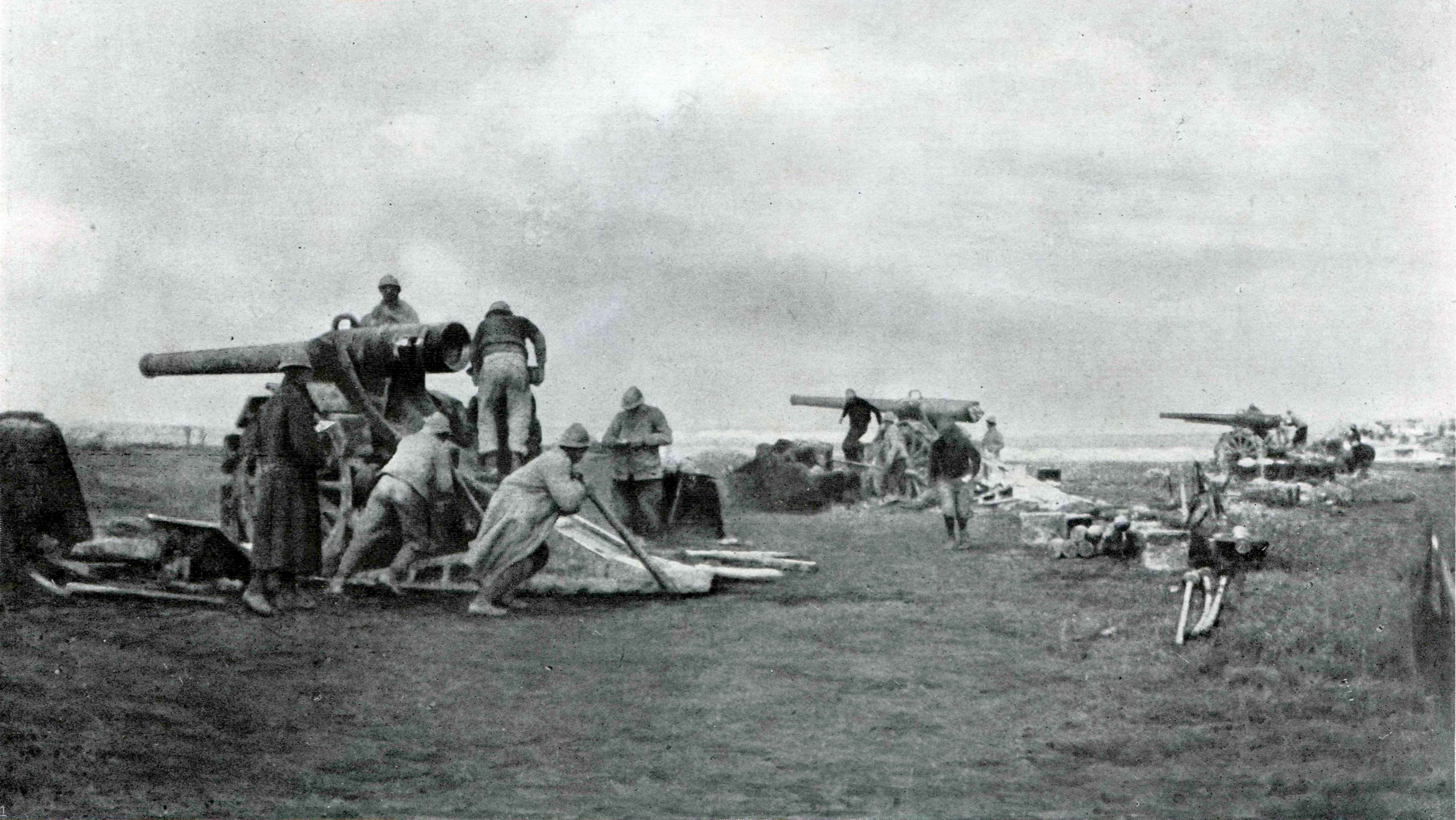
A battery of French 120 mm guns in action.

On 18 April the unit was ordered to change to the establishment for a battery of 8-inch howitzers. (Note: None of the new 12-inch howitzers were ready for service before August 1916.) The battery proceeded to France on 17 May under the command of Captain P.B. Simon. The men travelled with complete stores but without guns. On arrival they were sent to Le Parcq near Hesdin where they were issued with four French 120 mm long guns, which were hated by the inexperienced gunners trained on howitzers. (Note: E.H. Shepard drew one of these 120 mm guns and referred to the men's hatred of them in a letter dated 13 July.)

The battery was under the command of XVII Corps' Heavy Artillery in Third Army and was assigned to 50th Heavy Artillery Group (HAG). After the officers and gun No 1s had undergone a short course on the unfamiliar 120mm, the battery first went into action on 10 June in front of Mont-Saint-Éloi near Arras, firing on enemy trenches at Vimy, where there had recently been heavy fighting. Captain Simon was invalided home on 29 June and Captain D'Arcy J. Richards, the battery captain, took over command as acting major.

=== Somme ===
On 3 July the battery was transferred south to Fourth Army, which had just launched the Battle of the Somme. It joined 29th HAG the following day and spent 6 July digging in at Bronfay Farm, where the HAG's HQ was located. For the next 10 days it was firing on Owzentin, Trônes and Longueval during the Battle of Bazentin Ridge and the Capture of Trônes Wood in support of XIII Corps. On 16 July the battery moved forward to Maricourt Orchard, but had to be withdrawn following heavy casualties from High explosive (HE) and gas shells. Shortly afterwards the signals officer, 2nd Lt M.G. Herbert, and Corporal Dell won the Military Cross (MC) and Distinguished Conduct Medal (DCM) respectively for their bravery in tackling a fire among live hand grenades at Maricourt Chateau.

On 23 July the battery moved to a fresh position behind 'Copse B' (Aromme Avenue), which had just been captured. Here it remained until September, although it was transferred to the command of 57th HAG on 14 August when XIV Corps took over that section of the front during the fighting for Delville Wood. The battery was relieved on 18 September and was issued with four modern British 6-inch howitzers. It moved up to positions near Guillemont and joined 28th HAG, with which it saw out the fighting on the Somme until November, including bombardments of the German third line at Morval, Lesbœufs and Le Transloy.

The battery moved forward to a position by Leuze Wood on 10 December and came under the direct command of Guards Division around Sailly-Saillisel and St Pierre Vaast Wood. It stayed in this position through the winter. On 19 February 1917 A/Maj Richards won an MC for maintaining communications during a trench raid conducted by the neighbouring French troops.

=== Arras ===
After the German retirement to the Hindenburg Line (Operation Alberich), 105th Siege Bty was transferred to 73rd HAG in Third Army on 22 March in preparation for the forthcoming Arras Offensive. Right Section moved first, taking up position at Chat Maigre; Left Section joined a fortnight later. Despite the protection of the embankment of the Arras–Bapaume railway, the gun positions were very exposed and gun flashes from German-held Monchy-le-Preux were clearly visible. The battery had been carrying out daily bombardments on the Hindenburg Line in preparation for the attack when on 5 April a lorry delivering ammunition was hit by a German shell and left burning a few yards from No 4 gun. Major Richards called for volunteers and together with Lieutenant R.J.H. Hambly kept the gun firing until the lorry blew up a few minutes later, causing a dump of 200 HE shells to explode. The gun detachment was knocked down and the gun put out of action. Despite being badly shaken, Richards continued to direct the fire of the rest of the battery until the bombardment task was completed. Major Richards was awarded a Distinguished Service Order (DSO), Lt Hambly an MC, Cpls Wady and Evans DCMs, and Sergeants Griffiths and Black Military Medals (MM).

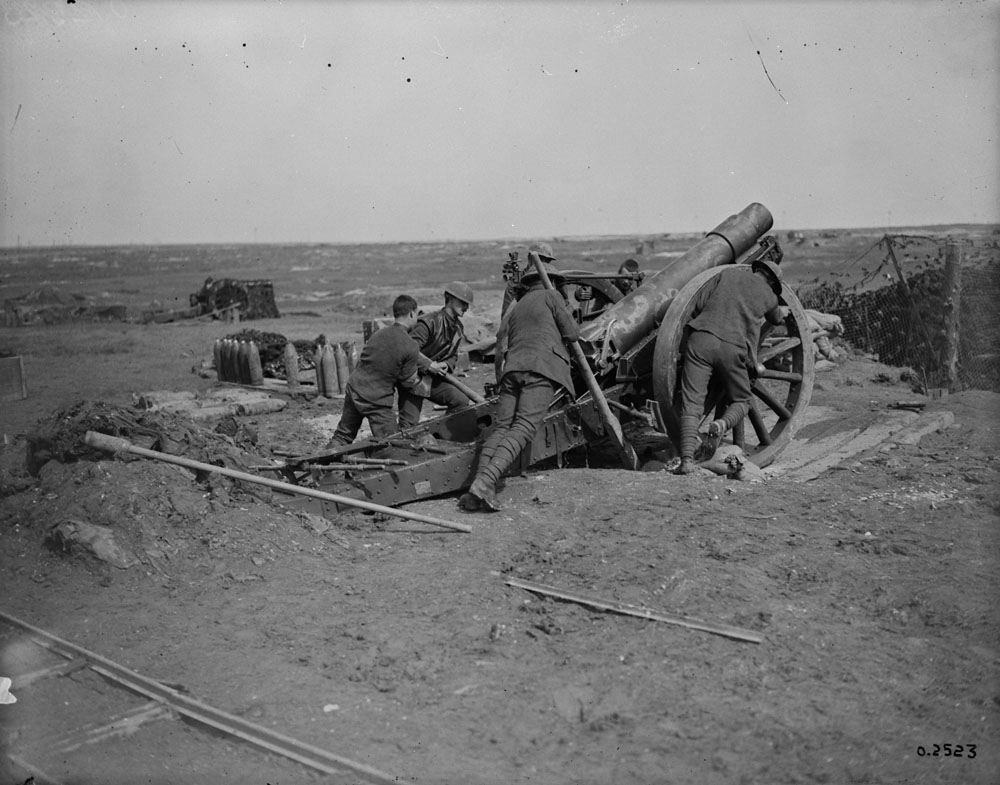
Crew positioning a 6-inch 26 cwt howitzer.

The Battle of Arras was launched on 9 April 1917 and the battery moved forward to Mercatel later that day. On the morning of 23 April, while the fighting near Arras continued, the battery was heavily shelled and Maj Richards and a number of others were seriously wounded. 2nd Lieutenant Shepard found himself in temporary command on the battery position. That evening he went back into the front line at the battery's observation post (OP) under heavy shell and machine gun fire. He was awarded the MC and promoted to A/Captain for that night's work. Captain L.F. Garratt was posted in to command the battery on 5 May. The battery moved to Hénin-sur-Cojeul on 9 May, and subsequently into the captured Hindenburg Support Line at Fontaine-lès-Croisilles.

105th Siege Bty remained with Third Army until the Arras offensive petered out in June, coming under the command of 46th HAG on 13 May, 39th HAG on 28 June and 59th HAG on 29 June. On 9 July it was transferred north to 67th HAG with First Army, arriving on 13 July. The sections were split between Cambrin and Vermelles in the Lens sector.

On 4 September the battery collected two extra howitzers, and on 22 September it was joined by a section from the newly-arrived 440th Siege Bty, bringing its personnel up to the establishment numbers for a six-gun battery. (Note: 440th Siege Battery, RGA, was formed on 22 May 1917 at Aldershot. The personnel of one section went out to the Western Front on 23 September 1917 and joined First Army. It was then posted to 105th Siege Bty. The rest of 440th Siege Bty went via France and Italy to Alexandria, where it joined the Egyptian Expeditionary Force.) The men were moved to St Pierre-Lens where they were engaged in digging gun-pits at St Pierre-Lens in October for an operation that was cancelled. (Note: Shepard drew the men digging these positions on 19 October 'for the show that didn't'.)

=== Ypres ===
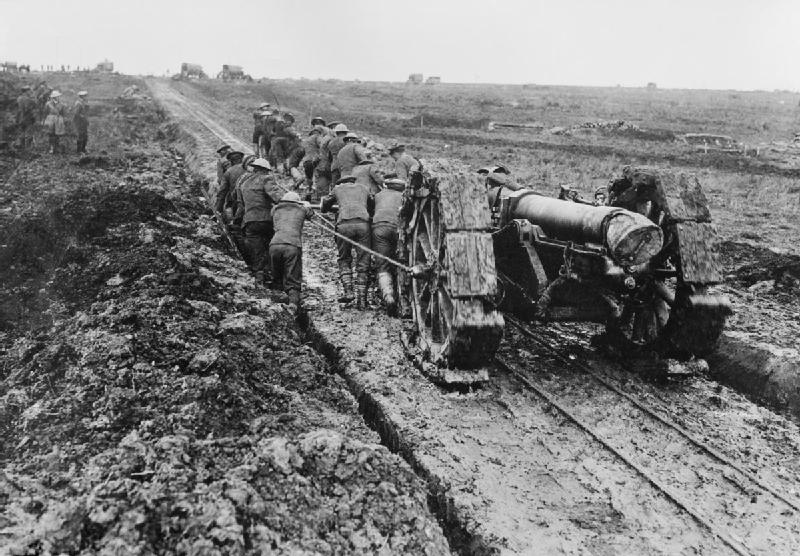
6-inch howitzer being moved through mud on the Western Front.

The battery moved to the Ypres Salient on 29 October to join 6th HAG with VIII Corps. This was part of Second Army, which had taken over direction of the faltering Third Ypres Offensive and fought a series of successful battles employing massive weight of artillery. But as the offensive continued with the Battle of Poelcappelle and First and Second Battles of Passchendaele, the tables were turned: British batteries were clearly observable from the Passchendaele Ridge and were subjected to counter-battery (CB) fire, while their own guns sank into the mud and became difficult to move and fire. 105th Siege Bty came into action near Zillebeke. On 9 November the camouflage netting of No 1 gun caught fire, which was extinguished under enemy fire by Sgt Walton (who was awarded the MM). The following day (the last day of the battle), while carrying out barrage fire, No 2 gun blew up, killing or wounding the whole detachment. Next day after the battery reverted to a four-gun establishment and on 12 November it joined 24th HAG.

== Italian Front ==
The battery was expecting some home leave after the Ypres Offensive, but following the disastrous Battle of Caporetto on the Italian Front, Second Army HQ and several of its sub-formations were sent to reinforce the Italian Army. 24th HAG left with XIV Corps on 17 November 1917, travelling via Paris, Marseille and Genoa, arriving at Verona on 25 November. By 6 December its guns went into action on the Montello Hill, supporting the Italian army, which had been critically short of heavy artillery. The situation was stabilised by the end of the year, but XIV Corps and 24th HAG remained in Italy.

Apart from some CB shoots, there was little activity through the winter months. In February 1918 the HAGs became permanent RGA brigades: 24th Bde consisted of one heavy battery (1/1st Warwickshire Bty) and three other 6-inch howitzer siege batteries (172nd, 229th and 247th) in addition to the 105th.

=== Piave ===
At the end of March 1918, 105th Siege Bty moved to a position south of the Asiago plateau supporting VIII Italian Corps. The gunsites were in wooded mountainous terrain and the guns had to be manhandled into position. They carried out trench bombardment while awaiting the next Austrian offensive (the Second Battle of the Piave River). This finally came on 15 June. Despite some initial Austrian gains, 48th (South Midland) Division held its main positions. The battery was at Monte Torle and was heavily engaged all day. Gunner Stubbs was awarded the MM and Gnr Taylor the Italian Silver Medal of Military Valor for keeping communications open during the day. The British heavy howitzers systematically destroyed the Austrian guns on the Asiago, notwithstanding poor visibility early on (Royal Air Force observation aircraft were able to direct the fire later) and the Austrian offensive failed all along the front.

=== Vittorio Veneto ===
Preparations then began for the final battle on the Italian Front, the stunning success of the Battle of Vittorio Veneto. The British were relieved in the Asiago sector and moved to join the British-commanded Tenth Italian Army near Treviso. 24th HAG supported a number of British and French raids during September and October, then on 23 October the preliminary attacks began, supported by 24th HAG's howitzers. The main British assault crossed the River Piave on 27 October, with the heavy guns engaging all known Austrian gun positions and providing a protective barrage on either flank. A bridge was ready by 29 October and the heavy guns crossed the river. By 1 November the Austrian army had collapsed and the pursuing British troops had left their heavy guns far in the rear. Austrian signed the Armistice of Villa Giusti on 3 November, ending the war in Italy.

After the Armistice, 24th HAG was involved in securing prisoners. Shepard was promoted to major in command of the battery, and given the duty of administering captured enemy guns. Demobilisation of the batteries in Italy began at Christmas 1918 and by March 105th Siege Bty was down to cadre strength. It handed in its guns and proceeded to Le Havre, where was disbanded on 30 March 1919.
