= 56th (Cornwall) Heavy Anti-Aircraft Regiment, Royal Artillery =

56th (Cornwall) Heavy Anti-Aircraft Regiment
- Cap Badge of the Royal Artillery (pre-1953)
- Active: 1 October 1932–1 July 1955
- Country: United Kingdom
- Branch: Territorial Army
- Role: Air Defence; Medium Artillery
- Size: Regiment
- Garrison/HQ: Falmouth, Cornwall
- Engagements: The Blitz; Iceland; India

56th (Cornwall) Heavy Anti-Aircraft Regiment, Royal Artillery was a volunteer air defence regiment of Britain's Territorial Army (TA). Originally raised in 1920 as a medium artillery regiment, it was converted to the anti-aircraft role in 1932. During the Second World War, it was employed in Home Defence, in Iceland and then in India, where it was temporarily converted back to medium artillery. Postwar, it reverted to air defence until disbandment in 1955.

== Origin ==
With the reorganisation of the Territorial Force (TF) into the new TA in 1920, a new medium artillery unit was formed, under the title 7th (Cornwall and Warwickshire) Medium Brigade, Royal Garrison Artillery, renumbered 51st the following year. It initially had its headquarters at Truro, Cornwall, and comprised three new Cornish batteries based at Padstow, Par and Penzance, and one existing heavy battery from Birmingham, Warwickshire.

== 51st (Cornwall and Warwickshire) Medium Brigade ==
There had been Artillery Volunteer Corps (AVCs) at Padstow and Par since 1859, and at Penzance since 1877, and these had later formed part of the 1st Cornwall (Duke of Cornwall's) Artillery Volunteers. This unit had defended the Cornish ports throughout the World War I, but in the postwar reorganisation it became a Coast Artillery brigade based at Falmouth, and new batteries were raised at Padstow, Par and Penzance for the 51st Medium Brigade.

The other battery had originally been raised in 1908 at Saltley, Birmingham, as the South Midland (Warwickshire) Royal Garrison Artillery, which provided the Heavy battery of the 48th (South Midland) Division of the TF. It had served on the Western Front during World War I.

With minor changes in title over succeeding years, the new unit was organised as follows:

51st (Cornwall and Warwickshire) Medium Brigade, Royal Garrison Artillery

- HQ St Austell
- 201st (Cornwall) Medium Battery, RA, Padstow
- 202nd (Cornwall) Medium Battery, RA (Howitzer), Par
- 203rd (Cornwall) Medium Battery, RA, Penzance
- 204th (Warwickshire) Medium Battery, RA, Saltley

== 56th (Cornwall) Anti-Aircraft Regiment ==
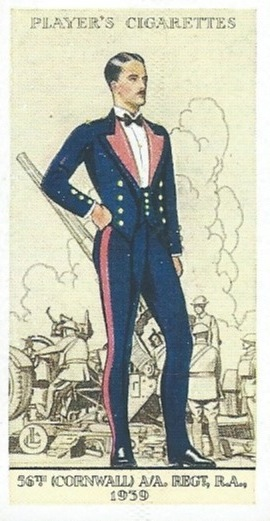
1939 Cigarette Card showing an officer of 56th (Cornwall) AA Regiment, RA, wearing Mess Dress

In 1932, as part of the increase in air defence for the United Kingdom, 51st Medium Brigade was converted into 56th (Cornwall) Anti-Aircraft Brigade. The HQ was at Falmouth and the three Cornish batteries (201, 202 and 203) were converted to the new role. In place of the Birmingham battery, the unit received 165th Battery at Redruth, which had formerly been part of the Cornwall Coast Brigade (former 1st Cornwall (Duke of Cornwall's), see above). The regiment formed part of the Plymouth and Falmouth Defences of Southern Command.

On 1 January 1939, the RA replaced its traditional designation of 'Brigade' by the modern 'Regiment'. Anti-Aircraft Command was formed in April 1939 to command all TA air defences.

=== The Blitz ===
By the outbreak of World War II, 56 AA Regiment was part of 35th Anti-Aircraft Brigade in 5th Anti-Aircraft Division of AA Command.

On 1 June 1940, along with other AA units equipped with the older 3-inch and newer 3.7-inch AA guns, the 56th was designated a Heavy AA Regiment. By then, the regiment had been transferred to the command of 55th Anti-Aircraft Brigade in 8th Anti-Aircraft Division. This brigade provided air defence for the city of Plymouth and its Royal Navy Dockyard during The Blitz.

The regiment provided the cadre for a new 381 HAA Bty formed on 14 November 1940 at 205th HAA Training Rgt, Arborfield, which later joined 120th HAA Rgt. It provided another cadre for 458 (Mixed) HAA Bty formed on 10 July 1941 at 207th HAA Training Rgt, Devizes, which joined 131st (Mixed) HAA Rgt. ('Mixed' units were those in which women of the Auxiliary Territorial Service (ATS) were integrated.)

In May 1941, the regiment joined the War Office Reserve, while still remaining part of 55th AA Bde. This meant that it was being prepared for service overseas. At the same time, 203 Battery was detached.

=== Iceland ===
In July 1941, 203 Battery was sent to Iceland, which had been occupied by British forces ('Alabaster Force') the previous year. The battery came under command of the Regular 12th HAA Regiment and was stationed to protect Royal Navy and Royal Air Force installations. However, the decision to transfer the defence of Iceland to the (still neutral) United States had been taken in July 1941, and the AA positions were taken over by US forces later in the year.

=== India ===
In December 1941, the regiment sailed (with 165, 201 and 202 Batteries) to India, arriving at Madras in March 1942, 202 Bty moving on to Calcutta shortly afterwards to join 53rd (City of London) HAA Rgt.

In 1942, 56 HAA was under command of 13 AA Bde; a year later it was part of 3rd Indian AA Bde, which then exchanged with 9 AA Bde, all in the Bombay and Madras area. It also had 154 (London) Battery from 52 (London) HAA Regiment, which joined on 29 March 1943 to replace 202 HAA Bty. From 24 April to 13 July 1943, 165 HAA Bty was detached under command of 1st Medium Rgt. At the end of March 1944, the regiment arrived in Galunche, where it came under the AA Brigade of XXXIII Indian Corps.

== 86th (Cornwall) Medium Regiment ==
In July 1944, by now under 9 AA Bde at Poona, the regiment underwent a major reorganisation, converting back to the medium artillery role. Initially designated 'B' Medium Regiment, it became 86th (Cornwall) Medium Regiment, Royal Artillery on 15 August, with 165 and 201 Medium Batteries, while 202 Bty, which had just rejoined, provided personnel to 70th (3rd West Lancashire) Battery in 'C' Medium Regiment (later 87 Medium Regiment). The reorganised regiment moved to Secunderabad in September, and then to Ranchi in December, where it joined RA Training HQ No 40. By the end of 1944, the regiment had acquired a section of 7.2-inch howitzers to operate in the medium artillery role, for which it had to find the detachments, command posts and observation post parties.

In mid-July 1945, 86 Medium Regiment came under the command of 59th Army Group Royal Artillery, which was training for Operation Zipper, the planned amphibious attack on the coast of enemy-occupied Malaya. However, the Japanese surrendered and the war ended before this operation could take place as planned.

86th Medium Rgt, with 165 and 201 Med Btys, was placed in suspended animation on 1 May 1946.

== Postwar ==
In 1947, the regiment was reconstituted in the TA as 456 (Cornwall) Heavy Anti-Aircraft Regiment, RA (TA) with its HQ at Redruth and forming part of 81 AA Bde (the old 55 AA Bde based in Plymouth). However, when AA Command was disbanded on 10 March 1955, the regiment was placed in suspended animation, completing the process by 1 July.

== Honorary Colonel ==
The following officers served as Honorary Colonel of the regiment:

- Hon Maj-Gen Sir Francis C. Poole, KBE, CB, CMG. DSO, appointed 19 January 1929
- Lt-Col Sir Edward Bolitho, KBE, CB, DSO, appointed 24 February 1937
