= South Midland (Warwickshire) Royal Garrison Artillery =

South Midland (Warwickshire) RGA 204 (Warwickshire) Battery 95th (Birmingham) HAA Regiment 495th (Birmingham) HAA Regiment
- Cap Badge of the Royal Regiment of Artillery
- Active: 1908–1955
- Country: United Kingdom
- Branch: Territorial Army
- Role: Heavy artillery Medium artillery Heavy anti-aircraft artillery
- Size: Battery, Regiment
- Part of: South Midland Division; 34 (South Midland) AA Brigade; 1 Indian AA Brigade
- Garrison/HQ: Saltley; Sheldon
- Engagements: World War I: Western Front; Italian Front; World War II: Battle of Britain; Coventry Blitz; Defence of Calcutta

The South Midland (Warwickshire) Royal Garrison Artillery was a volunteer artillery unit of Britain's Territorial Force formed in 1908. It served in Home Defence and provided heavy artillery support to the armies on the Western Front and Italian Front in World War I. In the interwar years it became 204 (Warwickshire) Battery serving in various regiments and formations before being expanded into a full regiment. In World War II it served in the heavy anti-aircraft (HAA) role defending its home area of the West Midlands against German air attack (particularly in the notorious Coventry Blitz), and then defended Calcutta against Japanese attacks. It continued in the postwar Territorial Army until 1955.

== Origins ==
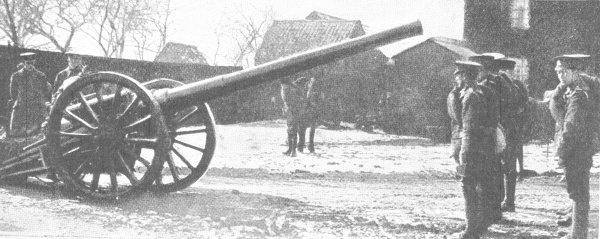
4.7-inch gun on 'Woolwich' carriage, ca 1914

When the Territorial Force (TF) was created in 1908 as part of the Haldane Reforms, each of its infantry divisions included a heavy artillery battery in its establishment. For the South Midland Division a new battery was raised in Birmingham, under the title of South Midland (Warwickshire) Royal Garrison Artillery (RGA). The battery was equipped with four Boer War-era 4.7-inch guns. It was based at the Metropolitan Cammell Carriage and Wagon Company works at Saltley, and was organised as follows:

- HQ at Metropolitan Works, Saltley
- Heavy Battery at Saltley
- Ammunition Column at Wednesbury

== World War I ==
=== Mobilisation ===
The South Midland Division mobilised on the outbreak of World War I and took up its war stations around Chelmsford in Essex as part of Central Force. Shortly afterwards, TF units were invited to volunteer for Overseas Service, and the War Office issued instructions to separate those men who had signed up for Home Service only, and form these into reserve units. On 31 August, the formation of a reserve or 2nd Line unit was authorised for each 1st Line unit where 60 per cent or more of the men had volunteered for Overseas Service. The titles of these 2nd Line units would be the same as the original, but distinguished by a '2/' prefix. Hence the South Midland RGA formed 1/1st South Midland (Warwickshire) Heavy Battery) for overseas service (usually referred to as 1/1st Warwickshire Heavy Battery in army documents) and the 2/1st South Midland (Warwickshire) Heavy Battery for Home Defence and to provide drafts to the 1st Line.

=== 1/1st Warwickshire Heavy Battery ===
==== Western Front ====
The South Midland Division was ordered to join the British Expeditionary Force (BEF) in France on 13 March 1915, and the artillery embarked at Southampton for Le Havre, the 1/1st Battery disembarking on 31 March. By 4 April the division had taken over a section of the front line near Cassel.

However, artillery policy in the BEF was to withdraw heavy batteries from the divisions and group them into dedicated heavy artillery brigades, so on 16 April the battery left the South Midland Division to join Second Army Artillery in time for the Second Battle of Ypres. At this time the practice was to move batteries between heavy brigades (later heavy artillery groups or HAGs) as required, so the 1/1st Warwickshire Bty moved to XVI Brigade RGA on 10 June, to VIII Brigade RGA on 3 July, to III Corps Artillery with First Army on 21 August, and IV Heavy Bde on 10 November.

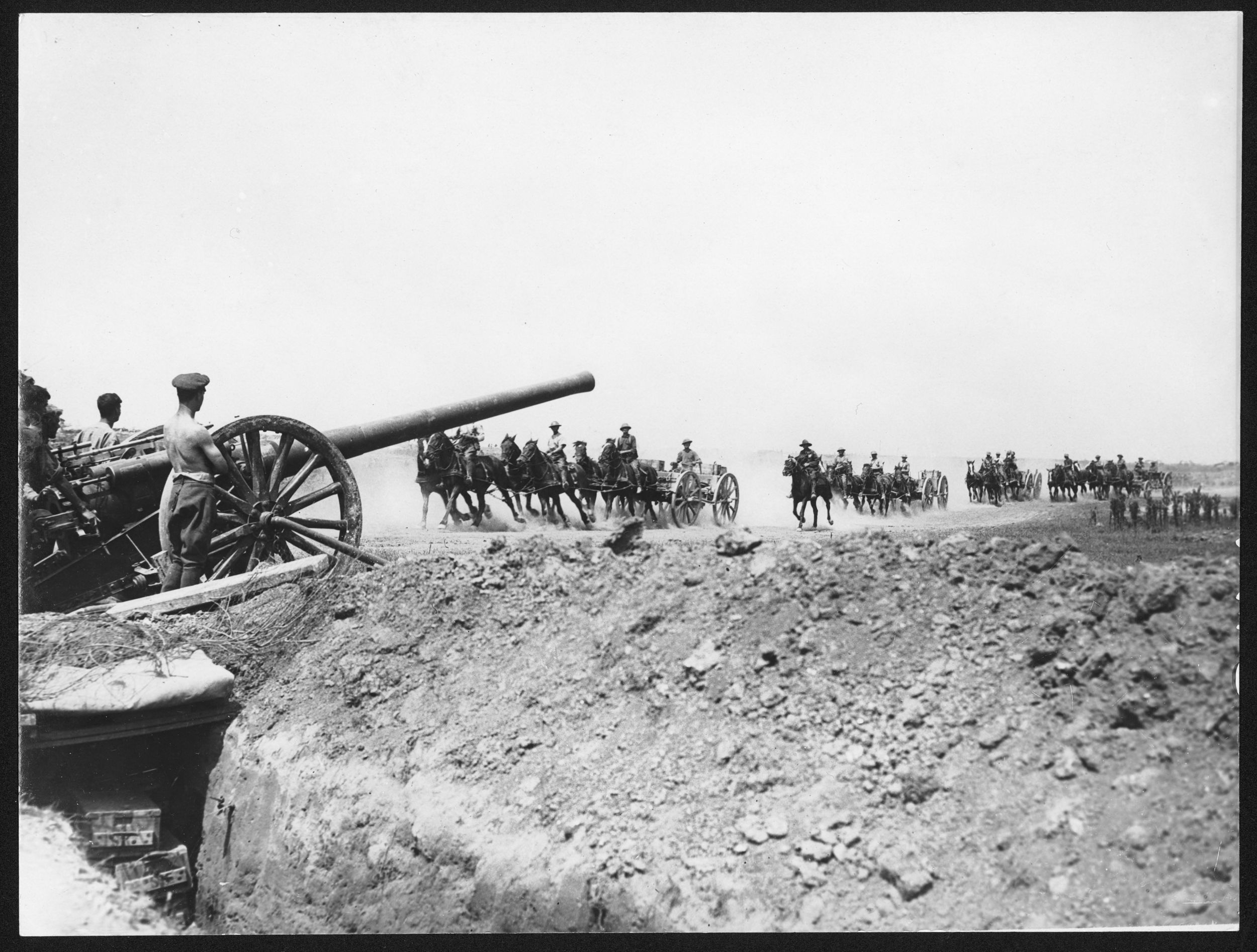
4.7-inch gun on the Somme, 1916

In early 1916 the battery was moved again, to 12th HAG with Second Army (10 April), to 'Loring's Group' with I ANZAC Corps (19 May), then to 44th (South African) HAG (5 August), and on to 34th HAG (27 August), which joined Fourth Army on the Somme in September. After the Somme fighting died down, the battery moved within Fourth Army to 7th HAG (30 November) and back to 44th (SA) HAG (23 December).

By the end of 1916 the obsolete 4.7-inch gun had been largely superseded on the Western Front by the modern 60-pounder. On 28 February 1917 the battery was made up to a strength of six guns when it was joined by a section from the newly arrived 199th Heavy Bty. (Note: 199th Heavy Bty had been formed at Woolwich on 24 June 1916; its other sections were posted to 1/2nd London and 133rd (2nd County Palatine) Hvy Btys.) It then moved north on 13 March to join 15th HAG with First Army, arriving on 21 March. Soon afterwards (15 April) it was switched south again to Fifth Army where it joined 9th HAG on 20 April. Through the early summer the battery continued to be switched rapidly from one HAG to another: 42nd (arriving 19 May), 16th with Third Army (5 July), 52nd with Second Army (9 July), 99th (12 July), then back to 52nd (6 August), and finally 11th (7 September).

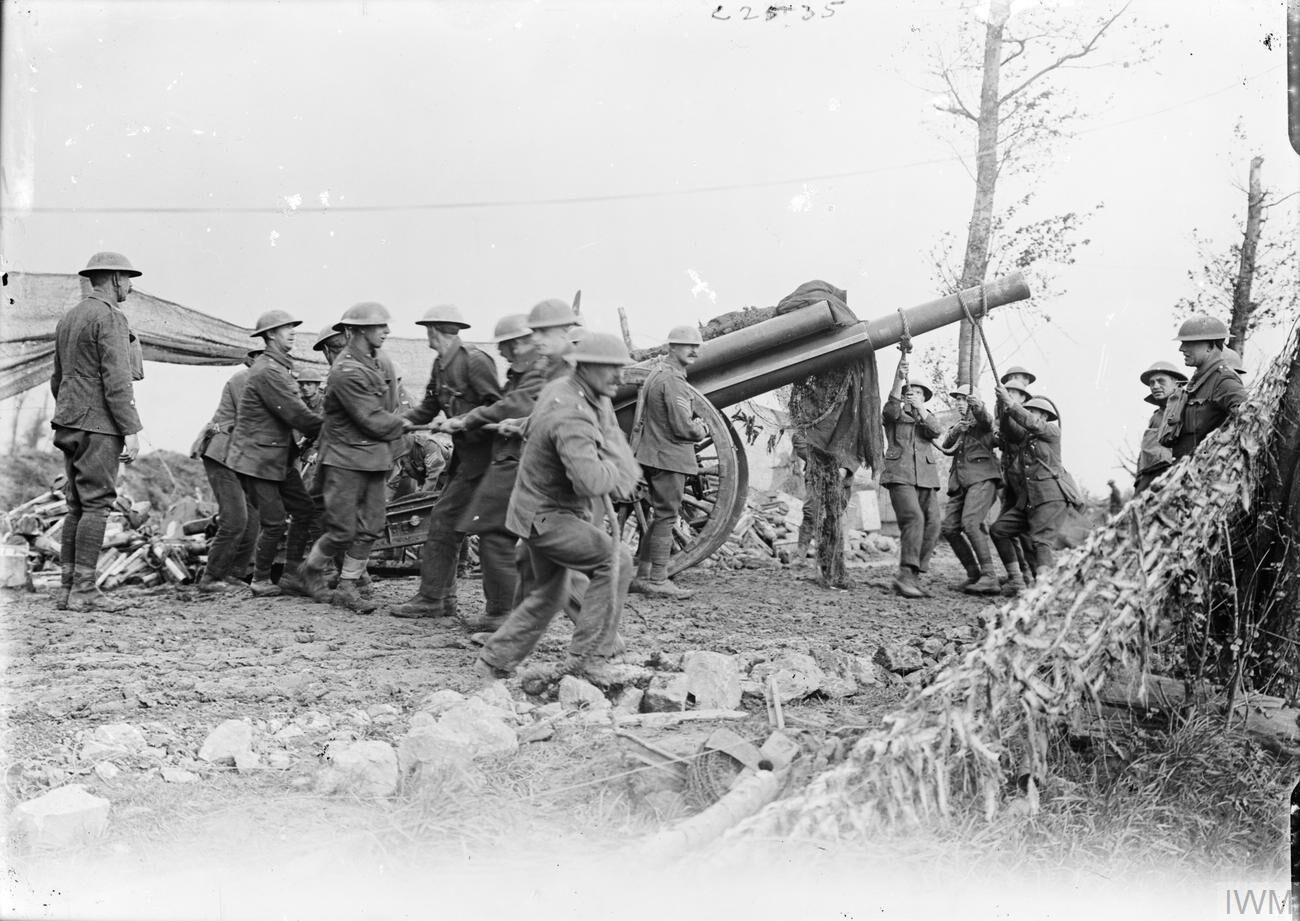
RGA manhandling a 60-pounder gun at Ypres, 1917

By now, Second Army was involved in the Third Ypres Offensive, taking the lead at the Battles of the Menin Road Ridge, Polygon Wood and Broodseinde, which were notable artillery victories. The 60-pounders were used for counter-battery (CB) fire before the attack, and then as part of the creeping barrage that led the infantry onto their objectives. However, the subsequent attacks (the Battles of Poelcappelle, First Passchendaele and Second Passchendaele) were failures. The British batteries were clearly observable from the Passchendaele Ridge and suffered badly from counter-battery fire, while their own guns sank into the mud and became difficult to aim and fire.

While the Ypres offensive was still continuing, the German and Austrian victory at Caporetto on the Italian Front led to British forces being rushed from Flanders to shore up the Italian Army. Even before their defeat the Italians had asked for the loan of heavy artillery, and now a number of units were hurriedly sent by rail, including 1/1st Warwickshire Battery, which went on 14 November.

==== Italian Front ====
On arrival, 1/1st Warwickshire Bty joined 24th HAG (renamed 24th Bde RGA in February 1918), with which it remained for the rest of the war. The battery was the only 60-pounder unit in the brigade, the rest being the 105th, 172nd, 229th and 247th Siege Btys. By 6 December its guns went into action on the Montello Hill, supporting the Italian army, which had been critically short of heavy artillery. The situation was stabilised by the end of the year, but 24th HAG remained in Italy.

Apart from some CB shoots, there was little activity through the winter months. At the end of March 1918, 1/1st Warwickshire Hvy Bty moved to a position south of the Asiago plateau supporting VIII Italian Corps. The gunsites were in wooded mountainous terrain and the guns had to be manhandled into position. They carried out trench bombardment while awaiting the next Austrian offensive (the Second Battle of the Piave River). This finally came on 15 June. Despite some initial Austrian gains, 48th (South Midland) Division held its main positions. The British heavy batteries systematically destroyed the Austrian guns on the Asiago, notwithstanding poor visibility early on (Royal Air Force observation aircraft were able to direct the fire later) and the Austrian offensive failed all along the front.

Preparations then began for the final battle on the Italian Front, the stunning success of the Battle of Vittorio Veneto. The British were relieved in the Asiago sector and moved to join the British-commanded Tenth Italian Army near Treviso. 24th HAG supported a number of British and French raids during September and October, then on 23 October the preliminary attacks began, supported by 24th HAG's guns. The main British assault crossed the River Piave on 27 October, with the heavy guns engaging all known Austrian gun positions and providing a protective barrage on either flank. A bridge was ready by 29 October and the heavy guns crossed the river. By 1 November the Austrian army had collapsed and the pursuing British troops had left their heavy guns far in the rear. Austrian signed the Armistice of Villa Giusti on 3 November, ending the war in Italy.

After the Armistice, 24th HAG was involved in securing prisoners and captured enemy guns. Demobilisation of the batteries in Italy began at Christmas 1918 and by March they were down to cadre strength. 1/1st Warwickshire Heavy Bty passed into suspended animation in 1919.

=== 2/1st South Midland (Warwickshire) Heavy Battery ===
The 2/1st Battery served in 61st (2nd South Midland) Division, first at Northampton in First Army, Central Force, then at Chelmsford when it replaced the 1st South Midland Division in coastal defence. In February 1916 the battery left the division and took over the old 4.7-inch guns of 117th Heavy Battery RGA, which was preparing to move to France. For the rest of the war 2/1st Battery served in Home Defence, from September 1916 to August 1917 with 67th (2nd Home Counties) Division at Ramsgate and Sandwich in Kent, and from January 1918 until the Armistice with the Cyclist Division at Ramsgate.

== Interwar ==
=== 204 (Warwickshire) Medium Battery ===
The battery was reformed on 7 February 1920 at Saltley as 204 (Warwickshire) Medium Battery, forming part of 7th (Cornwall and Warwickshire) Medium Brigade, Royal Garrison Artillery, which became 51st (Cornwall and Warwickshire) Medium Brigade, RGA when the TF was reorganised as the Territorial Army (TA) in 1921. This was an awkward arrangement, Saltley being many miles from the brigade HQ at Truro and the other batteries at Padstow, Par and Penzance.

On 1 October 1932 the brigade was broken up: the Cornish elements were separated to form a new 56th (Cornwall) Anti-Aircraft (AA) brigade, while a new 51st (Midland) Medium Brigade was formed in which 204 (Warwickshire) Bty was brigaded with geographically closer batteries from Staffordshire and Shropshire.

=== 204 (Warwickshire) Anti-Aircraft Battery ===
During the 1930s the increasing need for anti-aircraft (AA) defence for Britain's cities was addressed by converting a number of existing TA units into AA units. On 1 October 1937, 204 (Warwickshire) Bty was converted and transferred to a new 73rd Anti-Aircraft Brigade based at Wolverhampton.

=== 95th (Birmingham) AA Regiment ===
On 1 April 1939 the battery was transferred yet again, this time to provide the experienced cadre for a newly formed 95th (Birmingham) AA Regiment (RA 'brigades' became 'regiments' on 1 January 1939):

- RHQ at Washwood Heath, Birmingham
- 204 (Warwickshire) AA Bty at Saltley
- 293 AA Bty at Washwood Heath

== World War II ==
=== Mobilisation ===
The TA's AA units were mobilised on 23 September 1938 during the Munich Crisis, with units manning their emergency positions within 24 hours, even though many did not yet have their full complement of men or equipment. The emergency lasted three weeks, and they were stood down on 13 October. In February 1939 the existing AA defences came under the control of a new Anti-Aircraft Command. In June, as the international situation worsened, a partial mobilisation of the TA was begun in a process known as 'couverture', whereby each AA unit did a month's tour of duty in rotation to man selected AA gun and searchlight positions. On 24 August, AA Command was fully mobilised at its war stations ahead of the declaration of war.

95th AA Regiment formed part of 34th (South Midland) AA Brigade, based at Coventry and responsible for the air defence of Birmingham and Coventry in 4 AA Division.

At that time the three heavy AA (HAA) regiments in 34 AA Bde had only 24 guns (four of them out of action) at Birmingham and 12 at Coventry. By the start of the Battle of Britain this had risen to 64 guns at Birmingham and 44 at Coventry.

From 1 June 1940, AA gun regiments manning 3-inch, 3.7-inch or 4.5-inch guns were officially designated as HAA to distinguish them from the newer light AA or LAA units that were being formed.

=== Battle of Britain ===
Although most of the Luftwaffe air raids during the Battle of Britain and the early part of the night Blitz concentrated on London and the South and East Coasts, the West Midlands also suffered badly, with Birmingham and Coventry experiencing heavy raids in August and October.

A new 340 HAA Bty was formed on 1 August 1940 and regimented with 95th HAA Rgt on 25 September 1940. The regiment sent a cadre to 210th Training Regiment at Oswestry to provide the basis for a new 401 Bty; this was formed on 12 December 1940 and later joined 122nd HAA Rgt. With the continued expansion of AA Command, 34 AA Bde came under the command of a new 11 AA Division, which took over responsibility for the West Midlands on 1 November 1940.

=== Coventry Blitz ===
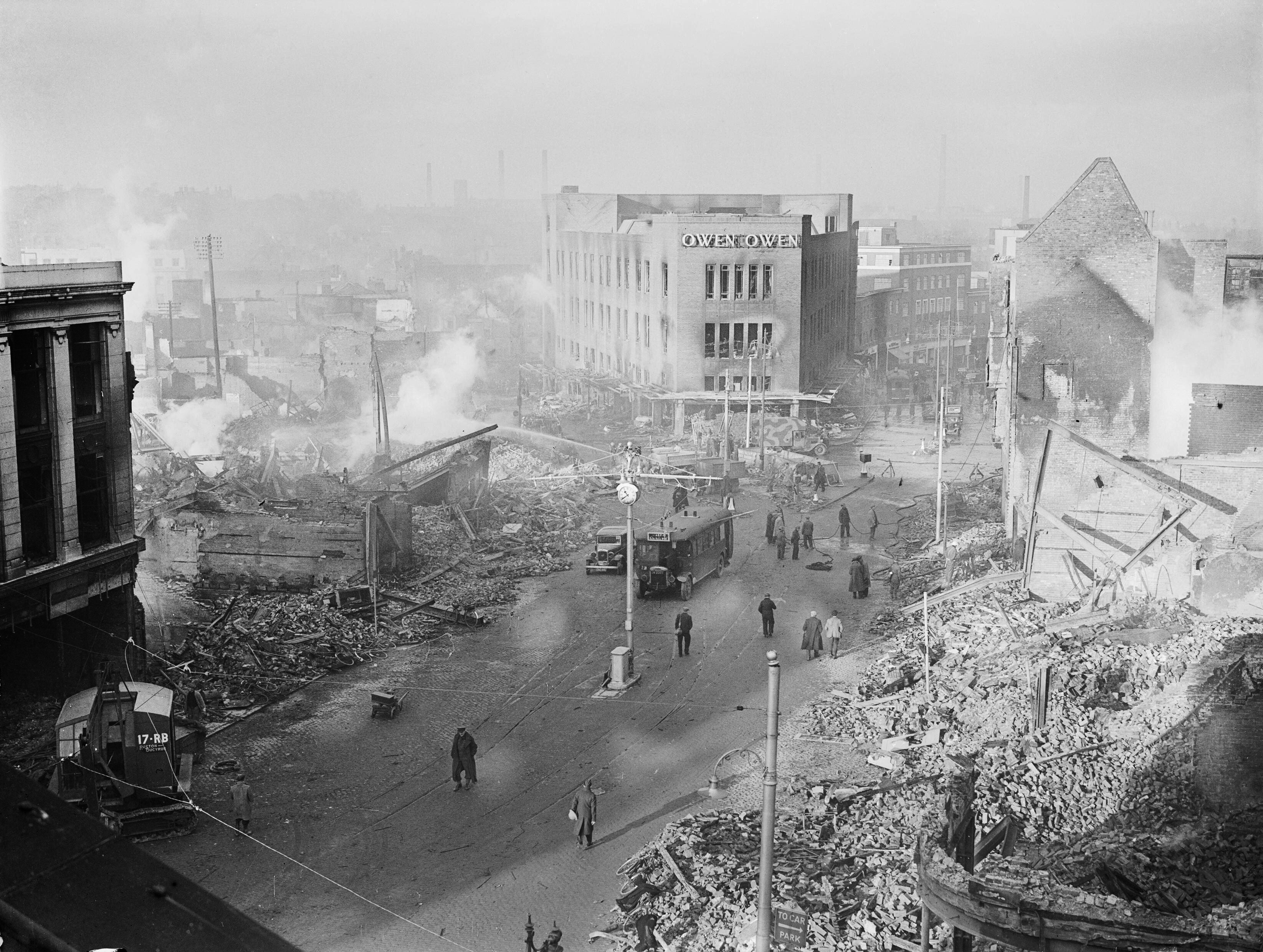
Coventry city centre following the 14 November air raid

The new division was still being formed when the Luftwaffe launched a series of devastating raids, beginning with the notorious Coventry Blitz on 14/15 November. The Coventry raid was preceded by a dozen pathfinder aircraft of Kampfgeschwader 100 riding an X-Gerät beam to drop flares and incendiary bombs on the target. The huge fires that broke out in the congested city centre then attracted successive 40-strong waves of bombers flying at heights between 12,000 and 20,000 feet to saturate the defences. The AA Defence Commander (AADC) of 95th HAA Rgt had prepared a series of concentrations to be fired using sound-locators and GL Mk. I gun-laying radar, and 128 concentrations were fired before the bombing severed all lines of communication and the noise drowned out sound-location. The HAA batteries fought on in isolation. Some gun positions were able to fire at searchlight beam intersections, glimpsed through the smoke and guessing the range. Although the Coventry guns fired 10 rounds a minute for the whole 10-hour raid, only three aircraft were shot down over the UK that night, and the city centre was gutted. The Coventry raid was followed by three consecutive nights (19–22 November) of attacks on Birmingham and other Black Country industrial towns including West Bromwich, Dudley and Tipton.

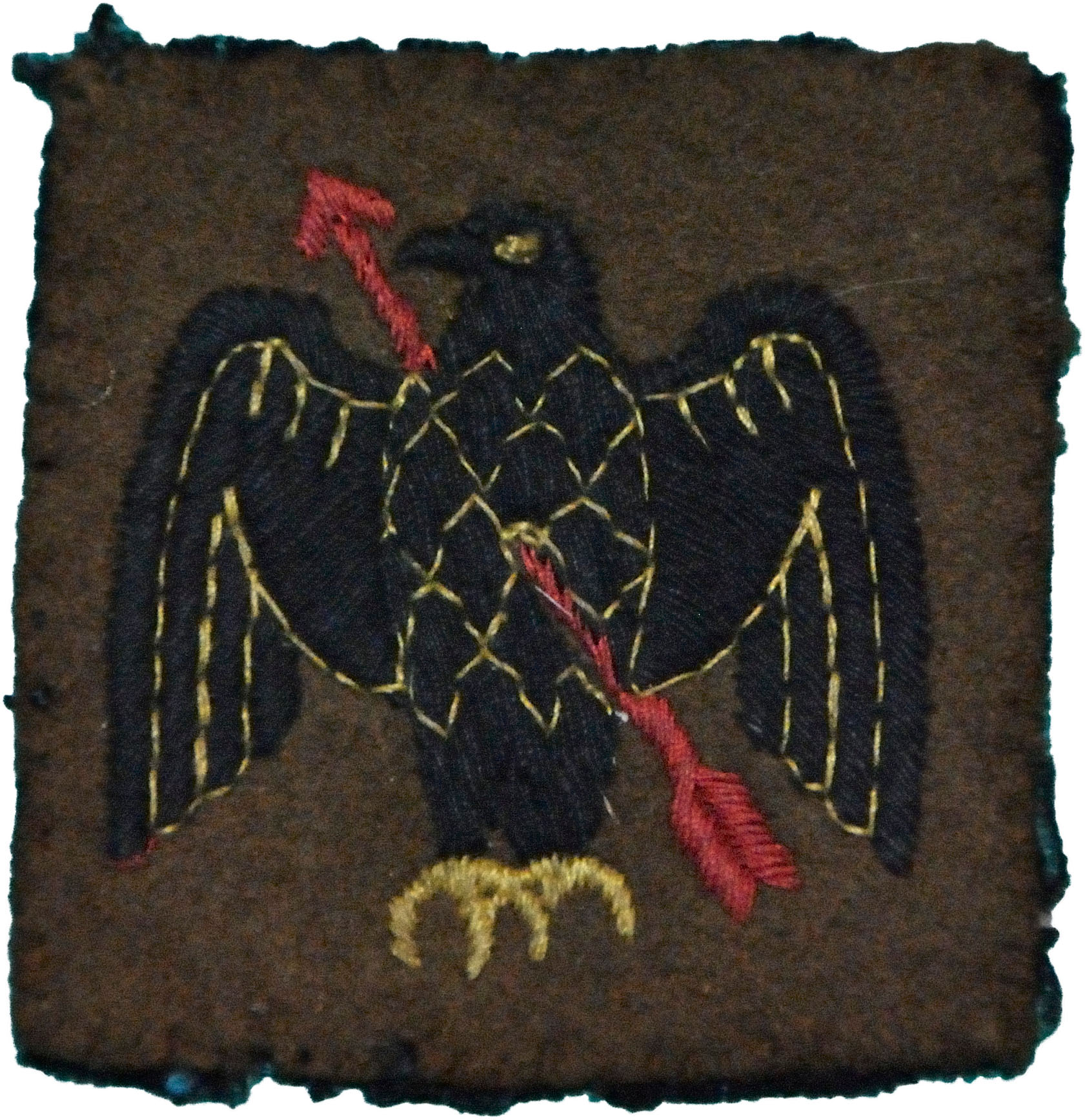
Formation sign of 11 AA Division

The change in enemy tactics led to additional HAA guns being moved from London to the West Midlands. By March 1941, a new 67 AA Bde had been created in 11 AA Division by splitting 34 AA Bde: 95th HAA Rgt transferred to the new formation.

=== Birmingham Blitz ===
Birmingham was bombed again during December (3, 4, 11) and on 11 March 1941, but the full Birmingham Blitz came in April 1941, with heavy raids on the nights of 9/10 and 10/11 of the month, causing extensive damage and casualties.

The Blitz is generally held to have ended on 16 May 1941 with another attack on Birmingham. By now the HAA sites had the advantage of GL Mk I* radar with an elevation finding (E/F or 'Effie') attachment, and several attackers were turned away by accurate fire and their bombs scattered widely, some on nearby Nuneaton. The city was attacked again in July, but the Luftwaffe bombing offensive was effectively over. The West Midlands had been the hardest hit area of the UK after London and Merseyside.

Another newly raised battery, 405 HAA Bty, joined the regiment on 5 March 1941; this had been formed on 16 January 1941 at 205th HAA Training Rgt at Arborfield from a cadre supplied by 98th HAA Rgt. 95th HAA Regiment sent a further cadre to 211th HAA Training Rgt at Oswestry to form 449 HAA Bty on 12 June 1941; this joined 130th HAA Rgt

405 HAA Battery left on 2 August 1941 and joined 3rd HAA Rgt of the West African Artillery (WAA) in the Gold Coast. The battery later served in the Burma Campaign. 198 HAA Battery joined on 7 October 1941 from 122nd HAA Rgt, but its stay was short as the regiment was converted to the three-battery establishment of units deploying overseas and it transferred to 136th HAA Rgt on 4 November 1941. That month 95th HAA Rgt left AA Command and joined the War Office Reserve. Before the end of the year the regiment had embarked for overseas service with 204, 293 and 340 HAA Btys.

=== India ===
The regiment was among reinforcements sent to India following the Japanese invasion of Malaya. It arrived at Bombay on 11 April 1942 and moved to Barrackpore outside Calcutta where it came under the command of 1 Indian AA Bde. It spent the whole of 1943 in the Calcutta area.

Calcutta was just within range of bombers operating from Burma and the Imperial Japanese Army Air Service began raiding the city during December 1942, in an attempt to disrupt the operation of the docks and to create panic among the population. Attacks resumed in November 1943.

The air threat to Calcutta declined in 1944 and on 1 April 95th HAA Rgt the regiment with 204, 293 and 340 HAA Btys was 'placed in suspended animation' on 14 March 1944 and their personnel dispersed to other assignments for the rest of the war.

== Postwar ==
When the TA was reconstituted on 1 January 1947, the regiment reformed at Sheldon as 495th (Birmingham) (Mixed) HAA Rgt, RA ('Mixed' indicating that some of its personnel were drawn from the Women's Royal Army Corps). It formed part of 80 AA Bde at Sutton Coldfield, but that formation was disbanded in September the following year.

(A new 95th HAA Regiment was formed in the Regular Army on 1 April 1947 by the redesignation of the war-formed 135th HAA Rgt.)

In 1954, 495th HAA Rgt absorbed 320th (South Midland) HAA Rgt at Washwood Heath, Birmingham.

When AA Command was disbanded on 10 March 1955, a wholesale reduction of AA units in the TA followed. 495th HAA Regiment amalgamated with 623rd (Warwick) LAA Rgt to form 443rd (Warwickshire) LAA Rgt, with Q and R Btys derived from 495th HAA Rgt. In 1961 there was another round of reductions, with Q Bty joining 268th (Warwickshire) Field Rgt and R Bty joining with part of 442nd LAA Rgt to reform 7th Battalion, Royal Warwickshire Regiment and the batteries' individual identities were lost.
