= 96th Siege Battery, Royal Garrison Artillery =

96th Siege Battery, RGA
- Cap Badge of the Royal Regiment of Artillery
- Active: 1 January 1916–1919
- Country: United Kingdom
- Branch: British Army
- Role: Siege Artillery
- Part of: Royal Garrison Artillery
- Garrison/HQ: Pembroke Dock
- Engagements: Western Front (World War I)

The 96th Siege Battery was a unit of Britain's Royal Garrison Artillery (RGA) raised during World War I. It manned heavy howitzers on the Western Front from 1916 to 1918, beginning with the Attack on the Gommecourt Salient on the First day on the Somme.

== Mobilisation ==
On the outbreak of war in August 1914, units of the part-time Territorial Force (TF) were invited to volunteer for Overseas Service and most of the Glamorgan Royal Garrison Artillery did so. This unit had mobilised as part of No 26 Coastal Fire Command, responsible for the defence of Swansea, Cardiff and Barry.

By October 1914, the campaign on the Western Front was bogging down into Trench warfare and there was an urgent need for batteries of siege artillery to be sent to France. The WO decided that the TF coastal gunners were well enough trained to take over many of the duties in the coastal defences, releasing Regular RGA gunners for service in the field, Soon the TF RGA companies that had volunteered for overseas service were also supplying trained gunners to RGA units serving overseas and providing cadres to form complete new units.

According to WO Instruction No 181 of December 1915, 96th Siege Battery was to be formed at Pembroke Dock by three officers and 78 other ranks (the establishment of a full company) drawn from the Glamorgan RGA. The battery actually formed on 1 January 1916 with three officers and 90 men from the Glamorgan RGA and 64 recruits from the Pembroke Dock RGA establishment, under the command of Major C.H.M. Sturgis. It went out to the Western Front on 21 May 1916 and joined 19th Heavy Artillery Group in Third Army on 25 May, taking over four 9.2-inch howitzers in existing emplacements near Pommier from 62nd Siege Bty.

== War Service ==
=== Gommecourt ===
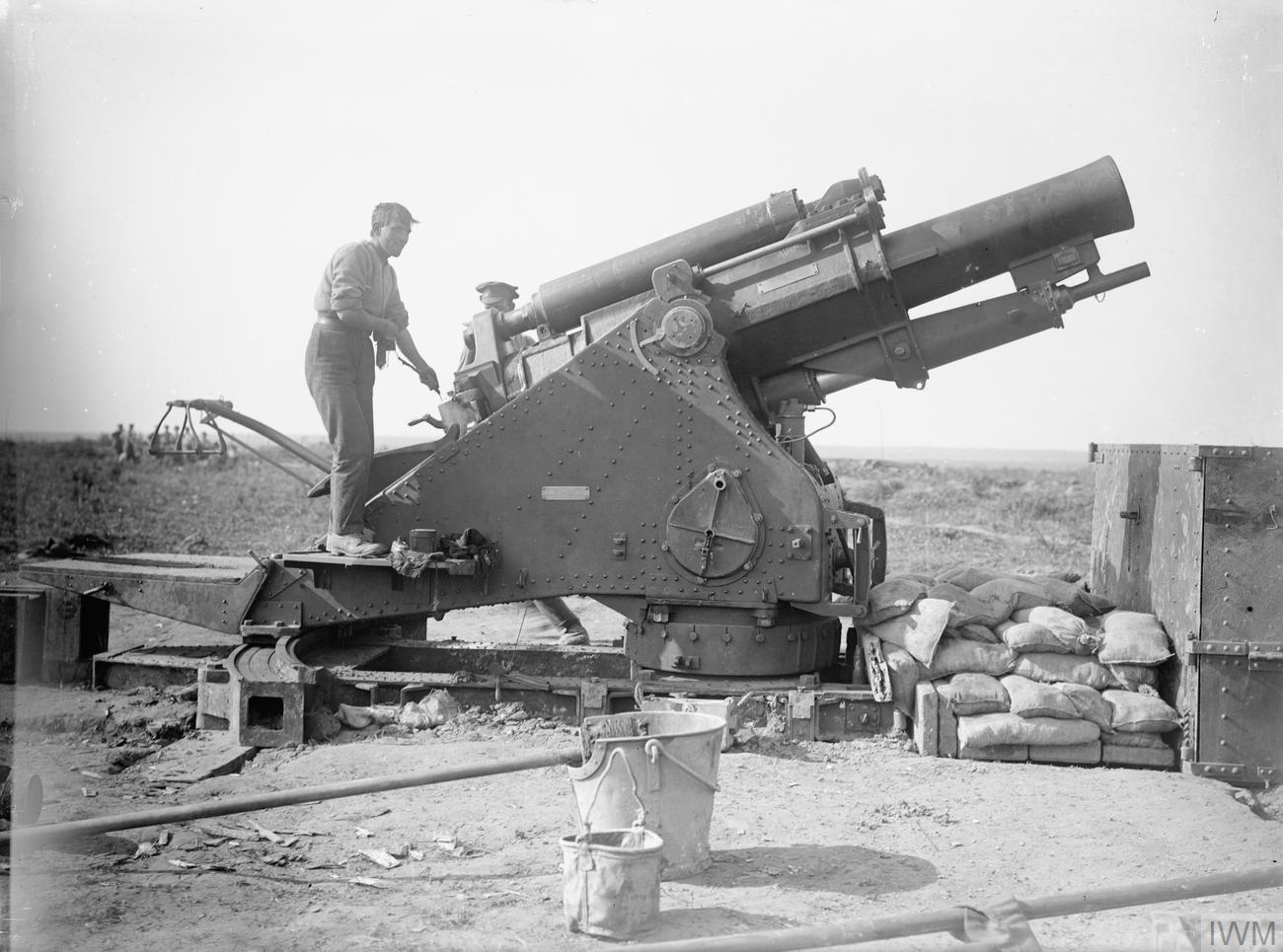
9.2-inch howitzer in action on the Somme, 1916.

19th Heavy Artillery Group (HAG) was assigned to support VII Corps' Attack on the Gommecourt Salient in the forthcoming 'Big Push' (the Battle of the Somme). Its main role was to use the high-angle fire of its howitzers to bombard German trenches and strongpoints facing 46th (North Midland) Division's attack frontage. The specific targets assigned to 96th Siege Bty were 'The Z', 'Little Z' and Pigeon Wood (targets shared with the modern 6-inch 26 cwt howitzers of 101st Siege Bty), the Gommecourt village end of Oxus Trench (shared with the obsolete 6-inch 30 cwt howitzers of 102nd Siege Bty), the trenches to La Brayelle Farm, and Ford Trench, all at the left end of 46th (NM) Division's front. Ammunition for the modern howitzers like the 9.2-inch was in short supply, and had to be carefully rationed during the preliminary bombardment. At all times during daylight, No 8 Squadron Royal Flying Corps had a BE2c observation aircraft in the air spotting fall of shot for 19th HAG's batteries. The howitzers joined in the bombardment on 25 June ('V' Day, four days before 'Z' day, the date set for the attack). The planned rate of fire was 50 rounds per gun on V to X days, then 70 rounds on Y day. Because of poor weather for observation, the attack was postponed for two days, and the additional days (Y1 and Y2) were used for further bombardment. By Y1, two important German communication trenches running back into Gommecourt village (Ford Trench to the British) had been rendered impassable by 96th Siege Bty's shells. One of the pair of German heavy mortars (Minenwerfers) in this sector had been buried by a howitzer shell, and the other withdrawn. But overall, the damage to the German positions was not severe.

A final bombardment began at 06.25 on Z Day (1 July), with 65 minutes of intense fire before H Hour at 07.30. Of 96th Siege Bty's guns, No 1 fired 120 rounds, No 2 114 rounds, and the other two 90 rounds each, and the battery reported that the oil in the guns' hydraulic recoil buffers had boiled. At 07.30 the guns lifted onto their pre-arranged targets in the German support and reserve lines as the infantry got out of their forward trenches and advanced towards Gommecourt behind a smoke screen. The attack of 139th (Sherwood Foresters) Brigade on the left, south of The Z was initially successful, the leading waves getting into the first German trench albeit with heavy casualties, and some parties entered the second line. But they were hit by enfilade fire from The Z, even though the RFC observers reported British troops in the Z and Little Z. 96th Siege Bty's Forward Observation Officer (FOO), Captain W.R. Brown, also thought that he could see British troops in this part of the line. Smoke and mist made observation difficult, and some of the German troops were wearing the 'coal scuttle' helmet (Stahlhelm) for the first time, so the observers were probably mistaken. The result, however, was that no further shelling from 96th or the other RGA batteries was brought down on the Z positions. Fire from these positions prevented 139th Brigade's follow-up waves and ammunition carrying parties from crossing No man's land. The attack had been halted by 09.00 and the leading attack waves were destroyed or driven out of their small gains by the end of the day.

The Gommecourt attack had only been a diversion for the main attack of the First day on the Somme, and it was not renewed after the failure on 1 July. Third Army was not involved in any major operations for the rest of the year. 96th Siege Bty remained in 19th HAG during the summer, but the practice was to move batteries and HAG headquarters around as required, On 18 October the battery transferred to 48th HAG, then on 28 November to 46th HAG, and then was directly attached to VII Corps Heavy Artillery from 27 December to 6 January 1916. It briefly rejoined 46th HAG, then went to 39th HAG before joining 54th HAG on 23 January.

=== 1917 ===
On 21 March 1917 the battery moved to join 59th HAG in Fifth Army. The German army was in the process of retreating to the Hindenburg Line (Operation Alberich), which entailed much repositioning of British guns. Fifth Army then attacked the Hindenburg Line during April and May 1917 (the Battle of Bullecourt).

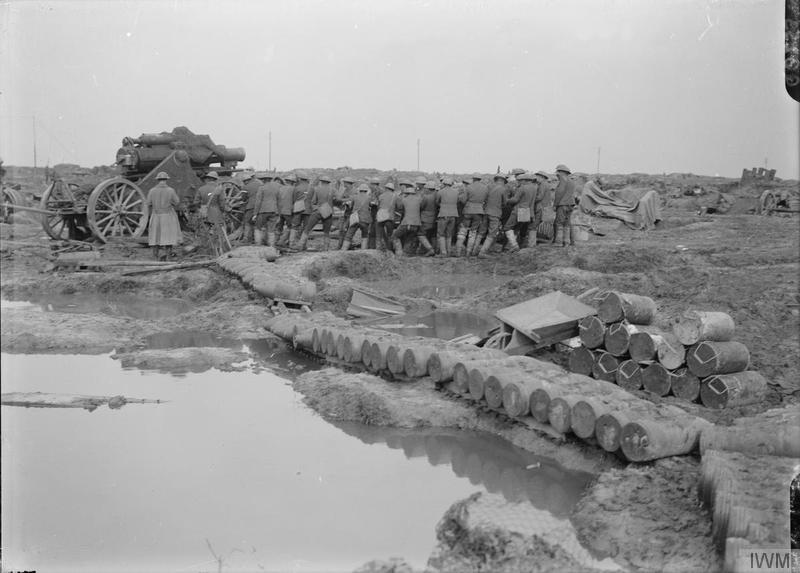
Positioning a 9.2-inch howitzer and its ammunition in the mud of the Ypres Salient, 1917.

On 10 July 1917 the battery left 59th HAG and moved to 15th HAG in First Army, arriving on 13 July. During the summer First Army was involved in the Battle of Hill 70 at Lens. From 22 August, 96th Siege Bty came under the command of 2nd Canadian HAG while the Canadian Corps was heavily engaged in the Hill 70 fighting. For the rest of the year the First Army front was a quiet sector, and 96th Siege Bty left on 5 October, moving back to Fifth Army, where it joined 36th HAG on 11 October. Fifth Army was fighting the last stages of the Third Ypres Offensive: the First and Second Battle of Passchendaele. Conditions for the artillery were very bad: British batteries were clearly observable from the Passchendaele Ridge and suffered badly from counter-battery fire, while their own guns sank into the mud and became difficult to aim and fire.

=== 1918 ===
96th Siege Bty returned to the command of First Army at the end of the year, joining 91st HAG on 14 December. By now HAG allocations were becoming more fixed, and on 1 February 1918 they were converted into permanent RGA brigades. Unlike most RGA batteries, 96th Siege Bty had not been raised to the higher establishment of 6 guns during 1917, and remained a 4-gun battery of 9.2-inch howitzers until the end of the war. It was the heavy component of 91st (9.2-inch Howitzer) Bde, RGA, along with three 6-inch howitzer batteries, which served with First Army until the end of the war.

The battery got a period of rest from 5 to 26 February 1918, and then served through the defensive battles of the German spring offensive, 91st Bde RGA seeing much action with IX Corps on the Aisne. It was then with First Army during the Allied advances of the Hundred Days Offensive – the Second Battle of Arras, Battle of the Canal du Nord, Second Battle of Cambrai, and Battle of the Selle before the Armistice with Germany ended the fighting in November.

In the interim order of battle for the postwar army the battery was supposed to form 167th Bty RGA, but this was rescinded after the signing of the Treaty of Versailles, and the battery was disbanded in 1919.

== See also ==
Newsreel film of a 9.2-inch howitzer being fired.
