= 359th =

359th may refer to:

- 359th Bombardment Squadron, United States Air Force unit
- 359th Fighter Group, unit of the Kentucky Air National Guard, stationed at Louisville Air National Guard Base, Kentucky
- 359th Fighter Squadron, unit of the Tennessee Air National Guard 164th Airlift Wing
- 359th Infantry Division (Wehrmacht), German infantry division in World War II
- 359th Siege Battery, Royal Garrison Artillery, established under the Glamorgan Royal Garrison Artillery in Lavernock in 1917
- 359th Infantry Regiment, a unit of the United States Army

== See also ==
- 359 (number)
- 359, the year 359 (CCCLIX) of the Julian calendar
- 359 BC
