= 121st Siege Battery, Royal Garrison Artillery =

121st Siege Battery, RGA
- Cap Badge of the Royal Regiment of Artillery
- Active: 22 March 1916–1919
- Country: United Kingdom
- Branch: British Army
- Role: Siege Artillery
- Part of: Royal Garrison Artillery
- Garrison/HQ: Pembroke Dock
- Engagements: Western Front (World War I)

The 121st Siege Battery was a unit of Britain's Royal Garrison Artillery (RGA) raised during World War I. It manned heavy howitzers on the Western Front from 1916 to 1918.

== Mobilisation ==
On the outbreak of war in August 1914, units of the part-time Territorial Force (TF) were invited to volunteer for Overseas Service and most of the Glamorgan Royal Garrison Artillery did so. This unit had mobilised as part of No 26 Coastal Fire Command, responsible for the defence of Swansea, Cardiff and Barry.

By October 1914, the campaign on the Western Front was bogging down into Trench warfare and there was an urgent need for batteries of siege artillery to be sent to France. The WO decided that the TF coastal gunners were well enough trained to take over many of the duties in the coastal defences, releasing Regular RGA gunners for service in the field. Soon the TF RGA companies that had volunteered for overseas service were also supplying trained gunners to RGA units serving overseas and providing cadres to form complete new units.

== War Service ==
=== 1916 ===
121st Siege Battery, RGA, was raised at Pembroke Dock on 22 March 1916 under Army Council Instruction 701 of 31 March 1916 with a cadre of 3 officers and 78 other ranks from the Glamorgan RGA. It went out to the Western Front in July 1916, manning four 9.2-inch howitzers. It joined I ANZAC Corps in Fifth Army on 15 July in time for the Battle of Pozières in the Somme Offensive. It transferred to 5th Heavy Artillery Group (HAG) in Second Army on 4 August, then returned to the Somme with 28th HAG in Fourth Army on 14 September. The Battle of Flers-Courcelette was launched the following day and largescale fighting continued on Fourth Army's front into November. 121st Siege Bty transferred to the command of 64th HAG within Fourth Army from 3 October.

=== 1917 ===
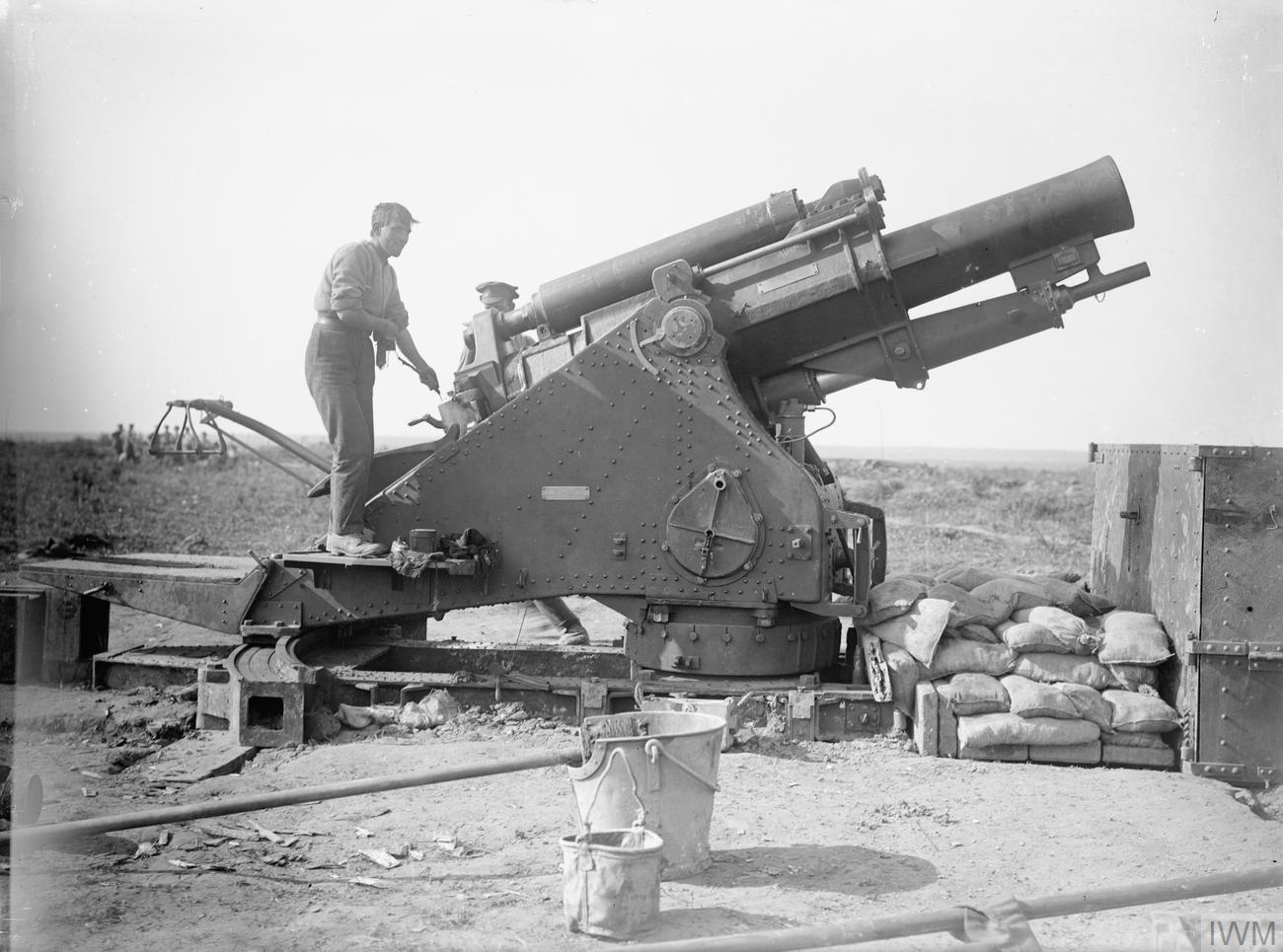
9.2-inch howitzer in action on the Somme, 1916.

121st Siege Bty came under the command of 18th HAG on 15 April 1917 as that group transferred from Fourth to First Army, which was engaged in the Arras Offensive. The battery transferred to the command of 57th HAG on 14 May as the Arras operations wound down. It left 57th HAG on 10 June and joined 53rd HAG on 17 June as First Army continued minor operations.

On 9 July 1917 the battery moved to 24th HAG (alongside 172nd Siege Bty, also raised by the Glamorgan RGA), which was attached to the French army. The group then joined Fifth Army on 1 August, just after the start of the Third Ypres Offensive. Fifth Army's guns were suffering badly from German counter-battery (CB) fire, and the offensive bogged down. A second push on 16 August (the Battle of Langemarck) suffered from rushed artillery planning and was unsuccessful.

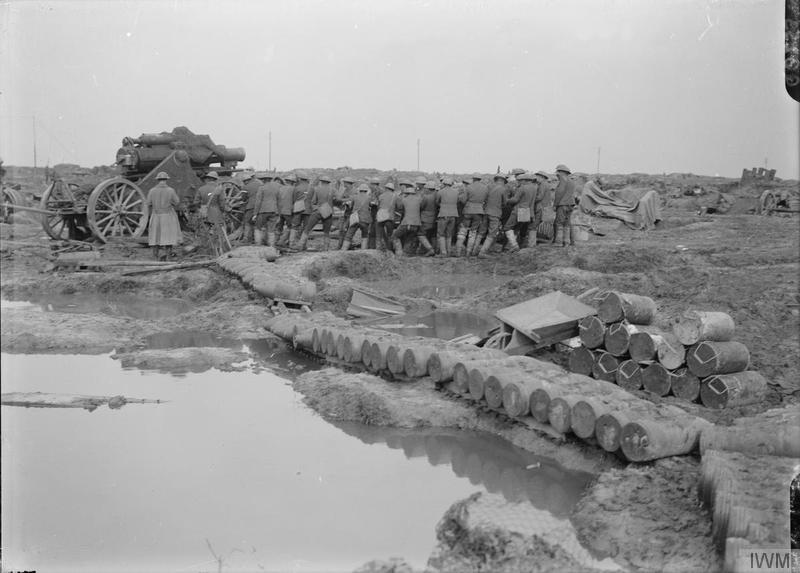
Positioning a 9.2-inch howitzer and its ammunition in the mud of the Ypres Salient, 1917.

On 16 September the group was transferred to Second Army when that formation took over control of the faltering offensive: the Battles of the Menin Road, Polygon Wood and Broodseinde were highly successful because of the weight of artillery brought to bear on German positions. But as the offensive continued with the Battle of Poelcappelle and First and Second Battles of Passchendaele, the tables were turned: British batteries were clearly observable from the Passchendaele Ridge and were subjected to CB fire, while their own guns sank into the mud and became difficult to aim and fire.

121st Siege Bty had received reinforcements on 5 September, when it was joined by a section from 428th Siege Bty, just arrived from Home. (Note: 428th Siege Battery, RGA, was formed on 21 April 1917 at Prees Heath Army Camp. Its personnel went out to the Western Front on 29 August 1917. On 5 September one section joined II Corps and was posted to 121st Siege Bty, the other joined IX Corps and was posted to 161st Siege Bty.) This was in preparation for the battery to be expanded to six 9.2-inch howitzers, but the guns do not seem to have arrived at this time. Second Army HQ and 24th HAG were sent to reinforce the Italian Front in November, but after the horrors of Passchendaele 121st Siege Bty was given an extended rest from 16 November to 5 December, nominally under the command of 6th HAG. It appears to have received its two additional howitzers during December, and returned to the Fifth Army front on 7 December as part of 5th HAG, transferring to 98th HAG on 28 December.

=== Spring 1918 ===
121st Siege Bty had another period of rest from 31 January to 19 February 1918. By now HAG allocations were becoming more fixed, and on 1 February 1918 they were converted into permanent RGA brigades. For the rest of the war the battery was part of 98th (9.2-inch Howitzer) Bde, RGA, along with three 6-inch howitzer batteries. Fifth Army was attacked on 21 March 1918, the first day of the German spring offensive. Artillery Observation Posts (OPs) were blinded by early morning mist and many were overrun along with the infantry in the forward zone. Much of the field artillery was lost, caught up in short-range fighting in the main battle zone, as were a number of RGA units either caught in the fighting or forced to abandon their guns as the Germans advanced rapidly. Others struggled to get their guns back during the 'Great Retreat'. Fourth Army HQ took over all of Fifth Army's formations and units on 2 April, and the first phase of the German offensive was halted on 4 April. Further attacks came on other parts of the front, but none broke through completely.

=== Hundred Days ===
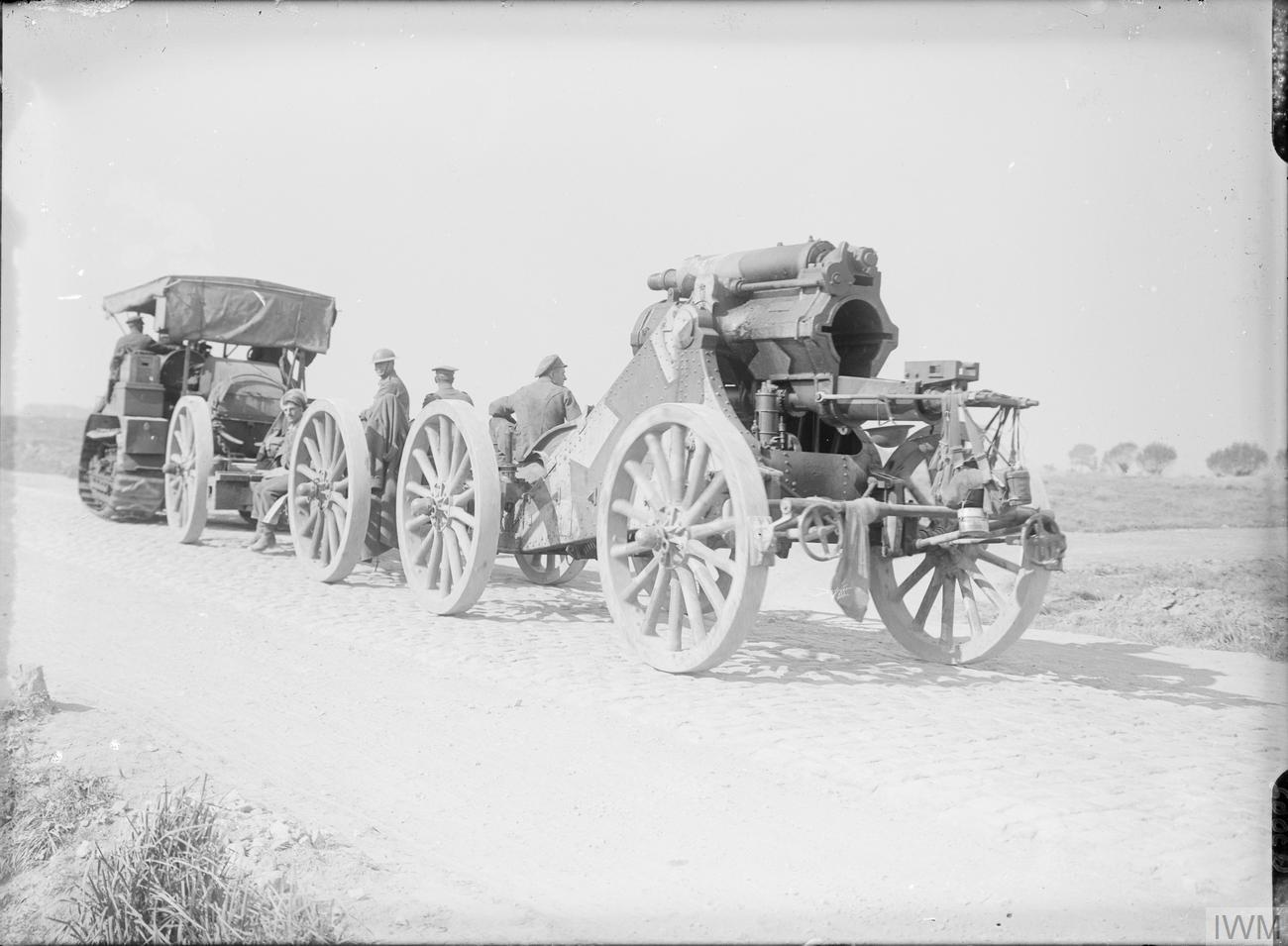
9.2-inch howitzer broken down into three loads for road movement.

Fourth Army launched the Allied counter-offensive (the Hundred Days) with the Battle of Amiens on 8 August. The artillery fireplan emphasised CB fire for the 'heavies' as well as bombarding villages and strongpoints. The heavy artillery was positioned as far forward as possible, and it was prepared to move up behind the advancing infantry.

By the end of September Fourth Army had closed up to the Hindenburg Line. On 29 September IX Corps carried out an assault crossing of the St Quentin Canal, with 98th Bde amongst the mass of artillery supporting the operation. The canal defences had largely been destroyed by the heavy guns, which continued firing on the canal banks until the last possible moment as 137th (Staffordshire) Brigade stormed the outpost line and then scrambled across the canal in the morning mist. The objectives were taken by 15.30.

On 8 October, IX Corps attacked the next German defensive position, the Beaurevoir Line. Harassing fire (HF) had been carried out on the night of 6/7 October, and all through 7 October and up to Zero the heavies carried out CB fire and shelled important localities. Once the attack went in the heavies continued intense CB and long-range HF fire until the infantry were on the objective. The RGA brigades were ready to follow up the advance, but without their cumbersome 9.2-inch howitzers.

On 11 October preparations began for IX Corps' assault on the German line along the River Selle. CB fire began on 13 October, together with bombardment by the heavy howitzers of important localities chosen by Corps HQ. On 15 and 16 October mist and rain disrupted air reconnaissance, but Zero for the Battle of the Selle was fixed on 16 October for 05.20 the next day. The first day of the battle went well, one German counter-attack being broken up when all available guns were turned onto it, but the attackers were still short of their objective, the Sambre Canal. Steady progress was also made on the second and third days as Fourth Army closed up to the canal.

IX Corps renewed its advance on 23 October, with 98th Bde part of a massive corps artillery reserve. The attack went in at 01.20 in moonlight, after the heavy guns had done the usual CB and HF bombardments, and the result were extremely satisfactory. As the regimental historian relates, 'The guns of Fourth Army demonstrated, on 23 October, the crushing effect of well co-ordinated massed artillery. they simply swept away the opposition'. After a pause to regroup and reconnoitre, IX Corps stormed across the canal on 4 November (the Battle of the Sambre). After that the campaign became a pursuit of a beaten enemy, in which the slow-moving siege guns could play no part. The war ended with the Armistice with Germany on 11 November.

In the interim order of battle for the postwar army the battery was supposed to form 156th Bty RGA, but this was rescinded after the signing of the Treaty of Versailles, and the battery was disbanded in 1919.

== See also ==
Newsreel film of a 9.2-inch howitzer being fired
