= 172nd Siege Battery, Royal Garrison Artillery =

172nd Siege Battery, RGA
- Cap Badge of the Royal Regiment of Artillery
- Active: 21 June 1916–March 1919
- Country: United Kingdom
- Branch: British Army
- Role: Siege Artillery
- Part of: Royal Garrison Artillery
- Garrison/HQ: Cardiff
- Engagements: Western Front; Italian Front

The 172nd Siege Battery was a unit of Britain's Royal Garrison Artillery (RGA) raised during World War I. It manned heavy howitzers on the Western Front and Italian Front from 1916 to 1918.

== Mobilisation ==
On the outbreak of war in August 1914, units of the part-time Territorial Force (TF) were invited to volunteer for Overseas Service and most of the Glamorgan Royal Garrison Artillery did so. This unit had mobilised as part of No 26 Coastal Fire Command, responsible for the defence of Swansea, Cardiff and Barry.

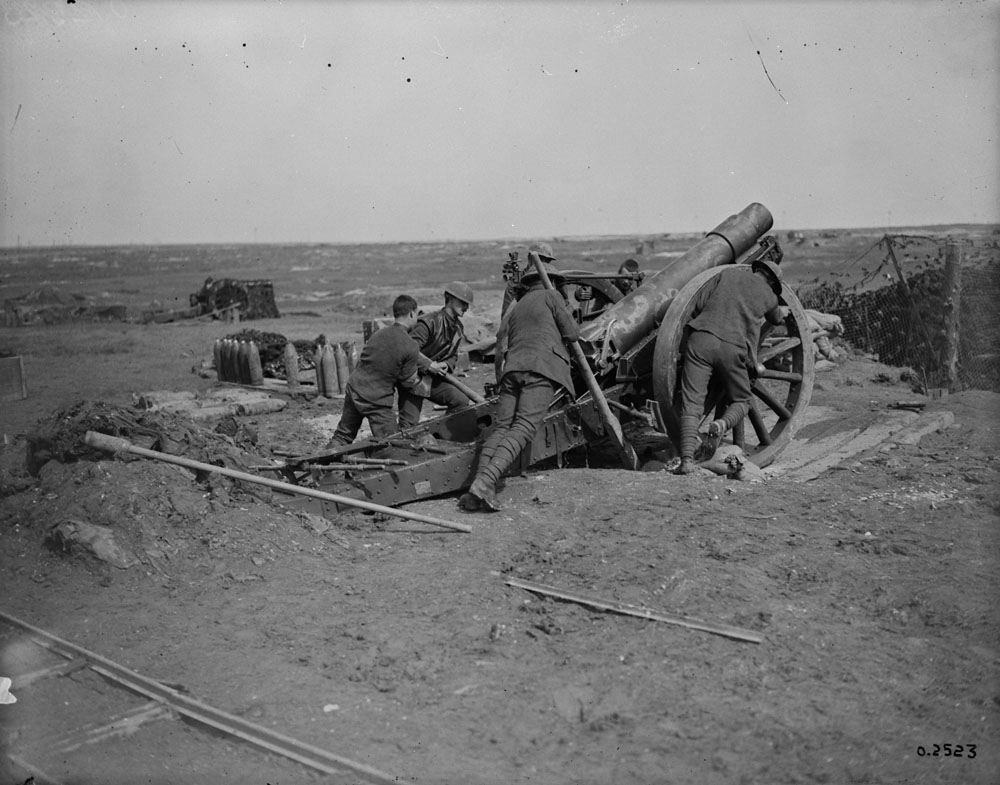
Crew positioning a 6-inch 26 cwt howitzer in 1918.

By October 1914, the campaign on the Western Front was bogging down into trench warfare and there was an urgent need for batteries of siege artillery to be sent to France. The WO decided that the TF coastal gunners were well enough trained to take over many of the duties in the coastal defences, releasing Regular RGA gunners for service in the field, Soon the TF RGA companies that had volunteered for overseas service were also supplying trained gunners to RGA units serving overseas and providing cadres to form complete new units.

172nd Siege Battery, RGA, was raised at Cardiff with three officers and 78 other ranks from the Glamorgan RGA under Army Council Instruction 1239 of 21 June 1916. It went out to the Western Front on 12 September 1916, manning four BL 6-inch 26 cwt howitzers, initially under the command of 50th (South African) Heavy Artillery Group (HAG) in Third Army. It then changed command rapidly: to 19th HAG on 4 October, to 8th HAG on 18 October, then to 47th HAG on 24 November and back to 8th HAG on 8 January 1917, all with Third Army, whose front was quiet during this period.

== War Service ==
=== Arras ===
On 24 March 1917 the battery transferred to the command of 46th HAG and then to 35th HAG on 3 April as Third Army prepared for the opening of its Arras Offensive. A larger force of guns than ever before had been assembled for this battle, and 35th HAG was assigned with seven other HAGs to VII Corps. The battle opened on 9 April and was widely successful, the counter-battery (CB) fire of the heavy howitzers having been effective. But following up the success was difficult. Batteries had to move up to get back into range (No man's land in VII Corps' sector had been 2,000 yards (1,800 m) wide) and the Germans re-positioned their guns, so the effectiveness of the prepared CB fire was lost. The offensive quickly bogged down.

=== Ypres ===
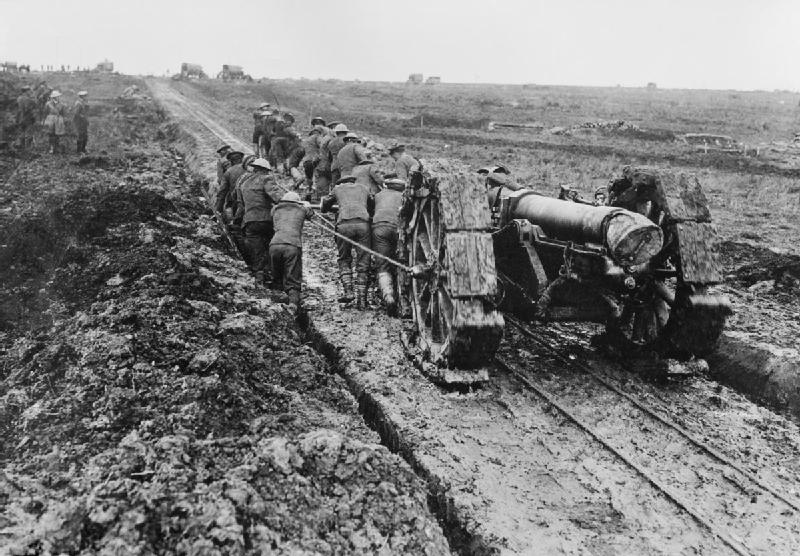
6-inch howitzer being moved through mud on the Western Front.

After the Arras offensive ended in May 1917, 172nd Siege Bty was rested from 28 May to 10 June. It then rejoined Third Army, serving with 39th and 8th HAGs. Third Army's front was quiet during the summer of 1917, but on 9 July the battery moved to 24th HAG (alongside 121st Siege Bty, also raised by the Glamorgan RGA). 24th HAG was attached to the French army, but it joined Fifth Army on 1 August, just after the start of the Third Ypres Offensive. Fifth Army's guns were suffering badly from German CB fire, and the offensive bogged down. A second push on 16 August (the Battle of Langemarck) suffered from rushed artillery planning and was unsuccessful.

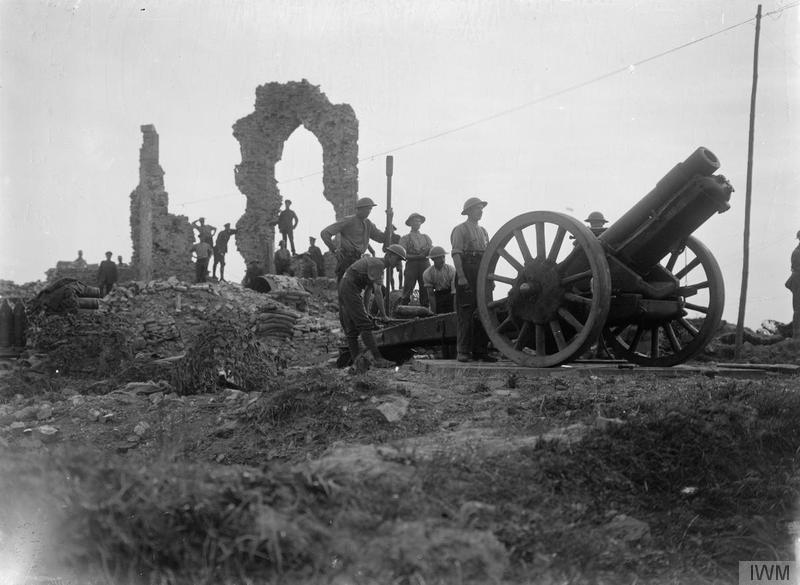
6-inch howitzer and crew during the Ypres offensive, 1917.

172nd Siege Bty received reinforcements on 26 August when it was joined by a section from 415th Siege Bty, just arrived from Home. (Note: 415th Siege Battery, RGA, was formed on 10 April 1917 at Prees Heath Army Camp. The personnel went out to the Western Front on 19 August 1917 and joined II Corps. One section was posted to 172nd Siege Bty, the other to 163rd Siege Bty.) This allowed the battery to be brought up to a strength of six 6-inch howitzers. On 16 September 24th HAG was transferred to Second Army when that formation took over control of the faltering offensive: the Battles of the Menin Road, Polygon Wood and Broodseinde were highly successful because of the weight of artillery brought to bear on German positions. But as the offensive continued with the Battle of Poelcappelle and First and Second Battles of Passchendaele, the tables were turned: British batteries were clearly observable from the Passchendaele Ridge and suffered badly from CB fire, while their own guns sank into the mud and became difficult to aim and fire.

=== Italy ===
After the disastrous Battle of Caporetto on the Italian Front, Second Army HQ and several of its sub-formations were sent to reinforce the Italian Army. 24th Bde RGA left with XIV Corps on 17 November 1917, arriving on 25 November. Its guns went into action on the Montello Hill, supporting the Italian army holding the line of the River Piave, which had been critically short of heavy artillery. The situation was stabilised by the end of the year, but XIV Corps and 24th HAG remained in Italy.

Apart from some CB shoots, there was little activity through the winter months. In February 1918 the HAGs became permanent RGA brigades: 24th Bde consisted of one heavy battery (1/1st Warwickshire Bty) and three other 6-inch howitzer siege batteries (105th, 229th and 247th) in addition to the 172nd.

At the end of March 1918, 105th Siege Bty moved to a position south of the Asiago plateau supporting VIII Italian Corps. The gunsites were in wooded mountainous terrain and the guns had to be manhandled into position. They carried out trench bombardment while awaiting the next Austrian offensive (the Second Battle of the Piave River). This finally came on 15 June. Despite some initial Austrian gains, 48th (South Midland) Division held its main positions. The British heavy howitzers systematically destroyed the Austrian guns on the Asiago, notwithstanding poor visibility early on (Royal Air Force observation aircraft were able to direct the fire later) and the Austrian offensive failed all along the front.

Preparations then began for the final battle on the Italian Front, the stunning success of the Battle of Vittorio Veneto. The British were relieved in the Asiago sector and moved to join the British-commanded Tenth Italian Army near Treviso. 24th HAG supported a number of British and French raids during September and October, then on 23 October the preliminary attacks began, supported by 24th HAG's howitzers. The main British assault crossed the River Piave on 27 October, with the heavy guns engaging all known Austrian gun positions and providing a protective barrage on either flank. A bridge was ready by 29 October and the heavy guns crossed the river. By 1 November the Austrian army had collapsed and the pursuing British troops had left their heavy guns far in the rear. Austrian signed the Armistice of Villa Giusti on 3 November, ending the war in Italy.

After the Armistice, 24th HAG was involved in securing prisoners and captured artillery. Demobilisation of the batteries in Italy began at Christmas 1918 and they were disbanded by the end of March 1919.
