= 97th Regiment =

97th Regiment may refer to:

- 97th Regiment of Foot (disambiguation), British Army regiments
- 97th (The London Scottish) Heavy Anti-Aircraft Regiment, Royal Artillery
- 97th Deccan Infantry, British Indian Army

== American Civil War regiments ==
- 97th Illinois Infantry Regiment
- 97th Indiana Infantry Regiment
- 97th New York Infantry Regiment
- 97th Ohio Infantry Regiment
- 97th Pennsylvania Infantry Regiment
- 97th United States Colored Infantry Regiment

== See also ==
- 97th Brigade (disambiguation)
- 97th Division (disambiguation)
