= LXXXXVII Corps =

LXXXXVII Corps, XCVII Corps, or 97th Corps may refer to:

- LXXXXVII Army Corps, Wehrmacht, Germany
- 97th (Glasgow Guards) Lanarkshire Rifle Volunteer Corps, United Kingdom

== See also ==
- List of military corps by number
- 97th Brigade (disambiguation)
- 97th Division (disambiguation)
- 97th Regiment (disambiguation)
- 97th (disambiguation)
