= 97th =

97th is the ordinal form of the number 97. 97th or Ninety-seventh may also refer to:

- A fraction, 1/97, equal to one of 97 equal parts

== Geography ==
- 97th meridian east, a line of longitude
- 97th meridian west, a line of longitude
- 97th Street (Manhattan)

== Military ==
- 97th Brigade (disambiguation)
- 97th Division (disambiguation)

== Other ==
- 97th century
- 97th century BC

== See also ==
- April 7, 97th day of the year in a standard year
- 97 (disambiguation)
