= 97 =

97 may refer to:

- 97 (number), the natural number following 96 and preceding 98
- one of the years 97 BC, AD 97, 1997, 2097, etc.
- "97", song from the compilation album Alkaline Trio (2002) by American punk rock band Alkaline Trio
- "97", song from the album Scarlet (2023) by American rapper Doja Cat

== Other uses ==
- 97 Klotho, a main-belt asteroid
- Tatra 97, a fastback sedan
- Hot 97, a radio station in New York City

== See also ==
- Berkelium (atomic number), a chemical element
- 97th (disambiguation)
- List of highways numbered 97
- Hillsborough disaster
