= 146th Heavy Anti-Aircraft Regiment, Royal Artillery =

British air defence unit in World War II

146th Heavy Anti-Aircraft Regiment, RA
- Royal Artillery cap badge
- Active: 26 January 1942–30 October 1945
- Country: United Kingdom
- Branch: British Army
- Role: Air defence
- Size: Regiment
- Part of: Anti-Aircraft Command; 21st Army Group
- Engagements: Normandy campaign Defence of Ostend

146th Heavy Anti-Aircraft Regiment was an air defence unit of Britain's Royal Artillery during World War II. After defending the UK against air attack as part of Anti-Aircraft Command, it went to Normandy shortly after D Day to defend the important fuel installations at Port-en-Bessin. Later in the campaign it moved to defend the port of Ostend.

== Organisation ==
146th Heavy Anti-Aircraft Regiment (HAA Rgt) was formed during a period of rapid expansion of Anti-Aircraft Command, utilising batteries drawn from existing regiments. Regimental Headquarters (RHQ) was established on 26 January 1942 at Jesmond, Newcastle upon Tyne, and during February the following batteries were regimented with it:

- 176 (County of Durham) HAA Battery joined from 63rd (Northumbrian) HAA Rgt on 1 February
- 339 HAA Battery joined from 110th HAA Rgt on 23 February
- 414 HAA Battery joined from 64th (Northumbrian) HAA Rgt on 1 February
- 465 HAA Battery joined from 65th (The Manchester Regiment) HAA Rgt on 1 February

== Home defence ==
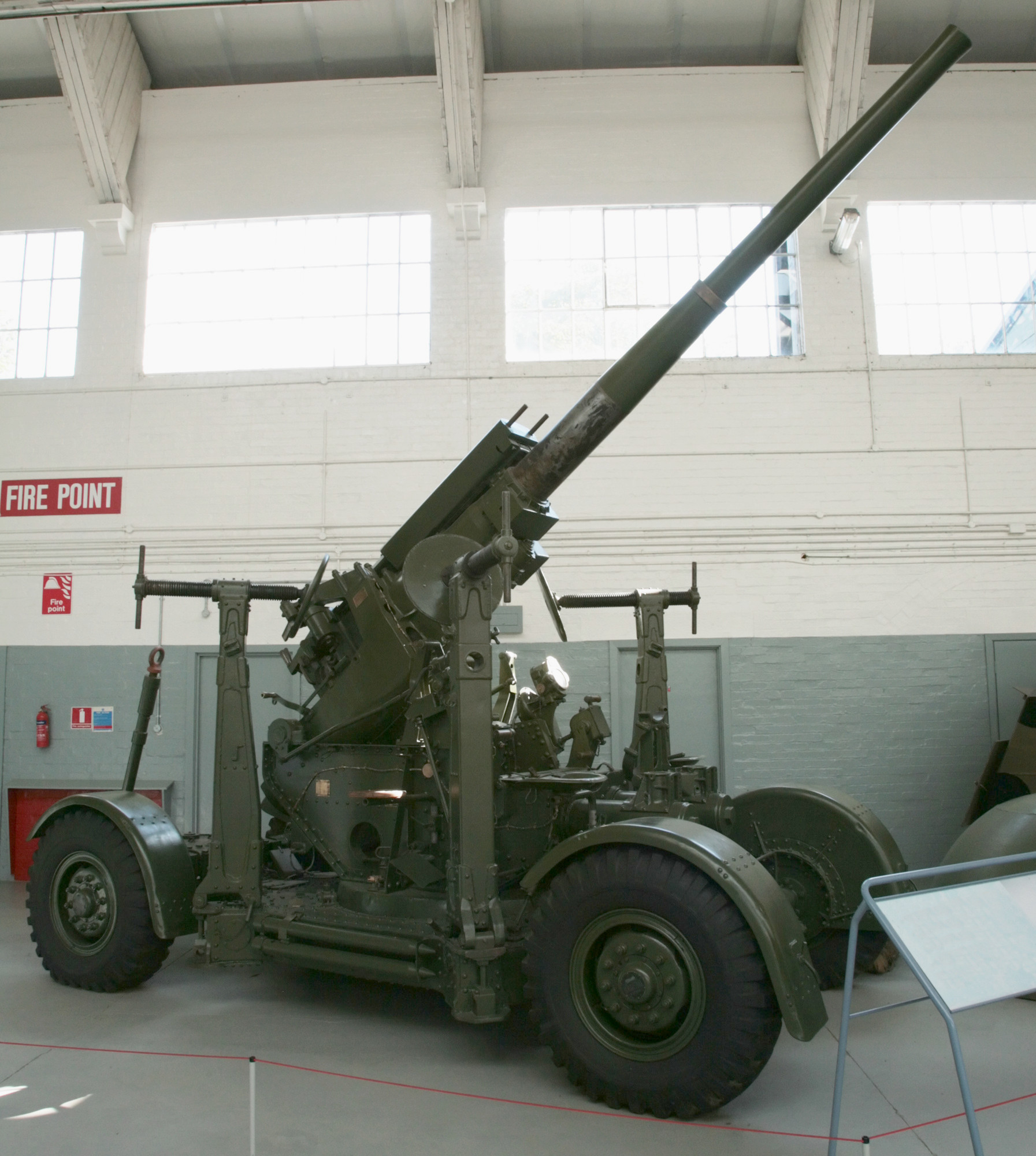
3.7-inch HAA gun preserved at Imperial War Museum Duxford.

The new regiment formed part of 30th (Northumbrian) Anti-Aircraft Brigade defending Newcastle and Sunderland in 7th AA Division, but initially 339 HAA Bty was attached to 12th AA Division in the West of Scotland, and 414 HAA Bty to 45 AA Brigade in South Wales. Before the end of May the whole regiment had concentrated in 5th AA Division, first under 47 AA Bde covering Southampton, then under 35 AA Bde in Portsmouth. Because of Luftwaffe 'hit-and-run' raids along the South Coast, there was considerable reorganisation of AA formations in the area during the summer of 1942. In September the regiment moved to 27 (Home Counties) AA Bde, still in the Portsmouth area. On 3 October, 339 HAA Bty transferred to 173rd HAA Rgt.

In November 1942 the regiment switched command again, this time to 5 AA Bde, which had air defence commitments in Southern England but had a high turnover of units, many of which were under training for deployment overseas. In May 1943 it was 146th HAA Rgt's turn: it left 5 AA Bde and had left AA Command altogether and joined the field forces before the end of the month. It was joined by 598 HAA Bty and a Troop of 600 HAA Bty from 177th HAA Rgt on 19 July 1943.

== Operation Overlord ==
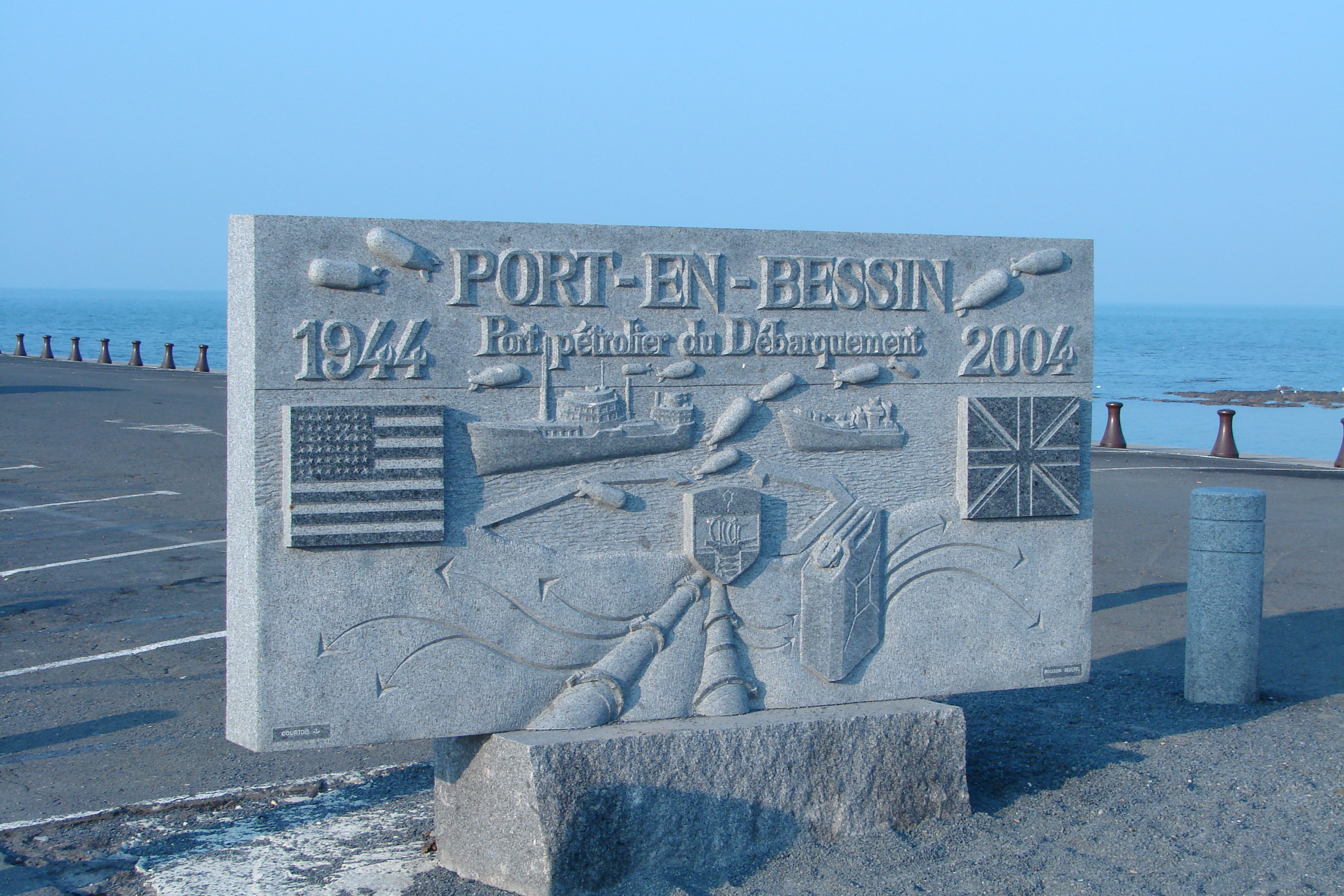
Memorial at Port-en-Bessin to the wartime fuel facilities, including barrage balloon defences.

In April 1944, 146th HAA Rgt joined 76 AA Bde, one of the formations preparing for the Allied invasion of Normandy, Operation Overlord. 598 HAA Bty and the Trp of 600 Bty left to rejoin 177th HAA Rgt on 5 May 1944, reducing 146th HAA Rgt to the three-battery establishment (176, 414, 465) for overseas service. Units of 76 AA Bde landed with the assault waves on Gold Beach on D Day and then established AA defences over the beachhead. 146th HAA Regiment was given a follow-up role in the brigade's planning, with its batteries due to arrive on 11–13 June (D + 5 to D +7). In the event the first elements of 176 Bty reported to Brigade HQ at 14.30 on 12 June (D + 6). 414 and 465 Btys (less one Troop still on the road and the Royal Electrical and Mechanical Engineers' workshop, which arrived on 16 June) had arrived by 11.00 next day and were ready for action before the end of the day.

146th HAA Regiment's task was to protect the British and US installations at Port-en-Bessin, where petrol storage depots were being built, fed by 'Tombola' buoyed pipelines from tankers moored offshore. (Note: This was the predecessor to the better-known 'Pluto' pipelines under the English Channel.) The regiment's commanding officer, Lieutenant-Colonel A. Key, acted as AA Defence Commander (AADC) for Port-en-Bessin and as the brigade's liaison officer with the neighbouring US forces. The regiment established a sub-AA Operations Room (AAOR), and had 418 and 419 Btys of 125th Light AA Rgt under its command, while its own 414 HAA Bty was under operational command of 112th HAA Rgt. Further protection for the little port and its vital installations was provided by 139th LAA Rgt on barges, Royal Air Force Barrage balloons, and Pioneer Corps companies operating smoke generators onshore and aboard Royal Navy trawlers. The HAA batteries were also given the secondary role of providing ground fire in support of XXX Corps.

At Port-en-Bessin, the 3.7-inch guns of 146th HAA and Bofors 40 mm guns of 139th LAA Rgt were in action for 33 consecutive nights against high- and low-level bombing, employing visual, radar and barrage methods. The HAA guns fired 5563 rounds, scoring 11 'kills'. A subsidiary task was to establish radar stations on the cliffs above Arromanches and Port-en-Bessin using their Gun-laying radar to track Luftwaffe minelaying aircraft and plot the fall of the Parachute mines so that they could be cleared by the Royal Navy.

== Ostend ==
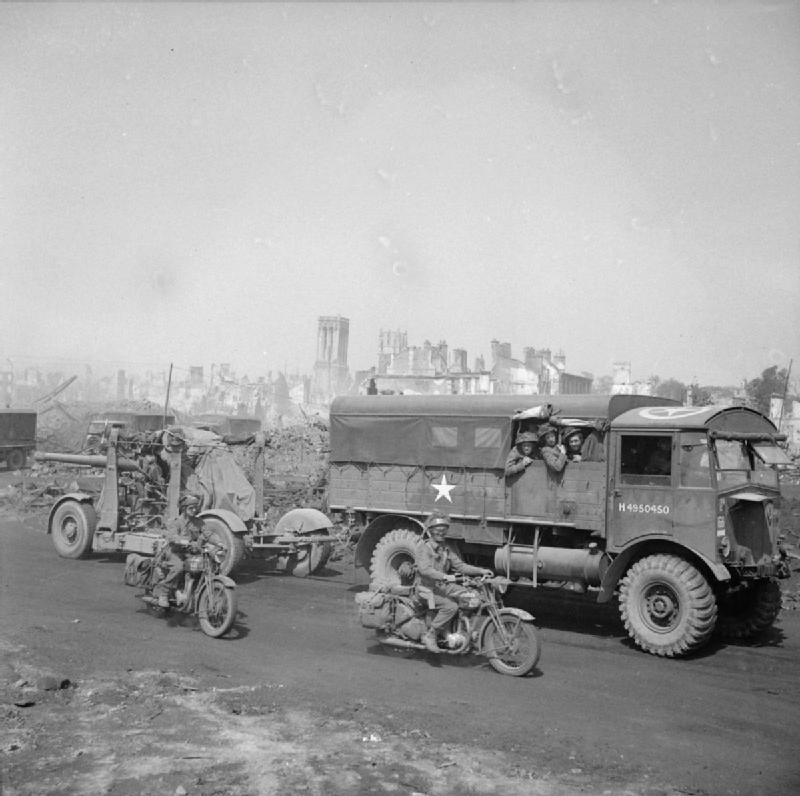
AEC Matador gun tractor tows a 3.7-inch HAA gun through the ruins of Caen, August 1944.

Once the Allies had achieved a breakout from the Normandy beachhead in mid-August, 76 AA Bde prepared to move up in support, handing over its responsibilities, including Port-en-Bessin, and moving to Dieppe on 3 September. 146th HAA Regiment deployed at Dieppe, with Lt-Col Key acting as AADC once more. 76 AA Brigade HQ then moved on to Antwerp while 80 AA Bde HQ came up from the Seine to take over at Dieppe on 11 September, including command of 146th HAA Rgt. However, First Canadian Army's advance along the Belgian coast was proceeding rapidly, and on 14 September 146th HAA Rgt was ordered to move up to Ostend, which had just been liberated.

At Ostend the regiment came under the command of 75 AA Bde, which had been moved up from Normandy to take over both AA and coast defence for the port. The re-opened harbour became an important supply point for stores and bulk petrol for 21st Army Group, the first tankers berthing on 30 September. Five HAA and two, later three, LAA regiments were devoted to its defence. 146th HAA Regiment also contributed a troop (4 guns) of its 3.7-inch guns to the coast defence role. There was no enemy air activity in the area at this stage of the campaign, but enemy torpedo boats attacked shipping in the anchorage.

By November the LAA allocation to Ostend had been scaled back, but the HAA guns remained in place. Then the Germans launched their Ardennes offensive against the First US Army on 16 December, accompanied by major air strikes right across the Allies' front. These strikes extended as far as Ostend on 26 December when some 60 German aircraft made random attacks in mist and cloud. The early warning and reporting arrangements failed, and only two aircraft were shot down. The climax came on 1 January 1945 (Operation Bodenplatte) when over 900 fighters and fighter-bombers made surprise attacks on Allied airfields, including those close to Ostend. Despite the damage inflicted on the airfields, a high proportion of the attackers were shot down by fighters and AA guns.

In January 1945, 5 Royal Marines AA Bde took charge of Ostend while 75 AA Bde moved to defend the Breskens–Zeebrugge channel leading to the Scheldt estuary and the port of Antwerp. 75 AA Brigade borrowed some troops of HAA guns from the regiments at Ostend to thicken up its defences against mine-laying aircraft, which were active up until 23 January.

== Disbandment ==
With the war in Europe rapidly coming to an end after the crossing of the Rhine in March, 21st Army Group began to reorganise its surplus AA troops as infantry, garrison or transport troops. On 16 April 146th HAA Rgt was moved up to the Scheldt to rejoin 76 AA Bde, taking over gunsites from one of the HAA regiments that was converting. Next day the regiment received warning orders to be ready to move to 80 AA Bde and itself convert to garrison troops on the River Maas. It ceased fire on 19 April, but the warning order was cancelled the next day. As 76 AA Bde's war diary commented, 'It is most exasperating for the Regt to be left high and dry with no orders for its future employment'. On 27 Apr 1945, 146th HAA Rgt regiment was listed as one of several AA units still awaiting re-employment or disbandment, but the next day it left for its new duties. RHQ with the three batteries formally disbanded on 30 October 1945.
