= 35th Anti-Aircraft Brigade =

35th Anti-Aircraft Brigade 61 Anti-Aircraft Brigade
- Active: 1 April 1938 – 1 June 1948
- Country: United Kingdom
- Branch: Territorial Army
- Type: Anti-Aircraft Brigade
- Role: Air Defence
- Part of: 5th AA Division; 2 AA Group; 6 AA Group
- Garrison/HQ: Fareham
- Engagements: The Blitz

35th Anti-Aircraft Brigade was an air defence formation of Anti-Aircraft Command in the British Territorial Army (TA) formed shortly before the outbreak of the Second World War. It defended the important naval base of Portsmouth during The Blitz.

== Origins ==
35th Anti-Aircraft (AA) Brigade was formed on 1 April 1938 at Fort Fareham in Hampshire, and was commanded by Brigadier R.B. Purey Cust (appointed 16 May 1938). It was assigned to 5th AA Division when that formation was created on 1 September 1938.

=== Mobilisation ===
The TA's AA units were mobilised on 23 September 1938 during the Munich Crisis, units manning their emergency positions within 24 hours, even though many did not yet have their full complement of men or equipment. The emergency lasted three weeks, and they were stood down on 13 October. In February 1939 the existing AA defences came under the control of a new Anti-Aircraft Command. In June a partial mobilisation of TA units was begun in a process known as 'couverture', whereby each AA unit did a month's tour of duty in rotation to man selected AA and searchlight positions. On 24 August, ahead of the declaration of war, AA Command was fully mobilised at its war stations.

=== Order of battle 1939 ===
On the outbreak of the Second World War, 35 AA Brigade comprised the following units of the Royal Artillery (RA) and Royal Engineers (RE):

- 56th (Cornwall) Anti-Aircraft Regiment, RA
  - HQ at Falmouth
  - 165th (Cornwall) Anti-Aircraft Battery at Redruth
  - 201st (Cornwall) Anti-Aircraft Battery at Padstow
  - 202nd (Cornwall) Anti-Aircraft Battery at Par
  - 203rd (Cornwall) Anti-Aircraft Battery at Penzance
- 57th (Wessex) Anti-Aircraft Regiment, RA
  - HQ at Portsmouth
  - 213th (Portsmouth) Anti-Aircraft Battery
  - 214th (Southsea) Anti-Aircraft Battery
  - 215th (Gosport & Fareham) Anti-Aircraft Battery
  - 216th (Isle of Wight & Cosham)) Anti-Aircraft Battery
- 72nd (Hampshire) Anti-Aircraft Regiment, RA – Heavy AA unit formed in 1938 by conversion of 95th (Hampshire) Field Brigade, RA
  - HQ at Southampton
  - 217th (Hampshire Carabiniers) Anti-Aircraft Battery at Winchester
  - 218th (Hampshire Royal Horse Artillery) Anti-Aircraft Battery at Southampton
  - 310th Anti-Aircraft Battery – formed January 1939 at Parkstone, Dorset
- 48th (Hampshire) Anti-Aircraft Battalion, RE – searchlight regiment organised in 1937 from Hampshire Fortress Engineers, RE
  - HQ at Portsmouth
  - 391st Anti-Aircraft Company at Portsmouth
  - 392nd Anti-Aircraft Company at East Cowes, Isle of Wight
  - 393rd Anti-Aircraft Company at Gosport
  - 394th Anti-Aircraft Company at Southampton
- 35th Anti-Aircraft Brigade Company, Royal Army Service Corps

Together with the searchlights of 27th (Home Counties) Anti-Aircraft Brigade, 35 AA Bde was responsible for the air defence of the city and naval base of Portsmouth. In September 1939, the brigade had 29 heavy AA guns round Portsmouth. During 1940 the AA regiments of the RA were designated 'Heavy AA', and the RE units transferred to the RA as 'Searchlight Regiments'. By July 1940 there were 44 HAA guns deployed round Portsmouth.

== Battle of Britain and Blitz ==
The brigade was heavily engaged throughout the Battle of Britain. A few bombers got through to Portsmouth on 10 July, and the Portsmouth and Southampton AA guns were in action on 15 August, claiming one 'kill', Again, on 18 August, German air raids crossed Southern England and appeared over RAF airfields at West Malling, Manston, Kenley, Biggin Hill, Gravesend and the town of Sevenoaks, all within four and a half hours in the afternoon. The guns of 35 AA Bde and its neighbours were in action and accounted for 23 enemy aircraft. On 24 August a raid eluded RAF Fighter Command's fighters and bombed the city and dockyard badly, killing over 100 people despite the efforts of the AA guns, although another raid two days later was driven off by fighters and AA fire, and only dropped a few bombs on the outskirts of the city. This was the start of the Portsmouth Blitz).

After 15 September, the intensity of Luftwaffe daylight attacks fell, and the emphasis switched to night bombing of industrial towns (the Blitz). Portsmouth was a major target: during a succession of attacks, two bombs fell on a gun position of 35 AA Bde, killing an officer and 10 men, wrecking the command post and one gun. Two of the remaining guns continued to fire by improvised methods. The city was badly bombed on the nights of 5 December 1940, 10 January, 10 March, 17 and 27 April 1941.

=== Order of Battle 1940–41 ===
During the Blitz, 35 AA Bde had the following composition:

- 72 HAA Rgt RA – as above
- 48 S/L Rgt RA – as above
- 80th (Berkshire) Heavy Anti-Aircraft Regiment, Royal Artillery - formed in 1938 by expansion of 264th (Berkshire) Field Battery of 66th (South Midland) Field Brigade, RA
  - HQ at Reading, Berkshire
  - 249 (Berkshire Royal Horse Artillery) at Reading
  - 250 (Reading) at Reading
  - 251 (Buckinghamshire) at Slough
  - 252 (City of Oxford) at Oxford
- 118th Heavy Anti-Aircraft Regiment, Royal Artillery – new regiment formed in December 1940

== Mid-War ==
5 AA Divisional sign, worn 1940–42

The Blitz ended in May 1941, but there were occasional raids thereafter and AA Command continued to strengthen its defences. Newly-formed units joining AA Command were increasingly 'mixed' ones into which women of the Auxiliary Territorial Service were integrated, while those armed with Z Battery rocket projectiles were partly manned by members of the Home Guard. At the same time, experienced units were posted away for service overseas. This led to a continual turnover of units, which accelerated in 1942 with the preparations for Operation Torch. The AA defences of Southern England were severely tested in the summer of 1942 by the Luftwaffe's 'hit-and-run' attacks along the South Coast, and there was much reorganisation, accounting for some of the turnover of units listed earlier. LAA units waiting to go overseas were sometimes lent back to AA Command to deal with the hit-and-run raiders.

=== Order of Battle 1941–42 ===
Over the two years following the Blitz, the brigade had the following changes in composition:

- 54th (City of London) HAA Rgt – joined from 1 AA Division autumn 1941; returned to 1 AA Division February 1942
  - 160, 161, 312 HAA Btys
  - 428 Bty – transferred to 131st HAA Rgt December 1941
- 57th (Wessex) HAA Rgt – left for 1 AA Division autumn 1941
  - 213, 214, 215 HAA Btys
  - 219 HAA Bty – attached to 27 AA Bde from May 1941; transferred to new 124th HAA Rgt summer 1941
  - 430 HAA Bty – joined summer 1941
- 72nd (Hampshire) HAA Rgt – left for 6 AA Division December 1941
  - 217, 218, 393 HAA Btys
  - 310 HAA Bty – transferred to new 131st HAA Rgt August 1941
- 80th (Berkshire) HAA Rgt – left AA Command July 1941; later went to North Africa
  - 250 HAA Bty – attached to 65 AA Bde
  - 251, 252 HAA Btys
- 97th (London Scottish) HAA Rgt – joined from 1 AA Division March 1942; to 5 AA Bde June 1942
  - 298, 319 HAA Btys
  - 299, 376 HAA Btys – attached to 1 AA Division

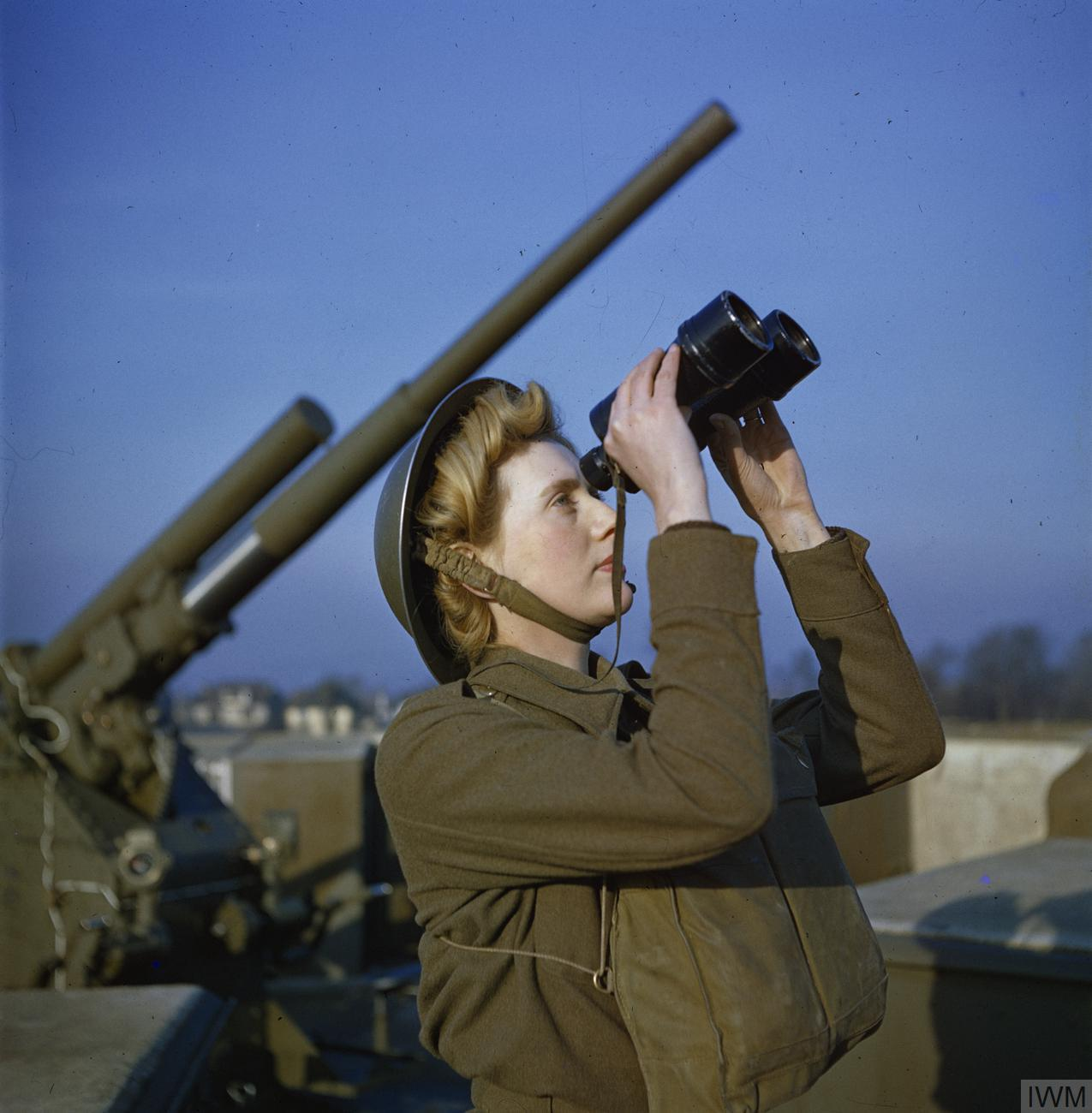
An ATS spotter at a 3.7-inch AA gun site, December 1942

- 101st HAA Rgt – joined from 6 AA Division July 1942; left for 1 AA Division August 1942
    - 226, 297, 379, 427 HAA Btys
- 104th HAA Rgt – joined from 8 AA Division December 1941, left for 6 AA Division April 1942
  - 328, 329, 336, 452 HAA Btys
- 107th HAA Rgt – from 27 AA Bde June 1942; left for 5 AA Bde November 1942
  - 334, 335, 337 HAA Btys
  - 390 HAA Bty – left August 1942
- 124th HAA Rgt – new unit formed March 1941; left for 27 AA Bde autumn 1941
  - 219 HAA Bty – joined from 57th (Wessex) HAA Rgt summer 1941
  - 410 HAA Bty – attached to 9 AA Division until July 1941
  - 412 HAA Bty
  - 415 HAA Bty – attached to 27 AA Bde until May 1941
- 126th HAA Rgt – new unit formed July 1941; left for 12 AA Division July 1942
  - 423, 425, 426 HAA Btys
  - 431 HAA Bty – joined from 102nd HAA Rgt July 1942
- 131st HAA Rgt – new unit formed August 1941; left for 6 AA Division July 1942
  - 310 HAA Bty – transferred from 72nd HAA Rgt
  - 368 HAA Bty – transferred from 116th HAA Rgt; attached to 8 AA Division
  - 376 HAA Bty– transferred from 97th (London Scottish) HAA Rgt July 1942
  - 428 HAA Bty – transferred from 54th HAA Rgt December 1941
  - 458 HAA Bty – transferred to new 160th (Mixed) HAA Rgt August 1942
- 146th HAA Rgt – new unit formed January 1942; left for 27 AA Bde autumn 1941
  - 176, 339, 414, 465 HAA Btys
- 148th (Mixed) HAA Rgt – new unit formed February 1942; to 5 AA Bde June, returned November 1942
  - 505 (M) HAA Bty – transferred to new 157th (M) HAA Rgt May 1942
  - 508, 523 (M) HAA Btys
  - 529 (M) HAA Bty – joined June 1942
- 151st (Mixed) HAA Rgt – from 4 AA Division July 1942
  - 510, 511, 514, 516 (M) HAA Btys
- 157th (Mixed) HAA Rgt – new unit formed May 1942
  - 539, 550, 551 (M) HAA Btys
- 160th (Mixed) HAA Rgt – new unit formed June 1942
  - 458 (M) HAA Bty – transferred from 131st HAA Rgt
  - 556 (M) HAA Bty
  - 508, 523, 529 (M) HAA Btys – transferred from 148th HAA Rgt Spring 1943
- 101st (King's Regiment (Liverpool)) LAA Rgt – joined July 1942; left AA Command for Middle East Forces by October 1942
  - 226, 297, 379 LAA Btys
- 48th (Hampshire) S/L Rgt – from 47 AA Bde August 1942; returned to 47 AA Bde November 1942
  - 391, 392, 393, 394 S/L Btys
- 5th AA 'Z' Rgt
  - 102, 114 Z Btys
  - 112, 127 Z Btys – joined May 1941
- 35 AA Bde Signal Office Mixed Sub-Section (part of No 2 Company, 5 AA Division Mixed Signal Unit, Royal Corps of Signals)

=== Order of Battle 1942–43 ===
The AA Divisions were disbanded on 30 September and replaced by new AA Groups that corresponded with the groups of RAF Fighter Command. 35 AA Brigade joined the new 2 AA Group covering South East England. After this major reorganisation, the brigade settled down with the following composition (temporary attachments omitted):

- 82nd (Essex) HAA Rgt – returned from Gibraltar May 1943
  - 156, 193, 256 HAA Btys
  - 228 (Edinburgh) HAA Bty – rejoined from Gibraltar October 1943
- 127th HAA Rgt – temporarily attached on two occasions 1942–3
  - 411, 422, 433 HAA Btys
- 148th (M) HAA Rgt – left for 1 AA Group April 1943
  - 624, 628, 629 (M) HAA Btys
- 154th (M) HAA Rgt – transferred from 4 AA Group October 1943
  - 522, 526, 552, 560 (M) HAA Btys
- 157th (M) HAA Rgt – left for 4 AA Group October 1943
  - 505 (M) HAA Bty – transferred from 148th (M) HAA Rgt early 1943
  - 539, 551 (M) HAA Btys
  - 550 (M) HAA Bty – transferred from 154th (M) HAA Rgt early 1943
- 160th (M) HAA Rgt
  - 458, 556 (M) HAA Btys
  - 508, 523, 529 (M) HAA Btys – transferred from 148th (M) HAA Rgt early 1943
- 176th HAA Rgt – transferred from 3 AA Group May 1943; to 21st Army Group by July 1943
  - 595, 597, 599 HAA Btys
- 177th HAA Rgt – new unit formed November 1942; left unbrigaded May 1943
  - 596, 598, 600 HAA Btys
- 190th (M) HAA Rgt – new unit formed January, joined May; left for 4 AA Group before August 1943
  - 596, 598, 600 (M) HAA Btys

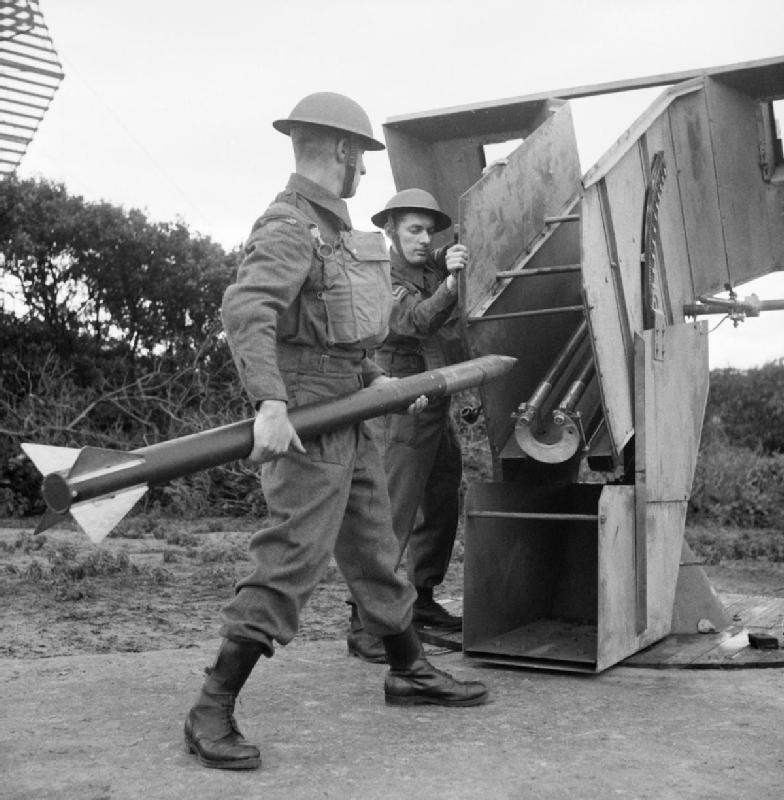
Home Guard soldiers load a single launcher on a static 'Z' Battery, July 1942

- 3rd LAA Rgt – returned from Gibraltar October 1943
  - 9, 114, 126 LAA Btys
- 31st LAA Rgt – lent from GHQ Reserve April 1943; to Operation Husky May 1943
  - 61, 101, 224 LAA Btys
- 84th LAA Rgt – transferred from 5 AA Bde November 1942; left for 38 AA Bde April 1943
  - 201, 461 LAA Btys – attached to 5 AA Bde
  - 251, 448 LAA Btys
- 97tg LAA Rgt – transferred from 47 AA Bde summer 1943
  - 221, 232, 301, 480 LAA Btys
- 140th LAA Rgt – transferred from 72 AA Bde May 1943; left for 5 AA Group before August 1943
  - 367, 457, 459, 464 LAA Btys
- 151st LAA Rgt – new unit converted from 114 HAA Rgt May 1943
  - 449, 472, 478 LAA Btys
- 5th (M) AA 'Z' Rgt
  - 102, 112, 114, 127 (M) Z Btys
  - 194, 198 (M) Z Btys – joined January, left October 1943
- 35 AA Bde Signal Office Mixed Sub-Section (part of 4 Mixed Signal Company, 2 AA Group Signals)

== Late War ==
At the end of 1943, the brigade underwent a major reorganisation, leaving it with just three units (185th (M) HAA Rgt, 3rd LAA Rgt, and 5th AA 'Z' Rgt) and shortly afterwards it came under command of 6 AA Group. This was a headquarters that had been moved from Scotland to the South Coast to take responsibility for the build-up of AA defences in the Solent–Portsmouth area covering embarkation ports for the Allied invasion of Normandy (Operation Overlord). Shipping at Portsmouth was bombed on four successive nights (25–28 April) during the 'Baby Blitz' of early 1944.

=== Order of Battle 1945 ===
35 AA Brigade was soon rejoined by two other regiments that had served briefly with it in the past (127th HAA Rgt and 48th S/L Rgt), and attained the following order of battle:

- 126th HAA Rgt – transferred from 40 AA Bde June; returned July 1944
  - 423, 425, 426, 431 HAA Btys
- 127th HAA Rgt – joined May; to 44 AA Bde June 1944
  - 411, 422, 433 HAA Btys
- 159th (M) HAA Rgt – joined summer 1944
  - 542, 543, 563, 614 (M) HAA Btys
- 185th (M) HAA Rgt
  - 529, 600, 602, 618, 619 (M) HAA Btys
- 3rd LAA Rgt
  - 9, 114, 126 LAA Btys
- 48th (Hampshire) S/L Rgt – joined May; left August 1944
  - 391, 392, 393 S/L Btys
- 5th (M) AA 'Z' Rgt – redesignated 5 AA Area Mixed Rgt April; left May 1944
  - 102, 112, 127 (M) Z Btys

Other units served briefly with the brigade during the summer of 1944, but by October it had returned to simply commanding 159th and 185th HAA and 3rd LAA Rgts. At this time, the brigade's HQ establishment was 9 officers, 8 male other ranks and 25 members of the ATS, together with a small number of attached drivers, cooks and mess orderlies (male and female). In addition, the brigade had a Mixed Signal Office Section of 5 male other ranks and 19 ATS, which was formally part of the Group signal unit.

=== Order of Battle 1945 ===
By this stage of the war, AA Command's strength was diminishing as manpower had to be released to 21st Army Group fighting in North West Europe, and batteries and whole regiments were disbanded or converted other roles. By the end of the year 35 AA Bde was composed as follows:

- 134th (M) HAA Rgt
  - 459, 460, 461, 583 (M) HAA Btys
- 159th (M) HAA Rgt
  - 542, 543 (M) HAA Btys
- 185th (M) HAA Rgt
  - 601, 618
- 3rd LAA Rgt
  - 9, 114, 126 LAA Btys

Shortly afterwards, 6 AA Group was disbanded, and by February 1945, 35 AA Bde had returned to the command of 2 AA Group with just 2nd and 5th AA Area Mixed Rgt HQs under its command (the Home Guard had been stood down and all the Z Btys had disappeared). After VE-Day, the brigade was responsible for 5 and 6 Area AA Maintenance HQs, and for the only fully Mixed searchlight regiments, 26th and 93rd.

== Postwar ==
When the TA was reconstituted on 1 January 1947, 35 AA Bde's Regular Army units reformed 10 AA Bde while the TA portion was renumbered as 61 AA Brigade (TA), (Note: The TA AA brigades were now numbered 51 and upwards, rather than 26 and upwards as in the 1930s; the wartime 61st AA Bde was converted into an infantry brigade in 1945.) both at Fareham. Still forming part of 2 AA Group, 61 AA Bde comprised the following units:

- 393 (Mixed) (Hampshire) HAA Regiment at Southampton – new unit, shortly afterwards renumbered as 675 (M) (Hampshire) HAA Regiment. 'Mixed' indicated that members of the Women's Royal Army Corps were integrated into the unit
- 524 (Bournemouth) Light AA Regiment at Bournemouth
- 535 (Hampshire) LAA Regiment at Eastleigh – reconstituted from 35 LAA Regiment lost at the Fall of Singapore in 1942

However, the brigade was disbanded on 1 June 1948.

== Online sources ==
- British Army units from 1945 on
- British Military History
- Orders of Battle at Patriot Files
- The Royal Artillery 1939–45
- Graham Watson, The Territorial Army 1947
