= 131st Heavy Anti-Aircraft Regiment, Royal Artillery =

131st Heavy Anti-Aircraft Regiment, RA
- Royal Artillery cap badge
- Active: 25 August 1941 – 31 August 1943
- Country: United Kingdom
- Branch: British Army
- Role: Air defence
- Size: Regiment (2–4 batteries)
- Part of: Anti-Aircraft Command
- Engagements: Air defence of the UK

131st Heavy Anti-Aircraft Regiment was an air defence unit of Britain's Royal Artillery formed during World War II. It was organised as the first 'Mixed' regiment in which women of the Auxiliary Territorial Service were integrated into the unit's personnel, though it later reverted to an all-male organisation. It defended the United Kingdom against aerial attack for two years.

== Organisation ==
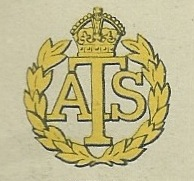
Auxiliary Territorial Service cap badge

By 1941, after two years of war Anti-Aircraft Command, tasked with defending the UK against air attack, was suffering a manpower shortage. In April its commander-in-chief, Lieutenant-General Sir Frederick 'Tim' Pile, proposed to overcome this by utilising the women of the Auxiliary Territorial Service (ATS). The ATS was by law a non-combatant service, but it was decided that Defence Regulations permitted the employment of women in anti-aircraft (AA) roles other than actually firing the guns. They worked the radar and plotting instruments, range-finders and predictors, ran command posts and communications, and carried out many other duties. With the increasing automation of heavy AA (HAA) guns, including gun-laying, fuze-setting and ammunition loading under remote control from the predictor, the question of who actually fired the gun became blurred as the war progressed. The ATS rank and file, if not always their officers, took to the new role with enthusiasm and 'Mixed' batteries and regiments with the ATS supplying two-thirds of their personnel quickly proved a success.

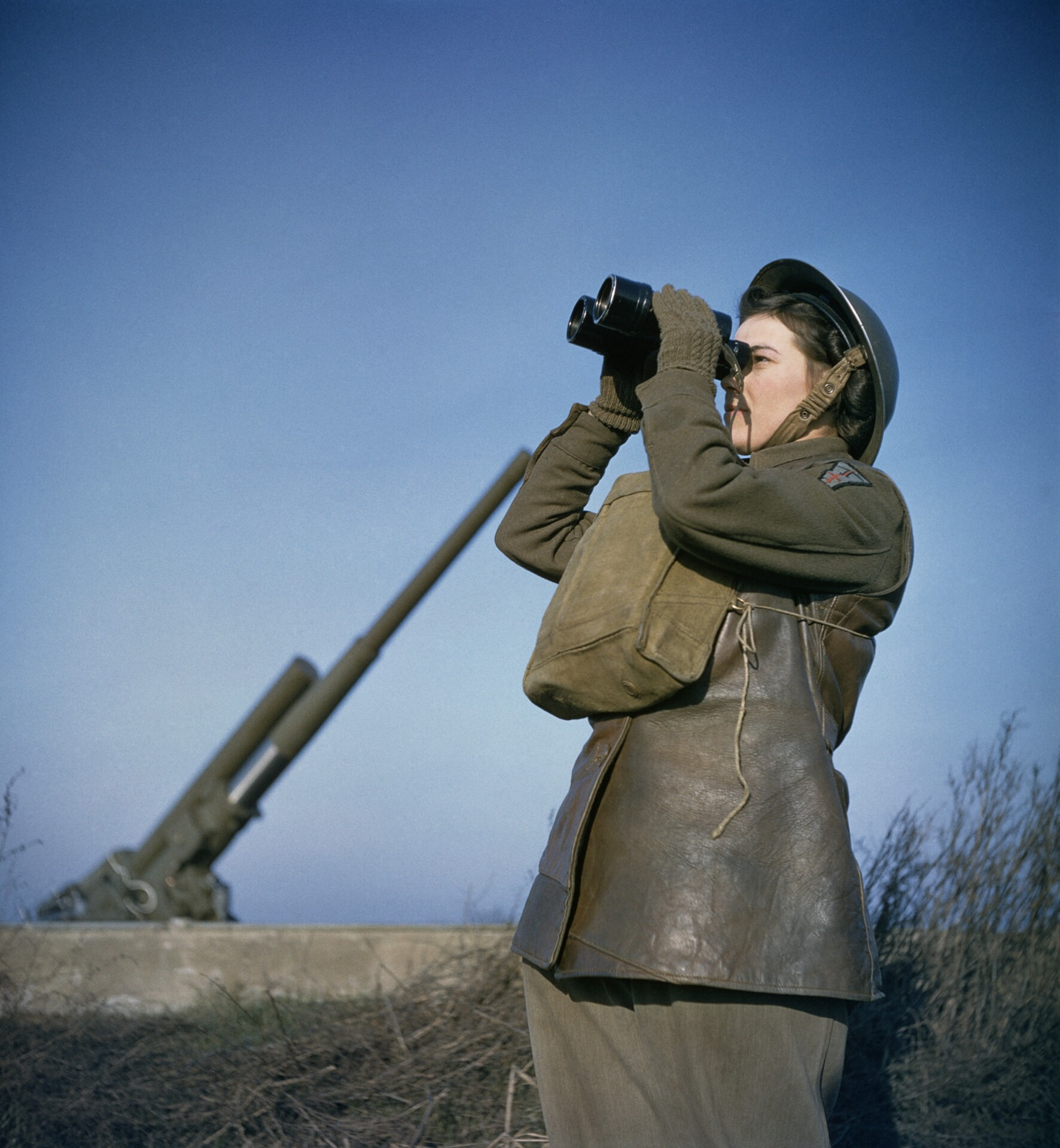
An ATS member of a mixed 3.7-inch HAA gun battery, December 1942, wearing the 1st AA Division shoulder patch.

The first of these new batteries took over an operational gun site in Richmond Park, south-west London, in August 1941, and the first full regiment of converted batteries soon followed: 131st (Mixed) Heavy Anti-Aircraft Regiment, whose regimental headquarters (RHQ) formed at Bitterne, near Southampton, on 25 August. On 4 September it was joined by three existing HAA batteries that had been converted to the Mixed organisation:

- 251 (Buckinghamshire) HAA Bty from 80th (Berkshire) HAA Rgt – left on 7 October and reverted to all-male organisation; later served in West Africa
- 310 (M) HAA Bty, from 72nd (Hampshire) HAA Rgt
- 368 (M) HAA Bty, from 116th HAA Rgt

Following the departure of 251 HAA Bty, 458 HAA Bty (an unmixed unit) joined on 28 October 1941. It served with the regiment until 2 April 1942 when it was reduced to a cadre to form the basis of a mixed battery at 205th HAA Training Rgt, Arborfield, but once it had completed conversion 458 (M) HAA Bty did not return to the regiment and instead joined a new 160th (M) HAA Rgt forming at Fort Fareham, Hampshire. 428 HAA Battery, also all-male, joined 131st (M) HAA Rgt from 54th (City of London) HAA Rgt on 29 December 1941.

131st HAA Regiment supplied a cadre to 207th HAA Training Rgt at Devizes as the basis of a new 520 (M) HAA Bty formed on 15 January 1942; this joined 152nd (M) HAA Rgt.

== Deployment ==
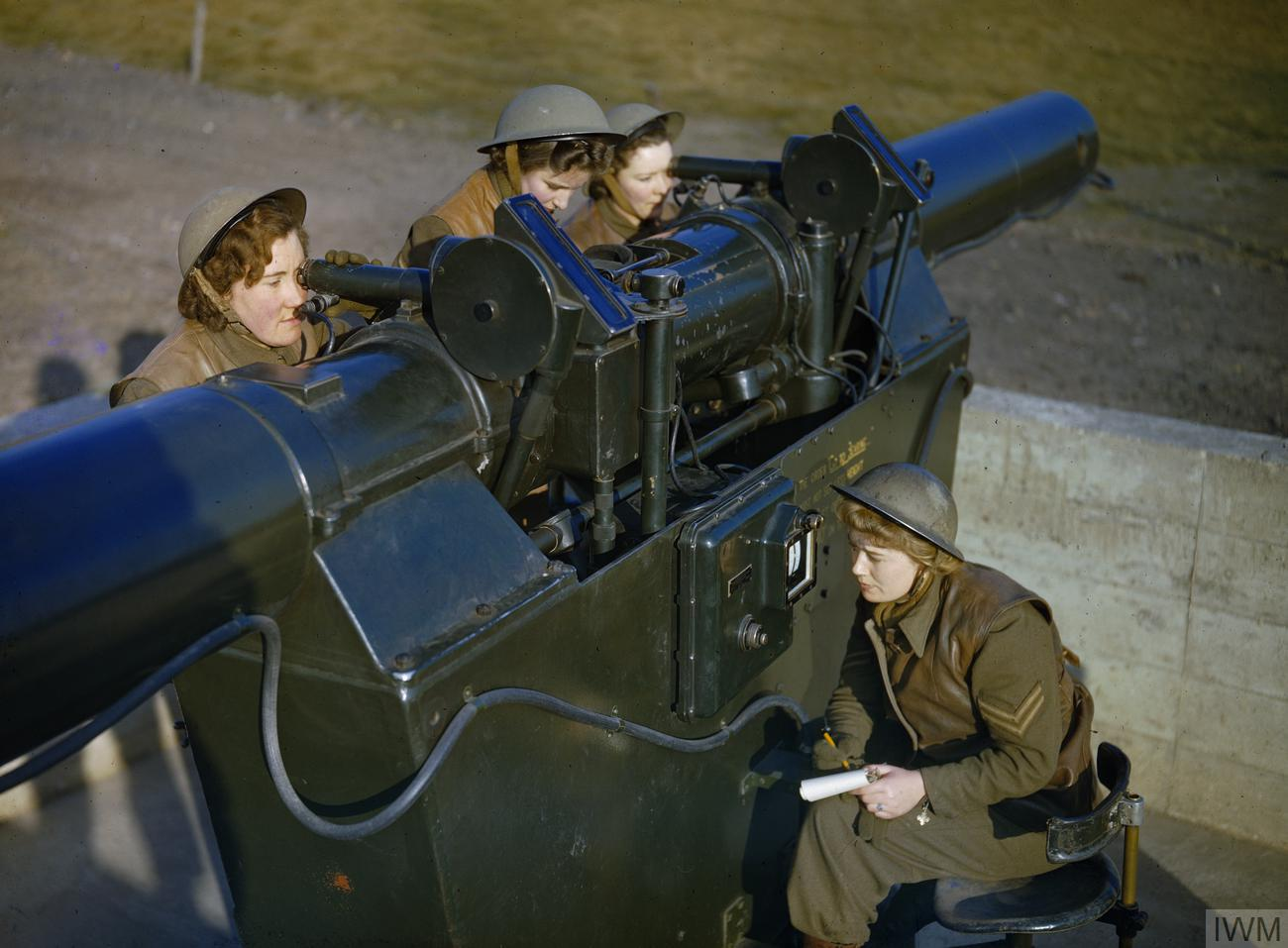
ATS women operating a height and range finder on an HAA gun site, December 1942.

After formation, 131st (M) HAA Rgt was assigned to 35th Anti-Aircraft Brigade, part of 5th Anti-Aircraft Division tasked with defending Southampton and Portsmouth. However, 310 and 368 (M) HAA Btys came under the control of 8th Anti-Aircraft Division defending the area west of Southampton. In late 1941 and early 1942 RHQ only had 428 and 458 HAA Btys under its direct command, and lost its 'Mixed' designation.

The Blitz had ended in May 1941 and there were fewer air raids thereafter. Even during the Baedeker Blitz of 1942, the Luftwaffe avoided heavily defended targets such as Portsmouth and Southampton. Southampton was raided on 17 April and 21 June, Portsmouth on 20 August. After 458 HAA Bty left for conversion, and 428 Bty came under the control of 72nd (Hampshire) HAA Rgt, RHQ had no batteries under its direct command until it was joined on 10 July 1942 by another all-male battery, 376 HAA Bty from 97th (London Scottish) HAA Rgt.

The regiment and its four batteries (310, 368, 376, and 428), now all-male, left for 37 AA Bde in 6th Anti-Aircraft Division in July 1942. 37 AA Brigade operated the 'Thames North' AA layout in Essex, a key part of the AA defences of London against raiders flying up the Thames Estuary; 376 HAA Bty was under the operational command of 71 AA Bde, which was newly forming in 6 AA Division.

However, this deployment did not last long, and in August 1942 the regiment moved again, to 70 AA Bde in 4th Anti-Aircraft Division in North West England, with 376 and 428 HAA Btys attached to 33 (Western) AA Bde in Liverpool, 376 later coming under 44 AA Bde at Manchester.

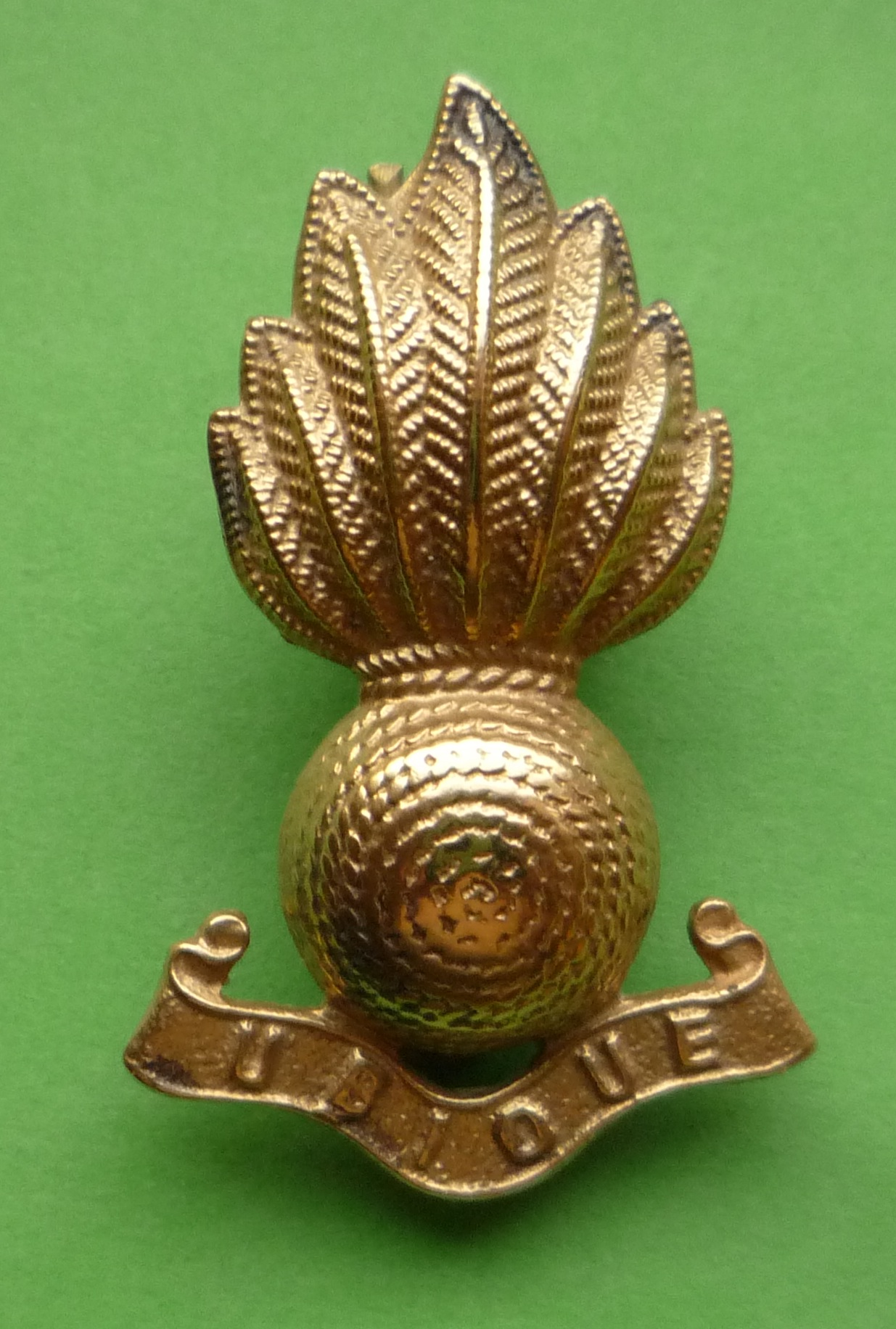
Brass collar badge of the Royal Artillery

In October 1942, 4th AA Division had been replaced by 4 AA Group and by March 1943 the regiment had moved to 53 AA Bde within that group. North West England was hardly threatened by the Luftwaffe by this stage of the war, and AA Command began redeploying its inadequate manpower to other sectors. First 310 and then 428 HAA Btys were attached for a time to 5 AA Group in North East England and then on 3 August 1943 the regiment began to disperse. The four batteries became independent on 6 August and RHQ completed its disbandment by 31 August.

== Insignia ==
While the male members of the regiment wore the Royal Artillery's 'gun' cap badge, the women wore the ATS cap badge, but in addition they wore the RA's 'grenade' collar badge as a special badge above the left breast pocket of the tunic. Both sexes wore the white RA lanyard on the right shoulder.
