= 97th (The London Scottish) Heavy Anti-Aircraft Regiment, Royal Artillery =

97th (London Scottish) HAA Regiment, RA 497 (Hammersmith) HAA Regiment, RA
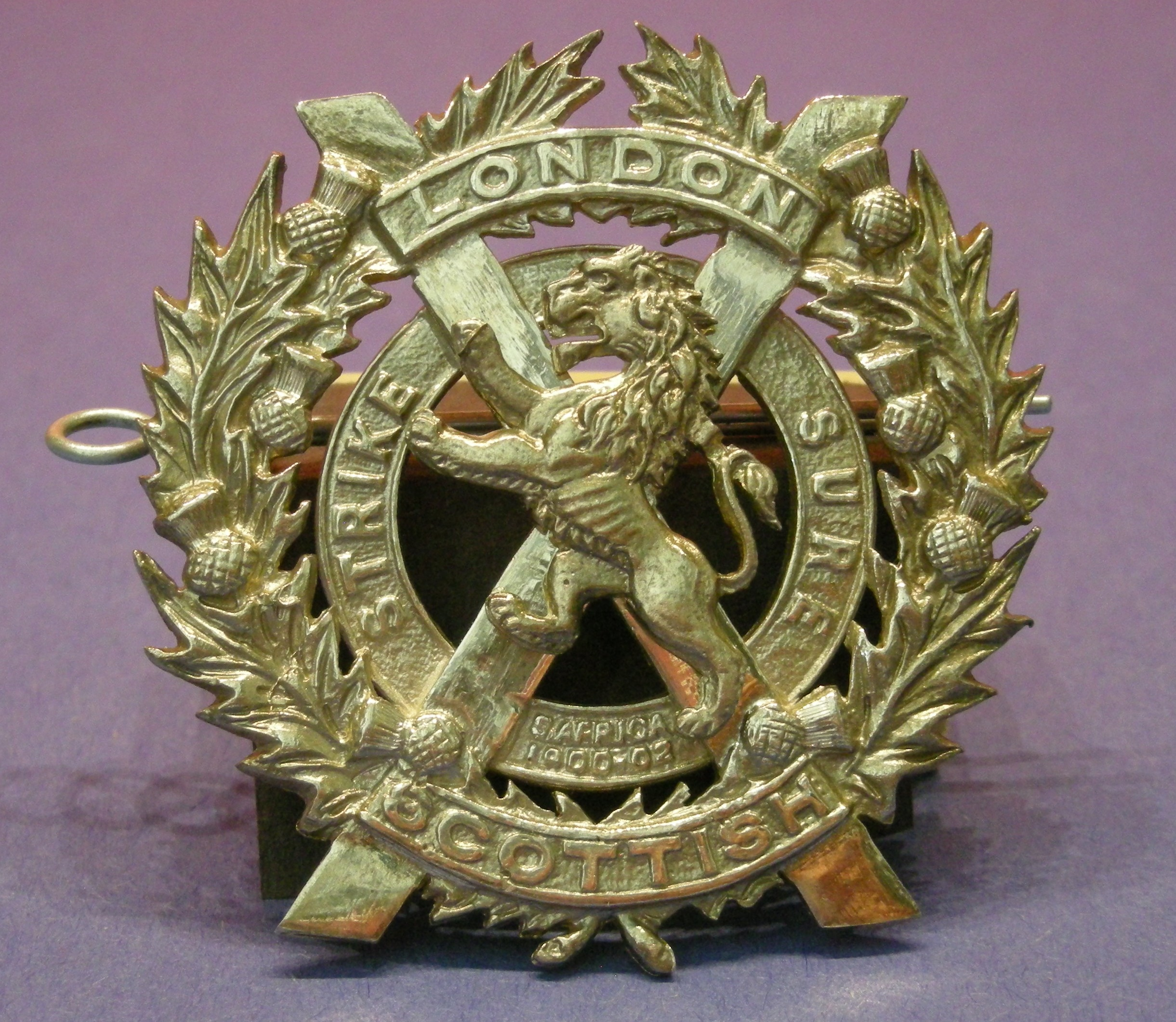
- Cap badge of the London Scottish
- Active: 1 April 1939 – 10 March 1955
- Country: United Kingdom
- Branch: Territorial Army
- Role: Air defence
- Size: Regiment
- Part of: Anti-Aircraft Command; 15th Army Group
- Garrison/HQ: Westminster; Hammersmith
- Engagements: Battle of Britain; The Blitz; Allied invasion of Sicily; Italian Campaign

97th (The London Scottish) Heavy Anti-Aircraft Regiment, Royal Artillery, was an air defence unit of Britain's Territorial Army (TA) formed during the period of international tension leading up to the outbreak of World War II. It was raised as a duplicate battalion by the famous London Scottish Regiment. The unit defended London during The Blitz and then served in Sicily and Italy, both in the anti-aircraft (AA) and medium artillery roles. The regiment continued in the postwar TA until it was amalgamated in 1955.

== Origin ==
When the TA was doubled in size after the Munich Crisis, the London Scottish gained enough recruits to form not one but two additional battalions; the extra battalion was formed as an AA unit. It was organised on 1 April 1939 at the London Scottish Drill Hall at 59 Buckingham Gate, Westminster, with the provisional title of 3rd Battalion, The London Scottish (97th Anti-Aircraft Regiment) and like its parent was a TA unit of the Gordon Highlanders. It consisted of Regimental Headquarters (RHQ) and 298 and 299 AA Batteries.

== World War II ==
=== Mobilisation and Phoney War ===
Cap Badge of the Royal Artillery (pre-1953)

In June 1939, as the international situation worsened, a partial mobilisation of Anti-Aircraft Command's TA units was begun in a process known as 'couverture', whereby each unit did a month's tour of duty in rotation to man selected AA gun positions. On 24 August, ahead of the declaration of war, AA Command was fully mobilised at its war stations. The new regiment mobilised as part of 48 AA Brigade in 1st AA Division defending London. The regiment was embodied in the Royal Artillery (RA) as 97th (The London Scottish) AA Regiment, RA. (Note: Although apparently used, the London Scottish subtitle was not officially authorised until December 1941.)

As the Phoney War continued into 1940, there was little action; however, AA Command's units trained hard while reinforcements and new equipment came in. 97th HAA Regiment formed a new 319 AA Bty within the regiment on 1 April 1940. On 1 June, AA units equipped with 3-inch or heavier guns, including 97th, were designated Heavy AA (HAA) regiments to distinguish them from the new Light AA (LAA) units being formed. By September 1940, 48 AA Bde controlled 28 gunsites (five still unoccupied) to the south and south-east of London as part of the London Inner Artillery Zone (IAZ). Its regiments manned a mixture of static and mobile 3.7-inch and static 4.5-inch guns, but only half the sites yet had GL Mk I gunlaying radar.

=== Battle of Britain and Blitz ===
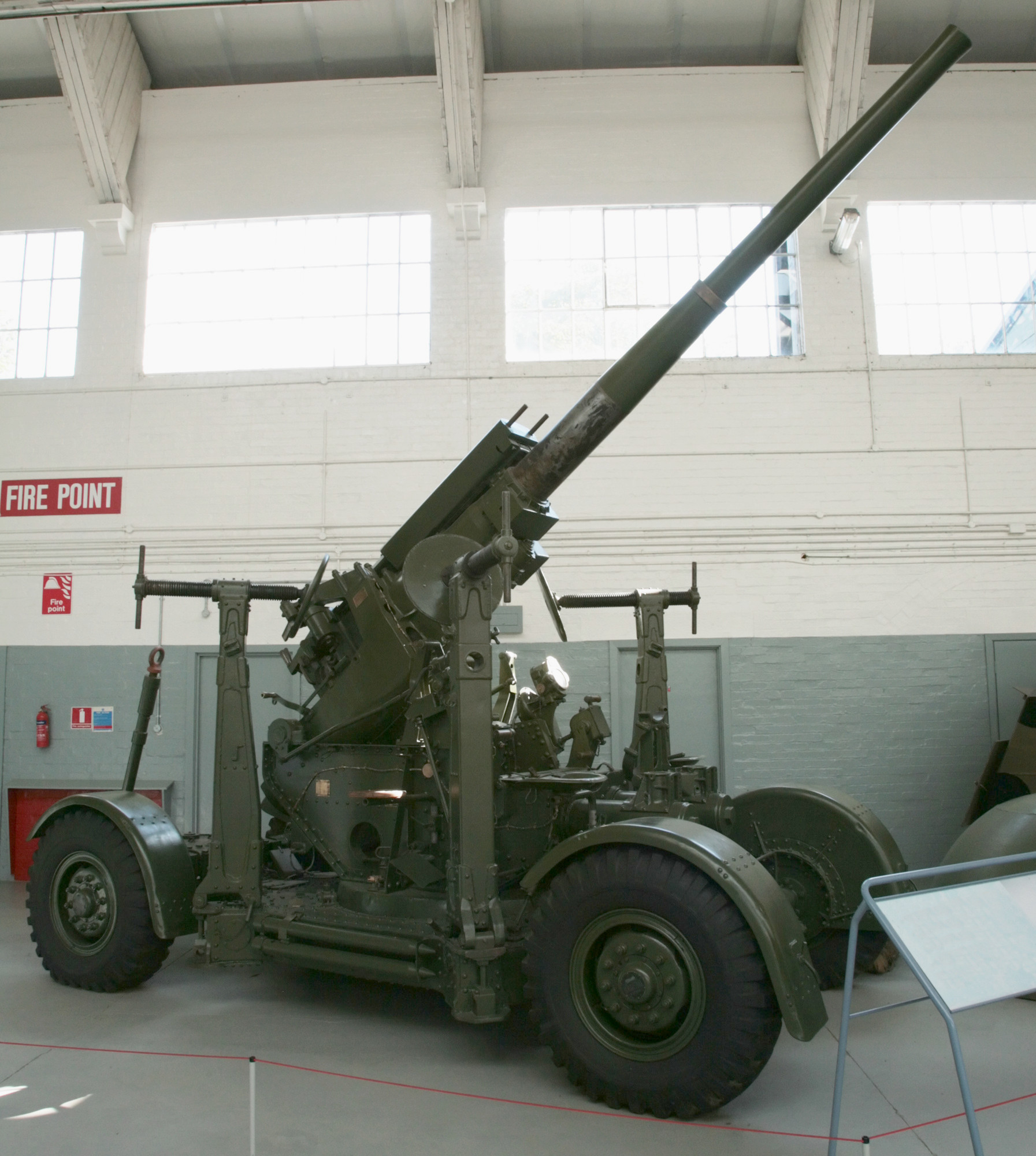
Mobile 3.7-inch HAA gun preserved at Imperial War Museum Duxford.

While the Luftwaffe concentrated on Royal Air Force (RAF) airfields and radar stations in south east England during the Battle of Britain, 48 AA Bde was hardly involved; however, on 1 September, RAF Kenley and RAF Biggin Hill on the outskirts of London were heavily bombed and next day a raid up the Thames Estuary reached the edge of the London IAZ: on both days the raids were engaged by the guns. The docks were again bombed on 7 September, one bomber stream coming in over Surrey and being engaged by 48 AA Bde. This marked a change in tactics by the Luftwaffe and from now on London became the main target, by day and night. On 9 September, an afternoon raid coming in over the South Coast was heavily attacked by the RAF, but some bombers came over Surrey to London to be engaged by 48 AA Bde. By now, the number of HAA guns available in the IAZ had doubled to almost 200. Between 11 and 15 September, massed daylight aids approached London, but running battles with RAF fighters broke up most of the raids before they reached the IAZ. The Battle of Britain had been won, but from now on London would be bombed continuously by night in what became known as The Blitz.

Manning AA positions during the Blitz was dangerous and arduous work. The HAA guns were in action night after night and often during the day as well, as the Luftwaffe directed 71 major raids against London between September 1940 and May 1941. 97th HAA Regiment remained with 48 AA Bde throughout this period, and was strengthened when 376 HAA Bty was formed within the regiment on 15 October 1940.

=== Mid-war ===
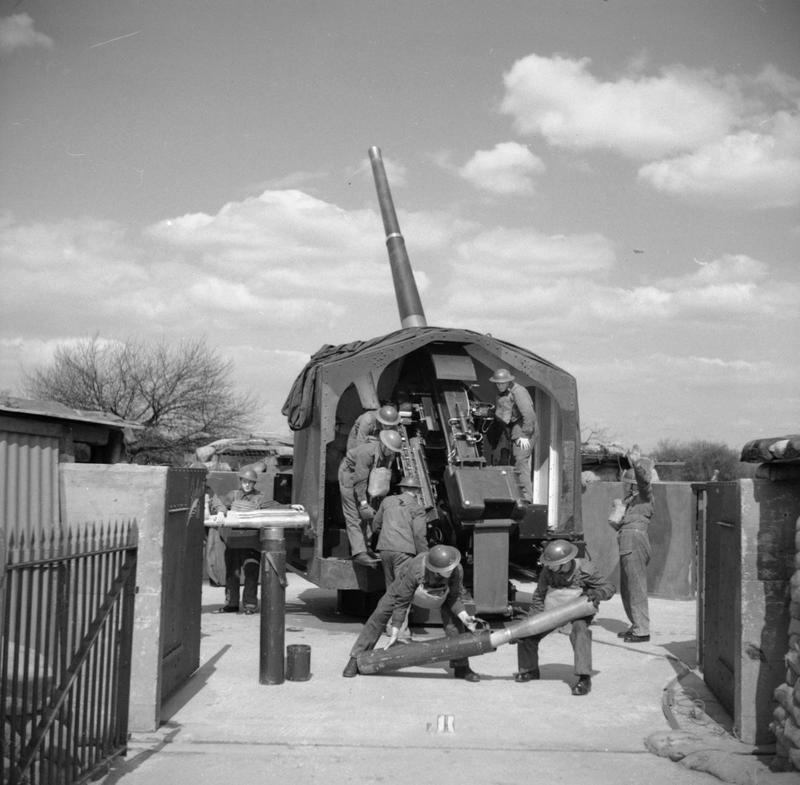
Static 4.5-inch HAA gun and crew, 1941.

The Blitz ended in mid-May 1941 when Luftwaffe units were transferred for the German invasion of Russia (Operation Barbarossa), but AA Command continued to expand. 97th HAA Regiment supplied a cadre of experienced officers and other ranks to 209th HAA Training Rgt at Blandford Camp to form a new 471 HAA Bty on 7 August 1941, but this battery was disbanded before being assigned to a regiment. The regiment provided another cadre to form 514 (Mixed) HAA Bty at 207th HAA Training Rgt at Devizes on 26 January 1942; this battery later joined 151st (Mixed) HAA Rgt. ('Mixed' units were those into which women of the Auxiliary Territorial Service were integrated.)

By December 1941, the regiment had transferred from 48 AA Bde to the neighbouring 49 AA Bde, responsible for west and south-west London, including a number of aircraft factories. In March 1942, the regiment moved again, to 35 AA Bde covering Portsmouth in 5th AA Division. In June, it switched to 5 AA Bde, which had been brought in to reinforce 5th AA Division against Luftwaffe hit-and-run attacks along the South Coast of England.

However, by now, 97th HAA Rgt had been earmarked for service overseas. This process began when 376 HAA Bty transferred to 131st HAA Rgt on 10 July 1942, reducing the regiment to the three-battery establishment for overseas service. It left 5 AA Bde in August, and left AA Command altogether in November, coming under War Office control with the following organisation:

- RHQ
- 298, 299, 319 HAA Btys
- 97 HAA Workshop Section, Royal Electrical and Mechanical Engineers (REME)

In early 1943, the regiment left for the North African theatre where it joined Eighth Army for the Allied invasion of Sicily.

=== Sicily ===
97th HAA Regiment was not in the assault waves for the landings on Sicily (Operation Husky) on 10 July, but came ashore soon afterwards to reinforce 2 AA Bde in the south-east of the island, where Syracuse harbour and the captured airfields at Pachino and Cassibile were suffering dive-bombing and strafing attacks by day, and high level bombing by night and day. After the landings, Eighth Army made rapid progress up the east coast of Sicily and the follow-up AA forces began to land. 73 AA Bde HQ arrived in Augusta on 19 July, taking over responsibility for the harbour, which was also heavily attacked, while 2 AA Bde moved up the coast. 97th HAA Regiment remained with 73 AA Bde at Augusta, claiming four Category 1 'kills' and two 'probables' for 3164 rounds fired. On another occasion a Troop shot down a hostile aircraft at 9,800 feet (3,000 m) with 20 rounds. The regiment returned to 2 AA Bde at the end of the campaign in Sicily.

=== Italy ===
After the remaining Axis forces evacuated Sicily, Eighth Army regrouped to invade mainland Italy. The opening phase was Operation Baytown, an assault crossing of the Strait of Messina by XIII Corps supported by 2 AA Bde. Brigade HQ began reconnoitring sites to cover the operation on 18 August, the day after Messina fell, and sent forward 298 HAA Bty of 97th HAA Rgt to support XIII Corps, firing across the straits with its 3.7-inch guns in the medium artillery role. The crossing was to be made with a variety of landing craft and these required AA protection as did the assembly and embarkation points and supply dumps. 2 AA Brigade left 298/97 HAA Bty and two LAA batteries to defend these areas, while it embarked with the rest of 97th HAA Rgt and a number of other units for the landing.

Three Beach groups or 'bricks' (Nos 32–34) were allocated to control the landings, and 2 AA Bde allotted one troop (4 x 3.7-inch guns) of 97th HAA Rgt to each brick. After an extensive bombardment, XIII Corps began landing during the night of 2/3 September. There was little serious ground resistance, but enemy aircraft were active and the beaches were dive-bombed. The landing programme went smoothly, the AA batteries reached the town of Reggio Calabria on 4 September and by 5 September the brigade was fully deployed with 299/97 and 319/97 HAA Btys defending the beaches. There was only one raid of importance on Reggio, when four Focke-Wulf Fw 190s bombed the harbour and attacked the AA positions: 319/97 HAA Bty had a command post destroyed, suffering nine dead and eight wounded. XIII Corps worked cautiously and methodically through Calabria, 2 AA Bde following up to cover the small harbours and airfields, and being rejoined by 298/97 HAA Bty from Messina. In late September, the brigade was warned to concentrate for a long move across Italy to defend the captured Foggia Airfield Complex.

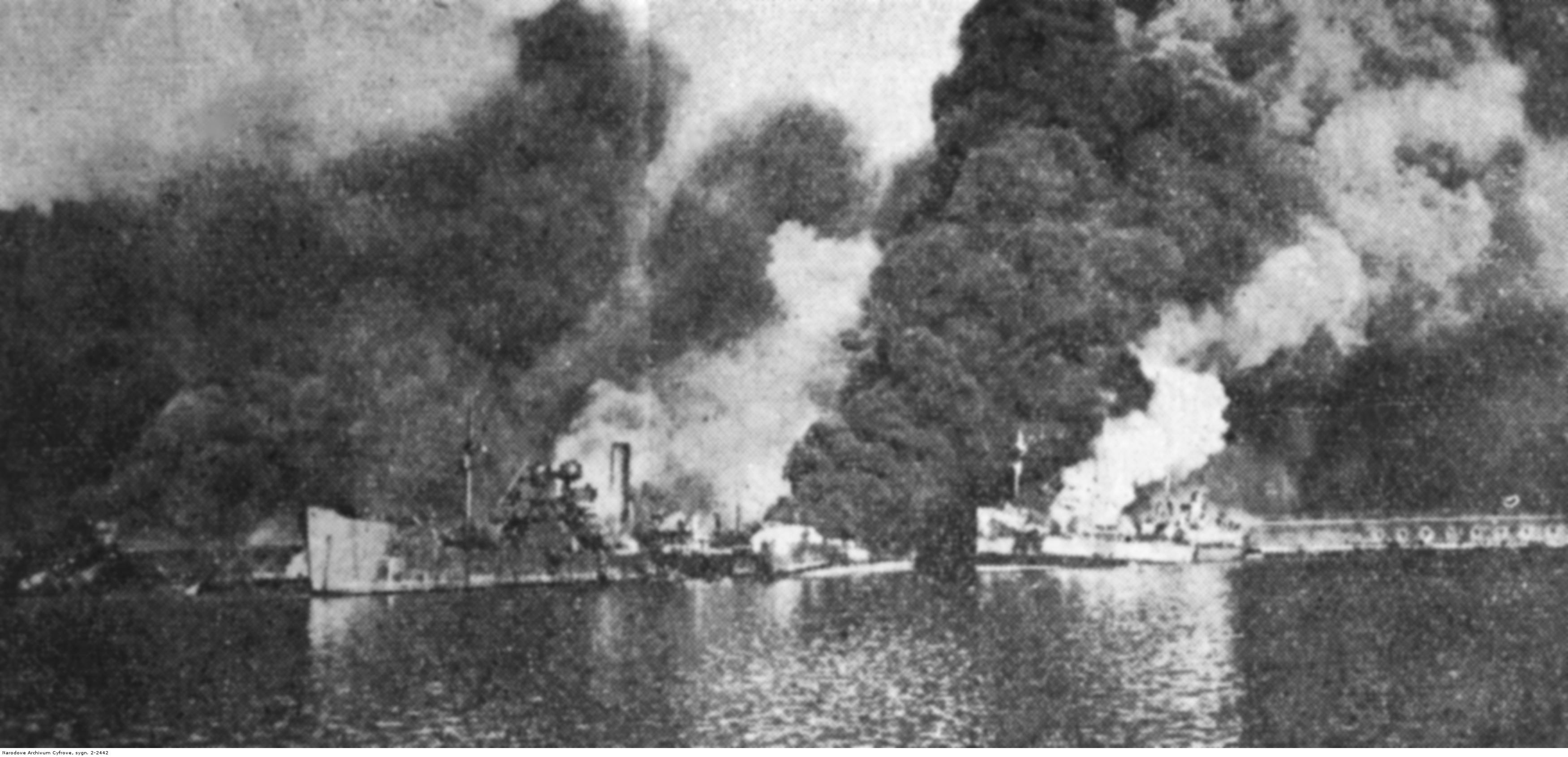
Allied shipping burns after the 2/3 December 1944 air raid on Bari.

2 AA Brigade reached Foggia and the port of Bari by 30 September, where it was reinforced. 62 AA Brigade HQ arrived on 2 October and took over responsibility for Bari, including 97th HAA Rgt, when 2 AA Bde moved on. Bari was an important supply port for Eighth Army and was targeted by the Luftwaffe. It was allocated 32 x 3.7-inch guns of 97th and 76th (Gloucestershire) HAA Rgts as well as LAA guns and searchlights, supplemented by Italian guns and searchlights. On the night of 2/3 December, there was an Air raid on Bari by 88 bombers covered by clouds of 'Window' (known as Düppel to the Luftwaffe). Not only were the RAF and Royal Artillery radar stations blinded, but communications broke down between the two services and defensive fire only began as the first bombs fell. The guns claimed two or three bombers shot down. The bombers had been aided by the port working under full lighting, and the damage to shipping and stores was increased by the explosion of an ammunition vessel. Further attacks on 13/14 December and 31 December/1 January were less successful and the raiders' casualties from AA fire were heavier (2 out of 21 and 4 out of 17 respectively).

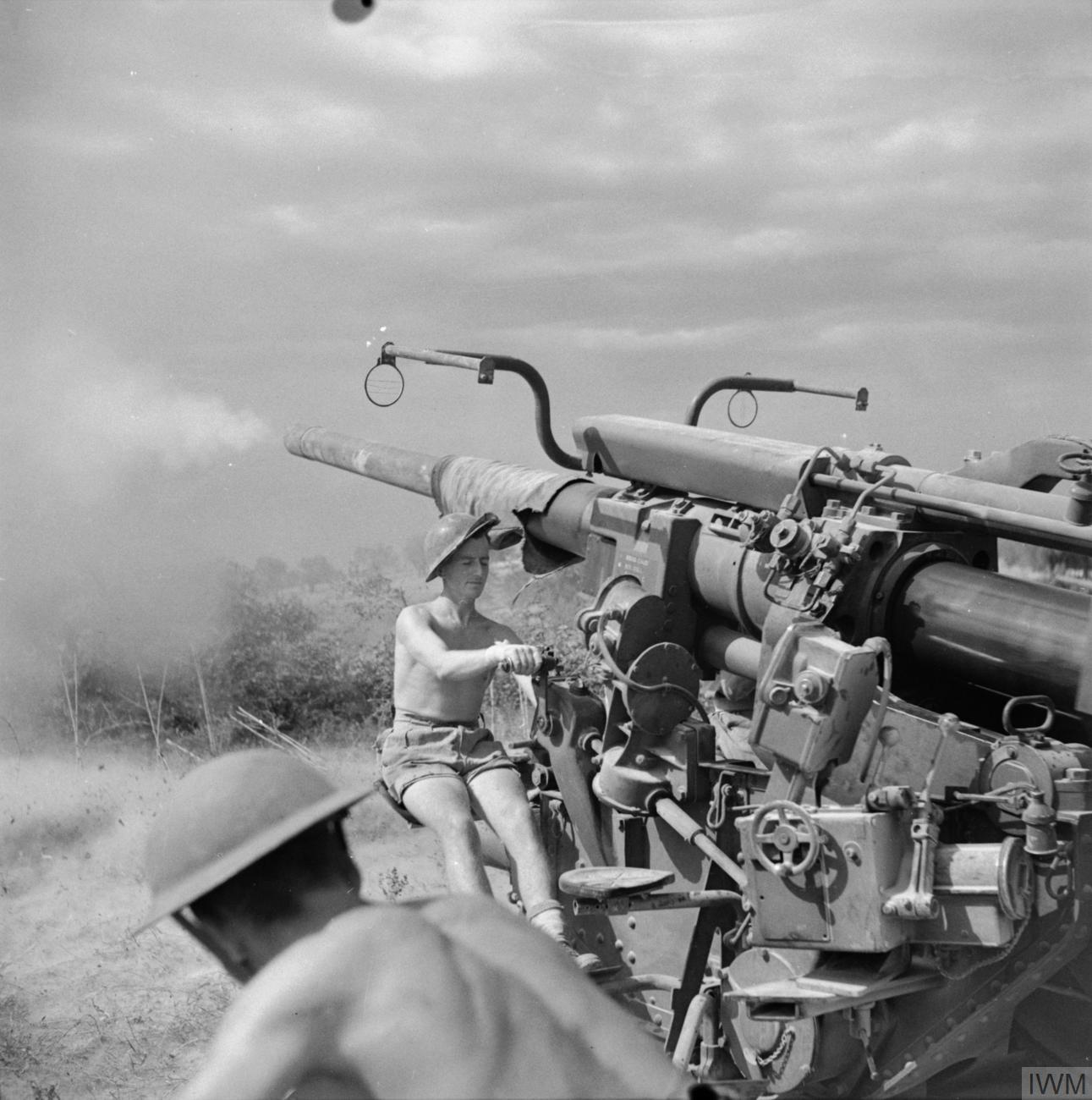
A 3.7-inch gun of 97th (London Scottish) HAA Regiment bombarding enemy positions on the Gothic Line, 2 September 1944.

As the campaign progressed, the Luftwaffe grew weaker and AA defence requirements diminished, freeing the versatile 3.7-inch HAA guns for other roles. They were frequently used as medium artillery in support of the ground campaign in the mountainous terrain. In the spring of 1944, 97th HAA Rgt was sent to reinforce 12 AA Bde with XIII Corps in Fifth Army for the crossing of the Rapido river and the advance up the Liri valley along Highway 6. Enemy aircraft were active, but mainly in low-level strafing and bombing, which were targets for LAA guns. The HAA guns were heavily involved in the Corps' fireplan for the crossing, and the nine HAA batteries with 12 AA Bde fired 32,875 rounds between them, some 4-gun Troops exceeding 3000 rounds. The brigade's HAA batteries were also on call for counter-mortar (CM) shoots. From the Rapido XIII Corps fought its way up Highway 6 on a narrow front and with a long 'tail'. 12 AA Brigade found itself stretched along 80 miles (130 km) of road and competing for road space. Each division along the column had one HAA battery assigned to its divisional artillery. After the capture of Rome on 4 June, 12 AA Bde was switched to Eighth Army on the Adriatic front.

Over the next six months, the army advanced only 100 miles (160 km), finally reaching the main Gothic Line positions. 97th HAA Regiment transferred back to 2 AA Bde whose units were widely distributed, some supporting XIII Corps with Fifth Army, others with X Corps and II Polish Corps under Eighth Army. The brigade's LAA regiments were deployed as infantry while its HAA regiments were now entirely committed to ground targets. During the battle of the Gothic Line each regiment fired an average of over 11,000 rounds in ground support, the tasks including counter-battery (CB), defensive fire (DF) and harassing fire (HF) shoots, but also air-burst shoots against entrenched positions, and destruction of hard targets such as buildings. The regiments suffered some casualties from retaliatory fire.

By late 1944, the Luftwaffe was suffering from such shortages of pilots, aircraft and fuel that serious air attacks were rare. At the same time, the British Army was suffering a severe manpower shortage. The result was that a number of AA units were deemed surplus and were disbanded to provide reinforcements to other arms of service. Other units remained intact but retrained as infantry for garrison duties in the rear areas. 97th HAA Regiment with 298, 299 and 319 HAA Btys was converted on 6 November 1944 into J Garrison Rgt, shortly afterwards designated 97th (London Scottish) Garrison Regiment, RA. Then, on 13 February 1945, it was redesignated 610 (London Scottish) Infantry Regiment, RA, with A–E Btys, serving in various roles until the end of the war.

610 (London Scottish) Rgt passed into suspended animation in November–December 1945 at Bari.

== Postwar ==
When the TA was reconstituted on 1 January 1947, 610 Regiment was reformed as 497 (London) Heavy Anti-Aircraft Regiment, RA, at White City, Hammersmith, without any London Scottish connection. It was adopted by the Metropolitan Borough of Hammersmith in 1950–51 and renamed as 497 (Hammersmith) Heavy Anti-Aircraft Regiment, RA, (Note: The regiment's old number was taken by the war-formed 150th HAA Rgt, which was reformed in the Regular Army as 97 HAA Rgt on 1 April 1947, though it was disbanded the following year.) It formed part of 64 AA Brigade.

When AA Command was disbanded on 10 March 1955, there were wholesale mergers among its units. 497th HAA Regiment was amalgamated with 452 (London) and 453/488 (London) HAA Rgts, with 497 HAA Rgt forming R (Hammersmith) Battery in the new 452 (London) HAA Rgt.

A further round of mergers on 1 May 1961 saw 452 HAA Rgt amalgamated with 264 (7th London) and 290 (City of London) Field Regiments and 353 (London) Medium Rgt to form 254 (City of London) Field Rgt, when R (Hammersmith) Bty disappeared.

== Uniforms and insignia ==
The regiment was allowed to retain the London Scottish cap badge and service dress (Highland pattern jacket, Hodden grey kilt and Tam O'Shanter bonnet), but in normal battledress they were badged as Royal Artillery.

In 1953, following its adoption by the Borough of Hammersmith, 497 HAA Rgt was authorised to wear the coat of arms of the borough as an arm badge.
