= 97th Regiment of Foot (disambiguation) =

Six regiments of the British Army have been numbered the 97th Regiment of Foot:

- 97th Regiment of Foot (1760), raised in 1760
- 97th Regiment of Foot (1780), raised in 1780
- 97th Regiment of Foot (Inverness-shire Highlanders), raised in 1794
- 97th (Queen's Own Germans) Regiment of Foot, brought into the Army in 1804 and renumbered as the 96th in 1816
- 97th Regiment of Foot, raised as the 98th in 1804 and renumbered as the 97th in 1816
- 97th (The Earl of Ulster's) Regiment of Foot, raised in 1824
