= 97th Division (2nd Formation) (People's Republic of China) =

97th Army Division (1950-52)
- Active: 1950.10 - 1952.5
- Country: People's Republic of China
- Branch: People's Liberation Army
- Type: Division
- Role: Infantry
- Part of: Huadong (East China) Military Region
- Garrison/HQ: Jinan, Shandong

97th Division(Chinese: 第97师)(2nd Formation) was formed in October 1950 from 1st Security Brigade of Huadong Military Region.

The division was directly belonged to East China Military Region.

The division was inactivated in May 1952 and reorganized as 2nd Agricultural Construction Division.

As of inactivation the division was composed of:

- 289th Regiment;
- 290th Regiment;
- 291st Regiment.
