= 97th Division =

In military terms, 97th Division or 97th Infantry Division may refer to:

== Infantry divisions ==
- 97th Division (2nd Formation) (People's Republic of China)
- 97th Jäger Division, Wehrmacht, Germany
- 97th Guards Rifle Division, Soviet Union, later the 97th Guards Motor Rifle Division
- 97th Rifle Division, Soviet Union
- 97th Infantry Division (United States)

== Cavalry divisions ==
- 97th Cavalry Division, Soviet Union

== Artillery divisions ==
- 97th Anti-Aircraft Artillery Division, Soviet Union

== See also ==
- List of military divisions by number
- 97th Brigade (disambiguation)
- 97th Regiment (disambiguation)
