= 97th Brigade =

97th Brigade may refer to:

== Spain ==
- 97th Mixed Brigade, see Mixed brigade § 1st to 100th

== Ukraine ==
- 97th Guards Mechanized Brigade

== United Kingdom ==
- 97th Brigade (United Kingdom)
- 97th (Howitzer) Brigade, Royal Field Artillery, a British Army unit during World War I
- 97th (Kent Yeomanry) Brigade, Royal Field Artillery, a British Army unit after World War I

== See also ==
- 97th Division (disambiguation)
- 97th Regiment (disambiguation)
