= Jean Walker =

Jean Walker may refer to:

- Jean Nellie Miles Walker, Australian army nurse
- E. Jean Walker, American academic
