= E. Jean =

E. Jean may refer to:

- E. Jean Carroll (b. 1943), American journalist, author, and advice columnist; "Ask E. Jean" columnist
- E. Jean Nelson Penfield (1872-1961), co-founder, League of Women Voters; National President, Kappa Kappa Gamma
- E. Jean Walker, American academic
