= City of London Rifles =

British volunteer military unit from 1860 to 1961

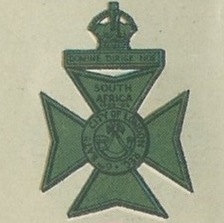
- Cap badge of the City of London Rifles
- Active: 16 May 1860–1 May 1961
- Country: United Kingdom
- Branch: Territorial Army
- Type: Infantry Battalion; Searchlight Regiment; Anti-Aircraft Regiment
- Role: Infantry; Air Defence
- Part of: London Regiment
- Garrison/HQ: Farringdon Road drill hall (1888–1935); Stonecot Hill, Sutton (1938–1961)
- Nicknames: Printers' Battalion (2nd London RVC); Havelock's Temperance Battalion (48th Middlesex RVC); Cast Iron Sixth (6th Londons); Halls and Balls Light Infantry (6th Londons)
- Engagements: Second Boer War; Western Front (World War I); The Blitz; North West Europe

Commanders
- Notable commanders: George Cruikshank (48th Middlesex RVC)

The City of London Rifles (CLR) was a volunteer regiment of the British Army, originally raised as the 'Printers' Battalion'. It saw a great deal of action as an infantry regiment in World War I. During World War II it served in the air defence role, first as a searchlight regiment in the United Kingdom, and later as an anti-aircraft artillery regiment in North West Europe.

== Origins ==
The 2nd City of London Rifle Volunteer Corps (RVC), founded on 16 May 1860, was one of many RVCs raised as a result of an invasion scare the previous year. Based in Little New Street and recruiting in the Fleet Street and Farringdon Road area of the City of London, it was known as the 'Printers’ Battalion', drawing volunteers mainly from the nearby printing works of Eyre & Spottiswoode; later two companies were provided by Harmsworth's Associated Newspapers, publisher of the Daily Mail. Among the first officers to be commissioned were George A. Spottiswoode and William Spottiswoode. In 1872 the 2nd City of London absorbed the 48th Middlesex RVC, known as 'Havelock's Temperance Volunteers'. This unit had been founded by the cartoonist and Temperance campaigner George Cruikshank and named after Major-General Sir Henry Havelock, a hero of the Indian Mutiny and pioneer of Temperance Clubs in the army. Like the Printers', this unit was recruited mainly from London artisans, but had suffered financial difficulties. When Cruikshank was forced to retire due to his great age, he was replaced as commanding officer by Lt-Col Cuthbert Vickers, a wealthy shipowner. Vickers went on to command the combined unit, whose headquarters was established at Cooks Court, Carey Street (just behind the Royal Courts of Justice on Fleet Street). It adopted the Rifle green uniform with red facings of the 48th Middlesex (similar to the Regular King's Royal Rifle Corps), but replaced the shako and cocks' feathers plume with the Rifle busby.

From 1 July 1881, as part of the extension of the Cardwell Reforms, the 2nd London RVC was designated the 10th Volunteer Battalion of the King's Royal Rifle Corps (KRRC), but continued to use its previous title, and apparently added the unofficial subtitle 'City of London Rifles'. The battalion built a new drill hall at 57a Farringdon Road in 1887–8. The City of London Livery companies contributed to the building costs, and the battalion raised much of the rest by holding an assault-at-arms display at the Royal Aquarium. In 1905 the City of London School Cadet Corps was affiliated to the battalion.

== Boer War ==
After Black Week in December 1899, 36 NCOs and other ranks were selected from volunteers of the 2nd London RVC to serve with the City Imperial Volunteers in South Africa. A further 25 were selected for No 1 Special Service Company of the KRRC, while others volunteered for the Regulars, for the Imperial Yeomanry, or the South African Police. As a result, the Battalion was awarded its first battle honour: South Africa 1900–1902.

== Territorial Force ==
When the Territorial Force (TF) was organised in 1908 as a result of the Haldane Reforms, the 2nd London RVC became the 6th (City of London) Battalion, the London Regiment and formally adopted the title of City of London Rifles. Individual companies continued to be associated with particular employers, for example Gamages (C Coy), The South Metropolitan Gas Co (D Coy), Harmsworth (E Coy), Associated Newspapers (F Coy) and Eyre & Spottiswoode (G Coy). The battalion formed part of 2nd London Brigade in the TF's 1st London Division.

== World War I ==
=== Mobilisation ===
The battalion had just arrived in camp at Cowgate, Eastbourne, for annual training on Sunday 2 August 1914 when news reached them of the mobilisation of the Continental Powers. The battalion immediately entrained for London and the men returned to their homes, whence they were summoned the following day (3 August) to Farringdon Road in anticipation of the official mobilisation orders, which were issued on 4 August. Within a day or so the battalion was at full strength, having been joined by about 200 recruits from the KRRC Cadets. Like the other London TF units, a sufficiently high proportion of the CLR volunteered for foreign service to make the battalion eligible to be sent overseas. The men who did not so volunteer, or were unfit, were constituted as a second battalion to which the flood of new recruits were directed. This was named the 2/6th Londons, the service battalion becoming the 1/6th Londons. Later a reserve battalion, named 3/6th Londons, was organised to train and supply drafts to the other battalions serving overseas.

=== 1/6th Battalion ===
In mid-August the battalion went into camp at Bisley, Surrey and a month later moved to Crowborough, Sussex, where it was trained in field operations. By 5 November, a number of individual London TF battalions had already been sent overseas and the 1/6th was transferred to the 4th London Brigade in 2nd London Division to bring it up to full strength in order to proceed to France as a formation. The battalion moved to Watford to join its new brigade, and field training continued until 16 March 1915, when it entrained for Southampton to embark for the Western Front.

During the night of 17/18 March the 1/6th Londons sailed to Le Havre aboard the SS La Marguerite. The 2nd London Division, soon afterwards numbered 47th (1/2nd London) Division, went into the line near Béthune to be instructed in trench warfare by the Regular 2nd Division. The 1/6th Londons were teamed with the 1st Bn KRRC and 2nd Bn South Staffordshire Regiment. During April the battalion began to take responsibility for holding its own section of the line, and suffered its first casualties.

The 1/6th Bn was not involved in 47th Division's first attack, at the Battle of Festubert (15–25 May), but was heavily shelled for several days while holding the line adjacent to the attacks.

==== Loos ====
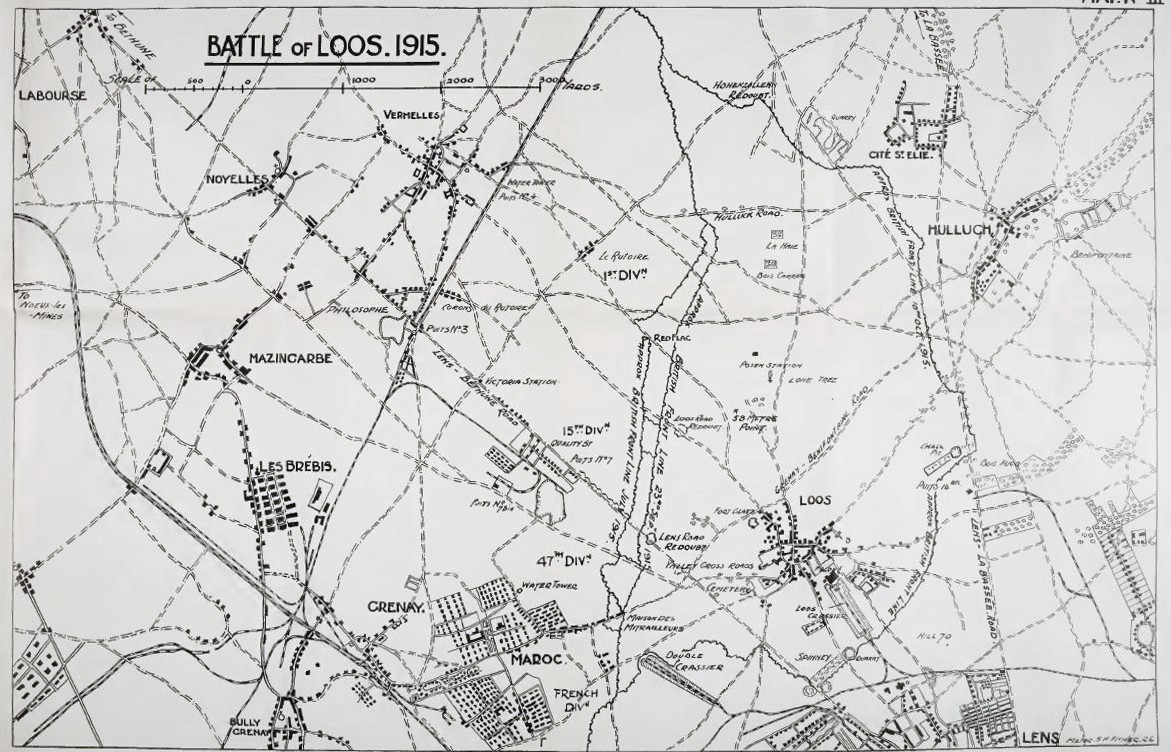
The Battle of Loos 1915

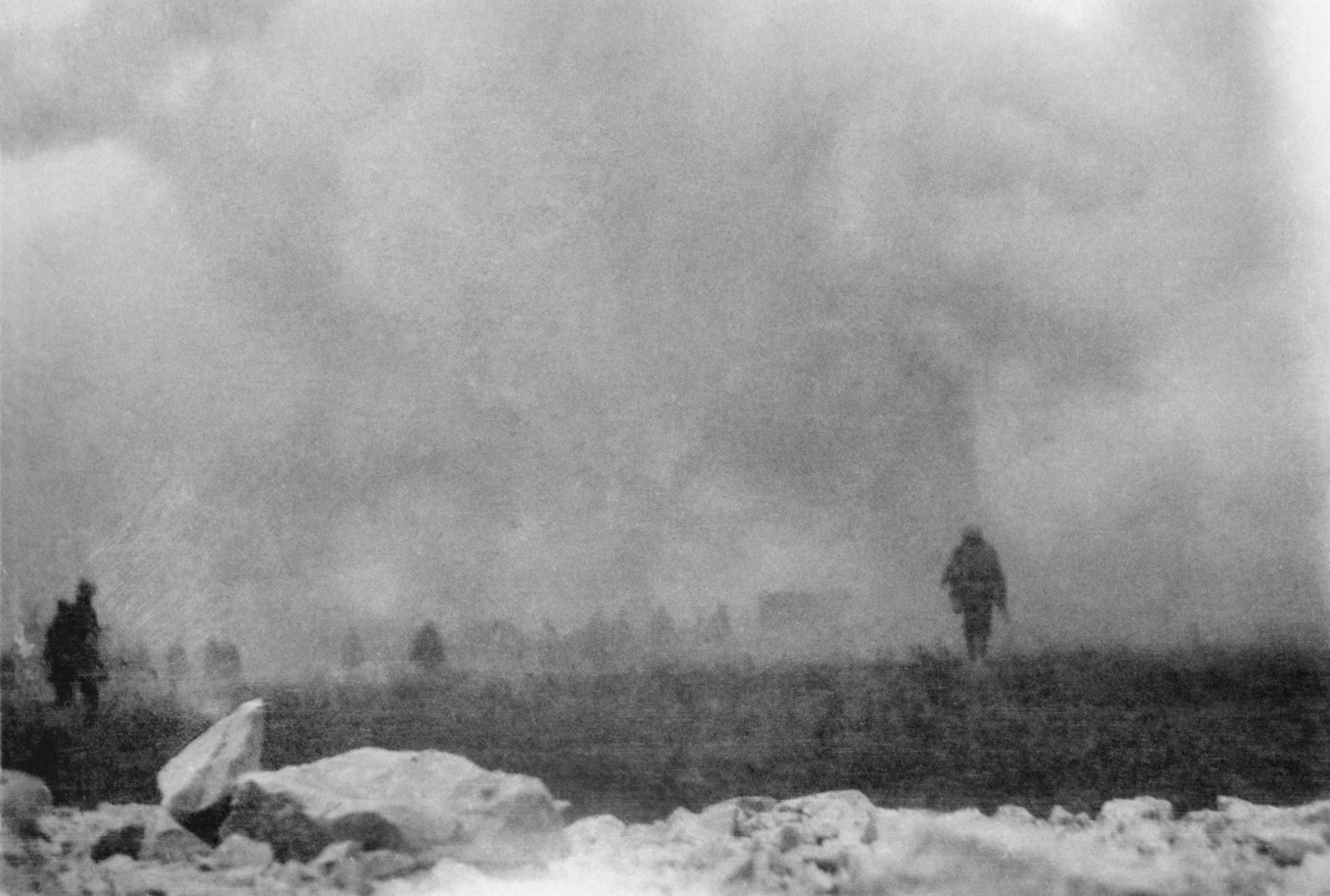
British infantry advancing through a gas cloud at Loos 25 September 1915

The first full-scale attack carried out by the CLR was at the Battle of Loos on 25 September 1915. This was a carefully rehearsed attack following four days of bombardment and the release of a gas cloud. The 1/6th Bn's objective was the German trench system running from a mining spoil tip known as the Double Crassier to the Lens–Béthune Road. The battalion reached the German front line with few casualties, but the wire in front of the second line was a more serious obstacle, there was no natural cover, and the battalion suffered many casualties here. However, the objectives were taken by 08.00, after which the battalion consolidated its position and beat off counter-attacks.

==== Vimy ====
1/6th Battalion was withdrawn from the Loos sector on 30 September, and after a period of line-holding, it was sent in mid-November for rest and training with new equipment such as Lewis guns and rifle grenades. It returned to the line in mid-December, and carried out regular tours of duty around Hulluch and then from March 1916 on the Vimy Ridge. On 30 April the 1/6th Bn suffered over 80 casualties when the Germans exploded a mine under their line. However, the CLR successfully occupied and fortified the resulting crater, which was named 'Mildren Crater' after their commanding officer.

On the night of 20/21 May, 140 Bde relieved another formation for a further tour of duty on Vimy Ridge, but the following day (while the supporting artillery were being changed over and could not offer support) the front line was heavily bombarded, as was the support line in 'Zouave Valley' in which 1/6th Bn was stationed. The Germans began their attack at 19.45, taking most of the front line, and at 22.00 the 1/6th was ordered to make a counter-attack to restore the position. The battalion made some progress, but its flanks were 'in the air'. At 02.00 on 22 May it attacked again, but once again the flanking units were held up. However, the Germans had achieved their object (to destroy the British mine shafts under the ridge) and withdrew on the flanks, so that the positions recaptured by the 1/6th became the new British front line for months to come.

==== High Wood ====
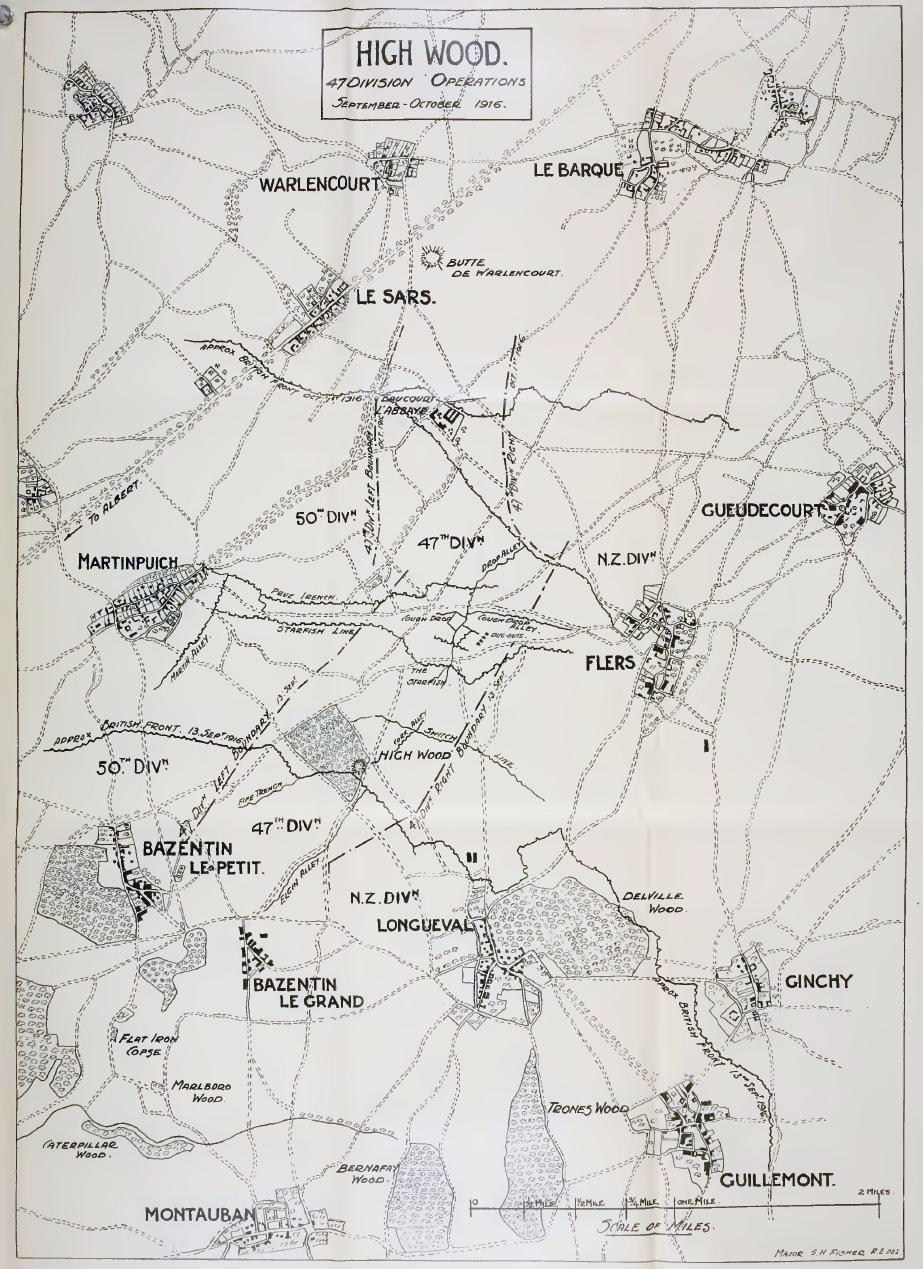
The 47th Division's attack at High Wood, 15 September 1916

In late July 1916 the 1/6th marched south to begin training to enter the ongoing Somme offensive. The battalion practised on positions marked out by flags, and adopted identification stripes on their arms: A Company blue, B Co green, C Co red and D Co yellow. On 15 September, 47th Division attacked High Wood to cover the left flank of the tank-led attack of the adjacent divisions on Flers. The first objective for 140 Bde was a line clear of High Wood (the Switch Line), the second was the Starfish Line on the forward slope, after which 1/6th Londons would pass through to take the Flers Line. The leading waves were engaged in heavy fighting and the brigade got to the Starfish Line, after which 1/6th pressed on. The battalion suffered badly from enfilade machine-gun fire from the direction of High Wood (which had still not been cleared), when 'whole waves of men were mown down in line'. Although a few men reached the Flers Line it could not be held, and the remaining two officers and 100 men (including 50 who came up from the transport lines) consolidated a position known as the Cough Drop, a group of German trenches in a valley west of Flers, though their position was unknown to headquarters. The following day a follow-up attack linked up with the 1/6th holding out in the Cough Drop, and at dawn on 18 September the battalion contributed to a mixed force that succeeded in occupying the Flers Line. The 1/6th was relieved in the Cough Drop on the morning of 20 September. The regiment received the battle honour Flers-Courcelette for this action.

After eight days' rest the depleted 1/6th returned to the front line on 4 October, opposite a mound known as the Butte de Warlencourt. Next day the battalion seized the old mill west of Eaucourt l'Abbaye. From here the battalion observed the enemy digging a new trench on the Butte, and 140 Bde was ordered to attack it and go on to take the mound. Because of its losses, 1/6th was not involved in the unsuccessful attacks over the next two days, but it suffered badly from retaliatory shellfire. It was relieved on the night of 9/10 October. This action won the regiment the battle honour Le Transloy

==== Ypres ====
The 47th Division transferred to the Ypres Salient, and the 1/6th Bn absorbed a large draft of reinforcements. Training continued between spells spent holding the line. On 20 February 1917 the 1/6th carried out a large-scale trench raid involving all four rifle companies with attached sappers from 520 Company Royal Engineers and 2nd Australian Tunnelling Company, a total of 20 officers and 640 other ranks. Dummy raids, mines and bombardments on neighbouring sections of the line were used to deceive the enemy. A Stokes mortar barrage on the German front line cut the wire in front of the attack and kept the defenders in their dugouts, while field guns laid a box barrage to seal off the area attacked. The attack went in at 17.00, led by the second-in-command of 1/6th sounding a hunting horn, and met almost no hostile fire. A record number of prisoners were taken, dugouts, emplacements and a mine shaft were destroyed, and considerable intelligence gained. After about an hour, the raiders retired to their own lines as dusk fell.

==== Messines ====
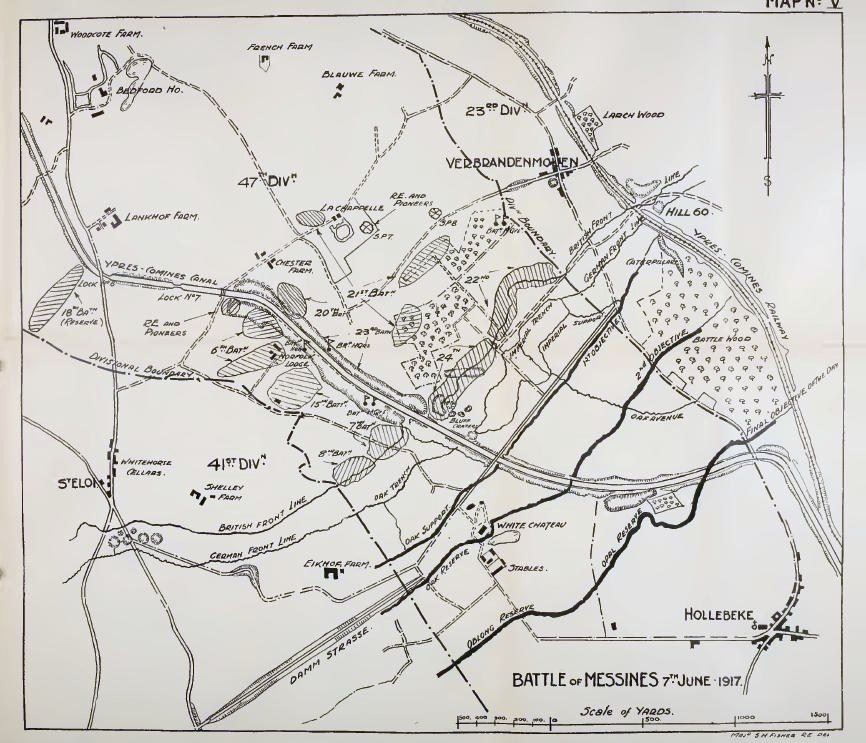
The 47th Division at Messines, 7 June 1917

The 1/6th took part in the Battle of Messines on 7 June. 140 Brigade attacked south of the Ypres–Comines Canal with the White Chateau and adjacent outbuildings and trenches as its objective. 1/6th left its trenches at 05.30, two hours after Zero Hour, to pass through and complete the assault on the final objectives. Finding that the White Chateau was still uncaptured, the supporting tanks bogged, and the surroundings being covered by enemy fire, the battalion had to improvise. Company Sergeant-Major C. Bitten of B Company climbed onto the chateau ruins and threw grenades and bricks at the enemy machine-gun teams, who scattered, allowing the battalion to occupy the position. While battalion HQ was set up in the chateau ruins, the battalion advanced behind a barrage to take the outbuildings and German reserve line. Two officers and 30 other ranks were killed in the attack, and 81 all ranks wounded – a comparatively low number for the period.

The 1/6th Bn spent the summer of 1917 holding the line in the Ypres Salient, taking part in the usual small actions and trench raids, and during the autumn it was in the Oppy sector.

==== Bourlon Wood ====
On 29 November 1917 the 47th Division took over defence of Bourlon Ridge, captured during the recent Battle of Cambrai. The defences were rudimentary, and the Germans attacked the following day. At first the attacks fell on the neighbouring battalions on both flanks, but the 1/6th's fire on these attacks attracted a frontal attack, which penetrated between the 1/6th and the 1/15th Londons to the right. The position on the ridge was now enfiladed and casualties mounted under repeated attacks, including ground attack aircraft. The position was restored by a counter-attack led by the commanding officer and including all available men at Battalion HQ. The battalion's casualties on this day were heavy, amounting to 13 officers and 369 other ranks, many of whom were captured as their positions were rolled up.

On 2 January 1918, Lt-Col W.F. Mildren, who had been commanding officer of the 1/6th since August 1915, was promoted to command 141 Bde in 47th Division, and he was not replaced. In February 1918 a number of British infantry battalions were disbanded because of a manpower crisis. 1/6th Londons was among those selected for disbandment: eight officers and 198 other ranks were sent to the 2/6th Battalion in the 58th Division (see below). Other drafts were sent to the 1/15th and 1/18th Londons in 47th Division. The remaining men of the 1/6th were sent to join remnants of nine other battalions to form 6th Entrenching Battalion.

=== 2/6th Battalion ===
The 2/6th Battalion formed at Farringdon Road on 21 August 1914 after the 1/6th Bn marched away. The regimental staff were overwhelmed with recruits, 1100 being attested immediately. In October 1914 the London TF Association rented a large country house, Mount Felix at Walton-on-Thames, to accommodate the battalion and provide training facilities. The 2/6th Bn was assigned to the 2/2nd London Brigade (later 174th (2/2nd London) Brigade) in the 2/1st London Division, which was numbered 58th (2/1st London) Division in August 1915. The Brigade concentrated in Sussex in November 1914, first at Burgess Hill, later at Crowborough. In May and June 1915 the whole division concentrated in East Anglia.

Initially, 2/6th Bn's role was to provide reinforcements for 1/6th Bn, and it sent large drafts to the senior battalion in February (just before 1/6th went overseas), August and September 1915 (after the Battle of Loos). After that, the practice stopped as the 58th Division was itself prepared for overseas service, and the duty of providing reinforcements fell on the 3/6th Bn.

In July 1916, 58th Division left its coastal defence role and concentrated at Sutton Veny for final training on Salisbury Plain before embarkation for the Western Front. The battalion disembarked at Le Havre on 25 January 1917 and went into quiet sections of the line near Arras to familiarise it with trench warfare. In March it advanced to follow the German retirement to the Hindenburg Line.

==== Bullecourt ====
The battalion's first offensive operation was on 20 May 1917, when it joined in the Battle of Bullecourt. For six weeks the village had been attacked by British, Australian and New Zealand troops, and it was fully in their hands by 17 May. The 2/6th Londons entered the ruined village the following day and their task was to capture Bovis Trench beyond the village. A and B Companies made the attack behind a barrage, the other two companies protecting the flanks. But the attackers could not recognise the shelled-out trench that was their objective, so they went 200 yards beyond it and then tried to dig in. Having lost direction, a gap had opened between them and C Company on the left flank, into which enemy parties infiltrated. The attackers had already suffered badly from the German defensive barrage, and now the battalion was reduced to small parties, which were forced back by a German counter-attack. This failure cost the newly arrived battalion roughly half its strength in officers and men. It was unable to make a major effort for several months, although it did support an attack on the Hindenburg Line north of Bullecourt by 173 Brigade of 58th Division on 15 June. 58th Division was then withdrawn into a quiet area.

==== Menin Road ====
On 20 September 1917 the 2/6th Bn (codenamed 'UNBOLT') took part in 58th Division's successful attack at St Julien during the Battle of the Menin Road Ridge. Its task was to leap-frog through the 2/8th and 2/5th Bns making the initial attacks, and then turn right to attack the German lines in flank with the support of tanks. All the objectives were quickly taken, together with numerous prisoners, and with relatively few casualties mainly from the German defensive barrage. As the battalion consolidated its gains, messages sent by dog and carrier-pigeon brought down supporting artillery fire on any German troops seen attempting to form up for counter-attacks.

On 30 October, as the Canadian Corps captured Passchendaele village, A Company of 2/6th made a diversionary attack in conjunction with 2/8th Londons. Although the company took its objective, 2/8th was stopped by impassable mud. The battalion spent the rest of the year providing labour for the Royal Engineers consolidating the positions won during the Ypres offensive. It finally left the Salient in January 1918.

When 1/6th Bn was disbanded in February 1918 (see above), 2/6th Bn absorbed many of its officers and men, and henceforth was simply designated the 6th Bn (the 3/6th having been redesignated 6th Reserve Bn in 1916).

==== Villers-Bretonneux ====
During February and March the battalion occupied positions in Coucy Forest where both sides occupied no more than a line of outposts. When the German spring offensive opened on 25 March the battalion was south of the River Oise and was not attacked, but most of 58th Division north of the river was driven back. The battalion fell back on 26 March, leaving a fighting patrol in the forest, and set up posts to guard the crossings over the Oise and St Quentin Canal until the bridges could be blown. Separated from the rest of British Fifth Army, 58th Division came under French command. Since the Germans did not cross the river, 6th Battalion reoccupied the Coucy Forest until it was relieved by French troops on 1 April. It was then moved to Villers-Bretonneux, through which 5th Army was retreating. The battalion was resting in the town when the German bombardment fell early on 4 April and moved out later in the day to support Australian troops attempting to hold a gap in the line. Advancing by section rushes, the 6th Londons and 36th Australians turned back the enemy advance, and dug in overnight in front of the town. It was the high-water mark of the German Operation Michael offensive.

John Singer Sargent's painting Gassed, now in the Imperial War Museum

After being relieved from the line, the battalion was sleeping in the open on the night of 16/17 April when it was subjected to gas shelling. A large number of casualties were caused by Mustard gas, most of them temporarily blinded, who had to be led away in single file to the dressing stations. The reduced battalion was not directly engaged when the reassembled 58th Division helped to beat off the next phase of the German Spring Offensive on 24–26 April (the Second Battle of Villers-Bretonneux).

After rest and reorganisation, the 6th Bn spent the next few months in reserve or holding the line. During July it introduced the US 132nd Infantry Regiment to these duties.

==== Amiens ====
The 58th Division took part in the Battle of Amiens on 8 August 1918, the 6th Bn having the objective of taking Malard Wood and its adjacent quarry. Rather than attack frontally, the plan was to envelop the wood, but the morning mist made direction-keeping difficult and the wood was taken by a mix of different battalions, including the supports. The following day the battalion was ordered the continue the attack on Chipilly Ridge with three tanks in support. Again there was confusion, but the 6th Londons collected some disorientated US troops and together they took the objective. The battle was a resounding success, but the battalion suffered casualties of 12 officers and 308 other ranks over the two days. Despite the losses, the 6th Bn attacked again on 27 and 28 August at Maricourt, after which it took part in what was becoming a war of movement against German rearguards. When the battalion was taken out of the line, total casualties between 8 August and 11 September amounted to 28 officers and 638 other ranks.

When the unit returned to action in October, it was pursuing at about 10 miles a day, skirmishing with rearguards and raiding parties, and suffering occasional gas attacks. On 27 October the battalion reached Rongy, where it began to practise in the moat of the chateau for an assault crossing of the River Escaut. In the event, the German infantry retreated before the crossing on 8 November, and the battalion crossed by a plank bridge with no opposition except steady shellfire that caused few casualties. When the Armistice came into effect on 11 November, the battalion was route marching in pursuit and meeting no opposition.

The 6th Londons settled into winter quarters in the Belgian town of Péruwelz. In April 1919 it joined the British Army of the Rhine occupying the Rhineland. By August, most of the men had been demobilised, and the cadre returned to England.

=== 3/6th Battalion ===
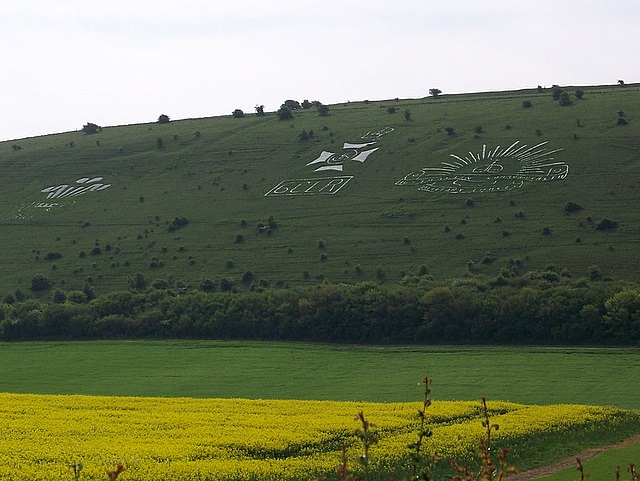
The CLR and other badges preserved at Fovant

The 3/6th Battalion formed at Farringdon Rd in March 1915 some 1300 strong. Its early training was held in Regent's Park and Victoria Park, moving in August 1915 to Hurst Park Racecourse where the stands, outbuildings and stables were used as billets and the Royal Box became the Sergeants' Mess. As winter approached, the 3/6th moved to billets in Surbiton, training on Esher Commons. Then in January 1916 the battalion moved to Fovant on Salisbury Plain, where there was a large purpose-built training centre.

While quartered on Salisbury Plain, the men of the 3/6th cut their regimental badge into the turf of Fovant Down to reveal the white chalk beneath, making it visible from a long distance. The Maltese Cross badge and initials 'CLR' have been preserved, as have a number of badges subsequently cut by other regiments in the camp.

The 3/6th Bn was redesignated 6th Reserve Bn London Regiment on 8 April 1916, and was assigned to the 1st London Reserve Group (later Brigade). It left Fovant at the end of 1916 and moved to nearby Hurdcott Camp, to Newton Abbot, and finally to Blackdown in April 1917, where it remained for the rest of the war training replacements and convalescents for service on the Western Front. The only excursion from Blackdown was a week spent in Newport in July 1918 during a miners' strike in the South Wales coalfield; there were no incidents and the strike was quickly settled.

The 3rd (Reserve) Battalion was disbanded on 18 November 1918.

=== 30th Battalion ===
In June 1915 the 'Home Service-only' and unfit men of the TF were formed into Provisional units for home defence. The men of the 6th Londons joined those from the 3rd, 5th and 7th Londons to form 101st Provisional Battalion in 6th Provisional Bde. When the Military Service Act 1916 swept away the Home/Overseas Service distinction, all TF soldiers became liable for drafting overseas if medically fit, and the provisional battalions became numbered battalions of their parent regiments on 1 January 1917. 101st Provisional Battalion absorbed 103rd Provisional Bn and became 30th (City of London) Battalion, London Regiment.

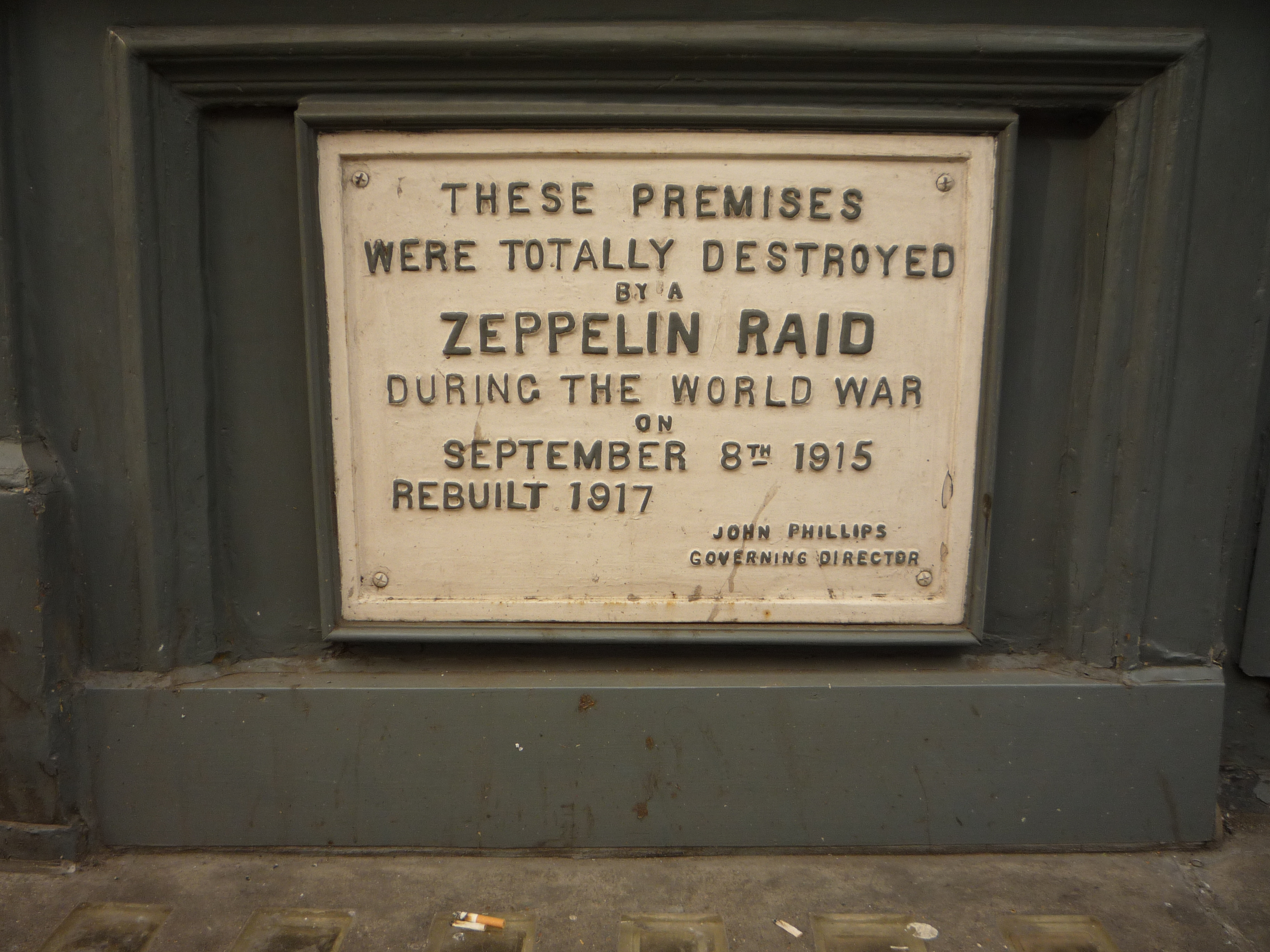
Memorial plaque on the 'Zeppelin Building', 59–61 Farringdon Road, London EC1.

=== Zeppelin raids ===
On the night of 8 September 1915, Zeppelin L13 commanded by Kapitänleutnant Heinrich Mathy attacked London, and two of his bombs hit Messrs Frank Stadelman's warehouse at 59–61 Farringdon Road. Falling masonry from the building did considerable damage to the 6th Londons' drill hall behind.

On 31 March 1916, Sgt J.C. "Charlie" May of 2/6th Bn won the first Military Medal awarded for bravery in inland Britain, for rescuing members of his section from a burning house during a Zeppelin raid on Stowmarket. Coincidentally, the raider was once again Mathy in L13.

== Interwar ==
The CLR was reformed on 7 February 1920 when the TF was reconstituted (renamed Territorial Army (TA) in 1921). The London Regiment no longer existed (since 7 July 1916 the CLR had been affiliated to the KRRC), so its battalions were designated as regiments in their own right, the CLR becoming 6th City of London Regiment (City of London Rifles), once again in 168th (2nd London) Brigade of 56th (1st London) Division. However, enlistment of the regiment's traditional artisan recruits was poor, in part because the Government planned to use the TA to maintain civil order during strikes. In the miners' strike of 1921 a Defence Force was formed, and many serving members of the CLR enlisted for three months as the 6th Battalion London Regiment (Defence Force), which camped on Wormwood Scrubs and later Victoria Park. Again, during the General Strike in 1926, the TA was used to form a Civil Constabulary Reserve. Only in the late 1920s did recruiting to the battalion recover from these socially divisive actions.

In 1935 the increasing need for anti-aircraft (AA) defence, particularly for London, was addressed by converting 47th (2nd London) Division into 1st Anti-Aircraft Division and reorganising a number of London Territorial infantry battalions into searchlight battalions of the Royal Engineers (RE). The CLR was one of these, becoming 31st (City of London Rifles) Anti-Aircraft Battalion RE (TA) on 15 December 1935 and moving to Sutton in Surrey:

- HQ at Stonecot Hill, Sutton (from 1938)
- 324 AA Company at Stonecot Hill, Sutton
- 325 AA Company at Stonecot Hill, Sutton
- 326 AA Company at Dorset Road, Merton
- 327 AA Company at Hackbridge Park, Hackbridge

These locations allowed the battalion to cover the southern side of London against air attack in the event of war. Despite its transfer to the RE, the battalion retained the CLR cap badge and KRRC affiliation.

The battalion was assigned to 27th (Home Counties) Anti-Aircraft Group (later Brigade). The TA's AA units were mobilised on 23 September 1938 during the Munich Crisis, with units manning their emergency positions within 24 hours, testing the plans that 1st AA Division had developed. The emergency lasted three weeks, and they were stood down on 13 October. In February 1939 the existing AA defences came under the control of a new Anti-Aircraft Command.

As Anti-Aircraft Command grew in size, 27 AA Bde transferred to a new 6th AA Division tasked with defending the Thames Estuary.

In June 1939 a partial mobilisation of TA units was begun in a process known as 'couverture', whereby each AA unit did a month's tour of duty in rotation to man selected AA and searchlight positions. On 24 August, ahead of the declaration of war, AA Command was fully mobilised at its war stations.

== World War II ==
=== 31 Searchlight Regiment ===
On mobilisation, 31st Searchlight Bn went to its war stations covering London and the Thames. In 1940, the battalion moved with 27 AA Bde to Portsmouth, where they provided the searchlight defences for the Royal Navy Dockyard as part of 5th AA Division during The Blitz. On 1 August 1940, in common with the other RE AA battalions, the CLR were transferred to the Royal Artillery (RA), becoming 31st (City of London Rifles) Searchlight Regiment RA (TA).

The regiment supplied a cadre of experienced officers and men to 231st S/L Training Rgt at Blandford Camp where it provided the basis for a new 555 S/L Bty formed on 13 February 1941. This battery later joined 81st S/L Rgt.

=== 123 Light Anti-Aircraft Regiment ===
In February 1942, the regiment changed role again, becoming 123 (City of London Rifles) Light Anti-Aircraft Regiment RA (TA), equipped with 40 mm Bofors light anti-aircraft (LAA) guns and organised into four batteries: 405, 408, 409 and 410. On 3 October 1942, 410 LAA Bty transferred to 143rd LAA Rgt. At first the 123rd was an unbrigaded independent regiment, then in early 1943 it joined 65 AA Bde, transferring to 103 AA Bde on 2 May.

==== East Anglia ====
103 AA Brigade at Great Yarmouth was the former 39 AA Bde in AA Command and was in the process of converting into a field force component. It came under GHQ Home Forces but retained its existing AA Command responsibilities and took over various vulnerable points (VPs) in East Anglia, mainly RAF airfields. 123rd LAA Regiment was distributed as follows:

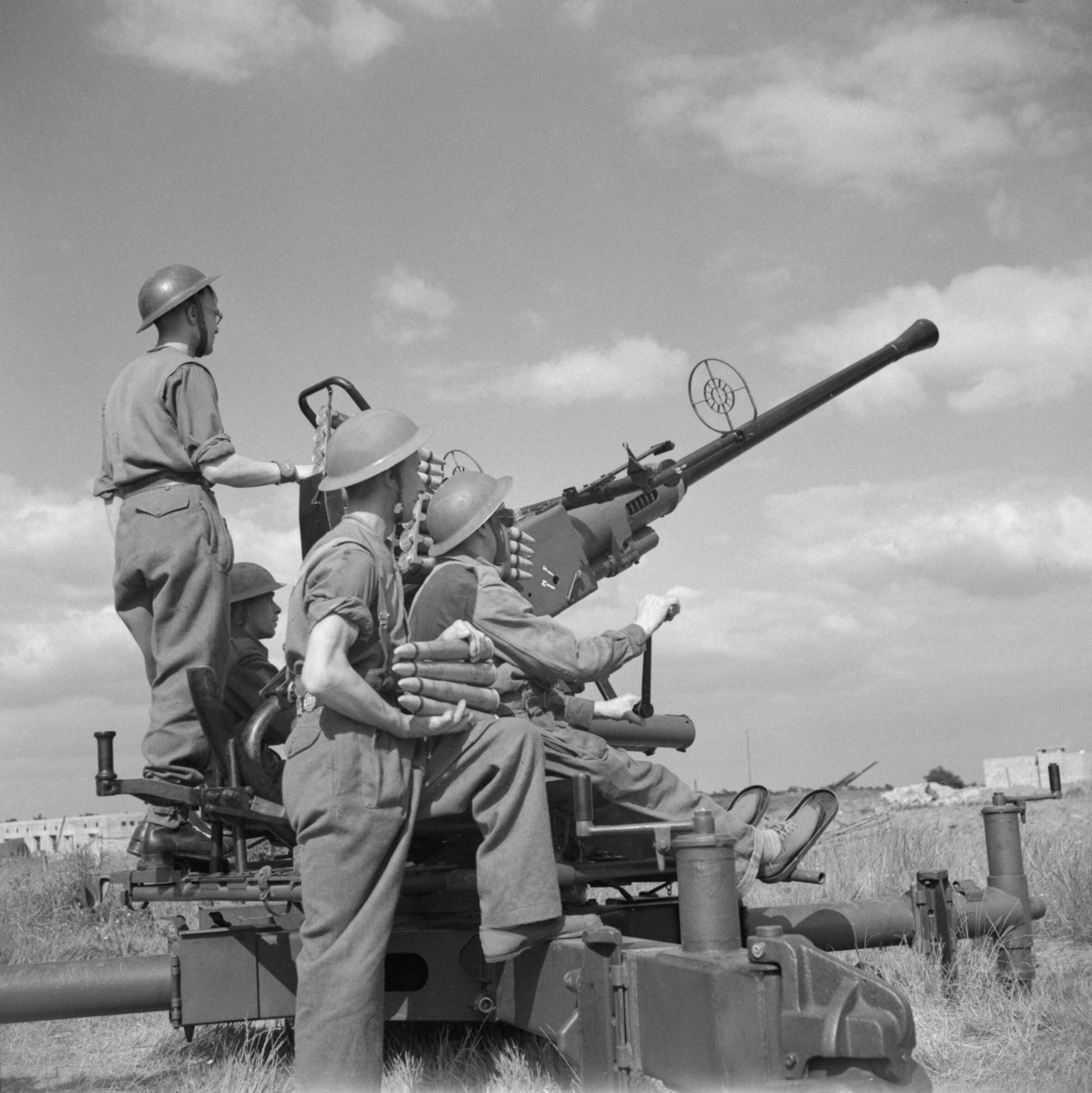
Bofors gun and crew, summer 1944

- HQ at Lenwade House, near Norwich
- 405 Bty at Cromer
  - A Trp at Cromer
  - B Trp at RAF Docking
  - C Trp at Sheringham
- 408 Bty at Lowestoft
  - A & B Trps at Lowestoft
  - C Trp at Hopton-on-Sea
  - Detachment at RAF Oulton
- 409 Bty at Aylsham
  - A & C Trps at RAF Coltishall
  - B Trp at RAF Bircham Newton

May saw a number of daylight attacks by Luftwaffe Focke-Wulf Fw 190 fighter-bombers on Yarmouth and Lowestoft. The defences of these towns were reinforced by moving detachments of 123rd LAA Rgt from guarding RAF stations and equipping them with 20 mm Hispano cannon.

That summer the field force AA units were shuffled as they went for battle training or to other brigades, and additional LAA units arrived to defend the Norfolk coast. On 11 June 123rd LAA Regiment moved to Grimsditch Camp near Salisbury and came under the command of 100 AA Bde.

On 2 January 1944, 123rd LAA Rgt temporarily rejoined 103 AA Bde, which was at that time in South West England defending the build-up of troops (mainly US Army) and landing craft for the Invasion of Normandy (Operation Overlord). The regiment was based at Bournemouth, but was relieved on 20 March and went to No. 16 H&LAA Practice Camp at Clacton-on-Sea. It officially joined Second Army that month in preparation for Operation Overlord.

It landed in Normandy in June 1944 and served in the air defence role throughout the North West Europe Campaign.

==== Normandy ====
Although 100 AA Bde was scheduled to go to Normandy once Overlord was launched, 405 and 409 LAA Btys of 123 LAA Rgt were sent on ahead to bolster 80th AA Bde in its task of providing AA cover for the Juno and Sword Beachheads, the port of Ouistreham and the Orne and Caen Canal bridges held by 6th Airborne Division. Bénouville and the famous Pegasus Bridge in the airborne bridgehead received heavy German air and ground attacks during the early weeks of the invasion, and 123 LAA Rgt's two batteries lost five guns, six vehicles and 30 casualties.

==== Nijmegen ====
100 AA Bde and the rest of 123 LAA Rgt had arrived by the end of August 1944. On 30 August the brigade left the Seine and began a 320-mile march that ended at Nijmegen, Netherlands, three weeks later. The journey included brief deployments, without action, at Amiens and Arras and the entry into Belgium through to Antwerp, followed by 12 days of movement across the Netherlands to the rivers Meuse (Maas) and Waal following the advance of XXX Corps in Operation Market Garden. The brigade's advance parties reached the vital road and rail bridges at Nijmegen on 20 September while the fighting for them was still going on. The brigade's columns following up were twice attacked from the air and on 22 September their approach to Nijmegen was halted by German tanks and infantry covering the roads. 123 LAA Regiment took up emergency positions and engaged these ground targets at close range. The enemy were beaten off but the AA units suffered significant casualties. At Nijmegen, 123 LAA Rgt provided the close protection element of a major AA deployment to defend the bridges. German aircraft swarmed over the bridges, which were also shelled and mortared. On 26 September there were 16 separate raids trying to knock out the bridges by fast low-level bombing, employing the new Me 262 and Me 410 aircraft as well as conventional Bf 109 and Fw 190 single-engined fighter-bombers. Even after the end of the Market Garden operation, attacks on the bridges at Nijmegen and elsewhere continued. Attacks could come from up to 20 Fw 190s at a time, or smaller groups of Ju 188s, and from Frogmen in the river. This carried on until 100 AA Bde was relieved of its fighting garrison commitments on 10 November.

In March 1945, 100 AA Brigade supported VIII Corps during Operation Veritable in the Klever Reichswald. Once VIII Corps had secured Venlo, 123 LAA Rgt was deployed there to provide the close protection element of the AA defences, and remained until it was relieved by US forces.

==== Rhine crossing ====
The regiment's next major task was in Operation Plunder, the assault crossing of the Rhine. The huge concentration of troops and equipment in the 48 hours before D-Day (24 March) required proportionally large AA forces, and 123 LAA Rgt was one of five HAA and eight LAA regiments that were secretly moved up, dug in and concealed, with their vehicles sent back to the rear. 123 LAA Regiment was positioned to protect XII Corps' launching and later bridging sites from the air and from water-borne attack. The Luftwaffe did virtually nothing on D-Day itself, but began raids the following night, when 123 LAA Rgt fired barrages against scattered dive-bombing attacks. With searchlight assistance, three-gun sections of the regiment also spotted and destroyed 31 Naval mines floated downriver against the engineers' bridging operation. Attacks continued on 25/26 September, the third night of the operation, and another 36 mines were destroyed. By 28 March the air attacks on the bridges dwindled as 21st Army Group advanced deeper into Germany beyond the Rhine. The River Weser was crossed on 9–11 April, and 123 LAA Rgt moved up from the Rhine to take over defence of the bridge sites. There were some brisk actions here against Me 262 and Ar 234 jets, and Ju 88 bombers, as well as low-level attacks by Fw 190s, but the combination of AA defence and Allied fighters defeated every Luftwaffe attempt to disrupt the crossings.

With the signing of the German surrender at Lüneburg Heath on 4 May 1945, all AA units were ordered to suspend action, and stood down completely on 12 May. 100 AA Brigade was them employed as occupation troops in Hamburg under British Army of the Rhine. 123 LAA Regiment was placed in suspended animation in February–March 1946.

== Postwar ==
When the Territorial Army reformed on 1 January 1947, two regiments were formed at Stonecot Hill in Sutton: 566 Light Anti-Aircraft Regiment (City of London Rifles), with continuity from 123 LAA Regt, and 674 Heavy Anti-Aircraft Regiment (City of London Rifles) as a new unit. 566 LAA Regiment was in 75 AA Bde and 674 HAA Rgt was in 99 Army Group Royal Artillery (AA) (designated 99 AA Bde from 1948). In 1949, 566 was redesignated a Light Anti-Aircraft/Searchlight regiment. However, the two regiments merged the following year as 566 (City of London Rifles) Regiment, first as an HAA unit, reverting to LAA in 1954.

When AA Command was disbanded in 1955, 566 LAA Regt merged with two other Surrey units, 565 LAA Regiment and 598 LAA Regiment into 565th Light Anti-Aircraft Regiment, RA, becoming 'P' and 'S' (City of London Rifles) Batteries in the combined regiment. In 1961 a further reorganisation saw 565 Regiment converted to infantry and merged with 5th and 6th Battalions The Queen's Royal Regiment (West Surrey) to form 3rd Battalion The Queen's Royal Surrey Regiment, when the City of London Rifles lineage ended.

== Battle Honours ==
The regiment was awarded the following battle honours (those in bold indicate the honours chosen to appear on the Regimental Colours):

South Africa 1900–1902

Festubert 1915, Loos, Somme 1916, '18, Flers-Courcelette, Le Transloy, Messines 1917, Ypres 1917, Menin Road. Polygon Wood, Passchendaele, Cambrai 1917, St Quentin, Avre, Amiens, Albert 1918, Bapaume 1918, Hindenburg Line, Epehy, Pursuit to Mons, France and Flanders 1915–1918.

The RA and RE do not receive battle honours, so none were awarded to the regiment for its service during World War II.

== Memorials ==
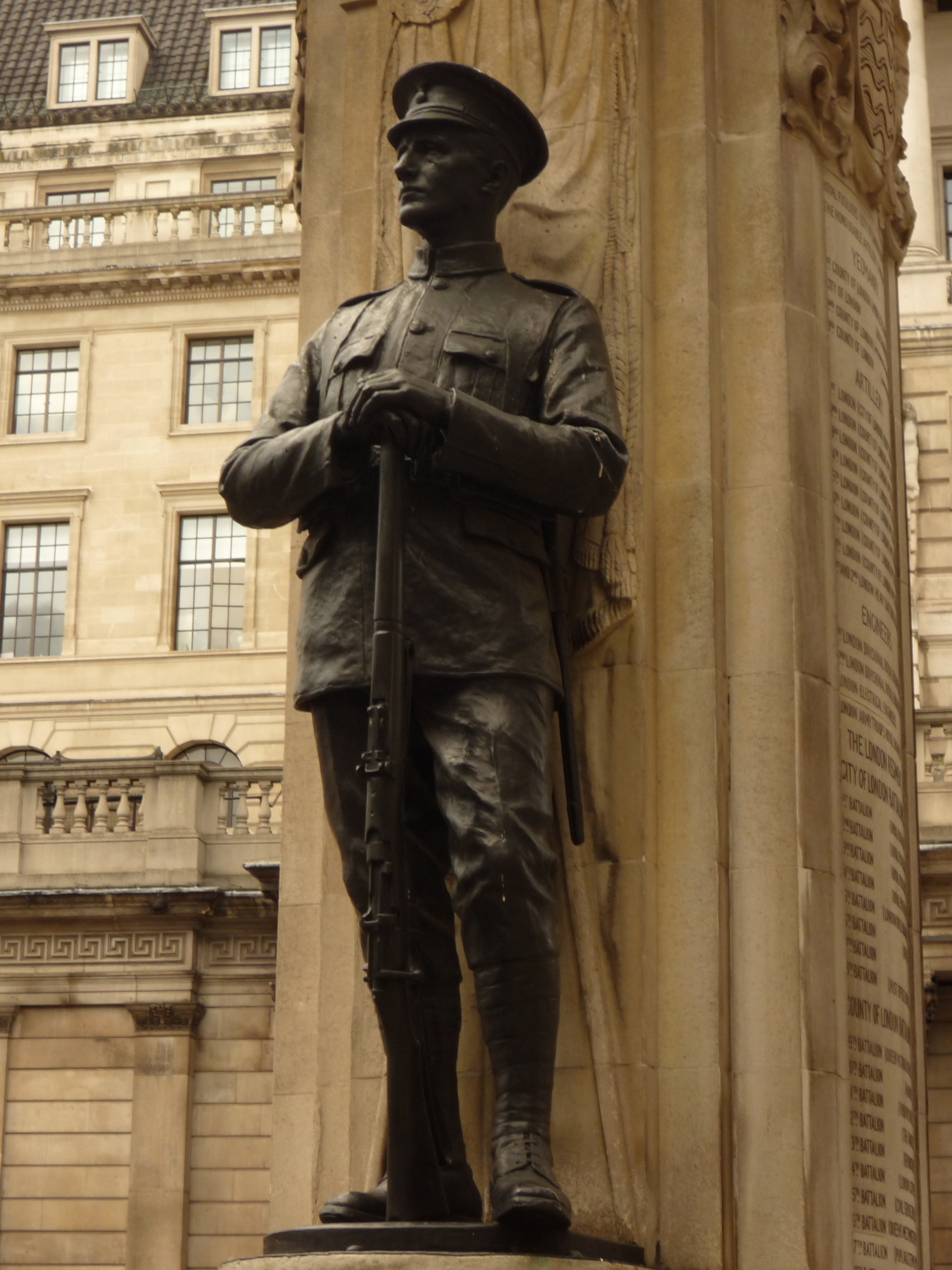
The City and County of London Troops Memorial, Royal Exchange, London

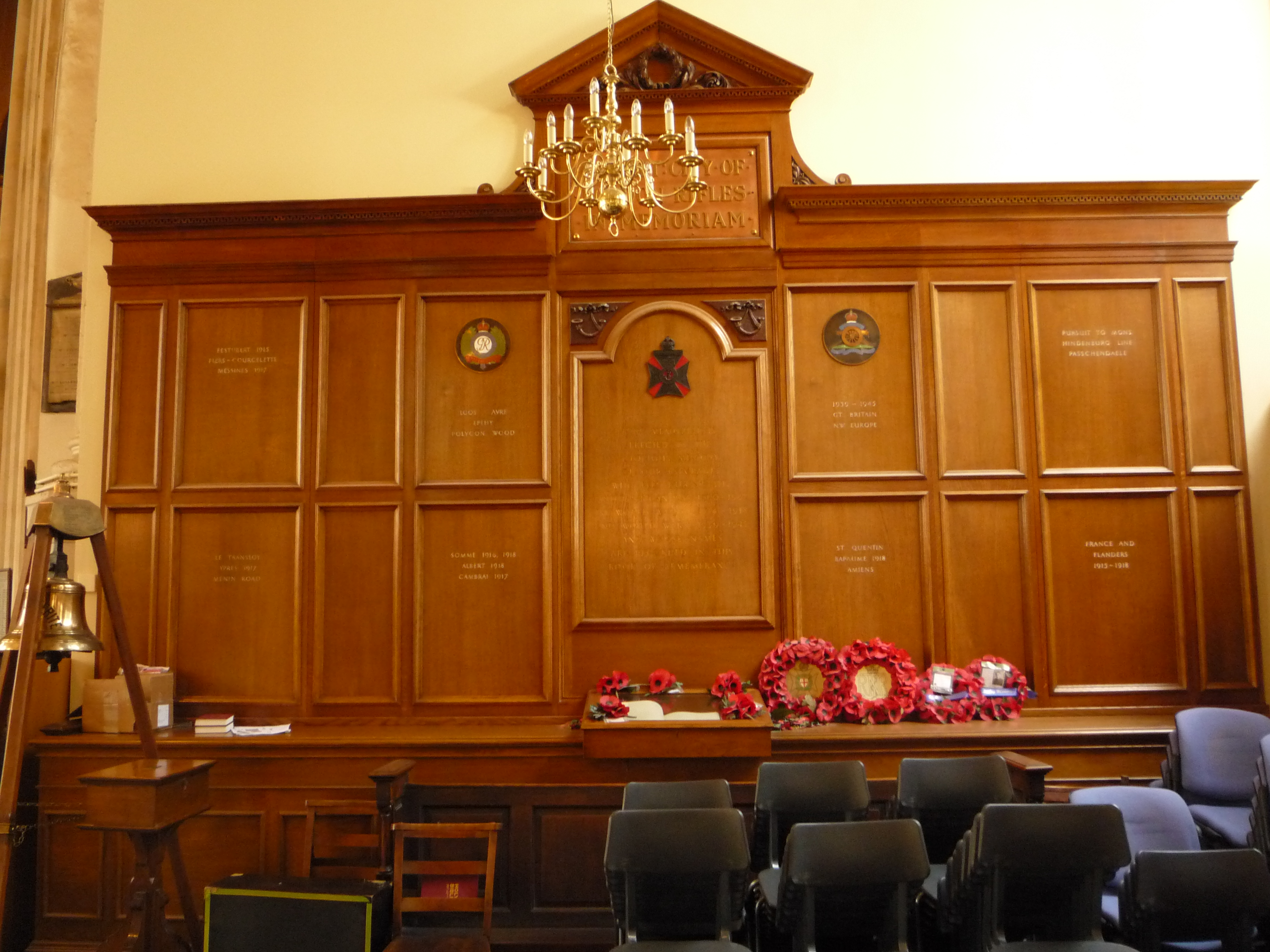
The City of London Rifles war memorial in the church of St Sepulchre-without-Newgate, London

The regiment is one of those whose titles are inscribed on the City and County of London Troops Memorial in front of the Royal Exchange, London, with architectural design by Sir Aston Webb and sculpture by Alfred Drury. The right-hand (southern) bronze figure flanking this memorial depicts an infantryman representative of the various London infantry units. In the 1920s the CLR held an annual ceremony in September (about the anniversary of Loos), which began with a church parade at St Andrew's, Holborn (near Farringdon Road), later at St Bride's, Fleet Street (the newspaper industry's church). The regiment would then march through the City of London to the Royal Exchange to place a wreath at the London Troops Memorial, after which it marched back to the drill hall at Farringdon Road to place a second wreath at the regimental war memorial there.

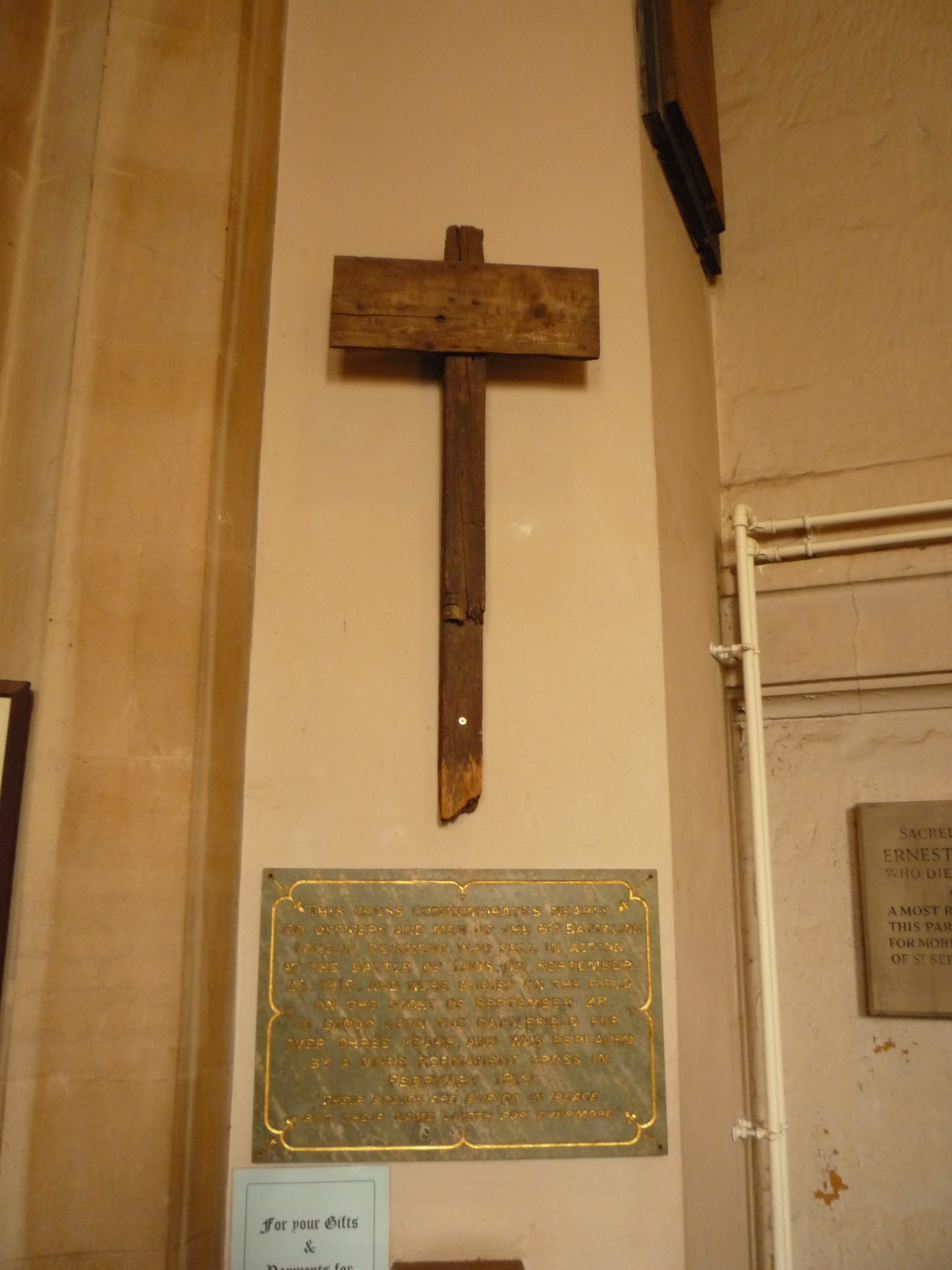
The crude cross that marked the mass grave of members of the City of London Rifles killed at the Battle of Loos, 1915, now in the church of St Sepulchre-without-Newgate, London

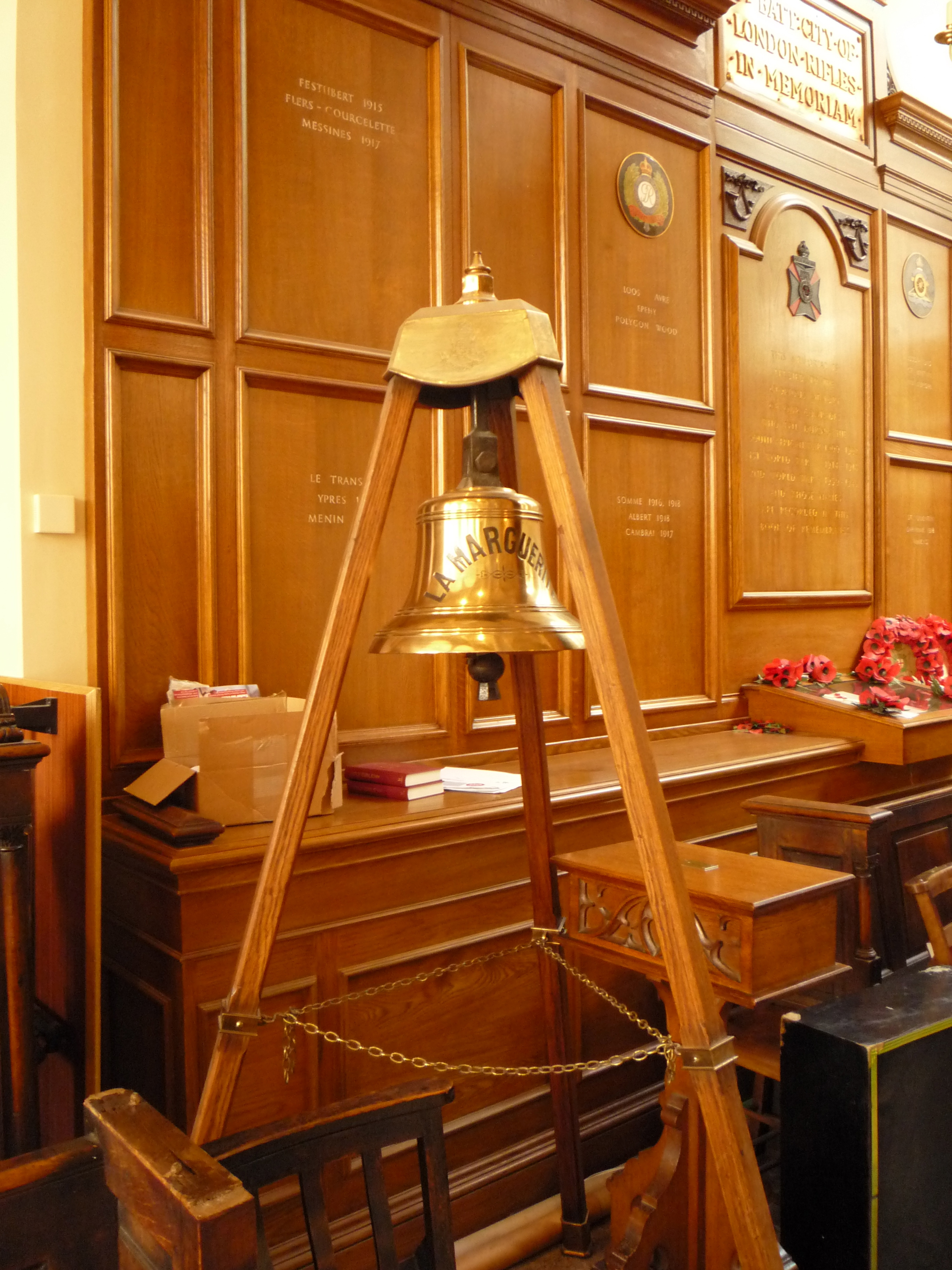
The bell of SS La Marguerite, presented to the City of London Rifles, now in the church of St Sepulchre-without-Newgate, London

The regimental memorial, along with other CLR relics, is now in the church of St Sepulchre-without-Newgate, not far from Farringdon Road:

- In the NW corner of the church is the large regimental memorial of wooden panels commemorating the men of the CLR who fell in WWI and WWII, surrounding the Boer War memorial, together with a book of remembrance.
- On the N pillar of the nave doorway is a crude wooden cross, originally erected on the battlefield at Loos to mark the mass grave of 87 officers and men of the battalion who fell there on 25 September 1915. The cross was made by Riflemen Luce and Garnsey and stood throughout the war until replaced by a permanent memorial when the bodies were reburied in Maroc British Cemetery. This cross was previously in St James's Church, Croydon.
- Also in the church, hanging from a wooden tripod, is the bell of SS La Marguerite, the vessel that took the 1/6th Londons to France in 1915. The bell was presented to the regiment when the ship was scrapped, and in the interwar years it stood with the regimental silver in the HQ at Farringdon Rd.

One of these items of silverware, the Mildren Trophy, depicting a soldier of 1914–18, was presented by the CLR's honorary colonel for the annual competition for companies in the attack. It is in the collection of the Queen's Royal Surrey Regiment.

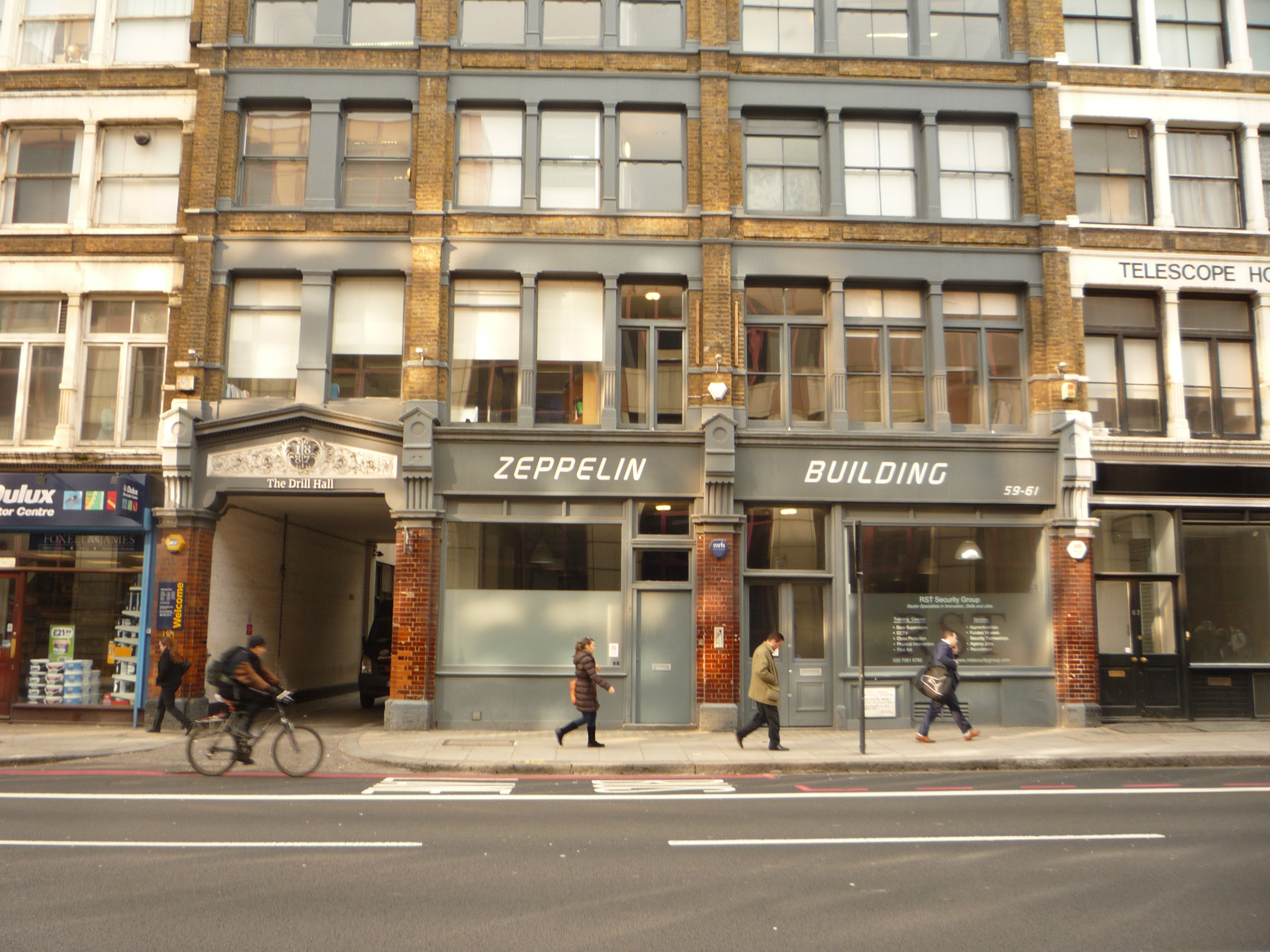
The 'Zeppelin Building', 59–61 Farringdon Road, London EC1.

59–61 Farringdon Road was rebuilt after the 1915 air raid. It bears a commemorative plaque and today it is called the 'Zeppelin Building'. The side entrance to the 6th Londons' HQ behind (No 57a) is labelled 'the Drill Hall'.

The 6th Londons' is one of the chalk badges that has been preserved on Fovant Down, where they are visible from the A30 road.

A detachment of the CLR attended the unveiling of the 47th Division's memorial cross at High Wood in the 1920s.

See also: A photograph of the restored 47th Division memorial at High Wood

== Honorary Colonels ==
The following officers served as Honorary Colonel of the City of London Rifles:

- Field Marshal Earl Roberts, VC, KG, KP, OM (1888–1914)
- Brig-Gen W.F. Mildren, CB, CMG, DSO, TD (appointed 20 July 1920)
