= Dorothy Foster =

Australian radio producer, comedy scriptwriter and actress (1908–1981)

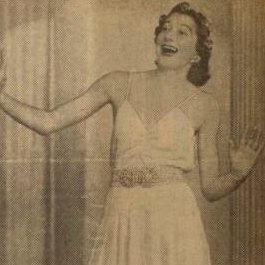
- "Dilly Foster" in The ABC Weekly in 1941
- Born: Dorothy Isabel May Foster; 14 February 1908; Devonport, Tasmania
- Died: 5 July 1981 (aged 73); St Leonards, Sydney
- Other names: "Dilly Foster"
- Education: St Michael's Collegiate School
- Occupations: scriptwriter and comedian
- Employer: 2GB
- Known for: "Ada and Elsie"
- Spouse: Alan Aubrey Salter

Dorothy Isabel May Foster (14 February 1908 – 5 July 1981) was an Australian radio producer, comedy scriptwriter and actress. She created the characters of "Ada and Elsie" during WW2.

== Life ==
Foster was born in 1908 in Devonport, Tasmania. Her parents Mary Isabel (born Collett) and Charles Marshall Foster who were both born in Australia. Her father was an engineer. She was educated in Hobart at St Michael's Collegiate School and her first job was in radio.

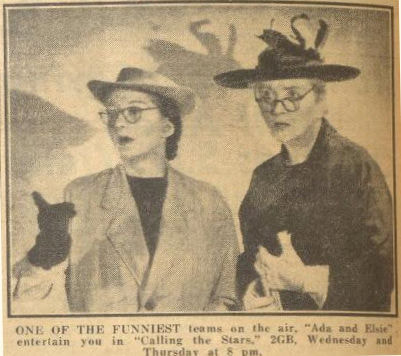
"Ada and Elsie" in 1942

She went to Melbourne in 1934 as a secretary to the impresario John Tait and she was employed at radio 3UZ in 1935. Later at 3AW "Dilly" became a comedian on the "Shell Show" which was recorded each week in front of a live Melbourne audience.

Foster had heard of a successful British comedy act named "Gert and Daisy" who were created by Elsie and Doris Waters. Foster wrote a similar conversational comedy script and then auditioned for a comic partner. She chose the haughty Rita Pauncefort and "Ada and Elsie" was formed. "Dilly" Dorothy Foster married, for the second time, a wool buyer named Robert Gray Nicolson in 1939.

"Calling the Stars" was an expensive radio show created by 2GB in Australia and sponsored by Colgate-Palmolive. The stars of the show included comedians Jack Davey, `Mo’ (Roy Rene) and Willie Fennell. Foster and her partner and now friend read double entendres as the, not too bright, "Ada and Elsie" as part of Foster's regular scripts. In 1940, the 2GB station was said to be the largest producer of radio drama programs in the southern hemisphere and she created her own company "Dorothy Foster Radio Features".

"Ada and Elsie" continued until 1954.

The demand for her work waned by she said that she still wrote "a gag a day". On her 70th birthday in 1978 she was interviewed on the radio by Dean Banks about her career.

== Death and legacy ==
Foster died in 1981 in St Leonards, Sydney. "Ada and Elsie" were revived for a show on the Adelaide Fringe in 2014 by Maureen Sherlock and Carole Yelland.
