= St Leonard's Church, Sutton Veny =

St Leonard's Church
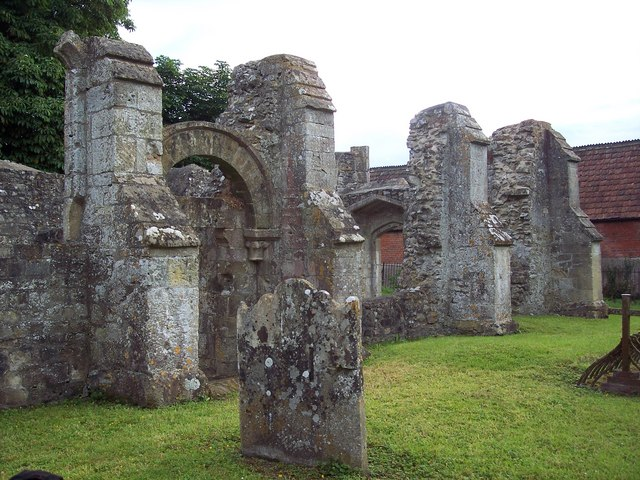

- Location within Wiltshire
- 51°10′22″N 2°07′57″W
- Location: Sutton Veny, Wiltshire, England

History
- Built: 12th century

Listed Building – Grade II
- Official name: Church of St. Leonard
- Designated: 11 September 1968
- Reference no.: 1036423

St Leonard's Church in Sutton Veny, Wiltshire, England, was built in the 12th century. It is recorded in the National Heritage List for England as a Grade II listed building, and is now a redundant church in the care of the Churches Conservation Trust. It was declared redundant on 28 May 1970, and was vested in the Trust on 27 October 1971.

The cruciform church was started in the 12th century and revised in the 13th and 16th centuries, and underwent a major restoration in 1831. It was originally linked to the Priory Church of St Mary, Abergavenny. Subsidence because of low-lying damp ground caused further damage, which had been repaired by the addition of buttresses in the 14th and 15th century, and by 1866 the decision was made to build a new church. This was dedicated to St John the Evangelist, designed by John Loughborough Pearson and built on higher ground 700 yards (640 m) to the north-west, opening in 1868.

Only the chancel remains in usable condition and was used as a mortuary chapel; it contains benefaction boards, a bier, a font, and a bell, and there are memorials on the walls. The nave, transepts and crossing are ruined, and among the ruins stands a 12th-century doorway, possibly repositioned.

There are two yew trees south east of the church. One which is now largely decayed has a girth of 14 feet 10 inches (4.52 m); it is not known how large it was when the tree was healthy.

== See also ==
- List of churches preserved by the Churches Conservation Trust in Southwest England
