= St Michael's Collegiate School =

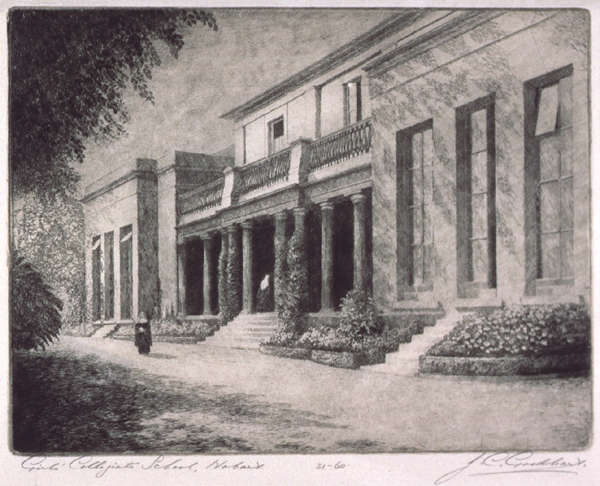
- Building of St Michael's Collegiate School, c. 1927.

Location
- Hobart, Tasmania; Australia; 42°53′17″S 147°19′26″E

Information
- Type: Independent early learning, primary and secondary day and boarding school
- Motto: Latin: Pro Ecclasia Dei (For the Church of God; Latin: Beati Mundo Corde (Blessed are the Pure in Heart))
- Religious affiliation: Sisters of the Church
- Denomination: Anglican
- Established: 1892; 134 years ago
- Sister school: The Hutchins School
- Chairman: Sophie Davidson
- Principal: Julie Wilson Reynolds
- Staff: ~80
- Years: Early learning to Year 12
- Gender: Girls; Boys (1892–1898)
- Enrolment: c. 700 (2007)
- Colours: Maroon, navy and white
- Slogan: Set for Life
- Athletics conference: SATIS
- Affiliation: Alliance of Girls' Schools Australia; Junior School Heads Association of Australia; Association of Heads of Independent Schools of Australia; Australian Boarding Schools' Association; Association of Independent Schools' of Tasmania; Council of International Schools; Sports Association of Tasmanian Independent Schools
- Website: www.collegiate.tas.edu.au

St Michael's Collegiate School, colloquially known as Collegiate, is an independent Anglican early learning, primary and secondary day and boarding school for girls. It is located in Hobart, Tasmania, Australia.

== Overview ==
Established in 1892 by the Sisters of the Church, the school currently enrolls approximately 700 students from Early Learning to Year 12, including up to 40 boarders in Years 5 to 12.

Collegiate's brother school is The Hutchins School, with whom they share their Year 11 and 12 classes and many other brother/sister school activities.

The school is a member of the Alliance of Girls' Schools Australia, the Junior School Heads Association of Australia (JSHAA), the Association of Heads of Independent Schools of Australia (AHISA), the Australian Boarding Schools' Association, and the Association of Independent Schools' of Tasmania. The school was accredited by the Council of International Schools.

== History ==
=== 1892–1939 ===
In 1892, at the invitation of Bishop Montgomery, seven Sisters came from the mother house in Kilburn, England, to Tasmania. Of these, three Sisters remained in Tasmania and at the request of Dean Dundas, opened a school for girls and boys in October 1892. Sister Hannah was the principal of the school which had an initial enrolment of 12 children, six boys and six girls. Classes were held in the Synod Hall. The son of Bishop Montgomery was Bernard Montgomery, who attended the school while living in Tasmania and went on to be the victorious British Army field marshal in the Second World War organising the D-Day Invasion at Normandy and taking the surrender of Nazi Germany in 1945.

Sister Phyllis became the principal in 1895, by which time the number of enrolled students had risen to 71, including 6 boarders. To cater for this growth in numbers the school moved to 'Stephenville', a large house in Macquarie Street. 'Stephenville' was built in 1825 for the Solicitor General of Tasmania Sir Alfred Stephen.

In 1898, the education of boys was discontinued and the school became a girls-only school, which it has remained ever since.

During the following decades the school continued to expand, and in 1912 the school purchased the house 'Tremayne', located next door to 'Stephenville'. This provided extra class rooms and accommodation for the senior boarders.

In these early days the school was known as the Collegiate School. The students did not have a uniform as such, but were required to wear a long dark coloured skirt and a white blouse.

From around 1915 girls who became prefects were presented with a silver brooch in the form of the school emblem. These were worn for the term of office and then handed back to the school to be passed to the next year's prefects. Sister Phyllis then presented each outgoing prefect with a gold signet ring. At some time during the 1920s some girls began to wear a brooch with the initials C.C.E.S., which stood for Collegiate Church of England School.

In 1929 Tremayne was demolished to make way for a larger, two-storey, purpose-built building, which housed classrooms downstairs and boarding accommodation upstairs. This new building, also named 'Tremayne' was opened in 1932. Throughout this time the school continued to be run by Sister Phyllis who remained principal until 1933.

In 1937 a summer uniform was introduced. It was very different from the traditional navy blue tunic and black stockings, and much more comfortable to wear in the warmer months. It was a beige-coloured tunic. This uniform remained virtually unaltered for over 50 years.

=== 1940–1999 ===
Due in part to the onset of the Second World War, the school did not embark on any further expansion until 1953, by which time the school required separate buildings for a junior school. For this purpose two adjacent houses in Macquarie Street were purchased in 1953. In 1959 a new large Assembly Hall was completed, and not long after a number of new classrooms were added.

In 1973, 80 years after the foundation of the Collegiate Church of England School, the Sisters of the Church handed the responsibility of the running of the school over to a board, and in 1974 the school saw its first lay principal.

=== 21st century ===
Under new principal, Adam Forsyth, positive change occurred throughout Collegiate. New school values of Courage, Compassion and Integrity were cemented as well as a new vision, "To empower every student to embrace the fullness of life". Collegiate has also updated some learning methods, with a wide range of new electives such as Marine Environment, and Athlete development. As well as this, Collegiate is a part of the Global Online Academy, which enables students to join online classes with students and teachers from all over the world. Collegiate was identified as being the site of abuse of Grace Tame, Australian of the Year, 2021.

== Curriculum ==
Collegiate offers a wide range of subjects. Students up to Year 4 study a core of subjects, including Japanese, specifically designed to prepare them for middle school (Years 5–8). Years 5 to 8 have common teachers whenever possible. In years 5 and 6, in each semester students start learning 1 language to help them choose in year 7 and 8. In Years 7 and 8 students can study two languages other than English, from French, Mandarin and Latin.

The Senior school (9–12) is designed to prepare students for life after school. Year 9s choose three elective subjects a semester and study a core of Science, English, SoSE, Maths, Faith and Life and Health/Physical Education (HPE). Year 10 students choose three electives each semester, and study the same core subjects as year 9s. Pre-tertiary students (Years 11 and 12) may choose up to five pre-tertiary subjects, however most students only choose four per year. In collaboration with The Hutchins School, Year 11 and 12 students can possibly attend Hutchins or Collegiate for some of their classes, if they would otherwise clash.

== Cocurricular ==
=== Sport ===
Collegiate is a member of the Sports Association of Tasmanian Independent Schools (SATIS). Collegiate offers a wide range of sports. Captains are usually chosen in Years 11 and 12, but in some cases a Year 10 girl is chosen as captain. Sports offered at Collegiate include, soccer, hockey, basketball, netball, rowing, orienteering, touch football, rugby, afl, water polo, tennis, mountain biking, athletics, cross country running, swimming, surfing, cricket, volleyball and sailing. Collegiate girls have represented Australia in softball, hockey, soccer, rowing, underwater hockey, and water polo, and many students represent Tasmania in many sports.

==== SATIS premierships ====
Collegiate has won the following SATIS premierships.

- Athletics (15) – 1989, 1990, 1992, 1993, 1994, 1995, 1996, 1997, 1998, 1999, 2000, 2001, 2003, 2005, 2006
- Cross Country (16) – 1989, 1990, 1991, 1992, 1993, 1994, 1995, 1996, 1997, 1998, 1999, 2001, 2002, 2003, 2007, 2021
- Hockey (12) – 1990, 1991, 1993, 1998, 1999, 2001, 2002, 2003, 2004, 2006, 2007, 2008
- Netball (5) – 1983, 1984, 1986, 2001, 2005
- Rowing (3) – 1998, 2000, 2014
- Rowing Eight (5) – 2000, 2006, 2008, 2009, 2019
- Soccer – 2001
- Softball (9) – 1977, 1985, 1986, 1987, 1990, 1991, 1992, 1993, 2015
- Swimming (15) – 1975, 1976, 1977, 1980, 1991, 1992, 1993, 1994, 1995, 1996, 1997, 1999, 2000, 2001, 2002
- Tennis (19) – 1958, 1959, 1960, 1963, 1964, 1965, 1966, 1967, 1968, 1969, 1972, 1974, 1983, 1991, 1995, 1996, 2019, 2020, 2021

=== Music ===
At present Collegiate has an orchestra, various ensembles and choral groups, and a School of Performing Arts (SPA) which is a 'school inside a school' where students choose to have devoted lesson time for singing, dancing, acting or band.

=== Debating ===
Collegiate offers strong debating teams, from Junior level up to College level. Often students in Year 12 mentor the younger students in debating.

== Controversy ==
In 2011, Nicolaas Ockert Bester, who was a science teacher and head of maths and science at St Michael's Collegiate, was convicted and jailed by the Tasmanian Supreme Court for two years and ten months for a sex crime against a 15-year-old girl student, Grace Tame, the year prior. He was 55 years old at the time. He was convicted and jailed for an additional four months in 2016, for later bragging about it on social media.

In 2017, Raynor Ian Bartsch, 56, who was a physical education teacher and head of sport at St Michael's Collegiate between 1989 and 1993, pleaded guilty and was convicted and sentenced to two years in prison for maintaining a sexual relationship for eight weeks in the 1990s with a young person (a 16-year-old girl student). During the trial, the court heard that the school was aware of allegations, but allowed the teacher to finish the year teaching, working at the pool, and coaching. At the time, the acting principal and the school chaplain both spoke to Bartsch about his behaviour.

== Notable alumnae ==
- Courtney Barnett, singer-songwriter and guitarist
- Fran Bladel, secretary and founding member of A Taste of the Huon Festival; former Tasmanian Government spokesperson for women; former special Minister of State Assisting the Premier; former acting Minister for Education; former acting Minister for Health; named on Tasmanian Honour Roll of Women 2006 (also attended St Theresa's Convent School, Moonah)
- Monique Brumby, singer
- Nan Chauncy, children's author
- Vanessa Goodwin MLC, a former Tasmanian politician who served as Attorney General, Minister for the Arts, Minister for Justice, Minister for Corrections; and was the Leader of the Upper House; former Upper House Member for Pembroke
- Pauline Fanning MBE, ISO, bibliographer for the Australian National Dictionary (ANU); former consultant to the Commonwealth Parliamentary Library
- Dorothy Foster (1908-1981) studied here before becoming a producer, writer and actress.
- Bernard Montgomery, 1st Viscount Montgomery of Alamein, victorious British Army field marshal of World War 2
- Elizabeth Murchison, geneticist specialising in devil facial tumor diseases.
- Grace Tame, Australian activist and advocate for survivors of child sexual assault; 2021 Australian of the Year
- Jean Miles Walker, World War I nurse
- Julie Warn AM, director of the Western Australian Academy of Performing Arts (WAAPA), Edith Cowan University; recipient of the Centenary Medal 2003
- Kate Warner AM, Governor of Tasmania; foundation director of the Tasmania Law Reform Institute; professor at the University of Tasmania
- Alison Mary Watkins (née Lester), company director; director of Woolworths, Just Group Ltd and National Food Industry Strategy Ltd; former executive chairman of Mrs Crocket's Kitchen Pty Ltd
- Alison Whyte, actress, Frontline, SeaChange
- Claire Chandler, Senator for Tasmania.
- Ellie Gavalas, Athlete

== See also ==
- List of schools in Tasmania
- List of boarding schools in Australia
- St Michaels Grammar School
