= Cornwall Fortress Royal Engineers =

Cornwall Fortress Royal Engineers 81st Searchlight Regiment, RA 131st Light Anti-Aircraft Regiment, RA
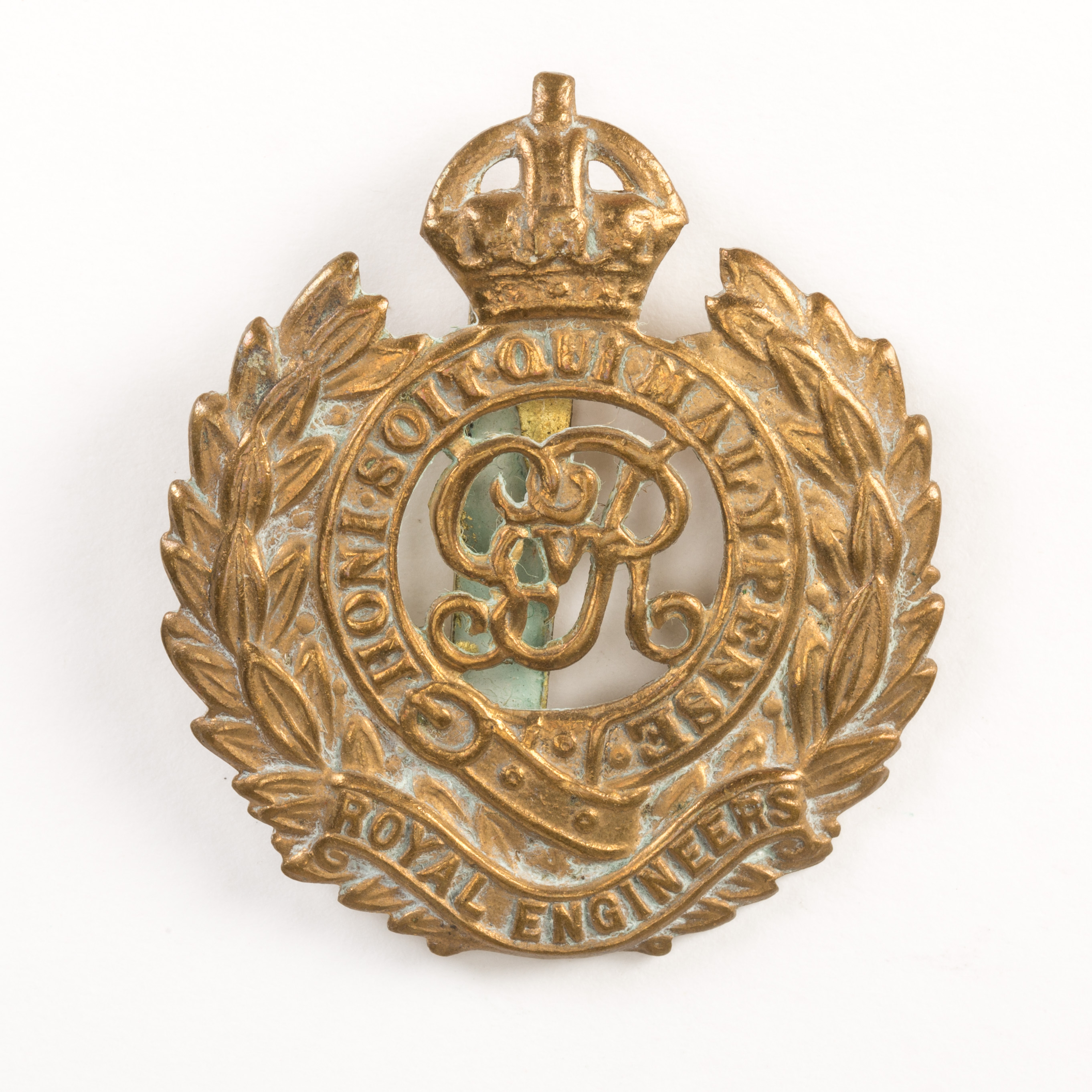
- RE Cap badge (King George V cipher)
- Active: 1908–46; 1967–69
- Country: United Kingdom
- Branch: Territorial Army
- Role: Coast Defence; Field Engineering; Air Defence
- Garrison/HQ: Falmouth, Cornwall
- Engagements: WWI: Western Front; WWII: Battle of Britain; The Blitz 'Hit and run raids' Little Blitz; Operation Diver

The Cornwall Fortress Royal Engineers, was a volunteer unit of Britain's Royal Engineers formed in 1908. It helped to defend the coastal towns of Cornwall and sent engineer units to work on the Western Front. Converted to an air defence role before World War I, it served as a searchlight unit during the Battle of Britain, the Blitz, then, as a light anti-aircraft gun unit, it served in the most heavily attacked part of the South Coast of England throughout 1942–44, including the V-1 flying bomb campaign (Operation Diver).

== Precursor unit ==
In 1886, the War Office (WO) began organising units of 'submarine miners' in the Volunteer Force to man the fixed minefields being installed to defend British seaports. One such unit was the Falmouth Division, Royal Engineers (Volunteers) Submarine Miners, based at Falmouth in Cornwall. However, the proposed unit was soon abandoned: no officers were ever commissioned into it, and its title disappeared from the Army List in March 1888.

In July 1888, the Falmouth Division reappeared, this time with Officers having been commissioned on 23 June 1888.

In 1891 it was decided by the War Office that Falmouth would be better served by the Militia, so the unit was converted to Falmouth Division, Royal Engineers (Militia) Submarine Miners.

In April 1907, the Secretary of State for War was asked what units of the Royal Engineers (Militia) Submarine Miners had been disbanded since January 1906 and what the establishment of each unit was as at January 1907. The Falmouth Division was reported to have 83 men.

== Territorial Force ==
After the Territorial Force (TF) was created by the Haldane Reforms in 1908, a new TF unit of the Royal Engineers was raised to maintain the defences of the Cornish seaports. Designated the Cornwall Fortress Royal Engineers, it had the following organisation by the outbreak of World War I:

- HQ at Falmouth
- No 1 (Electric Lights) Company at Falmouth
- No 2 (Works) Company at Fowey Town Hall
- No 3 (Works) Company at Bow Hill, Penryn

The HQ and No 1 Company shared the Drill Shed on The Bar in Falmouth with the Cornwall (Duke of Cornwall's) Royal Garrison Artillery and No 18 Company of the RE Coast Battalion. No 2 (Works) Company at Fowey maintained a band.

== World War I ==
On the outbreak of war in August 1914, the fortress engineers moved to their war stations in the coastal defences, the Cornwall Fortress Engineers coming under the command of South Western Coast Defences HQ at Devonport, Plymouth. Shortly afterwards, the men of the TF were invited to volunteer for Overseas Service and WO instructions were issued to form those men who had only signed up for Home Service into reserve or 2nd Line units. The titles of these 2nd Line units were the same as the original, but distinguished by a '2/' prefix. They absorbed most of the recruits that flooded in, and in many cases themselves went on active service later.

This process was carried out with the Cornwall Fortress Engineers, resulting in six companies. Once it was clear that the threat to Britain's coastal defences was small, six of the fortress engineer units organised their 1st Line as 'Army Troops' companies for service on the Lines of Communication of the British Expeditionary Force. The 1/3rd Cornwall Army Troops Company embarked for France on 19 January 1915 and after arriving at Camiers was assigned to Second Army.

When the TF companies of the RE received numbers in February 1917, they were assigned as: (Note: Another source suggests that 575 was a Hampshire Company and that 573 was formed from either 1/3rd or 2/2nd Cornwall Works Co.)

- 573rd (Cornwall) Army Troops Company – formerly No 2 (Fowey) Works Company
- 574th (Cornwall) Army Troops Company – formerly No 3 (Penryn) Works Company
- 575th (Cornwall) Works Company – formerly 2/2nd Works Company
- 576th (Cornwall) Works Company – formerly 2/3rd Works Company
- 608th (Falmouth) Fortress Company – amalgamation of No 1 (Falmouth) Electric Lights Company and 2/1 (Reserve) Electric Lights Company

Of these, 573rd, 574th and 575th Companies are known to have served with the BEF in France. 573rd was with X Corps in June 1917 and with Second Army by the Armistice with Germany in November 1918. It remained with Second Army until December 1919. During the Battle of Cambrai in November 1917, III Corps sent 574th up to repair the canal bridge at Masnières but it found 29th Division's engineers already doing the work. Instead 574th was diverted to Marcoing, where 29th Divisional engineers had saved two heavy bridges from destruction, and 574th was put to work on 24 and 25 November building two subsidiary bridges for tanks. 574th was serving with Fourth Army at the Armistice. All TF units were demobilised after the Armistice.

== Interwar ==
The unit was reformed in the renamed Territorial Army (TA) in 1920, consisting of a single company based at the RE Barracks in Falmouth. It formed part of the Coast Defence troops in 43rd (Wessex) Divisional Area. Later, it was amalgamated with the Devonshire Fortress Engineers to form the Devonshire and Cornwall (Fortress) Engineers (D&C (F) RE).

90 cm Projector Anti-Aircraft, displayed at Fort Nelson, Portsmouth.

During World War I, the electric light companies of the fortress engineers, which operated searchlights primarily to assist the coastal defence guns, had increasingly used the lights for anti-aircraft (AA) defence. During the 1930s, the threat of aerial bombing was taken seriously, and large numbers of dedicated AA searchlight units were created in the TA. The Falmouth company of the D&C (F) RE was designated No 4 (AA) Company.

== World War II ==
Cap Badge of the Royal Artillery.

As the international situation deteriorated, the TA was ordered to mobilise on 22 August 1939, and the company draw its equipment from store and began to take up its war stations. Company HQ was moved to the D&C (F) RE HQ at Mutley Barracks, Plymouth, but took its orders from 55th Anti-Aircraft Brigade, which was in the process of formation. Soon afterwards, the company was redesignated 482nd (Devon & Cornwall) Searchlight Company, RE.

During 1940, all of the RE's AA units were transferred to the Royal Artillery (RA). On 18 June, the company was informed that its new title was to be 482nd (Cornwall) Independent Searchlight Battery, RA. The following month, the opening of the Battle of Britain saw the start of day and night air raids on Plymouth and the searchlights were frequently in action.

=== 81st Searchlight Regiment, RA ===
Anti-Aircraft Command was expanding rapidly to meet the threat, and new intakes of recruits arrived in Plymouth to form the 509th S/L Battery on 15 September. On 1 November, the two batteries formed the new 81st Searchlight Regiment, RA at Kea, Cornwall, under the command of under Lt-Col H.D. Bennie. At the same time, 55th AA Bde came under the command of the new 8th Anti-Aircraft Division. As German night bombing increased, 55th AA Bde was responsible for AA defence of Plymouth, Devonport and the vital naval dockyards as well as smaller ports like Falmouth.

482 Battery, together with 483 (Dorset Fortress Engineers) S/L Bty, supplied a cadre of experienced officers and NCOs to 232nd S/L Training Rgt at Devizes, where on 14 November they formed the basis of a new 538 S/L Bty. This battery later joined another newly formed regiment, 88th S/L Rgt at Topsham, near Exeter.

For some months, 81st S/L Rgt regiment shuttled its HQ between Falmouth and Truro. In the new year, 509 Bty formed a Training Troop, which continued training the recruits under the supervision of the experienced 482 Bty. At this time, the S/Ls were deployed in clusters following a 'master light' (ideally equipped with S/L Control (SLC or 'Elsie') radar), while single lights were provided for homing beacons at airfields or for anti-minelaying duties at harbours such as Falmouth, Penryn and St Mawes. Each site was supplied with three or four Lewis guns for AA defence.

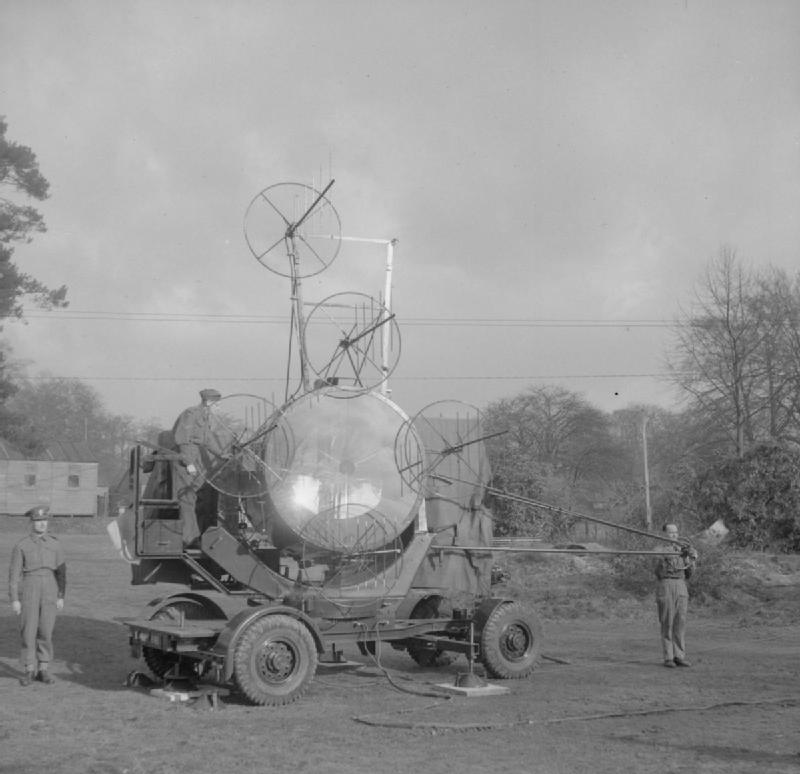
150 cm Searchlight with AA Radar No 2.

In April 1941, the regiment was redeployed from Cornwall to North Devon, with RHQ at the Glenhaven Hotel in Mortehoe, and on 5 May was joined by the newly formed 545 and 555 S/L Btys from 230th and 231st S/L Training Regiments at Blandford Camp, but no equipment arrived for them until July and communications to the remote S/L sites were tricky. (Note: 545 S/L Battery had been formed on 16 January 1941 around a cadre of experienced officers and men from 1st S/L Rgt, and 555 on 13 February with a cadre drawn from 31st (City of London Rifles) S/L Rgt.)

By September, the availability of SLC radar (AA Radar No 2) was sufficient to allow AA Command's S/L sites to be 'declustered' into single-light sites spaced at 6000-yard intervals in 'Indicator Belts' along the coast and 'Killer Belts' co-operating with night-fighters. 81st S/L Regiment moved its HQ to Buckland Filleigh and spent the autumn testing its sites for their suitability to mount SLC radar. The redeployment was completed by mid-October.

Further adjustments came in November, when 555 Bty deployed lights to defend RAF St Eval, while 509 and 545 Btys moved to Westward Ho! to conduct dazzle experiments. (Although enemy aircraft were occasionally brought down after being dazzled by S/Ls, it was not particularly effective as a tactic.)

=== 131st Light Anti-Aircraft Regiment, RA ===
On 7 December 1941, it was announced that 81st S/L Rgt had been selected for conversion to the Light Anti-Aircraft (LAA) gun role. The regiment moved to Clacton-on-Sea in Essex and joined 29th (East Anglian) AA Brigade in 6th AA Division to prepare for conversion. The establishment of an LAA Rgt was lower than that of a S/L Rgt, so the tradesmen were transferred to other S/L Regts in 6th AA Division, 200 surplus men were drafted to other S/L regiments that were under-strength and another 100 sent to the AA Driver Training Rgt at Fleetwood in Lancashire.

On 12 January 1942, Regimental HQ moved to Boxted House near Colchester and three of the batteries took over vacant LAA gun positions at the RAF airfields at Debden, Martlesham Heath, North Weald and Wattisham to learn the basics of LAA work before attending a training regiment. 555 Bty stayed at Clacton, training at Butlin's Holiday Camp next to 16 LAA Practice Camp.

On 15 March, the regiment was officially converted into 131st LAA Rgt RA with the following organisation:

- 482 (Devon & Cornwall Fortress Engineers) S/L Bty redesignated 432 LAA Bty
- 509 S/L Bty redesignated 433 LAA Bty
- 545 S/L Bty redesignated 434 LAA Bty
- 555 S/L Bty redesignated 435 LAA Bty

The batteries then proceeded to 212th and 233rd LAA Training Rgts at Saighton Camp, Cheshire, for re-training in their new role.

After training, 131st LAA Rgt joined the roster for deployment overseas at a defended port. Since the establishment for this role was only three batteries, the intention was that one of its existing batteries would become an independent unit. However, the regiment remained with AA Command and never went overseas. By now, 29th AA Bde had been disbanded, so when the regiment returned to 6th AA Division it joined 6th AA Bde, then after a period as an unbrigaded regiment, it joined 51st AA Bde under 3rd AA Division in Scotland:

- RHQ at Fort Augustus
- 432 Bty at Wick, Caithness, with C Troop not operational
- 433 Bty at Fort William, with A Trp detached to at Kinlochleven
- 434 Bty at Spey Bay, with A Trp at Lossiemouth, B Trp at Kinloss and C Trp at Foyers
- 435 Bty at Loch Ewe, with A Trp at Kyle of Lochalsh and C Trp not operational

During May, the regiment's command structure was widely distributed, 434 Bty came under 52nd AA Bde, 435 Bty under 51st AA Bde, and 432 Bty to Carlisle under 7th AA Division. The batteries were still operating AA light machine guns (LMGs), but when 434 Bty took over sites from 294 LAA Bty (95th LAA Rgt) in June, some of them were equipped with 40 mm Bofors guns, while 433 Bty went to be trained on the Vickers Mk VIII pom-pom. Only in September did a trickle of new Bofors guns begin arriving.

=== Hit and run ===
On 2 October, orders were received from 51st AA Bde to move rapidly by rail to 2 AA Group on the South Coast of England, where the AA defences of Southern England were being severely tested by the Luftwaffe's 'hit-and-run' attacks raids by small formations of low-lying fighter-bombers along the South Coast, and there was a requirement for increased LAA cover. Three days later, the regiment was deployed under 71st AA Bde as follows:

- RHQ at St Leonards-on-Sea
- 432 Bty plus B Trp 433 Bty at Hastings with 16 x Bofors guns
- 433 Bty less B Trp plus C Trp, 104 Bty, 19th LAA Rgt, at Bexhill-on-Sea with 4 x Bofors and 12 x 20 mm (either Oerlikon or Hispano-Suiza)
- 434 Bty at Hawkinge with 8 x Bofors and Folkestone with 4 x Bofors at
- 435 Bty with 4 x Bofors at each of Hythe, Dymchurch and Dungeness (shortly afterwards joined by 464 Bty, 140 LAA Rgt)

The gunners soon found that it was difficult to traverse their guns quickly enough to engage the fast-moving Focke-Wulf Fw 190 fighter-bombers coming in low over the coast, often in poor visibility, to drop their bombs or fire their cannons on the towns. Junkers Ju 88s and Dornier Do 215 bombers at medium altitude were easier targets and 434 Bty claimed its first Ju 88 shot down on 20 October – but were told that it was a friendly Beaufighter.

The regiment's positions and commands were regularly shuffled in efforts to meet the threats: 435 Bty moved to Littlehampton in 47th AA Bde's area, later back to Friston and Eastbourne, while RHQ, 432 and 433 Btys came under operational command of 5th AA Bde. At the beginning of December, 71 AA Bde sent 434 Bty to Dover where it deployed A Troop to cover the harbour, B Trp the radar station, and C Trp the coast defences.

Raids continued at intervals during the winter, with the gun sites reporting a few successes, and several near misses from bombs. At various times the regiment was reinforced by troops and batteries from the neighbouring 19 LAA Rgt (60, 104 and 290 AA Btys) and 7 Canadian LAA Rgt (F Trp). When 19 LAA Rgt departed for mobile training at the end of February 1943, 60 Bty was replaced under 131 LAA Rgt's operational control by 230 Bty from 138 LAA Rgt. Early that month, 463 S/L Bty of 71 S/L Rgt arrived to man Vickers K machine guns (8 twins each at Hastings, St Leonards, Bexhill and Eastbourne) under command of 131 LAA Rgt, followed by reinforcements of the same regiment's 462 S/L Bty later in the month. 131 LAA Regiment was also reinforced by six flights of the RAF Regiment equipped with Beaverette armoured cars, and later other flights with 20 mm guns. Anti-Aircraft Barrage balloons were positioned round the vulnerable towns. In March 131 LAA Rgt's defences around Pevensey and Hastings were further increased by 320 Bty of 93 LAA Rgt, which had been borrowed by AA Command from 42nd Armoured Division in December and positioned between Brighton and Seaford. In addition, the local heavy AA unit at Newhaven, 179 (Mixed) HAA Rgt, was trained by 131 LAA Rgt to operate extra Bofors guns against the fleeting targets of opportunity that the Luftwaffe fighter-bombers presented.

Peak strength in LAA defences against the hit-and-run attacks was reached in March 1943, and the success rate began to rise that month. On 11 March a force of 20 aircraft attacked Hastings, of which four were shot down (Category I hits) and one damaged (Cat III) by the massed LAA defences. But on 3 April, when 12 enemy aircraft bombed and machine-gunned Eastbourne from the landward side, the Bofors gunners' predictors and range-finders were useless. Only firing with 'open sights' as with the 20 mm and LMGs was effective. The Bofors guns were equipped with auto-loading devices to increase their rate of fire, and gunshields to protect the crews. Further RAF and Canadian LAA gunners 'thickened up' the defences in the regimental area.

Apart from battery training at No 8 LAA Practice Camp at Watchet, the regiment remained on the South Coast throughout this period, reverting from 5 AA Bde to 71 AA Bde's command on 1 May. When 71 S/L Rgt was disbanded, some of its personnel were drafted to 131 LAA Rgt as reinforcements, their twin Vickers K and triple Lewis guns being positioned at 131 LAA's regimental, battery and troop HQs to be manned by HQ personnel if required. No. 2872 Squadron RAF Regiment arrived in June with twin Browning machine guns to replace the Beaverettes and came under 131 LAA Rgt's operational control, and trials on siting 2-inch AA rocket launchers ('Z Batteries') alongside Bofors guns were carried out. In July a Gun Operations Room (GOR) was established at Bexhill to co-ordinate early warnings, and Lt-Col Bennie of 131 LAA Rgt was appointed AA Defence Commander (AADC) for the Bexhill–Dungeness Gun Defence Area. However, the increasing casualties inflicted on raiders in May and June led the Luftwaffe to give up these attacks. Throughout the 'hit and run' campaign, Hastings and Eastbourne had been two of the three most heavily attacked towns in England.

The regiment remained in its positions through the remainder of 1943 and into 1944. Some men were posted away to mobile units and replaced by men of lower medical category, while a larger number of men considered untrainable in LAA duties were posted away and replaced by male personnel from 173 (Mixed) HAA Rgt. Between 21 January and 14 March 1944, the Luftwaffe crossed SE England to carry out 11 night raids on London in the so-called Baby Blitz. However, by early 1944, AA Command was being forced to release manpower for service overseas, including the planned invasion of Normandy (Operation Overlord), and most of AA Command's regiments lost one of their four batteries. In the case of 131st LAA Rgt, it was 435 Bty that left on 17 February, to be disbanded at St Leonards on 16 March.

=== Operation Diver ===
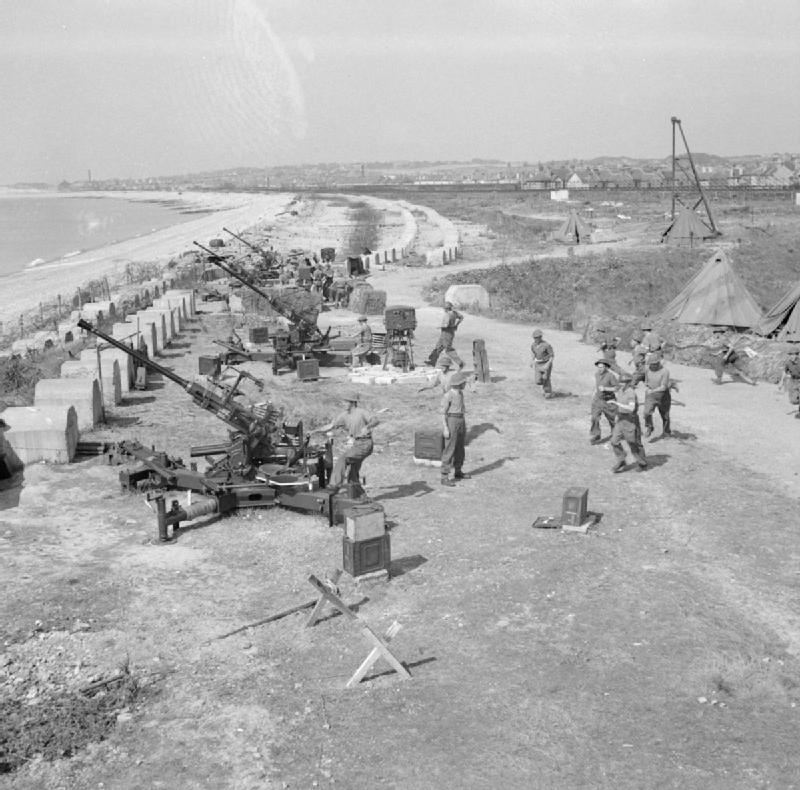
Bofors guns at a South Coast LAA battery, August 1944.

Soon after D-Day, the Germans began launching V-1 flying bombs against London by day and night. The stream of V-1s, codenamed 'Divers' flew through 2 AA Group's area between Newhaven and North Foreland, and the AA resources in SE England were strongly reinforced in Operation Diver. These small, fast-moving targets flying at 2–3000 feet were essentially LAA targets, but the early results against them were poor, even with LAA guns interspersed with the searchlight belt where S/L Control (SLC or 'Elsie') radar could guide the guns. The Diver belt was therefore redeployed with emphasis on HAA and LAA guns firing out to sea as the V-1s approached land. 71 AA Brigade, including 131 LAA Rgt formed part of this belt.

In August 1944, as part of the redistribution of LAA guns, 414 LAA Bty from 144 LAA Rgt was deployed to Hawkinge, just inland from the coast, and attached to 131 LAA Rgt.

All these units were heavily engaged until the autumn, when 21st Army Group overran the V-1 launching sites in northern France. The emphasis then shifted to the Thames Estuary as the Luftwaffe began launching V-1s from aircraft over the North Sea. 1 AA Group, previously controlling the London Inner Artillery Zone, established a 'Diver Box' covering the estuary and 131 LAA Rgt left 71 AA Bde and joined 57th AA Bde in this box by 16 October 1944.

A new 9 AA Group was formed in November 1944 to take over 'Diver' defences in East Anglia, while 1 AA Group concentrated on the estuary. In January 1945, RHQ of 131 LAA Rgt moved across the Thames from Gravesend to Orsett under 9 AA Group, the move having been delayed by damage to the new HQ caused by a V-2 rocket. A gun site was damaged by another V2 near miss, and the guns still occasionally engaged V-1s flying over the area towards London.

=== Demobilisation ===
By now, 21st Army Group fighting in North West Europe was suffering a severe manpower shortage, and at the end of January the regiment had to send 64 NCOs and men to infantry training regiments, receiving 64 infantrymen of lower medical category in exchange. V-1 attacks declined after January, but the regiment witnessed continuous V2 activity during February, and there was a final flare-up of long-range V-1s launched from North Holland in March. The regiment continued to man guns at Vital Points at Chatham Dockyard, Sheerness, Purfleet, Tilbury and Thameshaven, with 425 Bty of 129 LAA Rgt at Chelmsford under operational command of 131 LAA Rgt.

Lieutenant-Colonel Bennie, OBE, TD, who had commanded the regiment since the formation of 81 S/L Rgt in November 1940, left in March 1945 to command 625 Rgt RA (an infantry battalion formed from 95 LAA Rgt) in NW Europe, and was replaced by Lt-Col T.W.D. Hackett, MC.

After VE Day, the state of readiness was maintained on the regiment's gun positions until ordered to stand down by 9 AA Group on 20 May. 432 Bty (the original Cornwall and Devon Fortress RE) became an independent battery in 28 (Thames & Medway) AA Bde, while the rest of 131 LAA Rgt moved from Tilbury to Birmingham. There it was progressively wound down as the men were demobilised. 433 and 434 Btys began to disband in August, and RHQ 131 LAA Regiment officially ceased to exist at West Derby, Liverpool, on 7 March 1946.

432 Bty was briefly regimented with 148 LAA Rgt in August 1945 before passing into suspended animation.

== Postwar ==
When the TA was reconstituted in 1947, 856th Movement Light Battery (Devon & Cornwall Fortress Engineers) was reformed at Plymouth from 432nd LAA Battery of the former 131 LAA Regiment. Movement light or 'artificial moonlight' units used searchlights to illuminate ground operations at night. The battery converted back to the Royal Engineers in 1956, amalgamating into 571 Field Squadron, derived from the Devonshire Fortress Engineers.

A new RE unit was formed in Cornwall in 1956, 409 (Cornwall) Independent Field Squadron, but this was created by converting 409 (Cornwall) Coast Regiment, Royal Artillery, the former Duke of Cornwall's Artillery at Falmouth. From 1961, it was included in 116 (Devon and Cornwall) Engineer Regiment. When the TA was converted into the TAVR in 1967, the unit was reconstituted as a company of the Duke of Cornwall's Light Infantry (Territorials) at Falmouth, with the old title restored: B Company (Cornwall Fortress Engineers). However, the restoration was short-lived, because the TAVR units were reduced to cadre size in 1969, and although they were expanded again in 1971, the Falmouth unit only formed a detachment of C (Duke of Cornwall's Light Infantry) Company in 6th Battalion, The Light Infantry (Volunteers), based at Camborne.
