= Farringdon Road drill hall =

- Finsbury, London
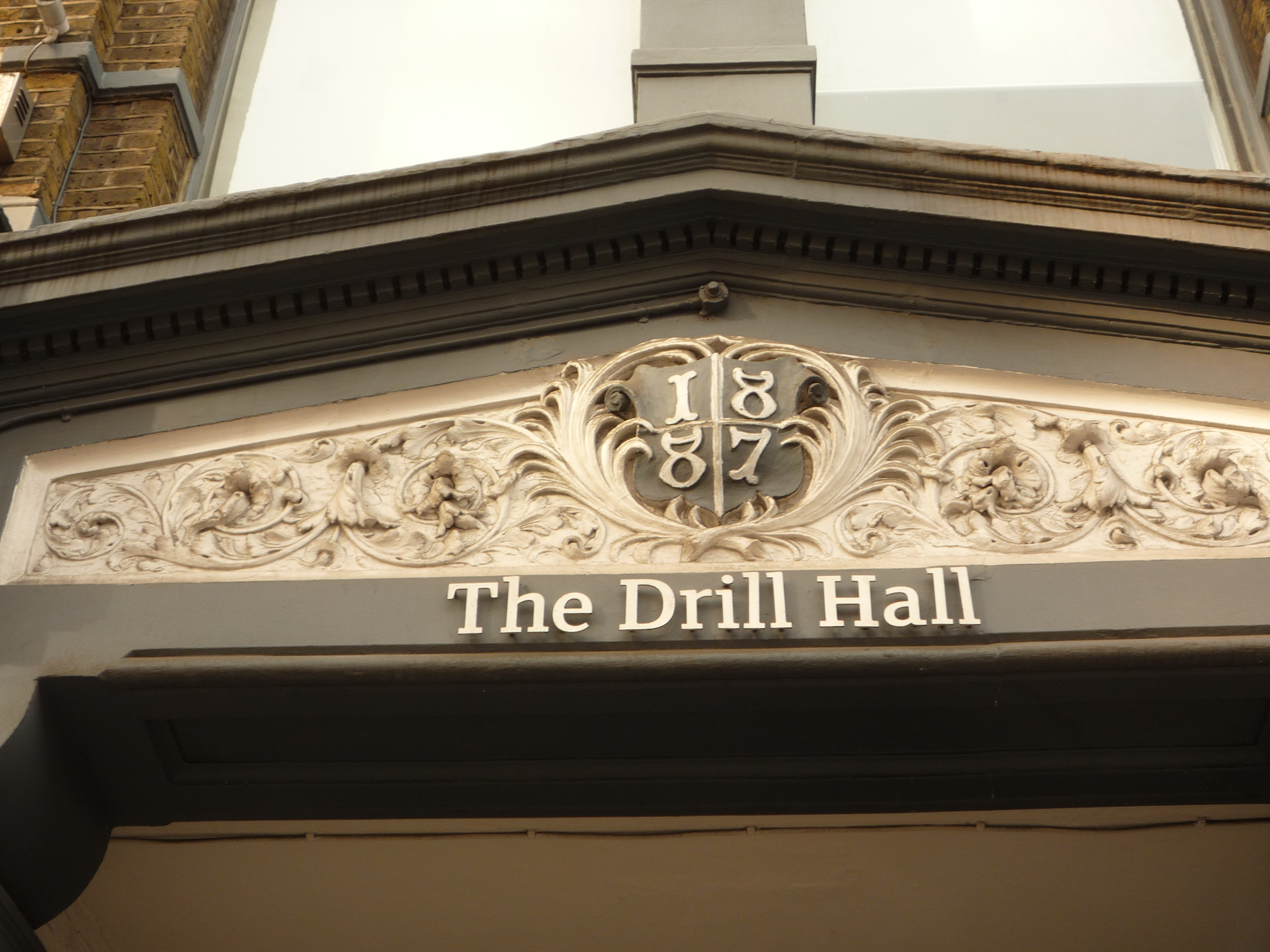
- The drill hall entrance in Farringdon Road

Site information
- Type: Drill Hall

Location
- Location within London
- Coordinates: 51.52055°N 0.10656°W

Site history
- Built: 1887-1888
- Built for: War Office
- Architect: Alfred J. Hopkins
- In use: 1888-1967

The Farringdon Road drill hall is a former military installation at 57A Farringdon Road in Finsbury, London.

== History ==
The hall was designed by Alfred J. Hopkins as the headquarters for the 2nd City of London Rifle Volunteer Corps and built between 1887 and 1888. That unit became the 6th (City of London) Battalion The London Regiment (City of London Rifles) in 1908. The battalion was mobilised at the drill hall in August 1914 before being deployed to the Western Front. On the night of 8 September 1915, Zeppelin L13 commanded by Kapitänleutnant Heinrich Mathy attacked London, and two of his bombs hit Messrs Frank Stadelman's warehouse at 59–61 Farringdon Road. Falling masonry from the building did considerable damage to the drill hall behind. When the London Regiment was broken up and the battalion moved out to Sutton in its new role as an anti-aircraft unit in the mid 1930s, the hall fell vacant.

In 1947 the drill hall became the home of 167 (City of London) Field Ambulance and 168 (City of London) Field Ambulance Royal Army Medical Corps (TA). The hall had fallen vacant again by 1967 when the field ambulances went through a re-organisation and a new unit (217 (London) General Hospital) was formed at the Braganza Street drill hall in Walworth. Much of the site has since been converted to offices and is now used, among others, by Rufus Leonard, a firm of marketing consultants.

== Sources ==
- Godfrey, Captain E. G., (2002) The "Cast Iron Sixth": A History of the Sixth Battalion London Regiment (The City of London Rifles), London: Old Comrades' Association, 1935/Uckfield: Naval & Military Press, ISBN 1-84342-170-4.
- Morris, Captain Joseph, (2007) The German Air Raids on Great Britain 1914–1918, London, 1927/Stroud: Nonsuch, ISBN 1-84588-379-9.
