= Pauline Fanning =

Australian librarian (1915–2012)

Pauline Fanning (18 January 1915 – 24 April 2012) was an Australian librarian. Her career at the National Library of Australia spanned 40 years, during which time she overcame the marriage bar. Her work was highly regarded by historians, including Manning Clark and Geoffrey Blainey.

== Early life and education ==
Pauline Fanning was born in Hobart, Tasmania on 18 January 1915. She was the daughter of Muriel (née Gooch) and Bertram Henry Dixon. She completed her secondary education at the St Michael's Collegiate School in Hobart, before studying for a BA at the University of Tasmania, conferred in 1937.

== Career ==
Fanning joined the Commonwealth National Library as a trainee cataloguer in 1936. In 1941, following her marriage to Bill Fanning, who worked as a lawyer with the Attorney-General's Department, she was forced to retire due to the marriage ban. She subsequently was reemployed due to vacancies caused by World War II in the 1940s.

Fanning was given responsibility for the Australian collection in 1945.

Her first gazetted role was published in 1967, following the abolition of the marriage bar. She became principal librarian in 1972. In 1975 she was appointed director of the Australian Humanities Library, where she remained until her retirement in 1980.

Further roles included as consultant at the Parliamentary Library and contributor to the Australian National Dictionary, from which she finally retired at age 89.

== Death ==
Fanning died in Canberra on 24 April 2012.

== Honours and recognition ==
Fanning was appointed a Member of the British Empire in the 1969 Queen's Birthday Honours for "her service to the Chief Reference Librarian at the National Library". In the 1978 New Year Honours she was appointed a Companion of the Imperial Service Order for her service as Chief Librarian.

In 1977 she was awarded an Honorary Master of Arts by the Australian National University and was elected a Fellow of the Library Association of Australia.

Historians, including Manning Clark and Geoffrey Blainey, highly regarded the help she provided with their research.
