= Julie Warn =

Julie Anne Warn AM (born 13 August 1953) is an Australian academic and performing arts administrator.

Warn was born in Hobart, Tasmania, and studied at St Michael's Collegiate School and the University of Tasmania, before beginning her working career as an English and social science teacher at Cosgrove High School. She moved to Sydney to study stage production and management at the National Institute of Dramatic Art. Remaining in Sydney, she worked as a senior stage manager at the Sydney Theatre Company (1979–84), assistant general manager at Musica Viva Australia (1984–91); then returned to Tasmania as managing director of the Tasmanian Symphony Orchestra (1991–2001), and then CEO of The Queensland Orchestra (2001–04) in Brisbane.

Warn was made a Member of the Order of Australia in 2002 for her services to the arts through her work at the TSO.

In 2004, Warn was appointed as director of the Western Australian Academy of Performing Arts (WAAPA). In 2009, she was re-appointed, and promoted to professor. She retired in 2019.
