= Jean Nellie Miles Walker =

Australian army nurse (1878–1918)

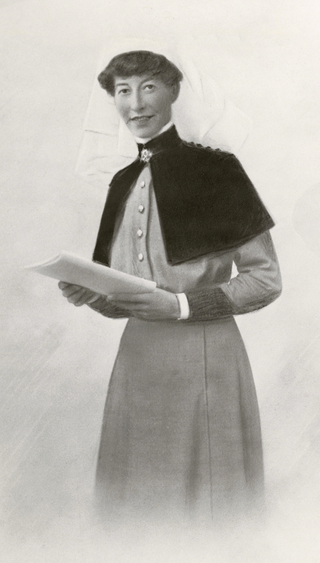
- Matron Jean Miles Walker, from the Australian War Memorial
- Born: 16 November 1878; Port Sorell, Tasmania
- Died: 30 October 1918 (aged 39); Sutton Veny, Wiltshire
- Cause of death: 1918 flu pandemic
- Military career
- Branch: Australian Army Nursing Service
- Service years: 1906-1918
- Awards: Royal Red Cross (1st class); 1914-15 Star; British War Medal; Victory Medal

Jean Nellie Miles Walker RRC, (16 November 1878 – 30 October 1918) was an Australian army nurse who served in Egypt during World War I. She was the only Tasmanian nurse to die on active service during World War I.

== Early life ==
Miles Walker was born at Port Sorell, Tasmania, the daughter of farmers Alfred Miles Walker and Louisa Mary Glover Wilkinson Walker. She attended St Michael's Collegiate School in Hobart as a girl.

Miles Walker trained as a nurse at Hobart General Hospital from 1903 to 1906. In 1913 she completed further training in obstetric nursing at Women's Hospital, Melbourne.

== Career as a nurse ==
Miles Walker was on staff at Hobart General Hospital after she finished her studies there, and worked as a matron in hospitals at Tallangatta, Victoria, and Darlington, New South Wales. In 1906 she joined the Australian Army Nursing Service. In November 1914, at the start of World War I, Miles Walker was one of the first 25 nurses who travelled to Egypt with the Australian Imperial Force. She was acting matron at the Mena House hospital in Cairo when the first casualties of Gallipoli arrived. She also served on a British hospital ship, Gascon, and as temporary matron at the Australian Stationary Hospital at Ismailia in Egypt. In October 1916, she began a stint as matron at the Australian Auxiliary Hospital at Dartford in England. She was awarded the Royal Red Cross (1st class) in January 1917 for her efforts. In July 1917, she travelled to Dieppe to be matron at the British Stationary Hospital there. Later that year, she was matron at Abbeville.

She returned to England in October 1918, where she worked at the military hospital in Sutton Veny, Wiltshire. She died there, part of the 1918 flu pandemic, on 30 October 1918, aged 39 years. Her remains were buried with full military honours in the St. John the Evangelist churchyard in Sutton Veny.

== Honours and memorials ==
Posthumous honours including the 1914-15 Star, the British War Medal and the Victory Medal were sent to her mother, who survived her.

Jean Miles Walker is represented on Panel 1888 of the Australian War Memorial in Canberra, on the Australian Army Nursing Service Plaque at Australian Army Museum Tasmania at Anglesea Barracks in Hobart, in a panel of the Roll of Honour Tablet as part of the Five Sisters window memorial at York Minster in Yorkshire, and in the Nurses' Memorial established in 1938 at Elizabeth Garrett Anderson and Obstetric Hospital in London.

She was the only Tasmanian nurse to die on active service during World War I. She was the only woman represented among the 535 plaques on Soldiers Memorial Avenue in Hobart.
