= Sutton Veny =

Village in Wiltshire, England

Coordinates: 51.179°N 2.148°W

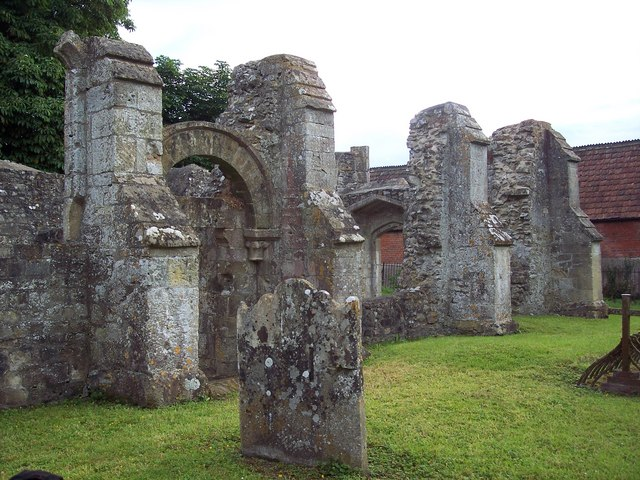
- St Leonard's Church

- Location within Wiltshire
- Population: 734 (in 2011)
- OS grid reference: ST898422
- Civil parish: Sutton Veny
- Unitary authority: Wiltshire
- Ceremonial county: Wiltshire
- Region: South West
- Country: England
- Sovereign state: United Kingdom
- Post town: Warminster
- Postcode district: BA12
- Dialling code: 01985
- Police: Wiltshire
- Fire: Dorset and Wiltshire
- Ambulance: South Western
- UK Parliament: South West Wiltshire
- Website: Community

Sutton Veny is a village and civil parish in the Wylye valley, to the southeast of the town of Warminster in Wiltshire, England; the village is about 3 miles (5 km) from Warminster town centre. 'Sutton' means 'south farmstead' in relation to Norton Bavant, one mile (1.6 km) to the north. 'Veny' may be a French family name or may describe the village's fenny situation. In 2011 the parish had a population of 734.

The parish is bounded in the northeast by the Wylye, and in the east includes part of the village of Tytherington. In 1885 when the small parish of Pertwood was extinguished, its northern section was transferred to Sutton Veny.

== History ==
=== Prehistory ===
The upper Wylye area has much evidence of Neolithic and early Bronze Age activity. There are several bowl barrows, one of them close to the east of the present village.

To the west of the village, by the Longbridge Deverill road, is the site of a henge which survives as an earthwork, 80m in diameter. It was noted by Sir Richard Colt Hoare and sketched by William Cunnington.

Robin Hood's Bower, in the middle of Southleigh wood, is an earthwork enclosure of uncertain date and purpose. Several Iron Age enclosures have been found on Cow Down, southwest of Sutton Veny village, including a D-shape bank and ditch, where partial excavation found evidence of a circular wooden hut.

=== Roman period ===
A Roman villa site with two buildings is at Pit Meads, near the Wylye in the north of the parish. The site of a Romano-British village is on Tytherington Hill, in the southeast.

=== Later ===
Domesday Book in 1086 recorded three manors at Sutone or Sudtone, with 43 households and a mill.

By 1294 there were two townships: Great Sutton around St Leonard's church, and Little Sutton to the west, towards Tytherington. From the 14th century to the 19th there was another hamlet called Newnham, northwest of the church.

Later landowners included the Hungerford family (from the 14th century) and Sir Stephen Fox (1680s), who sold the manors in lots.

The Great Western Railway opened their Salisbury branch line across the northeast of the parish in 1856, and Heytesbury station was nearby. That station closed in 1955 but the line and Warminster station remain open.

== Religious sites ==
=== Parish church ===
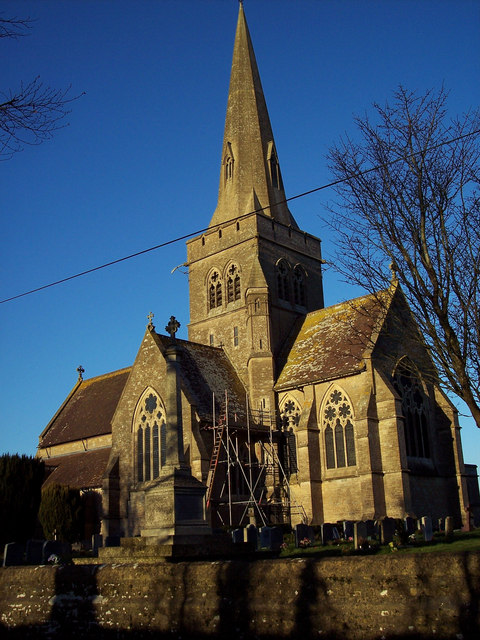
St John's Church

The parish church of St John the Evangelist was built in 1866-68 by J. L. Pearson, about 700 yards to the northwest of the ancient St Leonard's church, which had been damaged by subsidence. Pevsner writes that the newer church is "impressive, with its crossing tower and spire and its large five-light E and W windows"; he also notes the large rose window in the north transept and expresses delight at the stone rib-vaulting over the chancel and crossing, which he describes as Pearson's hallmark.

The church, which is built in Frome stone, was paid for by members of the Everett family in memory of Joseph Everett (d. 1865), who had built Sutton Veny House. The six bells were transferred from St Leonard's church; three are from the late 17th century and two from the 18th. The church was recorded as Grade I listed in 1986.

In the churchyard is a Portland stone war memorial in the shape of a cross, erected in 1920 with the names of 15 local servicemen who died during World War I; seven names were added after World War II. There is also an Australian War Graves cemetery, where 127 men of the Australian Military Forces were buried during the First World War, most dying in local hospitals of disease or from wounds. Among the graves is the burial place of Matron Jean Walker, the only Tasmanian nurse to die on active duty during that war; she succumbed to the flu pandemic in October 1918.

=== Former church ===
A church at Sutton Veny was first mentioned in 1220. St Leonard's church was built in the 13th century, incorporating a 12th-century doorway.

After it was replaced by St John's church in 1868 the chancel was used for a time as a mortuary chapel, while the nave was partly dismantled and fell into ruin. It was declared redundant in 1970 and is now in the care of the Churches Conservation Trust.

=== Notable rectors ===
Simon Sydenham, Dean of Salisbury and later Bishop of Chichester, was rector from 1417 to 1421.

=== Parish ===
The benefice was held in plurality with Norton Bavant from 1953. In 1976 the two parishes were united, together with the parish and benefice of Heytesbury with Tytherington and Knook. Today the parishes are among those served by the Upper Wylye Valley team.

=== Congregational chapel ===
A nonconformist chapel was built near Dymock's Lane in 1793, and a schoolroom added in 1818. Around 1800 there were three Sunday services, with 300 attending the evening service. Numbers dwindled in the 20th century and the chapel, which had been rebuilt in the later 19th century, was demolished in 1970.

== Notable buildings ==
Polebridge, a rambling former farmhouse near St Leonard's church, has at its core the great hall of a 14th-century house. The building was altered in the 17th century and extended in 1902. Nearby is the Grade II* listed former rectory known as the Old Manor House. Originally a 14th-century hall house, it was altered in the late 17th century and wings were added in the 1850s.

Greenhill House (now Sutton Veny House) was built in 1856 on the site of an earlier house, for Joseph Everett of Heytesbury. Standing in parkland and with formal gardens, the two-storey Regency-style ashlar house has a seven-window front, with a domed projection and Tuscan columns, and more columns form a verandah at the right side. Interior features such as the stairs, round-arched openings, panelling and fireplaces are in the style of the 17th and early 18th centuries. Lodges of similar date at the north and south entrances to the grounds have distyle in antis porticos. Renamed Sutton Veny House around the 1920s, since the 1980s it has been used as a nursing home.

Everett also built, in Tudor style, Greenhill Farm and a range of farm buildings and estate houses next to it along the Norton Bavant road.

== Military sites ==
Large areas of Salisbury Plain began to be used for army training from the late 19th century. Troops and equipment travelled by train, and being near Warminster and Heytesbury stations, Sutton Veny parish was the site of some of the many encampments.

=== First World War ===
The 60th (2/2nd London) Division of the Territorial Force, established in August 1914, had its headquarters at Sutton Veny until it was sent to France in June and July 1916; 88 trains conveyed the division to Southampton from camps around Warminster, Heytesbury, and Codford stations.

A hutted army hospital opened in the parish in 1916, with beds for 11 officers and 1,261 soldiers. After the armistice in November 1918, the 1st Australian General Hospital was transferred from France to Sutton Veny. Greenhill House was used by the YMCA as a headquarters and recreation centre. A 3.5-mile (5.6 km) railway line was built by the War Department from Heytesbury to the military camp; it was closed soon after the end of the war.

An internment camp for German prisoners of war was at Cooper's Bottom, north of Greenhill House, from 1916. A record made in February 1918 lists 131 civilian internees at Sutton Veny, engaged in work for the Royal Engineers.

=== Second World War ===
From 1943, Sutton Veny House was an army headquarters, and units of the United States Army were barracked in the area in preparation for the invasion of Normandy in June 1944.

A camp with brick huts was built to the west of the village, on both sides of the Longbridge Deverill road, just over the parish boundary. A 1958 map shows unlabelled groupings of small buildings. On modern maps the north side has reverted to farmland, but on the south most of the internal roads and some of the small buildings remain, and the area is a light industrial estate.

=== Today ===
Waterloo Lines at Warminster, about 2 miles (3.2 km) northwest of Sutton Veny, is an army headquarters and training site.

== Governance ==
The civil parish elects a parish council. It is in the area of Wiltshire Council unitary authority, which is responsible for all significant local government functions.

The village is represented in parliament by Andrew Murrison and in Wiltshire Council by Fleur de Rhé-Philipe, both Conservatives.

== Amenities ==
Sutton Veny and the small settlements around it are served by Sutton Veny C of E Primary School. The school was built in 1872, to a design by J. L. Pearson, and catered for all ages until 1931, when children over eleven were transferred to Warminster.

The village hall is next to the school. The village has a pub, the Woolpack.

The home ground of the Heytesbury and Sutton Veny Cricket Club is in Sutton Veny.

== Notable residents ==
- Sir Francis Lacey (1859–1946), cricketer and MCC secretary, first person to be knighted for services to any sport, lived at Sutton Veny House from 1922 until his death in 1946.
- Brigadier-General Reginald Hobbs (1878–1953), retired to Sutton Veny
- William Nicholson, the prominent artist, lived at the Old Manor House in the 1920s.
- George Elder Davie (1912–2007), Scottish philosopher, died at his daughter's house at Sutton Veny
- George Sassoon (1936–2006), scientist, electronic engineer, linguist, translator and author; inherited Heytesbury House, lived at Sutton Veny in later years
