= E. Jean Walker =

American academic

President of Virginia Highlands Community College
- In office 1974–1984
- Preceded by: Donald E. Puyear
- Succeeded by: N. Dewitt Moore

Personal details
- Education: Florida State University; University of Florida; Furman University

E. Jean Walker is an American academic, and the former President of Virginia Highlands Community College. Walker graduated with her bachelor's degree from Furman University in 1957. She received her master's degree from the University of Florida in 1959. In addition she received her Doctorate from Florida State University in 1968. In 1974 she was selected to be President of Virginia Highlands Community College, and she served in this position until 1984.
