= List of regiments of the Royal Artillery (1938–1947) =

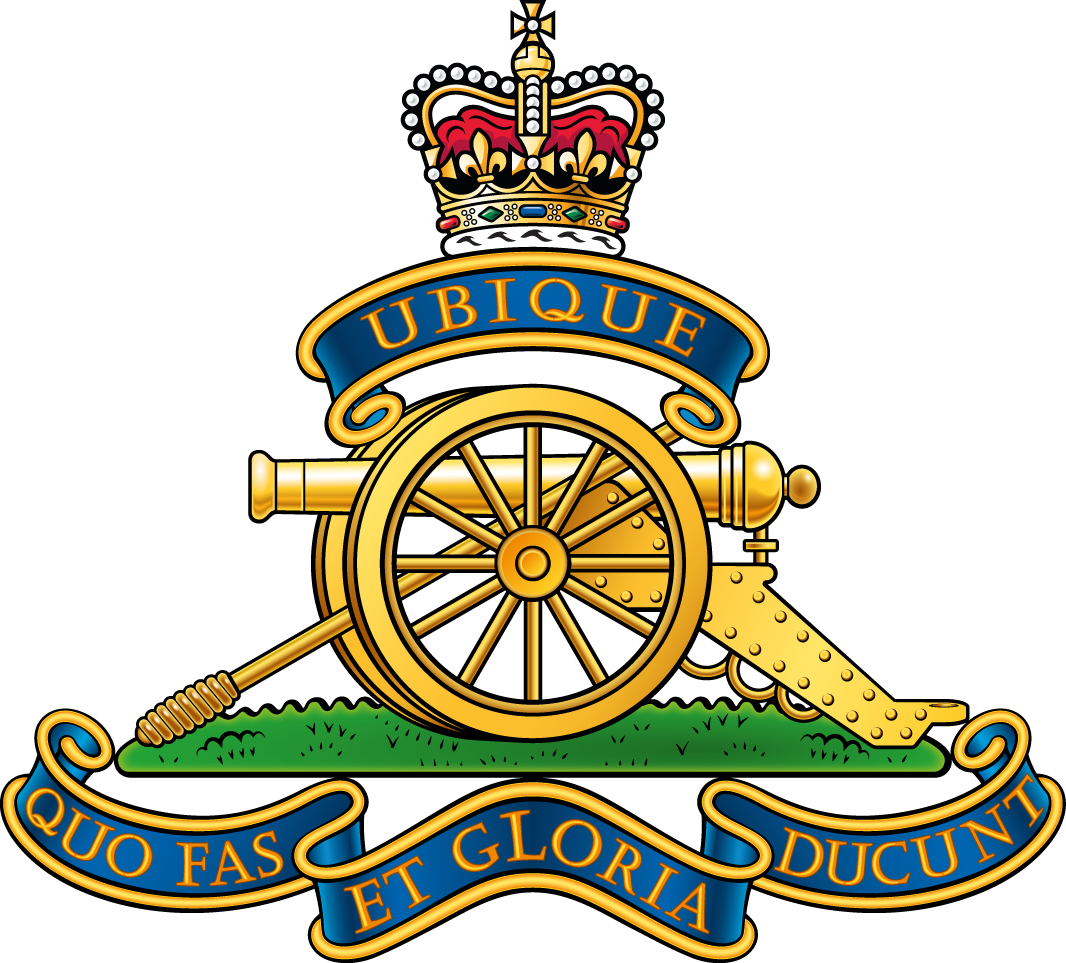
The insignia of the Royal Regiment of Artillery.

This list of regiments of the Royal Artillery covers the period from 1938, when the RA adopted the term 'regiment' rather than 'brigade' for a lieutenant-colonel's command comprising two or more batteries, to 1947 when all RA regiments were renumbered in a single sequence.

In 1938 the RA was organised in two main branches: Field, and Coast Defence and Anti-Aircraft (CD&AA) (including anti-tank). The two branches had separate depots and administrative staffs, but the main difference was in equipment and tactical employment. However, these differences broke down as World War II progressed, when units took on multiple roles, good examples being the employment of heavy anti-aircraft guns in the medium artillery and anti-tank roles.

In this list 'Reg' denotes a prewar unit of the Regular Army, 'SR' denotes Supplementary Reserve, 'TA' denotes Territorial Army, including duplicate units; all others were 'war-formed' (even if some were apparently designated TA). TA duplicate units were granted their subsidiary titles in February 1942. 'Mixed' indicates a unit in which a large proportion of the personnel were women of the Auxiliary Territorial Service. 'S/A' indicates an established Regular or TA unit placed in 'suspended animation' (as opposed to disbandment)

== Royal Horse Artillery ==
Traditionally the Royal Horse Artillery (RHA) provided highly mobile light field guns to support cavalry formations. By 1939 the RHA was – like the rest of the RA – completely mechanised, but its role remained essentially the same: provision of mobile artillery to armoured formations. As World War II progressed, this was increasingly achieved using Self-Propelled (SP) guns. The following regiments were designated RHA for all or part of the period:

- 1st Regiment Royal Horse Artillery (Reg)
- 2nd Regiment, Royal Horse Artillery (Reg)
- 3rd Regiment Royal Horse Artillery (Reg) – 3rd Ant-Tank Regiment, RHA, 1941–2
- 4th Regiment, Royal Horse Artillery (Reg)
- 5th Regiment, Royal Horse Artillery – formed November 1939
- 6th Regiment, Royal Horse Artillery – formed November 1940
- 11th Regiment, Royal Horse Artillery (Honourable Artillery Company) (TA)
- 12th Regiment, Royal Horse Artillery (Honourable Artillery Company) (TA)
- 13th Regiment, Royal Horse Artillery (Honourable Artillery Company) (TA)
- 14th Regiment, Royal Horse Artillery – formed November 1942, partly from an Essex Yeomanry Battery
- 104th (Essex Yeomanry) Regiment, Royal Horse Artillery (TA)
- 106th (Lancashire Hussars) Regiment, Royal Horse Artillery (TA) – converted to LAA March 1941
- 107th (South Nottinghamshire Hussars) Regiment, Royal Horse Artillery (TA) – captured June 1942, surviving battery transferred to 16th Medium Regiment
- 147th (Essex Yeomanry) Regiment, Royal Horse Artillery (TA) – converted to field artillery June 1940
- 149th (Lancashire Hussars) Regiment, Royal Horse Artillery (TA) – converted to field artillery June 1940
- 150th (South Nottinghamshire Hussars) Regiment, Royal Horse Artillery (TA) – converted to field artillery June 1940

== Field ==
The field regiments were the backbone of the Royal Artillery, mostly operating as integral components of the infantry and armoured divisions, with a few held at corps or army level (later in the Army Groups Royal Artillery).

- 1st Field Regiment, Royal Artillery (Reg)
- 2nd Field Regiment, Royal Artillery (Reg)
- 3rd Field Regiment, Royal Artillery (Reg)
- 4th Field Regiment, Royal Artillery (Reg)
- 5th Field Regiment, Royal Artillery (Reg) – captured February 1942; reformed from 187th Field Regiment June 1943
- 6th Field Regiment, Royal Artillery (Reg) – disbanded July 1940; reformed from 189th Field Regiment January 1943
- 7th Field Regiment, Royal Artillery (Reg)
- 8th Field Regiment, Royal Artillery (Reg) – organised as a Jungle Field Regiment between March 1943 and July 1944
- 9th Field Regiment, Royal Artillery (Reg)
- 10th Field Regiment, Royal Artillery (Reg)
- 11th Field Regiment, Royal Artillery (Reg)
- 12th Field Regiment, Royal Artillery (Reg) – converted to 17th Medium Regiment November 1943
- 15th Field Regiment, Royal Artillery (Reg)
- 16th Field Regiment, Royal Artillery (Reg)
- 17th Field Regiment, Royal Artillery (Reg)
- 18th Field Regiment, Royal Artillery (Reg)
- 19th Field Regiment, Royal Artillery (Reg)
- 22nd Field Regiment, Royal Artillery (Reg)
- 23rd Field Regiment, Royal Artillery (Reg)
- 24th Field Regiment, Royal Artillery (Reg)
- 25th Field Regiment, Royal Artillery (Reg) – captured June 1942; reformed from 177th Field Regiment March 1944
- 27th Field Regiment, Royal Artillery (Reg) – organised as a Jungle Field Regiment between January 1943 and April 1944
- 28th Field Regiment, Royal Artillery (Reg) – organised as a Jungle Field Regiment between July 1943 and July 1944
- 30th Field Regiment, Royal Artillery (Reg)
- 31st Field Regiment, Royal Artillery (Reg)
- 32nd Field Regiment, Royal Artillery (Reg) – converted to 32nd Heavy Regiment September 1943; reverted May 1945
- 33rd Field Regiment, Royal Artillery (Reg)
- 51st (Westmorland and Cumberland) Field Regiment, Royal Artillery (TA) – amalgamated with 69th Anti-Tank Regiment as 51st/69th Infantry Regiment
- 52nd (Manchester) Field Regiment, Royal Artillery (TA)
- 53rd (Bolton) Field Regiment, Royal Artillery (TA)
- 55th (Wessex) Field Regiment, Royal Artillery (TA)
- 57th (Home Counties) Field Regiment, Royal Artillery (TA)
- 58th (Sussex) Field Regiment, Royal Artillery (TA) – converted to 84th (Sussex) Medium Regiment December 1943
- 60th (North Midland) Field Regiment, Royal Artillery (TA) – converted to 60th (North Midland) Infantry Regiment in Chindits March 1944; S/A October 1944
- 61st (North Midland) Field Regiment, Royal Artillery (TA) – converted to 61st (North Midland) Super Heavy Regiment December 1944
- 64th (7th London) Field Regiment, Royal Artillery (TA)
- 65th (8th London) Field Regiment, Royal Artillery (TA) – S/A June 1945
- 67th (South Midland) Field Regiment, Royal Artillery (TA)
- 68th (South Midland) Field Regiment, Royal Artillery (TA)
- 69th (West Riding) Field Regiment, Royal Artillery (TA)
- 70th (West Riding) Field Regiment, Royal Artillery (TA)
- 71st (West Riding) Field Regiment, Royal Artillery (TA)
- 72nd (Northumbrian) Field Regiment, Royal Artillery (TA)
- 74th (Northumbrian) Field Regiment, Royal Artillery (TA)
- 75th (Highland) Field Regiment, Royal Artillery (TA) – converted to 75th (Highland) Heavy Regiment September 1943
- 76th (Highland) Field Regiment, Royal Artillery (TA)
- 77th (Highland) Field Regiment, Royal Artillery (TA)
- 78th (Lowland) Field Regiment, Royal Artillery (TA) – converted to 178th (Lowland) Medium Regiment May 1944
- 79th (Lowland) Field Regiment, Royal Artillery (TA)
- 80th (Lowland – City of Glasgow) Field Regiment, Royal Artillery (TA)
- 81st (Welsh) Field Regiment, Royal Artillery (TA)
- 83rd (Welsh) Field Regiment, Royal Artillery (TA)
- 85th (East Anglian) Field Regiment, Royal Artillery (TA) – converted to 85th (East Anglian) Mountain Regiment September 1943
- 86th (East Anglian) (Hertfordshire Yeomanry) Field Regiment, Royal Artillery (TA)
- 87th (1st West Lancashire) Field Regiment, Royal Artillery (TA)
- 88th (2nd West Lancashire) Field Regiment, Royal Artillery (TA) – captured December 1941
- 90th (City of London) Field Regiment, Royal Artillery (TA)
- 91st (4th London) Field Regiment, Royal Artillery (TA)
- 92nd (5th London) Field Regiment, Royal Artillery (TA)
- 94th (Queen's Own Dorset Yeomanry) Field Regiment, Royal Artillery (TA)
- 96th (Royal Devon Yeomanry) Field Regiment, Royal Artillery (TA)
- 97th (Kent Yeomanry) Field Regiment, Royal Artillery (TA)
- 98th (Surrey & Sussex Yeomanry Queen Mary's) Field Regiment, Royal Artillery (TA)
- 99th (Buckinghamshire Yeomanry) Field Regiment, Royal Artillery (TA)
- 102nd (Pembroke and Cardiganshire) Field Regiment, Royal Artillery (TA)
- 105th (Bedfordshire Yeomanry) Field Regiment, Royal Artillery (TA) – converted to 52nd (Bedfordshire Yeomanry) Heavy Regiment November 1939
- 109th (Westmorland and Cumberland) Field Regiment, Royal Artillery (TA)
- 110th (Manchester) Field Regiment, Royal Artillery (TA)
- 111th (Bolton) Field Regiment, Royal Artillery (TA)
- 112th (Wessex) Field Regiment, Royal Artillery (TA)
- 113th (Home Counties) Field Regiment, Royal Artillery (TA)
- 114th (Sussex) Field Regiment, Royal Artillery (TA) – organised as a Jungle Field Regiment between October 1943 and July 1944
- 115th (North Midland) Field Regiment, Royal Artillery (TA)
- 116th (North Midland) Field Regiment, Royal Artillery (TA) – S/A January 1945
- 117th (7th London) Field Regiment, Royal Artillery (TA)
- 118th Field Regiment, Royal Artillery (TA) – captured February 1942
- 119th (South Midland) Field Regiment, Royal Artillery (TA)
- 120th (South Midland) Field Regiment, Royal Artillery (TA)
- 121st (West Riding) Field Regiment, Royal Artillery (TA) – converted to 121st (West Riding) Medium Regiment January 1944
- 122nd Field Regiment, Royal Artillery (TA) – captured February 1942
- 123rd (West Riding) Field Regiment, Royal Artillery (TA) – organised as a Parachute Field Regiment between November 1944 and September 1945
- 124th (Northumbrian) Field Regiment, Royal Artillery (TA)
- 125th Field Regiment, Royal Artillery (TA) – converted to 125th Anti-Tank Regiment July 1940
- 126th (Highland) Field Regiment, Royal Artillery (TA)
- 127th (Highland) Field Regiment, Royal Artillery (TA)
- 128th (Highland) Field Regiment, Royal Artillery (TA)
- 129th (Lowland) Field Regiment, Royal Artillery (TA)
- 130th (Lowland) Field Regiment, Royal Artillery (TA) organised as 130th (Lowland) Assault Field Regiment, Royal Artillery August 1943
- 131st (Lowland – City of Glasgow) Field Regiment, Royal Artillery (TA)
- 132nd (Welsh) Field Regiment, Royal Artillery (TA)
- 133rd (Welsh) Field Regiment, Royal Artillery (TA)
- 134th (East Anglian) Field Regiment, Royal Artillery (TA) – organised as a Jungle Field Regiment between October 1943 and July 1944; converted to 134th (East Anglian) Medium Regiment October 1944
- 135th (East Anglian) (Hertfordshire Yeomanry) Field Regiment, Royal Artillery (TA) – captured February 1942
- 136th (1st West Lancashire) Field Regiment, Royal Artillery (TA)
- 137th Field Regiment, Royal Artillery (TA)– captured February 1942
- 138th (City of London) Field Regiment, Royal Artillery (TA)
- 139th (4th London) Field Regiment, Royal Artillery (TA) – organised as a Jungle Field Regiment between October 1943 and July 1944
- 140th (5th London) Field Regiment, Royal Artillery (TA) – converted to 140th (5th London) Medium Regiment September 1943
- 141st (Queen's Own Dorset Yeomanry) Field Regiment, Royal Artillery (TA)
- 142nd (Royal Devon Yeomanry) Field Regiment, Royal Artillery (TA)
- 143rd (Kent Yeomanry) Field Regiment, Royal Artillery (TA)
- 144th (Surrey & Sussex Yeomanry Queen Mary's) Field Regiment, Royal Artillery (TA)
- 145th (Berkshire Yeomanry) Field Regiment, Royal Artillery (TA)
- 146th (Pembroke and Cardiganshire) Field Regiment, Royal Artillery (TA) – converted to 146th (Pembroke and Cardiganshire) Medium Regiment September 1943
- 147th (Essex Yeomanry) Field Regiment, Royal Artillery (TA) – converted from RHA June 1940
- 148th (Bedfordshire Yeomanry) Field Regiment, Royal Artillery (TA) – captured February 1942
- 149th (Lancashire Hussars) Field Regiment, Royal Artillery (TA) – converted from RHA January 1941
- 150th (South Nottinghamshire Hussars) Field Regiment, Royal Artillery (TA) – converted from RHA 1940
- 151st (Ayrshire Yeomanry) Field Regiment, Royal Artillery (TA) – converted from cavalry February 1940
- 152nd (Ayrshire Yeomanry) Field Regiment, Royal Artillery (TA) – formed April 1940
- 153rd (Leicestershire Yeomanry) Field Regiment, Royal Artillery (TA) – converted from cavalry February 1940
- 154th (Leicestershire Yeomanry) Field Regiment, Royal Artillery (TA) – formed April 1940
- 155th (Lanarkshire Yeomanry) Field Regiment, Royal Artillery (TA) – converted from cavalry February 1940; captured February 1942
- 156th (Lanarkshire Yeomanry) Field Regiment, Royal Artillery (TA) – formed April 1940
- 157th Field Regiment, Royal Artillery – formed December 1940; disbanded June 1942
- 158th Field Regiment, Royal Artillery – formed January 1941; organised as a Jungle Field Regiment between September 1943 and July 1944
- 159th Field Regiment, Royal Artillery – formed April 1941; converted to 159th Parachute Light Regiment November 1944
- 160th Field Regiment, Royal Artillery – formed July 1941; organised as a Jungle Field Regiment between September 1943 and July 1944
- 161st Field Regiment, Royal Artillery – formed September 1941; absorbed into 160th Field Regiment April 1942
- 162nd (East Africa) Field Regiment, Royal Artillery – formed April 1942; redesignated 303rd (East Africa) Field Regiment April 1943
- 163rd Field Regiment, Royal Artillery – formed June 1942; disbanded March 1944
- 164th Field Regiment, Royal Artillery – converted from 79th Anti-Tank Regiment June 1942; disbanded August 1942
- 165th Field Regiment, Royal Artillery – converted from 83rd Anti-Tank Regiment May 1942; disbanded December 1944
- 166th (Newfoundland) Field Regiment, Royal Artillery – converted from 57th (Newfoundland) Heavy Regiment November 1941
- 167th Field Regiment, Royal Artillery – formed March 1942; disbanded February 1943
- 168th Field Regiment, Royal Artillery – formed December 1941; converted to 168th Medium Regiment December 1943
- 169th Field Regiment, Royal Artillery – formed after December 1941; disbanded February 1943
- 170th Field Regiment, Royal Artillery – formed December 1941; disbanded March 1944
- 171st Field Regiment, Royal Artillery – converted from 2nd Defence Regiment January 1942; converted to 171st Heavy Regiment February 1945, reverted May 1945
- 172nd Field Regiment, Royal Artillery – converted from 3rd Defence Regiment January 1942
- 173rd Field Regiment, Royal Artillery – converted from 7th Defence Regiment January 1942; disbanded March 1943; reformed from 180th Field Regiment July 1943; disbanded January 1945
- 174th Field Regiment, Royal Artillery – converted from 8th Defence Regiment January 1942; disbanded March 1943
- 175th Field Regiment, Royal Artillery – converted from 10th Defence Regiment January 1942; disbanded February 1943 to form 15th Medium Regiment; reformed July 1943
- 176th Field Regiment, Royal Artillery – converted from 11th Defence Regiment January 1942
- 177th Field Regiment, Royal Artillery – converted from 14th Defence Regiment January 1942; disbanded March 1943 to reform 25th Field Regiment
- 178th Field Regiment, Royal Artillery – formed January 1942, redesignated 178th Assault Field Regiment, Royal Artillery August 1943
- 179th Field Regiment, Royal Artillery – converted from 12th Bn, Worcestershire Regiment March 1942
- 180th Field Regiment, Royal Artillery – converted from 8th Bn North Staffordshire Regiment March 1942, disbanded August 1944
- 181st Field Regiment, Royal Artillery – converted from 6th Bn King's Shropshire Light Infantry March 1942
- 182nd Field Regiment, Royal Artillery – converted from 12th Bn, Royal Warwickshire Regiment February 1942, disbanded December 1944
- 183rd Field Regiment, Royal Artillery – converted from 10th Bn South Staffordshire Regiment March 1942, converted to 61st Heavy Regiment November 1944
- 184th Field Regiment, Royal Artillery – converted from 14th Bn King's Regiment (Liverpool) March 1942, converted to 55th Heavy Regiment March 1943
- 185th Field Regiment, Royal Artillery – formed December 1942, personnel from 49th (West Riding) Infantry Division, disbanded January 1945
- 186th Field Regiment, Royal Artillery – formed December 1942
- 187th Field Regiment, Royal Artillery – formed December 1942, personnel from 3rd Infantry Division, disbanded June 1943 to reform 5th Field Regiment
- 188th Field Regiment, Royal Artillery – formed December 1942, personnel from 43rd (Wessex) Infantry Division, disbanded January 1944
- 189th Field Regiment, Royal Artillery – formed December 1942, disbanded January 1943 to reform 6th Field Regiment
- 190th Field Regiment, Royal Artillery – formed December 1942, personnel from 9th Armoured Division
- 191st (Hertfordshire and Essex Yeomanry) Field Regiment, Royal Artillery – formed December 1942, personnel from 42nd Armoured Division, disbanded January 1945
- 192nd Field Regiment, Royal Artillery – formed December 1942, disbanded March 1944
- 193rd Field Regiment, Royal Artillery – formed December 1942, personnel from 79th Armoured Division, disbanded January 1944
- 194th Field Regiment, Royal Artillery – formed December 1942, disbanded January 1944
- 195th Field Regiment, Royal Artillery – formed January 1943
- 199th Field Regiment, Royal Artillery – formed July 1943, disbanded November 1943
- 200th Field Regiment, Royal Artillery – initially 'A' Jewish Field Regiment, formed December 1944
- 202nd Field Regiment, Royal Artillery – formed May 1945, disbanded September 1945
- 203rd Field Regiment, Royal Artillery – formed May 1945, disbanded September 1945
- 205th Field Regiment, Royal Artillery – formed May 1945, disbanded September 1945
- 208th Field Regiment, Royal Artillery – converted from 88th Medium Regiment April 1945

== Anti-Tank ==
Specialist Anti-Tank (A/T) regiments began to be formed by conversion from other roles in 1938.

- 3rd Anti-Tank Regiment, Royal Horse Artillery (Reg) – 3rd Regiment, RHA converted from 1941 to 1942
- 13th Anti-Tank Regiment, Royal Artillery (Reg)
- 14th Anti-Tank Regiment, Royal Artillery (Reg)
- 20th Anti-Tank Regiment, Royal Artillery (Reg)
- 21st Anti-Tank Regiment, Royal Artillery (Reg)
- 24th Anti-Tank Regiment, Royal Artillery (TA) – converted from 24th LAA/AT Regiment September 1944
- 26th Anti-Tank Regiment, Royal Artillery (Reg)– converted to 13th Mobile Coast Defence Regiment September 1940
- 33rd Anti-Tank Regiment, Royal Artillery (TA) – converted from 33rd LAA/AT Regiment September 1944
- 51st (West Highland) Anti-Tank Regiment, Royal Artillery (TA) – captured June 1940
- 52nd (6th London) Anti-Tank Regiment, Royal Artillery (TA)
- 53rd (Worcestershire and Oxfordshire Yeomanry) Anti-Tank Regiment, Royal Artillery (TA) – converted to 53rd (Worcestershire Yeomanry) Air Landing Light Regiment November 1943
- 54th (Queen’s Own Royal Glasgow Yeomanry) Anti-Tank Regiment, Royal Artillery (TA)
- 55th (Suffolk Yeomanry) Anti-Tank Regiment, Royal Artillery (TA)
- 56th (King's Own) Anti-Tank Regiment, Royal Artillery (TA) – converted to 56th (King's Own) LAA/AT Regiment August 1943, reverted to A/T September 1944
- 57th (East Surrey) Anti-Tank Regiment, Royal Artillery (TA)
- 58th (Duke of Wellington's Regiment) Anti-Tank Regiment, Royal Artillery (TA)
- 59th (Duke of Connaught's Hampshire) Anti-Tank Regiment, Royal Artillery (TA)
- 60th (Royal Welch Fusiliers) Anti-Tank Regiment, Royal Artillery (TA) – converted to 101st LAA/AT Regiment February 1940; reverted April 1944
- 61st (West Highland) Anti-Tank Regiment, Royal Artillery (TA)
- 62nd (6th London) Anti-Tank Regiment, Royal Artillery (TA)
- 63rd (Worcestershire and Oxfordshire Yeomanry) Anti-Tank Regiment, Royal Artillery (TA) – later dropped Worcestershire and from subtitle
- 64th (Queen's Own Royal Glasgow Yeomanry) Anti-Tank Regiment, Royal Artillery (TA)
- 65th (Norfolk Yeomanry) Anti-Tank Regiment, Royal Artillery (TA)
- 66th (King's Own) Anti-Tank Regiment, Royal Artillery (TA)
- 67th (East Surrey) Anti-Tank Regiment, Royal Artillery (TA)
- 68th (Duke of Wellington's Regiment) Anti-Tank Regiment, Royal Artillery (TA) – S/A November 1944
- 69th (Duke of Connaught's) Anti-Tank Regiment, Royal Artillery (TA)– converted to 69th LAA/AT Regiment July 1943
- 70th (Royal Welch Fusiliers) Anti-Tank Regiment, Royal Artillery (TA)
- 71st Anti-Tank Regiment, Royal Artillery – formed September 1940
- 72nd Anti-Tank Regiment, Royal Artillery – formed November 1940
- 73rd Anti-Tank Regiment, Royal Artillery – formed November 1940
- 74th Anti-Tank Regiment, Royal Artillery – formed November 1940, disbanded December 1943
- 75th Anti-Tank Regiment, Royal Artillery – formed November 1940
- 76th (Royal Welch Fusiliers) Anti-Tank Regiment, Royal Artillery – converted from 101st LAA/AT Regiment November 1940, renumbered 60th (RWF) A/T Regiment April 1944
- 77th Anti-Tank Regiment, Royal Artillery – formed June 1942, disbanded February 1943
- 78th Anti-Tank Regiment, Royal Artillery – formed July 1942, disbanded December 1943
- 79th Anti-Tank Regiment, Royal Artillery – formed October 1941
- 80th Anti-Tank Regiment, Royal Artillery – formed July 1941, captured February 1942
- 81st Anti-Tank Regiment, Royal Artillery – formed September 1941, disbanded April 1945
- 82nd Anti-Tank Regiment, Royal Artillery – formed September 1941, converted to 82nd LAA/AT Regiment November 1942, reverted September 1944
- 83rd Anti-Tank Regiment, Royal Artillery – formed September 1941, disbanded December 1944
- 84th Anti-Tank Regiment, Royal Artillery – formed September 1941, disbanded July 1944
- 85th Anti-Tank Regiment, Royal Artillery – formed September 1941, captured February 1942
- 86th (5th Devon) Anti-Tank Regiment, Royal Artillery (TA) – converted from 5th (Prince of Wales's) Bn, Devonshire Regiment November 1941
- 87th (Devon) Anti-Tank Regiment, Royal Artillery (TA)– converted from 7th (Haytor) Bn, Devonshire Regiment November 1941
- 88th (Manchester Regiment) Anti-Tank Regiment, Royal Artillery (TA)– converted from 2/9th Bn, Manchester Regiment, November 1941; converted to 88th Training Regiment June 1945
- 89th (Liverpool Scottish) Anti-Tank Regiment, Royal Artillery (TA) – converted from 2nd Bn, Liverpool Scottish, November 1941
- 90th Anti-Tank Regiment, Royal Artillery – converted from 9th Bn, King's Own Royal Regiment (Lancaster), December 1941, disbanded December 1943
- 91st (Argyll & Sutherland Highlanders) Anti-Tank Regiment, Royal Artillery (TA) – converted from 5th (Renfrewshire) Bn A&SH, November 1941
- 92nd (Gordon Highlanders) Anti-Tank Regiment, Royal Artillery (TA) – converted from 4th (City of Aberdeen) Bn, Gordon Highlanders, November 1941
- 93rd (Argyll & Sutherland Highlanders) Anti-Tank Regiment, Royal Artillery (TA) – converted from 6th (Renfrewshire) Bn A&SH, November 1941
- 94th Anti-Tank Regiment, Royal Artillery – converted from 22nd Bn, Royal Fusiliers, December 1941, disbanded December 1944
- 95th Anti-Tank Regiment, Royal Artillery – converted from 73rd Medium Regiment October 1941; reverted April 1944
- 96th Anti-Tank Regiment, Royal Artillery – formed July 1942
- 97th Anti-Tank Regiment, Royal Artillery – formed July 1942
- 98th Anti-Tank Regiment, Royal Artillery – converted from 19th Bn, Royal Fusiliers, November 1942, disbanded January 1944
- 99th Anti-Tank Regiment, Royal Artillery – converted from 7th Bn, King's Shropshire Light Infantry, November 1942, disbanded December 1943
- 100th (Gordon Highlanders) Anti-Tank Regiment, Royal Artillery (TA) – converted from 8th (City of Aberdeen) Bn, Gordon Highlanders, November 1941; converted to 100th LAA/AT Regiment January 1944, reverted September 1944
- 101st Anti-Tank Regiment, Royal Artillery – converted from 8th Bn, Lincolnshire Regiment, December 1942, disbanded July 1943
- 102nd (Northumberland Hussars) Anti-Tank Regiment, Royal Artillery (TA) – converted from 102nd (Northumberland Hussars) LAA/AT Regiment March 1941
- 103rd Anti-Tank Regiment, Royal Artillery – converted from 14th Bn, South Staffordshire Regiment, December 1942, disbanded August 1943

(No 104th formed)

- 105th Anti-Tank Regiment, Royal Artillery – formed December 1942, disbanded April 1945
- 106th Anti-Tank Regiment, Royal Artillery – formed June 1943, disbanded April 1945
- 107th Anti-Tank Regiment, Royal Artillery – formed June 1943, disbanded April 1945

(No 108th–110th formed)

- 111th (Devon) Anti-Tank Regiment, Royal Artillery (TA) – converted from 55th (Devon) LAA/AT Regiment September 1944

(No 112th–121st formed)

- 122nd (Royal Warwickshire Regiment) Anti-Tank Regiment, Royal Artillery (TA) – converted from 122nd (Royal Warwickshire Regiment) LAA/AT Regiment September 1944
- 125th (Northumbrian) Anti-Tank Regiment, Royal Artillery (TA) – converted from 125th (Northumbrian) Field Regiment July 1940, captured February 1942
- 149th (Lancashire Yeomanry) Anti-Tank Regiment, Royal Artillery (TA) – converted from 149th (Lancashire Yeomanry) Field Regiment July 1941

== Medium ==
Medium regiments:

- 1st Medium Regiment, Royal Artillery (Reg)
- 2nd Medium Regiment, Royal Artillery (Reg)
- 3rd Medium Regiment, Royal Artillery (Reg)
- 4th Medium Regiment, Royal Artillery (Reg)
- 5th Medium Regiment, Royal Artillery (Reg)
- 6th Medium Regiment, Royal Artillery (Reg)
- 7th Medium Regiment Royal Artillery (Reg)
- 8th Medium Regiment, Royal Artillery – formed September 1941
- 9th Medium Regiment, Royal Artillery – converted from 8th Bn Buffs (Royal East Kent Regiment), December 1942
- 10th Medium Regiment, Royal Artillery – converted from 16th Bn Royal Fusiliers, December 1942
- 11th Medium Regiment, Royal Artillery – converted from 9th Bn Essex Regiment, December 1942
- 12th Medium Regiment, Royal Artillery – formed January 1943
- 13th Medium Regiment, Royal Artillery – formed January 1943
- 14th Medium Regiment, Royal Artillery – converted from 8th Bn Bedfordshire and Hertfordshire Regiment, December 1942
- 15th Medium Regiment, Royal Artillery – converted from 175th Field Regiment February 1943, disbanded January 1945
- 16th Medium Regiment, Royal Artillery – formed January 1943 including remnant of 107th (SNH) Regiment RHA; redesignated 107th (SNH) Medium Regiment (TA) March 1944
- 17th Medium Regiment, Royal Artillery – converted from 12th Field Regiment (Reg) November 1943
- 18th Medium Regiment, Royal Artillery – converted from 18th Defence Regiment November 1943, disbanded February 1945
- 26th Medium Regiment, Royal Artillery – converted from 26th Defence Regiment September 1943
- 51st (Midland) Medium Regiment, Royal Artillery (TA)
- 53rd (London) Medium Regiment, Royal Artillery (TA)
- 56th (Highland) Medium Regiment, Royal Artillery (TA)
- 57th (Lowland) Medium Regiment, Royal Artillery (TA) – converted to 51st Heavy Regiment September 1939
- 58th (Suffolk) Medium Regiment, Royal Artillery (TA)
- 59th (4th West Lancashire) Medium Regiment, Royal Artillery (TA)
- 61st Carnarvon and Denbigh (Yeomanry) Medium Regiment, Royal Artillery (TA)
- 62nd (Scottish) Medium Regiment, Royal Artillery (TA) – converted to Fife Heavy Regiment 1939
- 63rd (Midland) Medium Regiment, Royal Artillery (TA) – formed 1939
- 64th (London) Medium Regiment, Royal Artillery (TA) – formed 1939
- 65th (Highland) Medium Regiment, Royal Artillery (TA) – formed 1939
- 66th (Lowland) Medium Regiment, Royal Artillery (TA) – formed 1939
- 67th (Suffolk) Medium Regiment, Royal Artillery (TA) – formed 1939
- 68th (4th West Lancashire) Medium Regiment, Royal Artillery (TA) – formed 1939
- 69th Carnarvon and Denbigh (Yeomanry) Medium Regiment, Royal Artillery (TA) – formed 1939
- 70th Medium Regiment, Royal Artillery – formed January 1940
- 71st Medium Regiment, Royal Artillery – formed January 1940, disbanded February 1943
- 72nd Medium Regiment, Royal Artillery – formed January 1940
- 73rd Medium Regiment, Royal Artillery – formed January 1940, converted to 95th A/T Regiment October 1941, reverted April 1944
- 74th Medium Regiment, Royal Artillery – formed January 1940
- 75th (Shropshire Yeomanry) Medium Regiment, Royal Artillery (TA) – converted from cavalry February 1940
- 76th (Shropshire Yeomanry) Medium Regiment, Royal Artillery (TA) – formed April 1940
- 77th (Duke of Lancaster's Own Yeomanry) Medium Regiment, Royal Artillery (TA) – converted from cavalry February 1940
- 78th (Duke of Lancaster's Own Yeomanry) Medium Regiment, Royal Artillery (TA) – formed April 1940; converted to 78th (Auxiliary Police) Regiment, Royal Artillery (Duke of Lancaster's Own Yeomanry) October 1945
- 79th (Scottish Horse Yeomanry) Medium Regiment, Royal Artillery (TA) – converted from cavalry February 1940
- 80th (Scottish Horse Yeomanry) Medium Regiment, Royal Artillery (TA) – formed April 1940
- 84th (Sussex) Medium Regiment, Royal Artillery (TA) – converted from 58th (Sussex) Field Regiment December 1943
- 85th (City of London) Medium Regiment, Royal Artillery (TA) – converted from 53rd (City of London) HAA Regiment August 1944
- 86th (Cornwall) Medium Regiment, Royal Artillery (TA) – converted from 56th (Cornwall) HAA Regiment August 1944
- 87th Medium Regiment, Royal Artillery – formed August 1944, disbanded 1945
- 88th Medium Regiment, Royal Artillery – formed November 1944, converted to 208th Field Regiment April 1945
- 102nd (Pembroke Yeomanry) Medium Regiment, Royal Artillery (TA) – converted from 102nd (Pembroke and Cardiganshire) Field Regiment September 1943
- 107th (South Nottinghamshire Hussars Yeomanry) Medium Regiment, Royal Artillery (TA) – redesignated from 16th Medium Regiment March 1944
- 121st (West Riding) Medium Regiment, Royal Artillery (TA) – converted from 121st (West Riding) Field Regiment January 1944
- 134th (East Anglian) Medium Regiment, Royal Artillery (TA) – converted from 134th (East Anglian) Jungle Field Regiment October 1944
- 140th (5th London) Medium Regiment, Royal Artillery (TA) – converted from 140th (5th London) Field Regiment September 1943, S/A February 1945
- 146th (Pembroke and Cardiganshire) Medium Regiment, Royal Artillery (TA) – converted from 146th (Pembroke and Cardiganshire) Field Regiment December 1943
- 168th Medium Regiment, Royal Artillery – converted from 168th Field Regiment November 1943; converted to 168th Light Regiment June 1945
- 178th (Lowland) Medium Regiment, Royal Artillery (TA) – converted from 178th (Lowland) Field Regiment May 1944

== Heavy (Field Army) ==
Regiments of mobile heavy guns for employment in the field.

- 1st Heavy Regiment, Royal Artillery (Reg) – S/A June 1940, reformed December 1942
- 32nd Heavy Regiment, Royal Artillery– converted from 32nd Field Regiment (Reg) September 1943, reverted May 1945
- 51st (Lowland) Heavy Regiment, Royal Artillery (TA) – converted from 57th (Lowland) Medium Regiment September 1939
- 52nd (Bedfordshire Yeomanry) Heavy Regiment, Royal Artillery (TA) – converted from 105th (BY) Field Regiment November 1939, disbanded June 1940, reformed March 1943
- 53rd Heavy Regiment, Royal Artillery – formed December 1939
- 54th Heavy Regiment, Royal Artillery – formed December 1939, converted to 54th Super Heavy Regiment February 1945
- 55th Heavy Regiment, Royal Artillery – converted from 184th Field Regiment March 1943
- 56th Heavy Regiment, Royal Artillery – formed January 1940
- 57th (Newfoundland) Heavy Regiment, Royal Artillery – formed April 1940, converted to 166th (Newfoundland) Field Regiment November 1941
- 58th Heavy Regiment, Royal Artillery – formed April 1940, disbanded March 1943
- 59th (Newfoundland) Heavy Regiment, Royal Artillery – formed June 1940, disbanded August 1945
- 60th Heavy Regiment, Royal Artillery – formed July 1943, disbanded November 1943
- 61st Heavy Regiment, Royal Artillery – converted from 183rd Field Regiment November 1943
- 75th (Highland) Heavy Regiment, Royal Artillery (TA) – converted from 75th (Highland) Field Regiment September 1943
- 171st Heavy Regiment, Royal Artillery – converted from 171st Field Regiment February 1945, reverted May 1945

== Super Heavy ==
Regiments of super heavy guns (8-inch and 240 mm) for employment in the field.

- 1st Super Heavy Regiment, Royal Artillery – formed November 1940, disbanded December 1941
- 2nd Super Heavy Regiment, Royal Artillery – formed November 1940, disbanded February 1945
- 3rd Super Heavy Regiment, Royal Artillery – formed November 1940
- 54th Super Heavy Regiment, Royal Artillery – converted from 54th Heavy Regiment February 1945
- 61st (North Midland) Super Heavy Regiment, Royal Artillery (TA) – converted from 61st (North Midland) Field Regiment December 1944

== Pack, Mountain and Light ==
=== Pack/Mountain Regiments ===
- 1st Mountain Regiment Royal Artillery - Formed December 1940 as 1st Pack Regiment, redesignated 1 Mountain Regiment January 1941
- 2nd Mountain Regiment Royal Artillery - Formed March 1941
- 3rd Mountain Regiment Royal Artillery - Formed December 1942, disbanded January 1946
- 7th Mountain Regiment Royal Artillery - Formed October 1943 as X Mountain Regiment but soon numbered. Disbanded November 1945
- 85th (East Anglian) Mountain Regiment Royal Artillery (TA) - Converted from 85th Field Regiment September 1943. Suspended animation September 1945

=== Light Regiments ===
- 1st Light Regiment Royal Artillery - Converted from 1st Mountain Regiment October 1944, reverted to 1st Mountain Regiment March 1945
- 5th Light Regiment Royal Artillery - Converted from 5th Field Regiment June 1945, disbanded October 1945
- 168th Light Regiment Royal Artillery - Converted from 168th Medium Regiment June 1945, disbanded February 1946

== Air Landing and Parachute ==
- 1st Airlanding Light Regiment, Royal Artillery
- 53rd (Worcestershire Yeomanry) Airlanding Light Regiment, Royal Artillery
- 1st Air Landing Anti-Tank Regiment, Royal Artillery
- 2nd Air Landing Anti-Tank Regiment, Royal Artillery
- 123rd Parachute Field Regiment, Royal Artillery - Converted to parachute role from November 1944 to September 1945
- 159th Parachute Light Regiment, Royal Artillery
- 23rd Parachute Light Anti-Aircraft/Anti-Tank Regiment, Royal Artillery

== Survey ==
Survey regiments were initially organised into Survey, Sound Ranging and Flash Spotting batteries. Later this was changed to a troop of each in each battery.

- 1st Survey Regiment, Royal Artillery (Reg) – formed May 1939
- 2nd Survey Regiment, Royal Artillery (Reg) – formed September 1939
- 3rd Survey Regiment, Royal Artillery (TA) – expanded from single company November 1938
- 4th (Durham) Survey Regiment, Royal Artillery (TA) – expanded from single company November 1938
- 5th Survey Regiment, Royal Artillery (TA) – formed 1939
- 6th Survey Regiment, Royal Artillery (TA) – formed 1939, disbanded July 1940
- 7th Survey Regiment, Royal Artillery – formed January 1941
- 8th Survey Regiment, Royal Artillery – formed February 1941
- 9th Survey Regiment, Royal Artillery – formed March 1941
- 10th Survey Regiment, Royal Artillery – formed December 1942
- 11th Survey Regiment, Royal Artillery – formed December 1942

== Coast Defence ==
=== Heavy Regiments (Coast) ===
Regiments of static heavy guns for coast defence, converted to numbered coast regiments in 1940–41:

- 2nd Heavy Regiment, Royal Artillery (Reg) – converted to 70th Coast Training Regiment November 1940
- 3rd Heavy Regiment, Royal Artillery (Reg) – redesignated as 3rd Coast Regiment January 1941
- 4th Heavy Regiment, Royal Artillery (Reg) – redesignated as 4th Coast Regiment December 1940
- 5th Heavy Regiment, Royal Artillery (Reg) – formed September 1939, redesignated as 5th Coast Regiment December 1940
- 6th Heavy Regiment, Royal Artillery (Reg) – redesignated as 6th Coast Regiment December 1940
- 7th Heavy Regiment, Royal Artillery (Reg) – redesignated as 7th Coast Regiment December 1940
- 8th Heavy Regiment, Royal Artillery (Reg) – redesignated as 8th Coast Regiment December 1940
- 9th Heavy Regiment, Royal Artillery (Reg) – redesignated as 9th Coast Regiment December 1940
- 11th Heavy Regiment, Royal Artillery – formed October 1939, redesignated as 11th Coast Regiment December 1940
- 12th Heavy Regiment, Royal Artillery – formed November 1939, redesignated as 12th Coast Regiment December 1940
- Sierra Leone Heavy Regiment, Royal Artillery (Reg) – formed July 1939, redesignated as Sierra Leone Coast Regiment December 1940
- Clyde Heavy Regiment, Royal Artillery (TA) – reorganised as 538th (Clyde) Coast Regiment January 1941
- Cornwall Heavy Regiment, Royal Artillery – formed January 1940, reorganised as 523rd (Cornwall) Coast Regiment July 1940
- Devonshire Heavy Regiment, Royal Artillery (TA) – reorganised as 566th, 567th and 568th (Devon) Coast Regiments April 1941
- Dorsetshire Heavy Regiment, Royal Artillery (TA) – reorganised as 522nd (Dorsetshire) Coast Regiment July 1940
- Durham Heavy Regiment, Royal Artillery (TA) – reorganised as 511th and 526th (Durham) Coast Regiments July 1940
- East Riding Heavy Regiment, Royal Artillery (TA) – reorganised as 512th and 513th (East Riding) Coast Regiments July 1940
- Fife Heavy Regiment, Royal Artillery (TA) – reorganised as 504th and 507th (Fife) Coast Regiments July 1940
- Forth Heavy Regiment, Royal Artillery (TA) – reorganised as 501st, 502nd, 503rd, 505th and 506th (Forth) Coast Regiments July 1940
- Glamorgan Heavy Regiment, Royal Artillery (TA) – reorganised as 531st (Glamorgan) Coast Regiment September 1940
- Hampshire Heavy Regiment, Royal Artillery (TA) – reorganised as 527th, 528th and 529th (Hampshire) Coast Regiments September 1940
- Kent and Sussex Heavy Regiment, Royal Artillery (TA) – reorganised as 519th, 520th and 521st (Kent and Sussex) Coast Regiments July 1940
- Lancashire and Cheshire Heavy Regiment, Royal Artillery (TA) – reorganised as 524th (Lancashire and Cheshire) Coast Regiment July 1940
- Orkney Heavy Regiment, Royal Artillery (TA) – formed November 1938; reorganised as 533rd, 534th and 535th (Orkney) Coast Regiments September 1940
- Pembrokeshire Heavy Regiment, Royal Artillery (TA) – reorganised as 532nd (Pembroke) Coast Regiment September 1940
- Princess Beatrice's (Isle of Wight) Heavy Regiment, Royal Artillery (TA) – reorganised as 530th Princess Beatrice's (Isle of Wight) Coast Regiment September 1940
- Suffolk Heavy Regiment, Royal Artillery (TA) – reorganised as 514th and 515th (Suffolk) Coast Regiments July 1940
- Thames and Medway Heavy Regiment, Royal Artillery (TA) – reorganised as 516th, 517th and 518th (Thames and Medway) Coast Regiments July 1940
- Tynemouth Heavy Regiment, Royal Artillery (TA) – reorganised as 508th, 509th and 510th (Tynemouth) Coast Regiments July 1940
- Antrim Heavy Regiment, Royal Artillery (TA) – expanded from single battery March 1940; reorganised as 525th (Antrim) Coast Regiment July 1940

=== Coast Regiments ===
Regiments of static heavy guns for coast defence.

- 3rd Coast Regiment, Royal Artillery (Reg) – redesignated from 3rd Heavy Regiment January 1941
- 4th Coast Regiment, Royal Artillery (Reg) – redesignated from 4th Heavy Regiment December 1940; converted to 4th Coast Training Regiment June 1945
- 5th Coast Regiment, Royal Artillery (Reg) – redesignated from 5th Heavy Regiment December 1940; converted to 1st HAA Reginent, HKSA, March 1944
- 6th Coast Regiment, Royal Artillery (Reg) – redesignated from 6th Heavy Regiment December 1940
- 7th Coast Regiment, Royal Artillery (Reg) – redesignated from 7th Heavy Regiment December 1940; captured February 1942
- 8th Coast Regiment, Royal Artillery (Reg) – redesignated from 8th Heavy Regiment December 1940; captured December 1941
- 9th Coast Regiment, Royal Artillery (Reg) – redesignated from 9th Heavy Regiment December 1940; captured February 1942
- 10th Mobile Coast Defence Regiment, Royal Artillery – formed October 1939, 'Defence' dropped from title December 1940, converted to 16th Defence Regiment February 1941
- 11th Coast Regiment, Royal Artillery – redesignated from 11th Heavy Regiment December 1940; captured February 1942
- 12th Coast Regiment, Royal Artillery – redesignated from 12th Heavy Regiment December 1940; captured February 1942
- 13th Mobile Coast Defence Regiment, Royal Artillery (Reg) – converted from 26th A/T Regiment September 1940, 'Defence' dropped from title December 1940, converted to 17th Defence Regiment February 1941
- 14th Coast Regiment, Royal Artillery – formed March 1941, disbanded July 1945
- 15th Coast Regiment, Royal Artillery – formed December 1940, disbanded March 1945
- Sierra Leone Coast Regiment, Royal Artillery (Reg) – redesignated as 16th Coast Regiment June 1941
- 17th Coast Regiment, Royal Artillery – formed September 1941, converted to 17 Fire Command Post July 1943, disbanded July 1944
- X Coast Regiment, Royal Artillery – formed January 1943, redesignated as 18th Coast Regiment March 1943, disbanded February 1944
- 19th Coast Regiment, Royal Artillery – converted from Close Defence Regiment March 1943, disbanded March 1944
- 501st (Forth) Coast Regiment, Royal Artillery (TA) – converted from part of Forth Heavy Regiment July 1940, S/A June 1945
- 502nd (Forth) Coast Regiment, Royal Artillery (TA) – converted from part of Forth Heavy Regiment July 1940, S/A March 1941
- 503rd (Forth) Coast Regiment, Royal Artillery (TA) – converted from part of Forth Heavy Regiment July 1940, S/A March 1941
- 504th (Fife) Coast Regiment, Royal Artillery (TA) – converted from part of Fife Heavy Regiment July 1940, S/A April 1944
- 505th (Forth) Coast Regiment, Royal Artillery (TA) – converted from part of Forth Heavy Regiment July 1940
- 506th (Forth) Coast Regiment, Royal Artillery (TA) – converted from part of Forth Heavy Regiment July 1940, S/A April 1944
- 507th (Fife) Coast Regiment, Royal Artillery (TA) – converted from part of Forth Heavy Regiment July 1940, S/A May 1942
- 508th (Tynemouth) Coast Regiment, Royal Artillery (TA) – converted from part of Tynemouth Heavy Regiment July 1940, converted to 616th (Tynemouth) Infantry Regiment January 1945
- 509th (Tynemouth) Coast Regiment, Royal Artillery (TA) – converted from part of Tynemouth Heavy Regiment July 1940, S/A April 1944
- 510th (Tynemouth) Coast Regiment, Royal Artillery (TA) – converted from part of Tynemouth Heavy Regiment July 1940, S/A October 1944
- 511th (Durham) Coast Regiment, Royal Artillery (TA) – converted from part of Durham Heavy Regiment July 1940, S/A March 1943
- 512th (East Riding) Coast Regiment, Royal Artillery (TA) – converted from part of East Riding Heavy Regiment July 1940, converted to 617th (East Riding) Infantry Regiment January 1945
- 513th (East Riding) Coast Regiment, Royal Artillery (TA) – converted from part of East Riding Heavy Regiment July 1940, S/A April 1944
- 514th (Suffolk) Coast Regiment, Royal Artillery (TA) – converted from part of Suffolk Heavy Regiment July 1940, S/A June 1945
- 515th (Suffolk) Coast Regiment, Royal Artillery (TA) – converted from part of Suffolk Heavy Regiment July 1940
- 516th (Thames and Medway) Coast Regiment, Royal Artillery (TA) – converted from part of Thames & Medway Heavy Regiment July 1940, converted to 516 Garrison Regiment December 1944
- 517th (Thames and Medway) Coast Regiment, Royal Artillery (TA) – converted from part of Thames & Medway Heavy Regiment July 1940, S/A June 1945
- 518th (Thames and Medway) Coast Regiment, Royal Artillery (TA) – converted from part of Thames & Medway Heavy Regiment July 1940, disbanded October 1941
- 519th (Kent and Sussex) Coast Regiment, Royal Artillery (TA) – converted from part of Kent & Sussex Heavy Regiment July 1940
- 520th (Kent and Sussex) Coast Regiment, Royal Artillery (TA) – converted from part of Kent & Sussex Heavy Regiment July 1940
- 521st (Kent and Sussex) Coast Regiment, Royal Artillery (TA) – converted from part of Kent & Sussex Heavy Regiment July 1940, S/A June 1945
- 522nd (Dorsetshire) Coast Regiment, Royal Artillery (TA) – converted from Dorsetshire Heavy Regiment July 1940, converted to 618th (Dorsetshire) Infantry Regiment January 1945
- 523rd (Cornwall) Coast Regiment, Royal Artillery (TA) – converted from Cornwall Heavy Regiment July 1940
- 524th (Lancashire and Cheshire) Coast Regiment, Royal Artillery (TA) – converted from Lancashire & Cheshire Heavy Regiment July 1940, converted to 619th (Lancashire & Cheshire) Infantry Regiment January 1945
- 525th (Antrim) Coast Regiment, Royal Artillery (TA) – converted from Antrim Heavy Regiment July 1940, S/A June 1945
- 526th (Durham) Coast Regiment, Royal Artillery (TA) – converted from part of Durham Heavy Regiment July 1940, S/A June 1945
- 527th (Hampshire) Coast Regiment, Royal Artillery (TA) – converted from part of Hampshire Heavy Regiment September 1940
- 528th (Hampshire) Coast Regiment, Royal Artillery (TA) – converted from part of Hampshire Heavy Regiment September 1940, disbanded December 1942
- 529th (Hampshire) Coast Regiment, Royal Artillery (TA) – converted from part of Hampshire Heavy Regiment September 1940, S/A April 1944
- 530th The Princess Beatrice's (Isle of Wight Rifles) Coast Regiment, Royal Artillery (TA) – converted from part of Princess Beatrice's (IoW Rifles) Heavy Regiment September 1940
- 531st (Glamorgan) Coast Regiment, Royal Artillery (TA) – converted from Glamorgan Heavy Regiment September 1940, disbanded December 1942
- 532nd (Pembroke) Coast Regiment, Royal Artillery (TA) – converted from Pembrokeshire Heavy Regiment September 1940, converted to 620th (Pembroke) Infantry Regiment January 1945
- 533rd (Orkney) Coast Regiment, Royal Artillery (TA) – converted from part of Orkney Heavy Regiment September 1940
- 534th (Orkney) Coast Regiment, Royal Artillery (TA) – converted from part of Orkney Heavy Regiment September 1940, S/A June 1945
- 535th (Orkney) Coast Regiment, Royal Artillery (TA) – converted from part of Orkney Heavy Regiment September 1940, S/A June 1945
- 536th Coast Regiment, Royal Artillery – formed November 1940, disbanded June 1942
- 537th Coast Regiment, Royal Artillery – formed December 1940, disbanded April 1944
- 538th (Clyde) Coast Regiment, Royal Artillery (TA) – converted from Clyde Heavy Regiment January 1941
- 539th Coast Regiment, Royal Artillery – formed January 1941, disbanded March 1943
- 540th Coast Regiment, Royal Artillery – formed February 1941, disbanded June 1945
- 541st Coast Regiment, Royal Artillery – converted from 1st Coast Artillery Group June 1941, disbanded June 1945
- 542nd Coast Regiment, Royal Artillery – converted from 2nd Coast Artillery Group June 1941, disbanded April 1944
- 543rd Coast Regiment, Royal Artillery – converted from 3rd Coast Artillery Group June 1941, disbanded April 1944
- 544th Coast Regiment, Royal Artillery – converted from 5th Coast Artillery Group June 1941, disbanded June 1945
- 545th Coast Regiment, Royal Artillery – converted from 7th Coast Artillery Group June 1941 disbanded April 1944
- 546th Coast Regiment, Royal Artillery – converted from 8th Coast Artillery Group June 1941, disbanded April 1944
- 547th Coast Regiment, Royal Artillery – converted from 9th Coast Artillery Group June 1941, disbanded April 1944
- 548th Coast Regiment, Royal Artillery – converted from 10th Coast Artillery Group June 1941, disbanded April 1944
- 549th Coast Regiment, Royal Artillery – converted from 11th Coast Artillery Group June 1941, disbanded June 1945
- 550th Coast Regiment, Royal Artillery – converted from 12th Coast Artillery Group June 1941, disbanded April 1944
- 551st Coast Regiment, Royal Artillery – converted from 13th Coast Artillery Group June 1941, disbanded April 1944
- 552nd Coast Regiment, Royal Artillery – converted from 14th Coast Artillery Group June 1941, disbanded April 1944
- 553rd Coast Regiment, Royal Artillery – converted from 15th Coast Artillery Group June 1941, disbanded April 1944
- 554th Coast Regiment, Royal Artillery – converted from 16th Coast Artillery Group June 1941, disbanded April 1944
- 555th Coast Regiment, Royal Artillery – converted from 17th Coast Artillery Group June 1941, disbanded April 1944
- 556th Coast Regiment, Royal Artillery – converted from 18th Coast Artillery Group June 1941, disbanded June 1945
- 557th Coast Regiment, Royal Artillery – converted from 19th Coast Artillery Group June 1941, disbanded April 1944
- 558th Coast Regiment, Royal Artillery – converted from 20th Coast Artillery Group June 1941, disbanded November 1942
- 559th Coast Regiment, Royal Artillery – converted from 21st Coast Artillery Group June 1941, disbanded April 1944
- 560th Coast Regiment, Royal Artillery – converted from 22nd Coast Artillery Group June 1941, disbanded July 1942
- 561st Coast Regiment, Royal Artillery – converted from 23rd Coast Artillery Group June 1941, disbanded May 1943
- 562nd Coast Regiment, Royal Artillery – converted from 24th Coast Artillery Group June 1941, disbanded June 1945
- 563rd Coast Regiment, Royal Artillery – converted from 25th Coast Artillery Group June 1941, disbanded April 1944
- 564th Coast Regiment, Royal Artillery – converted from 26th Coast Artillery Group June 1941, disbanded September 1942
- 565th Coast Regiment, Royal Artillery – formed May 1941, disbanded February 1942
- 566th (Devon and Cornwall) Coast Regiment, Royal Artillery (TA) – converted from part of Devon Heavy Regiment April 1941
- 567th (Devon) Coast Regiment, Royal Artillery (TA) – converted from part of Devon Heavy Regiment April 1941, S/A April 1944
- 568th (Devon) Coast Regiment, Royal Artillery (TA) – converted from part of Devon Heavy Regiment April 1941S/A May 1943
- 569th Coast Regiment, Royal Artillery – formed December 1941, disbanded February 1943
- 570th Coast Regiment, Royal Artillery – converted from Flat Holme Fire Defence December 1941, disbanded June 1945
- 571st Coast Regiment, Royal Artillery – converted from Brean Down Fire Defence December 1941, disbanded April 1944
- 572nd Coast Regiment, Royal Artillery – formed from part of 515th (Suffolk) Coast Regiment March 1942, disbanded April 1944
- 573rd Coast Regiment, Royal Artillery – formed May 1943
- 574th Coast Regiment, Royal Artillery – formed May 1943
- 575th Coast Regiment, Royal Artillery – converted from Y Coast Regiment, formed April 1943, disbanded November 1944

=== Defence Regiments ===
During the invasion crisis of 1940 a number of temporary 'Defence' batteries and regiments were formed to deploy around the UK coast for general defence, though not forming part of coast artillery proper; others were formed at overseas ports.

- 1st Defence Regiment, Royal Artillery – formed October 1940, disbanded March 1941
- 2nd Defence Regiment, Royal Artillery – formed October 1940, converted to 171st Field Regiment January 1942
- 3rd Defence Regiment, Royal Artillery – formed October 1940, converted to 172nd Field Regiment January 1942
- 4th Defence Regiment, Royal Artillery – formed October 1940, disbanded April 1941
- 5th Defence Regiment, Royal Artillery – formed October 1940, disbanded January 1942
- 6th Defence Regiment, Royal Artillery – formed October 1940, disbanded April 1941
- 7th Defence Regiment, Royal Artillery – formed October 1940, converted to 173rd Field Regiment January 1942
- 8th Defence Regiment, Royal Artillery – formed October 1940, converted to 174th Field Regiment January 1942
- 9th Defence Regiment, Royal Artillery – formed October 1940, disbanded January 1942
- 10th Defence Regiment, Royal Artillery – formed October 1940, converted to 175th Field Regiment January 1942
- 11th Defence Regiment, Royal Artillery – formed October 1940, converted to 176th Field Regiment January 1942
- 12th Defence Regiment, Royal Artillery – formed October 1940, disbanded January 1942
- 13th Defence Regiment, Royal Artillery – formed October 1940, disbanded April 1941
- 14th Defence Regiment, Royal Artillery – formed October 1940, converted to 177th Field Regiment January 1942
- 15th Defence Regiment, Royal Artillery – formed October 1940, disbanded April 1941
- 16th Defence Regiment, Royal Artillery – redesignated from 10th Mobile Coast Defence Regiment February 1941, captured February 1942
- 17th Defence Regiment, Royal Artillery – redesignated from 13th Mobile Coast Defence Regiment February 1941, redesignated 26th Defence Regiment June 1941; converted to 26th Medium Regiment October 1943
- 18th Defence Regiment, Royal Artillery – redesignated from Mobile Coast Defence Regiment April 1941; converted to 18th Medium Regiment January 1944
- 805th Defence Regiment, Royal Artillery – formed October 1943, disbanded November 1943

== Anti-Aircraft ==
=== Heavy Anti-Aircraft ===
Originally, these units were simply entitled 'Anti-Aircraft' (AA), but in 1940 they were redesignated 'Heavy Anti-Aircraft' (HAA) to distinguish them from the Light AA units being formed. The great majority were disbanded or passed into S/A between August 1945 and January 1947

- 1st Heavy Anti-Aircraft Regiment, Royal Artillery (Reg)
- 2nd Heavy Anti-Aircraft Regiment, Royal Artillery (Reg)
- 3rd Heavy Anti-Aircraft Regiment, Royal Artillery (Reg) – captured February 1942
- 4th Heavy Anti-Aircraft Regiment, Royal Artillery (Reg)
- 5th Heavy Anti-Aircraft Regiment, Royal Artillery (Reg) – captured December 1941
- 6th Heavy Anti-Aircraft Regiment, Royal Artillery (Reg) – captured March 1942
- 7th Heavy Anti-Aircraft Regiment, Royal Artillery (Reg)
- 8th (Belfast) Heavy Anti-Aircraft Regiment, Royal Artillery (SR)
- 9th (Londonderry) Heavy Anti-Aircraft Regiment, Royal Artillery (SR) – S/A September 1944
- 10th Heavy Anti-Aircraft Regiment, Royal Artillery – formed December 1939, disbanded to reform 68th (North Midland) HAA Regiment June 1944
- 11th Heavy Anti-Aircraft Regiment Royal Malta Artillery
- 12th Heavy Anti-Aircraft Regiment, Royal Artillery – formed February 1941, disbanded May 1944, reformed from 177th HAA Regiment May 1944
- 13th Heavy Anti-Aircraft Regiment, Royal Artillery – formed March 1941, disbanded December 1942
- 51st (London) Heavy Anti-Aircraft Regiment, Royal Artillery (TA)
- 52nd (London) Heavy Anti-Aircraft Regiment, Royal Artillery (TA)
- 53rd (City of London) Heavy Anti-Aircraft Regiment, Royal Artillery (TA) – converted to 85th (City of London) Medium Regiment August 1944
- 54th (City of London) Heavy Anti-Aircraft Regiment, Royal Artillery (TA)
- 55th (Kent) Heavy Anti-Aircraft Regiment, Royal Artillery (TA)
- 56th (Cornwall) Heavy Anti-Aircraft Regiment, Royal Artillery (TA) – converted to 86th (Cornwall) Medium Regiment July 1944
- 57th (Wessex) Heavy Anti-Aircraft Regiment, Royal Artillery (TA)
- 58th (Kent) Heavy Anti-Aircraft Regiment, Royal Artillery (TA)
- 59th (Essex Regiment) Heavy Anti-Aircraft Regiment, Royal Artillery (TA)
- 60th (City of London) Heavy Anti-Aircraft Regiment, Royal Artillery (TA)
- 61st (Middlesex) Heavy Anti-Aircraft Regiment, Royal Artillery (TA)
- 62nd (Northumbrian) Heavy Anti-Aircraft Regiment, Royal Artillery (TA)
- 63rd (Northumbrian) Heavy Anti-Aircraft Regiment, Royal Artillery (TA) – converted to battery in 87th Medium Regiment August 1944
- 64th (Northumbrian) Heavy Anti-Aircraft Regiment, Royal Artillery (TA)
- 65th (The Manchester Regiment) Heavy Anti-Aircraft Regiment, Royal Artillery (TA)
- 66th (Leeds Rifles) (West Yorkshire Regiment) Heavy Anti-Aircraft Regiment, Royal Artillery (TA)
- 67th (York and Lancaster Regiment) Heavy Anti-Aircraft Regiment, Royal Artillery (TA)
- 68th (North Midland) Heavy Anti-Aircraft Regiment, Royal Artillery (TA) – captured June 1942; reformed from 10th HAA Regiment June 1943
- 69th (Royal Warwickshire Regiment) Heavy Anti-Aircraft Regiment, Royal Artillery (TA) – S/A January 1945
- 70th (3rd West Lancashire) Heavy Anti-Aircraft Regiment, Royal Artillery (TA) – converted to battery in 87th Medium Regiment August 1944
- 71st (Forth) Heavy Anti-Aircraft Regiment, Royal Artillery (TA)
- 72nd (Hampshire) Heavy Anti-Aircraft Regiment, Royal Artillery (TA – S/A January 1945)
- 73rd Heavy Anti-Aircraft Regiment, Royal Artillery (TA) – S/A March 1945
- 74th (City of Glasgow) Heavy Anti-Aircraft Regiment, Royal Artillery (TA) – S/A November 1944
- 75th (Home Counties) (Cinque Ports) Heavy Anti-Aircraft Regiment, Royal Artillery (TA) – S/A July 1944
- 76th (Gloucestershire) Heavy Anti-Aircraft Regiment, Royal Artillery (TA)
- 77th (Welsh) Heavy Anti-Aircraft Regiment, Royal Artillery (TA) – captured March 1942
- 78th (1st East Anglian) Heavy Anti-Aircraft Regiment, Royal Artillery (TA) – S/A December 1944
- 79th (Hertfordshire Yeomanry) Heavy Anti-Aircraft Regiment, Royal Artillery (TA) – S/A March 1945
- 80th (Berkshire) Heavy Anti-Aircraft Regiment, Royal Artillery (TA) – S/A December 1944
- 81st Heavy Anti-Aircraft Regiment, Royal Artillery (TA) – S/A August 1944
- 82nd (Essex) Heavy Anti-Aircraft Regiment, Royal Artillery (TA)
- 83rd (Blythswood) Heavy Anti-Aircraft Regiment, Royal Artillery (TA) – S/A September 1944
- 84th (Middlesex, London Transport) Heavy Anti-Aircraft Regiment, Royal Artillery (TA) – S/A November 1944
- 85th (Tees) Heavy Anti-Aircraft Regiment, Royal Artillery (TA) – S/A October 1944
- 86th (Honourable Artillery Company) Heavy Anti-Aircraft Regiment, Royal Artillery (TA)
- 87th Heavy Anti-Aircraft Regiment, Royal Artillery (TA) – formed April 1939, S/A November 1944
- 88th Heavy Anti-Aircraft Regiment, Royal Artillery (TA) – formed April 1939, S/A September 1944
- 89th Heavy Anti-Aircraft Regiment, Royal Artillery (TA) – formed April 1939, S/A September 1944
- 90th Heavy Anti-Aircraft Regiment, Royal Artillery (TA) – formed April 1939
- 91st Heavy Anti-Aircraft Regiment, Royal Artillery (TA) – formed March 1939, S/A July 1944

(No 92nd HAA Regiment formed)

- 93rd Heavy Anti-Aircraft Regiment, Royal Artillery (TA) – formed April 1939, S/A August 1944
- 94th Heavy Anti-Aircraft Regiment, Royal Artillery (TA) – formed April 1939, S/A July 1944
- 95th (Birmingham) Heavy Anti-Aircraft Regiment, Royal Artillery (TA) – formed April 1939, S/A March 1944
- 96th Heavy Anti-Aircraft Regiment, Royal Artillery (TA) – formed April 1939, S/A June 1944
- 97th (London Scottish) Heavy Anti-Aircraft Regiment, Royal Artillery (TA) – formed April 1939, converted to 97th (London Scottish) Garrison Regiment November 1944
- 98th Heavy Anti-Aircraft Regiment, Royal Artillery (TA) – formed April 1939, S/A April 1944
- 99th (London Welsh) Heavy Anti-Aircraft Regiment, Royal Artillery (TA) – formed April 1939
- 100th Heavy Anti-Aircraft Regiment, Royal Artillery (TA) – formed April 1939, S/A August 1944
- 101st Heavy Anti-Aircraft Regiment, Royal Artillery (TA) – formed August 1939, S/A August 1944
- 102nd Heavy Anti-Aircraft Regiment, Royal Artillery (TA) – formed August 1939, S/A January 1944
- 103rd Heavy Anti-Aircraft Regiment, Royal Artillery – formed May 1940
- 104th Heavy Anti-Aircraft Regiment, Royal Artillery – formed August 1940
- 105th Heavy Anti-Aircraft Regiment, Royal Artillery – formed September 1940
- 106th Heavy Anti-Aircraft Regiment, Royal Artillery – formed August 1940, disbanded September 1944
- 107th Heavy Anti-Aircraft Regiment, Royal Artillery – formed September 1940
- 108th Heavy Anti-Aircraft Regiment, Royal Artillery – formed August 1940
- 109th Heavy Anti-Aircraft Regiment, Royal Artillery – formed August 1940
- 110th Heavy Anti-Aircraft Regiment, Royal Artillery – formed October 1940
- 111th Heavy Anti-Aircraft Regiment, Royal Artillery – formed October 1940
- 112th Heavy Anti-Aircraft Regiment, Royal Artillery – formed October 1940
- 113th Heavy Anti-Aircraft Regiment, Royal Artillery – formed November 1940, disbanded May 1945
- 114th (Composite) Heavy Anti-Aircraft Regiment, Royal Artillery – formed November 1940; converted to 151st LAA Regiment May 1943
- 115th Heavy Anti-Aircraft Regiment, Royal Artillery– formed November 1940
- 116th Heavy Anti-Aircraft Regiment, Royal Artillery – formed November 1940
- 117th Heavy Anti-Aircraft Regiment, Royal Artillery – formed December 1940; became 622nd Infantry Regiment January 1945, disbanded June 1945
- 118th Heavy Anti-Aircraft Regiment, Royal Artillery – formed December 1940
- 119th Heavy Anti-Aircraft Regiment, Royal Artillery – formed December 1940
- 120th Heavy Anti-Aircraft Regiment, Royal Artillery – formed January 1941, disbanded June 1944
- 121st Heavy Anti-Aircraft Regiment, Royal Artillery – formed January 1941
- 122nd Heavy Anti-Aircraft Regiment, Royal Artillery – formed February 1941
- 123rd Heavy Anti-Aircraft Regiment, Royal Artillery – formed February 1941; converted to 16th (East Africa) HAA, East African Artillery, June 1943
- 124th Heavy Anti-Aircraft Regiment, Royal Artillery – formed March 1941
- 125th Heavy Anti-Aircraft Regiment, Royal Artillery – formed March 1941, disbanded December 941
- 126th Heavy Anti-Aircraft Regiment, Royal Artillery – formed July 1941
- 127th Heavy Anti-Aircraft Regiment, Royal Artillery – formed August 1941
- 128th Heavy Anti-Aircraft Regiment, Royal Artillery – formed August 1941
- 129th (Mixed) Heavy Anti-Aircraft Regiment, Royal Artillery – formed August 1941
- 130th (Mixed) Heavy Anti-Aircraft Regiment, Royal Artillery – formed August 1941
- 131st (Mixed) Heavy Anti-Aircraft Regiment, Royal Artillery – formed August 1941, disbanded August 1943
- 132nd (Mixed) Heavy Anti-Aircraft Regiment, Royal Artillery – formed September 1941, disbanded May 1945
- 133rd (Mixed) Heavy Anti-Aircraft Regiment, Royal Artillery – formed September 1941
- 134th (Mixed) Heavy Anti-Aircraft Regiment, Royal Artillery – formed September 1941
- 135th (Mixed) Heavy Anti-Aircraft Regiment, Royal Artillery – formed October 1941
- 136th Heavy Anti-Aircraft Regiment, Royal Artillery – formed October 1941
- 137th (Mixed) Heavy Anti-Aircraft Regiment, Royal Artillery – formed November 1941
- 138th Heavy Anti-Aircraft Regiment, Royal Artillery – formed November 1941
- 139th (Mixed) Heavy Anti-Aircraft Regiment, Royal Artillery – formed December 1941
- 140th Heavy Anti-Aircraft Regiment, Royal Artillery – formed December 1941
- 141st (Mixed) Heavy Anti-Aircraft Regiment, Royal Artillery – formed December 1941
- 142nd (Mixed) Heavy Anti-Aircraft Regiment, Royal Artillery – formed December 1941
- 143rd (Mixed) Heavy Anti-Aircraft Regiment, Royal Artillery – formed January 1942
- 144th (Mixed) Heavy Anti-Aircraft Regiment, Royal Artillery – formed January 1942
- 145th (Mixed) Heavy Anti-Aircraft Regiment, Royal Artillery – formed January 1942
- 146th Heavy Anti-Aircraft Regiment, Royal Artillery – formed January 1942
- 147th Heavy Anti-Aircraft Regiment, Royal Artillery – formed February 1942, disbanded October 1943
- 148th (Mixed) Heavy Anti-Aircraft Regiment, Royal Artillery – formed February 1942, disbanded May 1945
- 149th (Mixed) Heavy Anti-Aircraft Regiment, Royal Artillery – formed February 1942
- 150th (Mixed) Heavy Anti-Aircraft Regiment, Royal Artillery – formed February 1942
- 151st (Mixed) Heavy Anti-Aircraft Regiment, Royal Artillery – formed February 1942
- 152nd (Mixed) Heavy Anti-Aircraft Regiment, Royal Artillery – formed March 1942
- 153rd (Mixed) Heavy Anti-Aircraft Regiment, Royal Artillery – formed March 1942
- 154th (Mixed) Heavy Anti-Aircraft Regiment, Royal Artillery – formed March 1942
- 155th (Mixed) Heavy Anti-Aircraft Regiment, Royal Artillery – formed March 1942
- 156th (Mixed) Heavy Anti-Aircraft Regiment, Royal Artillery – formed April 1942
- 157th (Mixed) Heavy Anti-Aircraft Regiment, Royal Artillery – formed May 1942
- 158th (Mixed) Heavy Anti-Aircraft Regiment, Royal Artillery – formed May 1942
- 159th (Mixed) Heavy Anti-Aircraft Regiment, Royal Artillery – formed May 1942, disbanded May 1945
- 160th (Mixed) Heavy Anti-Aircraft Regiment, Royal Artillery – formed June 1942
- 161st (Mixed) Heavy Anti-Aircraft Regiment, Royal Artillery – formed June 1942
- 162nd (Mixed) Heavy Anti-Aircraft Regiment, Royal Artillery – formed June 1942
- 163rd (Mixed) Heavy Anti-Aircraft Regiment, Royal Artillery – formed June 1942
- 164th Heavy Anti-Aircraft Regiment, Royal Artillery – formed July 1942, disbanded April 1945
- 165th Heavy Anti-Aircraft Regiment, Royal Artillery – formed July 1942
- 166th (Mixed) Heavy Anti-Aircraft Regiment, Royal Artillery – formed August 1942, disbanded May 1945
- 167th (Mixed) Heavy Anti-Aircraft Regiment, Royal Artillery – formed August 1942, disbanded April 1945
- 168th (Mixed) Heavy Anti-Aircraft Regiment, Royal Artillery – formed August 1942, disbanded March 1945
- 169th (Mixed) Heavy Anti-Aircraft Regiment, Royal Artillery – formed August 1942, disbanded April 1945
- 170th (Mixed) Heavy Anti-Aircraft Regiment, Royal Artillery – formed August 1942, disbanded March 1945
- 171st (Mixed) Heavy Anti-Aircraft Regiment, Royal Artillery – formed August 1942
- 172nd (Mixed) Heavy Anti-Aircraft Regiment, Royal Artillery – formed August 1942, disbanded April 1945
- 173rd (Mixed) Heavy Anti-Aircraft Regiment, Royal Artillery – formed October 1942
- 174th Heavy Anti-Aircraft Regiment, Royal Artillery – formed October 1942
- 175th Heavy Anti-Aircraft Regiment, Royal Artillery – formed October 1942
- 176th Heavy Anti-Aircraft Regiment, Royal Artillery – formed October 1942
- 177th Heavy Anti-Aircraft Regiment, Royal Artillery – renumbered from 12th HAA Regiment November 1942, disbanded June 1944
- 178th Heavy Anti-Aircraft Regiment, Royal Artillery – formed September 1942, disbanded May 1944
- 179th (Mixed) Heavy Anti-Aircraft Regiment, Royal Artillery – formed October 1942, disbanded May 1945
- 180th (Mixed) Heavy Anti-Aircraft Regiment, Royal Artillery – formed October 1942, disbanded April 1945
- 181st (Mixed Heavy Anti-Aircraft Regiment, Royal Artillery) – formed October 1942, disbanded March 1945
- 182nd (Mixed) Heavy Anti-Aircraft Regiment, Royal Artillery – formed October 1942, disbanded May 1945
- 183rd (Mixed) Heavy Anti-Aircraft Regiment, Royal Artillery – formed October 1942, disbanded June 1945
- 184th (Mixed) Heavy Anti-Aircraft Regiment, Royal Artillery – formed November 1942
- 185th (Mixed) Heavy Anti-Aircraft Regiment, Royal Artillery – formed December 1942, disbanded June 1945
- 186th (Mixed) Heavy Anti-Aircraft Regiment, Royal Artillery – formed December 1942, disbanded March 1945
- 187th (Mixed) Heavy Anti-Aircraft Regiment, Royal Artillery – formed January 1943, disbanded May 1945
- 188th (Mixed) Heavy Anti-Aircraft Regiment, Royal Artillery – formed January 1943
- 189th (Mixed) Heavy Anti-Aircraft Regiment, Royal Artillery – formed March 1943
- 190th (Mixed) Heavy Anti-Aircraft Regiment, Royal Artillery – formed January 1943, disbanded July 1944
- 191st Heavy Anti-Aircraft Regiment, Royal Artillery – formed March 1943, disbanded May 1944
- 192nd Heavy Anti-Aircraft Regiment, Royal Artillery – formed June 1943, disbanded August 1944
- 193rd Heavy Anti-Aircraft Regiment, Royal Artillery – formed July 1943, disbanded May 1944
- 194th Heavy Anti-Aircraft Regiment, Royal Artillery – formed October 1943, disbanded April 1944

(No 195th HAA Regiment formed)

- 196th Heavy Anti-Aircraft Regiment, Royal Artillery – formed December 1942, disbanded July 1944
- 197th Heavy Anti-Aircraft Regiment, Royal Artillery – formed December 1942, disbanded April 1945
- 198th Heavy Anti-Aircraft Regiment, Royal Artillery – formed January 1943, disbanded April 1944
- B Heavy Anti-Aircraft Regiment, Royal Artillery – formed August 1941, converted to 2nd HAA Regiment, West African Artillery, October 1941
- C Heavy Anti-Aircraft Regiment, Royal Artillery – formed August 1941, converted to 3rd HAA Regiment, West African Artillery, October 1941
- D Heavy Anti-Aircraft Regiment, Royal Artillery – formed August 1941, converted to 4th HAA Regiment, West African Artillery, October 1941
- E Heavy Anti-Aircraft Regiment, Royal Artillery – formed September 1941, converted to 5th HAA Regiment, West African Artillery, December 1941
- F Heavy Anti-Aircraft Regiment, Royal Artillery – formed April 1942, converted to 15th (East Africa) HAA Regiment, East African Artillery, November 1942
- X Heavy Anti-Aircraft Regiment, Royal Artillery – formed December 1940, converted to 1st HAA Regiment, West African Artillery, May 1941
- 1st Anti-Aircraft Fort Regiment, Royal Artillery – formed July 1943

=== Light Anti-Aircraft ===
Light Anti-Aircraft (LAA) units began to be formed from 1938, initially in the TA, many being converted from other roles.

- 1st Light Anti-Aircraft Regiment, Royal Artillery (Reg) – formed May 1940
- 2nd Light Anti-Aircraft Regiment, Royal Artillery (Reg) – formed October 1940, disbanded June 1944
- 3rd Light Anti-Aircraft Regiment, Royal Artillery (Reg) – formed September 1941
- 4th (Ulster) Light Anti-Aircraft Regiment, Royal Artillery (SR) – converted from 3rd (Ulster) S/L Regiment February 1942
- 11th (City of London Yeomanry) Light Anti-Aircraft Regiment, Royal Artillery (TA)
- 12th (Finsbury Rifles) Light Anti-Aircraft Regiment, Royal Artillery (TA)
- 13th Light Anti-Aircraft Regiment, Royal Artillery (TA)
- 14th (West Lothian, Royal Scots) Light Anti-Aircraft Regiment, Royal Artillery (TA)
- 15th (Isle of Man) Light Anti-Aircraft Regiment, Royal Artillery (TA)
- 16th Light Anti-Aircraft Regiment, Royal Artillery (TA) – S/A November 1944
- 17th Light Anti-Aircraft Regiment, Royal Artillery (TA)
- 18th Light Anti-Aircraft Regiment, Royal Artillery (TA)
- 19th Light Anti-Aircraft Regiment, Royal Artillery (TA)
- 20th Light Anti-Aircraft Regiment, Royal Artillery (TA)
- 21st Light Anti-Aircraft Regiment, Royal Artillery (TA) – captured March 1942
- 22nd Light Anti-Aircraft Regiment, Royal Artillery (TA)
- 23rd Light Anti-Aircraft Regiment, Royal Artillery (TA) – converted to 23rd Parachute LAA/AT Regiment February 1945
- 24th Light Anti-Aircraft Regiment, Royal Artillery (TA) – converted to 24th LAA/AT Regiment October 1942
- 25th Light Anti-Aircraft Regiment, Royal Artillery (TA)
- 26th Light Anti-Aircraft Regiment, Royal Artillery (TA)
- 27th Light Anti-Aircraft Regiment, Royal Artillery (TA)
- 28th Light Anti-Aircraft Regiment, Royal Artillery (TA)
- 29th Light Anti-Aircraft Regiment, Royal Artillery (TA)
- 30th Light Anti-Aircraft Regiment, Royal Artillery (TA)
- 31st Light Anti-Aircraft Regiment, Royal Artillery (TA)
- 32nd Light Anti-Aircraft Regiment, Royal Artillery (TA)
- 33rd Light Anti-Aircraft Regiment, Royal Artillery (TA) – converted to 33rd LAA/AT Regiment August 1943
- 34th Light Anti-Aircraft Regiment, Royal Artillery (TA) – S/A February 1945
- 35th Light Anti-Aircraft Regiment, Royal Artillery (TA) – captured February 1942
- 36th Light Anti-Aircraft Regiment, Royal Artillery (TA)
- 37th (Tyne Electrical Engineers) Light Anti-Aircraft Regiment, Royal Artillery (TA) – S/A October 1944
- 38th Light Anti-Aircraft Regiment, Royal Artillery (TA) – S/A October 1944
- 39th Light Anti-Aircraft Regiment, Royal Artillery (TA) – S/A March 1945
- 40th Light Anti-Aircraft Regiment, Royal Artillery (TA) – formed September 1939
- 41st Light Anti-Aircraft Regiment, Royal Artillery – formed November 1939, disbanded December 1944
- 42nd Light Anti-Aircraft Regiment, Royal Artillery – formed November 1939, disbanded January 1945
- 43rd Light Anti-Aircraft Regiment, Royal Artillery – formed November 1939, disbanded March 1945
- 44th Light Anti-Aircraft Regiment, Royal Artillery – formed November 1939
- 45th Light Anti-Aircraft Regiment, Royal Artillery – formed July 1940, converted to 45th Garrison Regiment February 1945
- 46th Light Anti-Aircraft Regiment, Royal Artillery – formed July 1940, disbanded August 1944
- 47th Light Anti-Aircraft Regiment, Royal Artillery – formed July 1940, converted to 615th Infantry Regiment February 1945
- 48th Light Anti-Aircraft Regiment, Royal Artillery – formed October 1940, captured March 1942
- 49th Light Anti-Aircraft Regiment, Royal Artillery – formed July 1940, disbanded January 1945
- 50th Light Anti-Aircraft Regiment, Royal Artillery – formed July 1940, disbanded March 1944
- 51st (Devon) Light Anti-Aircraft Regiment, Royal Artillery (TA)
- 52nd (East Lancashire) Light Anti-Aircraft Regiment, Royal Artillery (TA)
- 53rd (King's Own Yorkshire Light Infantry) Light Anti-Aircraft Regiment, Royal Artillery (TA)
- 54th (Argyll and Sutherland Highlanders) Light Anti-Aircraft Regiment, Royal Artillery (TA)
- 55th (Devon) Light Anti-Aircraft Regiment, Royal Artillery (TA) – converted to 55th (Devon) LAA/AT Regiment August 1943
- 56th (East Lancashire) Light Anti-Aircraft Regiment, Royal Artillery (TA) – S/A March 1945
- 57th (King's Own Yorkshire Light Infantry) Light Anti-Aircraft Regiment, Royal Artillery (TA)
- 58th (Argyll and Sutherland Highlanders) Light Anti-Aircraft Regiment, Royal Artillery (TA)
- 59th Light Anti-Aircraft Regiment, Royal Artillery – formed October 1940, disbanded December 1944
- 60th Light Anti-Aircraft Regiment, Royal Artillery – formed November 1940, disbanded December 1944
- 61st Light Anti-Aircraft Regiment, Royal Artillery – formed November 1940, disbanded August 1944
- 62nd Light Anti-Aircraft Regiment, Royal Artillery – formed October 1940, disbanded April 1944
- 63rd Light Anti-Aircraft Regiment, Royal Artillery – formed October 1940, converted to 604th Infantry Regiment February 1945
- 64th Light Anti-Aircraft Regiment, Royal Artillery – formed November 1940
- 65th Light Anti-Aircraft Regiment, Royal Artillery – formed November 1940, disbanded October 1944
- 66th Light Anti-Aircraft Regiment, Royal Artillery – formed December 1940, disbanded April 1945
- 67th Light Anti-Aircraft Regiment, Royal Artillery – formed December 1940, converted to 63rd Garrison Regiment November 1945
- 68th Light Anti-Aircraft Regiment, Royal Artillery – formed December 1940, disbanded October 1944
- 69th Light Anti-Aircraft Regiment, Royal Artillery – formed December 1940
- 70th Light Anti-Aircraft Regiment, Royal Artillery – formed January 1941, converted to 605th Infantry Regiment February 1945
- 71st Light Anti-Aircraft Regiment, Royal Artillery – formed January 1941
- 72nd Light Anti-Aircraft Regiment, Royal Artillery – formed January 1941, disbanded October 1944
- 73rd Light Anti-Aircraft Regiment, Royal Artillery – formed February 1941, disbanded May 1945
- 74th Light Anti-Aircraft Regiment, Royal Artillery – formed January 1941
- 75th (Middlesex) Light Anti-Aircraft Regiment, Royal Artillery (TA) – converted from 75th (Middlesex) S/L Regiment February 1941, S/A September 1944
- 76th Light Anti-Aircraft Regiment, Royal Artillery – formed February 1941, disbanded January 1945
- 77th Light Anti-Aircraft Regiment, Royal Artillery – formed April 1941, disbanded February 1945
- 78th Light Anti-Aircraft Regiment, Royal Artillery – formed June 1941, disbanded September 1944
- 79th Light Anti-Aircraft Regiment, Royal Artillery – formed July 1941, disbanded July 1944
- 80th Light Anti-Aircraft Regiment, Royal Artillery – formed August 1941, disbanded June 1944
- 81st Light Anti-Aircraft Regiment, Royal Artillery – formed August 1941
- 82nd Light Anti-Aircraft Regiment, Royal Artillery – formed August 1941, converted to 624th Infantry Regiment January 1945
- 83rd Light Anti-Aircraft Regiment, Royal Artillery – formed August 1941, disbanded April 1945
- 84th Light Anti-Aircraft Regiment, Royal Artillery – formed August 1941, disbanded April 1945
- 85th Light Anti-Aircraft Regiment, Royal Artillery – formed September 1941, disbanded January 1945
- 86th Light Anti-Aircraft Regiment, Royal Artillery – formed September 1941, disbanded June 1944
- 87th Light Anti-Aircraft Regiment, Royal Artillery – formed October 1941, disbanded July 1945
- 88th Light Anti-Aircraft Regiment, Royal Artillery – formed October 1941
- 89th Light Anti-Aircraft Regiment, Royal Artillery – converted from 11th Battalion, Buffs (Royal East Kent Regiment) November 1941
- 90th Light Anti-Aircraft Regiment, Royal Artillery – converted from 7th Battalion, South Wales Borderers November 1941, disbanded January 1945
- 91st Light Anti-Aircraft Regiment, Royal Artillery – converted from 12th (Pioneer) Battalion, South Staffordshire Regiment November 1941, disbanded December 1944
- 92nd (Loyals) Light Anti-Aircraft Regiment, Royal Artillery – converted from 7th Battalion, Loyal Regiment (North Lancashire) November 1941
- 93rd Light Anti-Aircraft Regiment, Royal Artillery – converted from 8th Battalion, Loyal Regiment (North Lancashire) November 1941
- 94th Light Anti-Aircraft Regiment, Royal Artillery – converted from 8th Battalion, King's Own Yorkshire Light Infantry November 1941
- 95th Light Anti-Aircraft Regiment, Royal Artillery – formed November 1941, converted to 625th Infantry Regiment January 1945
- 96th Light Anti-Aircraft Regiment, Royal Artillery – formed November 1941, disbanded May 1943
- 97th Light Anti-Aircraft Regiment, Royal Artillery – formed November 1941, converted to 626th Infantry Regiment January 1945
- 98th Light Anti-Aircraft Regiment, Royal Artillery – formed December 1941, converted to 627th Infantry Regiment January 1945
- 99th Light Anti-Aircraft Regiment, Royal Artillery – converted from 14th Battalion, Queen's Royal Regiment (West Surrey) December 1941, disbanded October 1944
- 100th Light Anti-Aircraft Regiment, Royal Artillery – converted from 18th Battalion, Royal Fusiliers December 1941, disbanded January 1945
- 101st Light Anti-Aircraft Regiment, Royal Artillery – converted from 12th Battalion, King's Regiment (Liverpool) December 1941, disbanded June 1944
- 102nd Light Anti-Aircraft Regiment, Royal Artillery – converted from 7th Battalion, Lincolnshire Regiment December 1941
- 103rd Light Anti-Aircraft Regiment, Royal Artillery – converted from 7th Battalion, East Lancashire Regiment December 1941, disbanded April 1944
- 104th Light Anti-Aircraft Regiment, Royal Artillery – converted from 13th Battalion, South Staffordshire Regiment December 1941, disbanded June 1944
- 105th Light Anti-Aircraft Regiment, Royal Artillery – converted from 8th Battalion, Dorsetshire Regiment December 1941, disbanded June 1944
- 106th (Lancashire Yeomanry) Light Anti-Aircraft Regiment, Royal Artillery (TA) – converted from 106th (Lancashire Yeomanry) Regiment, Royal Horse Artillery March 1941, S/A July 1941
- 107th Light Anti-Aircraft Regiment, Royal Artillery – converted from 14th Battalion, Royal Fusiliers January 1942, disbanded July 1944
- 108th Light Anti-Aircraft Regiment, Royal Artillery – converted from 9th Battalion, Green Howards January 1942
- 109th (Royal Sussex Regiment) Light Anti-Aircraft Regiment, Royal Artillery (TA) – converted from 7th (Cinque Ports) Battalion, Royal Sussex Regiment January 1942
- 110th Light Anti-Aircraft Regiment, Royal Artillery – converted from 7th Battalion, Dorsetshire Regiment December 1941
- 111th Light Anti-Aircraft Regiment, Royal Artillery – formed December 1941, disbanded March 1945
- 112th (Durham Light Infantry) Light Anti-Aircraft Regiment, Royal Artillery (TA) – converted from 47th (DLI) S/L Regiment January 1942
- 113th (Durham Light Infantry) Light Anti-Aircraft Regiment, Royal Artillery (TA) – converted from 55th (DLI) S/L Regiment January 1942
- 114th Light Anti-Aircraft Regiment, Royal Artillery – converted from 91st S/L Regiment January 1942, disbanded May 1945
- 115th Light Anti-Aircraft Regiment, Royal Artillery – converted from 8th Battalion, East Yorkshire Regiment January 1942, disbanded January 1945
- 116th Light Anti-Aircraft Regiment, Royal Artillery – converted from 12th Battalion, Royal Welch Fusiliers January 1942, disbanded January 1945
- 117th Light Anti-Aircraft Regiment, Royal Artillery – converted from 8th Battalion, Royal Ulster Rifles January 1942, disbanded June 1944
- 118th Light Anti-Aircraft Regiment, Royal Artillery – converted from 11th Battalion, Gloucestershire Regiment February 1942, disbanded February 1945
- 119th Light Anti-Aircraft Regiment, Royal Artillery – converted from 10th Battalion, Queen's Own Royal West Kent Regiment February 1942
- 120th Light Anti-Aircraft Regiment, Royal Artillery – converted from 86th S/L Regiment January 1942
- 121st (The Leicestershire Regiment) Light Anti-Aircraft Regiment, Royal Artillery (TA) – converted from 44th (The Leicestershire Regiment) S/L Regiment January 1942
- 122nd (Royal Warwickshire Regiment) Light Anti-Aircraft Regiment, Royal Artillery (TA) – converted from 45th (Royal Warwickshire Regiment) S/L Regiment February 1942, converted to 122nd (Royal Warwickshire Regiment) LAA/AT Regiment January 1944
- 123rd (City of London Rifles) Light Anti-Aircraft Regiment, Royal Artillery (TA) – converted from 44th (31st (City of London Rifles) S/L Regiment February 1942
- 124th (Highland) Light Anti-Aircraft Regiment, Royal Artillery (TA) – converted from 51st (Highland) S/L Regiment February 1942
- 125th (Cameronians) Light Anti-Aircraft Regiment, Royal Artillery (TA) – converted from 56th (Cameronians) S/L Regiment February 1942
- 126th (Middlesex) Light Anti-Aircraft Regiment, Royal Artillery (TA) – converted from 60th (Middlesex) S/L Regiment February 1942
- 127th (Queen's) Light Anti-Aircraft Regiment, Royal Artillery (TA) – converted from 63rd (Queen's) S/L Regiment February 1942
- 128th Light Anti-Aircraft Regiment, Royal Artillery – converted from 87th S/L Regiment March 1942, converted to 628th Infantry Regiment January 1945
- 129th (First Surrey Rifles) Light Anti-Aircraft Regiment, Royal Artillery (TA) – converted from 35th (First Surrey Rifles) S/L Regiment March 1942
- 130th (Queen's Edinburgh, Royal Scots) Light Anti-Aircraft Regiment, Royal Artillery (TA) – converted from 52nd (Queen's Edinburgh, Royal Scots) S/L Regiment March 1942
- 131st Light Anti-Aircraft Regiment, Royal Artillery – converted from 81st S/L Regiment March 1942
- 132nd Light Anti-Aircraft Regiment, Royal Artillery – converted from 85th S/L Regiment March 1942, disbanded March 1945
- 133rd Light Anti-Aircraft Regiment, Royal Artillery – converted from 89th S/L Regiment March 1942
- 134th Light Anti-Aircraft Regiment, Royal Artillery, formed February 1942, disbanded June 1945
- 135th Light Anti-Aircraft Regiment, Royal Artillery, formed February 1942, converted to 629th Infantry Regiment February 1945
- 136th Light Anti-Aircraft Regiment, Royal Artillery, formed February 1942, disbanded April 1945
- 137th Light Anti-Aircraft Regiment, Royal Artillery, formed March 1942, disbanded March 1945
- 138th Light Anti-Aircraft Regiment, Royal Artillery, formed May 1942
- 139th Light Anti-Aircraft Regiment, Royal Artillery, formed July 1942, disbanded May 1945
- 140th Light Anti-Aircraft Regiment, Royal Artillery, formed July 1942, disbanded November 1944
- 141st Light Anti-Aircraft Regiment, Royal Artillery, formed July 1942, disbanded March 1944
- 142nd Light Anti-Aircraft Regiment, Royal Artillery, formed October 1942
- 143rd Light Anti-Aircraft Regiment, Royal Artillery, formed October 1942
- 144th Light Anti-Aircraft Regiment, Royal Artillery, formed October 1942
- 145th Light Anti-Aircraft Regiment, Royal Artillery, formed October 1942, disbanded February 1945
- 146th Light Anti-Aircraft Regiment, Royal Artillery (TA) – converted from 77th S/L Regiment March 1943, disbanded June 1944
- 147th (Glasgow) Light Anti-Aircraft Regiment, Royal Artillery (TA) – converted from 57th (Glasgow) S/L Regiment March 1943
- 148th (Warwickshire) Light Anti-Aircraft Regiment, Royal Artillery (TA) – converted from 59th (Warwickshire) S/L Regiment April 1943, S/A May 1945
- 149th (Sherwood Foresters) Light Anti-Aircraft Regiment, Royal Artillery (TA) – converted from 40th (Sherwood Foresters) S/L Regiment June 1943
- 150th (The Loyals) Light Anti-Aircraft Regiment, Royal Artillery (TA) – converted from 62nd (Loyals) S/L Regiment April 1943
- 151st Light Anti-Aircraft Regiment, Royal Artillery – converted from 114th (Composite) HAA Regiment May 1943, disbanded March 1945
- 152nd Light Anti-Aircraft Regiment, Royal Artillery, formed August 1944, redesignated 'A' LAA Regiment September 1944, disbanded November 1944

=== Light Anti-Aircraft/Anti-tank ===
Light Anti-Aircraft/Anti-Tank regiments were usually created by merging batteries from two separate units under a single regimental headquarters; some of these were shortlived.

- 23rd Parachute Light Anti-Aircraft/Anti-Tank Regiment, Royal Artillery (TA) – converted from 23rd LAA Regiment February 1945
- 24th Light Anti-Aircraft/Anti-Tank Regiment, Royal Artillery (TA) – converted from 24th LAA Regiment November 1942; converted to 24th A/T Regiment September 1944
- 33rd Light Anti-Aircraft/Anti-Tank Regiment, Royal Artillery (TA) – converted from 33rd LAA Regiment August 1943; converted to 33rd A/T Regiment September 1944
- 55th (Devon) Light Anti-Aircraft/Anti-Tank Regiment, Royal Artillery (TA) – converted from 55th (Devon) LAA Regiment August 1943; converted to 111st (Devon) A/T Regiment September 1944
- 56th (King's Own) Light Anti-Aircraft/Anti-Tank Regiment, Royal Artillery (TA) – converted from 56th (Kings Own) A/T Regiment August 1943; reverted September 1944
- 69th (Duke of Connaught's Hampshire) Light Anti-Aircraft/Anti-Tank Regiment, Royal Artillery (TA) – converted from 69th (Duke of Connaught's Hampshire) A/T Regiment August 1943; converted into 69 Chindit Column September 1943
- 82nd Light Anti-Aircraft/Anti-Tank Regiment, Royal Artillery – converted from 82nd A/T Regiment November 1942; reverted September 1944
- 100th (Gordon Highlanders) Light Anti-Aircraft/Anti-Tank Regiment, Royal Artillery (TA) – converted from 100th (Gordon Highlanders) A/T Regiment January 1944; reverted September 1944
- 101st Light Anti-Aircraft/Anti-Tank Regiment, Royal Artillery (TA) – converted from 60th (Royal Welch Fusiliers) A/T Regiment January 1940; converted to 76th (Royal Welch Fusiliers) A/T Regiment November 1940
- 102nd (Northumberland Hussars) Light Anti-Aircraft/Anti-Tank Regiment, Royal Artillery (TA) – converted from Northumberland Hussars, Royal Armoured Corps, February 1940; converted to 102nd (Northumberland Hussars) A/T Regiment March 1941
- 122nd (Royal Warwickshire Regiment) Light Anti-Aircraft/Anti-Tank Regiment, Royal Artillery (TA) – converted from 122nd (Royal Warwickshire Regiment) A/T Regiment January 1944; reverted September 1944

=== Searchlight ===
The following anti-aircraft searchlight (S/L) regiments served with the Royal Artillery during the period. Many of these units were transferred in August 1940 from the Royal Engineers (RE), in which they had been designated 'Anti-Aircraft Battalions'; most of these were converted infantry battalions, while other converted infantry battalions transferred directly to the RA.

- 1st Searchlight Regiment (Reg) – from RE
- 2nd Searchlight Regiment (Reg) – from RE
- 3rd (Ulster) Searchlight Regiment, Royal Artillery (SR) – converted to 4th (Ulster) LAA Regiment January 1942
- 4th Searchlight Regiment, Royal Artillery/Royal Malta Artillery – formed November 1940, disbanded May 1944
- 5th Searchlight Regiment, Royal Artillery – formed May 1941, captured February 1942
- 26th (Mixed) Searchlight Regiment (London Electrical Engineers), Royal Artillery (TA) – from RE
- 27th (London Electrical Engineers) Searchlight Regiment, Royal Artillery (TA) – from RE
- 28th (Essex) Searchlight Regiment, Royal Artillery (TA) – from RE, converted to 630th Infantry Regiment January 1945
- 29th (Kent) Searchlight Regiment, Royal Artillery (TA) – from RE, converted to 631st Infantry Regiment January 1945
- 30th (Surrey) Searchlight Regiment, Royal Artillery (TA) – from RE, S/A December 1943
- 31st (City of London Rifles) Searchlight Regiment, Royal Artillery (TA) – from RE, converted to 123rd LAA Regiment February 1942
- 32nd (7th City of London) Searchlight Regiment, Royal Artillery (TA) – from RE, S/A May 1945
- 33rd (St Pancras) Searchlight Regiment, Royal Artillery (TA) – from RE, converted to 632nd Infantry Regiment January 1945
- 34th (Queen's Own Royal West Kent) Searchlight Regiment, Royal Artillery (TA) – from RE, converted to 633rd Infantry Regiment January 1945
- 35th (First Surrey Rifles) Searchlight Regiment, Royal Artillery (TA) – from RE converted to 129th LAA Regiment March 1942
- 36th (Middlesex) Searchlight Regiment, Royal Artillery (TA) – from RE – converted to 634th Infantry Regiment January 1945
- 37th (Tyne Electrical Engineers) Searchlight Regiment, Royal Artillery (TA) – from RE
- 38th (The King's Regiment) Searchlight Regiment, Royal Artillery (TA) – from RE, converted to 635th Infantry Regiment January 1945
- 39th (The Lancashire Fusiliers) Searchlight Regiment, Royal Artillery (TA) – from RE, reduced to cadre May 1943
- 40th (The Sherwood Foresters) Searchlight Regiment, Royal Artillery (TA) – from RE, converted to 149th LAA Regiment June 1943
- 41st (5th North Staffordshire Regiment) Searchlight Regiment, Royal Artillery (TA) – from RE
- 42nd (Robin Hoods, Sherwood Foresters) Searchlight Regiment, Royal Artillery (TA) – from RE
- 43rd (5th Duke of Wellington's Regiment) Searchlight Regiment, Royal Artillery (TA) – from RE, converted to 43rd Garrison Regiment October 1944
- 44th (The Leicestershire Regiment) Searchlight Regiment, Royal Artillery (TA) – from RE, converted to 121st LAA Regiment January 1942
- 45th (Royal Warwickshire Regiment) Searchlight Regiment, Royal Artillery (TA) – from RE, converted to 122nd LAA Regiment February 1942
- 46th (The Lincolnshire Regiment) Searchlight Regiment, Royal Artillery (TA) – from RE, converted to 46th Garrison Regiment November 1944
- 47th (Durham Light Infantry) Searchlight Regiment, Royal Artillery (TA) – from RE, converted to 112th LAA Regiment January 1942
- 48th (Hampshire) Searchlight Regiment, Royal Artillery (TA) – from RE, converted to 636th Infantry Regiment January 1945
- 49th (The West Yorkshire Regiment) Searchlight Regiment, Royal Artillery (TA) – from RE, converted to 49th Garrison Regiment October 1944
- 50th (The Northamptonshire Regiment) Searchlight Regiment, Royal Artillery (TA) – from RE, converted to 637th Infantry Regiment January 1945
- 51st (Highland) Searchlight Regiment, Royal Artillery (TA) – from RE, converted to 124th LAA Regiment in February 1942
- 52nd (Queen's Edinburgh, Royal Scots) Searchlight Regiment, Royal Artillery (TA) – from infantry, converted to 130th LAA Regiment March 1942
- 53rd (Royal Northumberland Fusiliers) Searchlight Regiment, Royal Artillery (TA) – from infantry, converted to 638th Infantry Regiment January 1945
- 54th (Durham Light Infantry) Searchlight Regiment, Royal Artillery (TA) – from infantry
- 55th (Durham Light Infantry) Searchlight Regiment, Royal Artillery (TA) – from infantry, converted to 113th LAA Regiment January 1942
- 56th (5th Battalion, Cameronian Scottish Rifles) Searchlight Regiment, Royal Artillery (TA) – from infantry, converted to 125th LAA Regiment February 1942
- 57th (8th Battalion, Cameronian Scottish Rifles) Searchlight Regiment, Royal Artillery (TA) – from infantry, converted to 147th LAA Regiment March 1943
- 58th (Middlesex) Searchlight Regiment, Royal Artillery (TA) – from RE, converted to 58th Garrison Regiment November 1944
- 59th (Warwickshire) Searchlight Regiment, Royal Artillery (TA) – from infantry, converted to 148th LAA Regiment April 1943
- 60th (Middlesex) Searchlight Regiment, Royal Artillery (TA) – from infantry, converted to 126th LAA Regiment February 1942
- 61st (South Lancashire Regiment) Searchlight Regiment, Royal Artillery (TA) – from infantry – converted to 61st Garrison Regiment February 1942
- 62nd (Loyals) Searchlight Regiment, Royal Artillery (TA) – from infantry, converted to 150 LAA Regiment May 1943
- 63rd (Queen's) Searchlight Regiment, Royal Artillery (TA) – from infantry – converted to 127th LAA Regiment February 1942
- 64th (Essex Regiment) Searchlight Regiment, Royal Artillery (TA) – from infantry, converted to 639th Infantry Regiment January 1945
- 65th (Essex Regiment) Searchlight Regiment, Royal Artillery (TA) – from infantry, converted to 65th Garrison Regiment November 1944
- 66th (Gloucesters) Searchlight Regiment, Royal Artillery (TA) – from infantry, S/A May 1945
- 67th (Welch) Searchlight Regiment, Royal Artillery (TA) – from infantry, converted to 67th Garrison Regiment November 1944
- 68th (Monmouthshire Regiment) Searchlight Regiment, Royal Artillery (TA) – from infantry, converted to 68th Garrison Regiment November 1944
- 69th (3rd City of London) Searchlight Regiment, Royal Artillery (TA) – from infantry
- 70th (Sussex) Searchlight Regiment, Royal Artillery (TA) – S/A September 1944
- 71st (East Lancashire) Searchlight Regiment, Royal Artillery (TA) – reduced to cadre 1943
- 72nd (Middlesex) Searchlight Regiment, Royal Artillery (TA) – S/A September 1944
- 73rd (Kent Fortress) Searchlight Regiment, Royal Artillery (TA) – from RE, S/A September 1944
- 74th (Essex Fortress) Searchlight Regiment, Royal Artillery (TA) – from RE, converted to 74th Garrison Regiment November 1944
- 75th (Middlesex) Searchlight Regiment, Royal Artillery (TA) – converted to 75th LAA Regiment February 1941
- 76th Searchlight Regiment, Royal Artillery – formed July 1940, disbanded September 1944
- 77th Searchlight Regiment, Royal Artillery – formed August 1940, converted to 146th LAA Regiment March 1943
- 78th Searchlight Regiment, Royal Artillery – formed August 1940, disbanded September 1943
- 79th Searchlight Regiment, Royal Artillery – formed October 1940, disbanded December 1944
- 80th Searchlight Regiment, Royal Artillery – formed October 1940, disbanded December 1944
- 81st Searchlight Regiment, Royal Artillery – formed November 1940, partly from an RE company; converted to 131st LAA Regiment March 1942
- 82nd Searchlight Regiment – formed November 1940, disbanded September 1944
- 83rd Searchlight Regiment, Royal Artillery – formed January 1941, disbanded December 1944
- 84th Searchlight Regiment, Royal Artillery – formed December 1940, disbanded October 1943
- 85th Searchlight Regiment, Royal Artillery – formed January 1941, converted to 132nd LAA Regiment March 1942
- 86th Searchlight Regiment, Royal Artillery – formed January 1941, converted to 120 LAA Regiment January 1942
- 87th Searchlight Regiment, Royal Artillery – formed January 1941, converted to 128th LAA Regiment March 1942
- 88th Searchlight Regiment, Royal Artillery – formed March 1941, disbanded March 1943
- 89th Searchlight Regiment, Royal Artillery – formed March 1941, converted to 133rd LAA Regiment March 1942
- 90th Searchlight Regiment, Royal Artillery – formed March 1941, disbanded September 1943
- 91st Searchlight Regiment, Royal Artillery – formed March 1941, converted to 114th LAA Regiment January 1942
- 92nd Searchlight Regiment, Royal Artillery – formed May 1941, disbanded May 1943
- 93rd (Mixed) Searchlight Regiment – formed October 1942, disbanded July 1945

=== Anti-Aircraft 'Z' Rocket ===
Anti-Aircraft Z Regiments were armed with rockets fired from a simple launcher. Later in the war they could include some ATS personnel and many batteries were manned by the Home Guard with regular army command post staff. Some independent batteries served abroad. All Anti-Aircraft Z Regiments were redesignated Anti-Aircraft Area Mixed Regiments in April 1944 and all were disbanded by April 1945.

- 1st Anti-Aircraft Z Regiment RA - Formed January 1941, disbanded May 1945
- 2nd Anti-Aircraft Z Regiment RA - Formed September 1940, disbanded April 1945
- 3rd Anti-Aircraft Z Regiment RA - Formed September 1940, disbanded April 1945
- 4th Anti-Aircraft Z Regiment RA - Formed September 1940, disbanded March 1945
- 5th Anti-Aircraft Z Regiment RA - Formed September 1940, batteries disbanded January 1945
- 6th Anti-Aircraft Z Regiment RA - Formed September 1940, disbanded March 1945
- 7th Anti-Aircraft Z Regiment RA - Formed September 1940, disbanded April 1945
- 8th Anti-Aircraft Z Regiment RA - Formed September 1940, batteries disbanded March 1945
- 9th Anti-Aircraft Z Regiment RA - Formed January 1941, disbanded April 1945
- 10th Anti-Aircraft Z Regiment RA - Formed January 1941, disbanded April 1945
- 11th Anti-Aircraft Z Regiment RA - Formed January 1941, batteries disbanded March 1945
- 12th Anti-Aircraft Z Regiment RA - Formed March 1941, disbanded October 1943. Batteries became independent
- 13th Anti-Aircraft Z Regiment RA - Formed August 1941, disbanded March 1945
- 14th Anti-Aircraft Z Regiment RA - Formed September 1941, disbanded April 1945
- 15th Anti-Aircraft Z Regiment RA - Formed September 1941, disbanded April 1945
- 16th Anti-Aircraft Z Regiment RA - Formed October 1942, disbanded March 1945
- 17th Anti-Aircraft Z Regiment RA - Formed October 1942, disbanded March 1945
- 18th Anti-Aircraft Z Regiment RA - Formed October 1942, disbanded April 1945
- 19th Anti-Aircraft Z Regiment RA - Formed October 1942, batteries disbanded March 1945
- 20th Anti-Aircraft Z Regiment RA - Formed October 1942, disbanded March 1945
- 21st Anti-Aircraft Z Regiment RA - Formed December 1942, disbanded March 1945
- 22nd Anti-Aircraft Area Mixed Regiment RA - Formed April 1944, batteries disbanded April 1945
- 23rd Anti-Aircraft Area Mixed Regiment RA - Formed April 1944, batteries disbanded March 1945
- 24th Anti-Aircraft Area Mixed Regiment RA - Formed April 1944, disbanded April 1945
- 25th Anti-Aircraft Area Mixed Regiment RA - Formed April 1944, disbanded March 1945

== Maritime ==
The Maritime Anti-Aircraft Regiment Royal Artillery initially had 3 Light Machine Gun Regiments each with two batteries and one regiment of a battery of Bofors 40 mm. Port detachments were formed to find pools of trained Light Machine Gun gunners who could be embarked as required. Eventually the machine guns were mostly replaced by 20 mm Oerlikons and 40 mm Bofors. There was no higher formation, each commanding officer reporting direct to RA6 at the War Office. In September 1942 a gunner Brigadier was appointed as commander and in January 1943 the regiment was re-titled Maritime Royal Artillery. In March 1943 numbers were increased and the regiment organised into six regiments and twenty-four port detachments in Britain. There were four overseas batteries at New York, Port Said, Bombay and South Africa and four independent troops at Freetown, Sydney, Algiers and Haifa. A fifth troop was added later at Naples. In August 1945 the regiment was re-organised into 1st, 4th and 5th Regiments each with an RHQ, Training Battery and Holding Battery. There was also 2nd Regiment in India but this was not fully formed.

== Infantry and Garrison Regiments ==
=== Garrison Regiments ===
Towards the end of 1944 Britain's field armies were suffering a manpower crisis, so the Royal Artillery began converting surplus air and coast defence regiments into Garrison regiments for service in rear areas.

- 43rd (5th Duke of Wellington's Regiment) Garrison Regiment, Royal Artillery – converted from 43rd Searchlight Regiment October 1944, reorganised as 600th Infantry Regiment November 1944
- 45th Garrison Regiment, Royal Artillery – converted from 45th LAA Regiment November 1944, reorganised as 603rd Infantry Regiment February 1945
- 46th (Lincolnshire Regiment) Garrison Regiment, Royal Artillery – converted from 46th Searchlight Regiment November 1944, reorganised as 606th Infantry Regiment February 1945
- 47th Garrison Regiment, Royal Artillery – converted from 47th LAA Regiment December 1944, reorganised as 615th Infantry Regiment February 1945
- 49th (The West Yorkshire Regiment) Garrison Regiment, Royal Artillery – converted from 49th Searchlight Regiment October 1944, reorganised as 601st Infantry Regiment
- 58th (Middlesex) Garrison Regiment, Royal Artillery – converted from 58th Searchlight Regiment November 1944, reorganised as 611th Infantry Regiment February 1945
- 61st (South Lancashire Regiment) Garrison Regiment, Royal Artillery – converted from 61st Searchlight Regiment November 1944, reorganised as 612th Infantry Regiment February 1945
- 63rd Garrison Regiment, Royal Artillery – converted from 63rd LAA Regiment November 1944, reorganised as 604th Infantry Regiment February 1945
- 65th (Essex Regiment) Garrison Regiment, Royal Artillery – converted from 65th Searchlight Regiment November 1944, reorganised as 607th Infantry Regiment February 1945
- 67th (Welch Regiment) Garrison Regiment, Royal Artillery – converted from 67th Searchlight Regiment November 1944, reorganised as 608th Infantry Regiment February 1945
- 68th (Monmouthshire Regiment) Garrison Regiment, Royal Artillery – converted from 68th Searchlight Regiment November 1944, reorganised as 609th Infantry Regiment February 1945
- 70th Garrison Regiment, Royal Artillery – converted from 70th LAA Regiment November 1944, reorganised as 605th Infantry Regiment February 1945
- 74th (Essex Fortress) Garrison Regiment, Royal Artillery – converted from 74th Searchlight Regiment November 1944, reorganised as 613th Infantry Regiment February 1945
- 97th (London Scottish) Garrison Regiment, Royal Artillery – converted from 97th HAA Regiment November 1944, reorganised as 610th Infantry Regiment February 1945
- 200th Garrison Rgt – formed as 'X' British Garrison Regiment, RA, October 1944, redesignated November 1944, reorganised as 602nd Infantry Regiment February 1945
- 516th (Thames and Medway) Garrison Regiment, Royal Artillery – converted from 516th Coast Regiment December 1944, reorganised as 614th Infantry Regiment January 1945

=== Infantry Regiments, RA ===
By the beginning of 1945 the manpower crisis had deepened, and the garrison regiments were converted into infantry regiments for service on the lines of communication and occupation duties, together with other surplus regiments. Although formally these units were entitled 'Regiments, RA', the word 'Infantry' is often added (then and subsequently) for clarity.

- 51st/69th Infantry Regiment, Royal Artillery – formed by amalgamation of 51st (Westmorland and Cumberland) Field Regiment, Royal Artillery with 69th (Duke of Connaught's Hampshire) Light Anti-Aircraft/Anti-Tank Regiment, Royal Artillery, operated as 51 and 69 Chindit Columns from October 1943, S/A October 1944
- 60th (North Midland) Infantry Regiment – converted from 60th (North Midland) Field Regiment, Royal Artillery October 1943, operated as 60 and 88 Chindit Columns; S/A October 1944
- 78th (Auxiliary Police) Regiment, Royal Artillery (Duke of Lancaster's Own Yeomanry) – converted from 78th (Duke of Lancaster's Own Yeomanry) Medium Regiment October 1945
- 600th (5th Bn Duke of Wellington's Regiment) Infantry Regiment, Royal Artillery – converted from 43rd Garrison Regiment November 1944, S/A February 1945
- 601st (The West Yorkshire Regiment) Infantry Regiment, Royal Artillery – converted from 49th Garrison Regiment
- 602nd Infantry Regiment, Royal Artillery – converted from 200th Garrison Regiment February 1945
- 603rd Infantry Regiment, Royal Artillery – converted from 45th Garrison Regiment February 1945
- 604th Infantry Regiment, Royal Artillery – converted from 63rd Garrison Regiment February 1945
- 605th Infantry Regiment, Royal Artillery – converted from 70th Garrison Regiment February 1945
- 606th (Lincolnshire Regiment) Infantry Regiment, Royal Artillery – converted from 46th Garrison Regiment February 1945
- 607th (Essex Regiment) Infantry Regiment, Royal Artillery – converted from 65th Garrison Regiment February 1945
- 608th (Welch) Infantry Regiment, Royal Artillery – converted from 67th Garrison Regiment February 1945
- 609th (Monmouthshire Regiment) Infantry Regiment, Royal Artillery – converted from 68th Garrison Regiment February 1945
- 610th (London Scottish) Infantry Regiment, Royal Artillery – converted from 97th Garrison Regiment February 1945
- 611th (Middlesex) Infantry Regiment, Royal Artillery – converted from 58th Garrison Regiment February 1945
- 612th (South Lancashire Regiment) Infantry Regiment, Royal Artillery – converted from 61st Garrison Regiment February 1945
- 613th (Essex Fortress) Infantry Regiment, Royal Artillery – converted from 74th Garrison Regiment February 1945
- 614th (Thames and Medway) Infantry Regiment, Royal Artillery – converted from 516th Garrison Regiment January 1945
- 615th Infantry Regiment, Royal Artillery – converted from 47th Garrison Regiment February 1945
- 616th (Tynemouth) Infantry Regiment, Royal Artillery – converted from 508th Coast Regiment January 1945
- 617th (East Riding) Infantry Regiment, Royal Artillery – converted from 512th Coast Regiment January 1945
- 618th (Dorsetshire) Infantry Regiment, Royal Artillery – converted from 522nd Coast Regiment January 1945
- 619th (Lancashire and Cheshire) Infantry Regiment, Royal Artillery – converted from 524th Coast Regiment January 1945
- 620th (Pembroke) Infantry Regiment, Royal Artillery – converted from 532nd Coast Regiment January 1945
- 621st Infantry Regiment, Royal Artillery – was to have been converted from 64th LAA Regiment but never actually formed
- 622nd Infantry Regiment, Royal Artillery – converted from 117th HAA Regiment January 1945
- 623rd Infantry Regiment, Royal Artillery – converted from 67th LAA Regiment January 1945
- 624th Infantry Regiment, Royal Artillery – converted from 82nd LAA Regiment January 1945
- 625th Infantry Regiment, Royal Artillery – converted from 95th LAA Regiment January 1945
- 626th Infantry Regiment, Royal Artillery – converted from 97th LAA Regiment January 1945
- 627th Infantry Regiment, Royal Artillery – converted from 98th LAA Regiment January 1945
- 628th Infantry Regiment, Royal Artillery – converted from 128th LAA Regiment January 1945
- 629th Infantry Regiment, Royal Artillery – converted from 135th LAA Regiment January 1945
- 630th (Essex) Infantry Regiment, Royal Artillery – converted from 28th Searchlight Regiment January 1945
- 631st (Kent) Infantry Regiment, Royal Artillery – converted from 29th Searchlight Regiment January 1945
- 632nd (St Pancras) Infantry Regiment, Royal Artillery – converted from 33rd Searchlight Regiment January 1945
- 633rd (Queen's Own Royal West Kent) Infantry Regiment, Royal Artillery – converted from 34th Searchlight Regiment January 1945
- 634th (Middlesex) Infantry Regiment, Royal Artillery – converted from 36th Searchlight Regiment January 1945
- 635th (King's Regiment) Infantry Regiment, Royal Artillery – converted from 38th Searchlight Regiment January 1945
- 636th (Hampshire) Infantry Regiment, Royal Artillery – converted from 48th Searchlight Regiment January 1945
- 637th (The Northamptonshire Regiment) Infantry Regiment, Royal Artillery – converted from 50th Searchlight Regiment January 1945
- 638th (Royal Northumberland Fusiliers) Infantry Regiment, Royal Artillery – converted from 53rd Searchlight Regiment January 1945
- 639th (Essex Regiment) Infantry Regiment, Royal Artillery – converted from 64th Searchlight Regiment January 1945

== Training ==
Training regiments changed designation frequently as new roles and requirements appeared.

- 1st (Mixed) Royal Artillery Training Regiment (Radar) – converted from 236th Mixed Anti-Aircraft (Operators Fire Control) Training Regiment February 1944; disbanded September 1945
- 2nd Field Training Regiment, Royal Artillery – formed September 1939; disbanded February 1941
- 2nd Royal Artillery Training Regiment (Light Anti-Aircraft) – formed September 1940; disbanded October 1944
- 2nd Mountain Training Regiment, Royal Artillery – formed April 1945; disbanded December 1945
- 2nd Coast Trining Regiment, Royal Artillery – redesignated from 70th Coast Training Regiment July 1945
- 3rd Field Training Regiment, Royal Artillery – formed by July 1942; disbanded July 1943
- 4th Field Training Regiment, Royal Artillery – formed by July 1942; disbanded April 1947
- 5th Field Training Regiment, Royal Artillery – formed by July 1942; disbanded September 1943
- 6th Field Training Regiment, Royal Artillery – formed by July 1942; disbanded March 1944
- 7th Heavy Anti-Aircraft Training Regiment, Royal Artillery – formed by November 1940; Mixed in May 1941; converted to infantry training regiment February 1945; disbanded December 1945
- 9th Field Training Regiment, Royal Artillery – formed by July 1942; disbanded November 1943
- 10th Light Anti-Aircraft Training Regiment, Royal Artillery – formed by November 1940; converted to Field October 1944; converted to Specialist September 1945
- 11th Anti-Aircraft Driver Training Regiment, Royal Artillery – formed by November 1940; disbanded November 1943
- 12th Field Training Regiment, Royal Artillery – formed by July 1941; disbanded May 1943
- 16th Field Training Regiment, Royal Artillery – formed by July 1942; disbanded October 1942
- 21st Medium and Heavy Training Regiment, Royal Artillery – formed by July 1942; disbanded October 1942
- 21st Royal Artillery Training Regiment – formed September 1944
- 22nd Medium and Heavy Training Regiment, Royal Artillery – formed by July 1941; converted to Field August 1941; converted to Anti-Tank February 1942; disbanded November 1945
- 23rd Medium and Heavy Training Regiment, Royal Artillery – formed by July 1941; converted to Field August 1941; reverted to Medium and Heavy May 1945; disbanded October 1946
- 24th Heavy Anti-Aircraft Training Regiment, Royal Artillery – formed by November 1940; became Mixed March 1942; converted to mobile LAA May 1943
- 25th Medium and Heavy Training Regiment, Royal Artillery – formed by August 1942; disbanded March 1944
- 34th Signal Training Regiment, Royal Artillery – formed by July 1941; disbanded November 1945
- 35th Signal Training Regiment, Royal Artillery – formed by July 1941; disbanded January 1946
- 36th Signal Training Regiment, Royal Artillery – formed by July 1941; disbanded August 1941
- 37th Signal Training Regiment, Royal Artillery – formed by July 1941; disbanded December 1943
- 38th Signal Training Regiment, Royal Artillery – formed by July 1941; disbanded July 1944
- 39th Signal Training Regiment, Royal Artillery – formed by July 1941; disbanded January 1947
- 41st Survey Training Regiment, Royal Artillery – formed by July 1941; disbanded August 1941
- 50th Anti-Tank Training Regiment, Royal Artillery – formed by July 1941; disbanded July 1943
- 51st Anti-Tank Training Regiment, Royal Artillery – formed by July 1942; converted to Self-Propelled March 1944
- 52nd Anti-Aircraft Driver Training Regiment, Royal Artillery – formed by November 1940; converted to AA Signals December 1942; reverted to AA Driver March 1944; disbanded December 1945
- 53rd Anti-Aircraft Driver Training Regiment, Royal Artillery – formed by November 1940; disbanded August 1942
- 69th Coast Training Regiment, Royal Artillery – formed November 1940; disbanded December 1945
- 70th Coast Training Regiment, Royal Artillery – converted from 2nd Heavy Regiment November 1940; redesignated 2nd Coast Training Regiment July 1945
- 71st Coast Training Regiment, Royal Artillery – formed November 1940; disbanded April 1945
- 72nd Coast Training Regiment, Royal Artillery – formed November 1940; disbanded January 1942
- 73rd Coast Training Regiment, Royal Artillery – formed March 1941; disbanded January 1942
- 88th Training Regiment, Royal Artillery – converted from 88th (Manchester Regiment) Anti-Tank Regiment, Royal Artillery, June 1945; disbanded May 1946
- 205th Heavy Anti-Aircraft Training Regiment, Royal Artillery – formed by November 1940; became Mixed July 1941; converted to infantry training April 1945
- 206th Heavy Anti-Aircraft Training Regiment, Royal Artillery – formed by November 1940; became Mixed July 1941; converted to Mobile LAA May 1943; disbanded October 1945
- 207th Heavy Anti-Aircraft Training Regiment, Royal Artillery – redesignated from 7th AA Militia Depot September 1939; became Mixed December 1941; disbanded October 1942
- 208th Light Anti-Aircraft Training Regiment, Royal Artillery – formed by November 1940; disbanded September 1942
- 209th Heavy Anti-Aircraft Training Regiment, Royal Artillery – formed by November 1940; became Mixed August 1941; disbanded September 1942
- 210th Heavy Anti-Aircraft Training Regiment, Royal Artillery – formed by November 1940; became Mixed July 1941; disbanded November 1943
- 211th Heavy Anti-Aircraft Training Regiment, Royal Artillery – formed by November 1940; became Mixed June 1941; converted to infantry training April 1945
- 212th Light Anti-Aircraft Training Regiment, Royal Artillery – formed by November 1940; converted to Mobile LAA May 1943; disbanded October 1944
- 213th Light Anti-Aircraft Training Regiment, Royal Artillery – formed by November 1940; disbanded June 1942
- 216th Searchlight Training Regiment, Royal Artillery – formed by November 1940; became Mixed April 1942
- 217th Searchlight Training Regiment, Royal Artillery – formed by November 1940; converted to AA (ATS) Driver Training May 1941
- 220th Searchlight Training Regiment, Royal Artillery – formed by November 1940; converted to LAA May 1941; disbanded October 1944
- 222nd Searchlight Training Regiment, Royal Artillery – formed by November 1940; became Mixed April 1942; disbanded October 1944
- 223rd Heavy Anti-Aircraft Training Regiment, Royal Artillery – formed by November 1940; disbanded June 1943
- 224th Light Anti-Aircraft Training Regiment, Royal Artillery – formed by November 1940; disbanded June 1942
- 225th Light Anti-Aircraft Training Regiment, Royal Artillery – formed by November 1940; disbanded September 1942
- 226th Light Anti-Aircraft Training Regiment, Royal Artillery – formed by November 1940; disbanded March 1942
- 227th Anti-Aircraft Driver and Driver/OperatorTraining Regiment, Royal Artillery – formed by November 1940; dropped Driver/Operator December 1942
- 228th Anti-Aircraft Driver and Driver/OperatorTraining Regiment, Royal Artillery – formed by November 1940; converted to AA Signals December 1942; disbanded September 1943
- 229th Anti-Aircraft Driver and Driver/OperatorTraining Regiment, Royal Artillery – formed by November 1940; dropped Driver/Operator December 1942; disbanded November 1943
- 230th Searchlight Training Regiment, Royal Artillery – formed by November 1940; disbanded April 1942
- 231st Searchlight Training Regiment, Royal Artillery – formed by November 1940; disbanded June 1942
- 232nd Searchlight Training Regiment, Royal Artillery – formed by November 1940; converted to ATS Operators Fire Control July 1941; disbanded February 1944
- 233rd Searchlight Training Regiment, Royal Artillery – formed by November 1940; converted to LAA May 1941; converted to No 1 Primary Training Centre July 1942
- 234th Searchlight Training Regiment, Royal Artillery – formed by November 1940; concerted to LAA May 1941; disbanded May 1942
- 235th Searchlight Training Regiment, Royal Artillery – formed by November 1940; disbanded January 1942
- 236th Searchlight Training Regiment, Royal Artillery – formed by November 1940; became 236th Mixed AA (Operators Fire Control) Training Regiment July 1943; redesignated 1st (Mixed) RA Training Regiment (Radar) January 1944
- 237th Searchlight Training Regiment, Royal Artillery – formed by November 1940; converted to LAA November 1941; disbanded May 1942
- 238th Searchlight Training Regiment, Royal Artillery – formed by November 1940; converted to 'Z' July 1941; converted to LAA January 1942; disbanded March 1943
- 239th Anti-Aircraft 'Z' Training Regiment, Royal Artillery – formed March 1941; converted to LAA January 1942; converted to No 1 Primary Training Centre October 1943
- 240th Light Anti-Aircraft Training Regiment, Royal Artillery – formed by July 1941
- 240th Anti-Aircraft 'Z' Training Regiment, Royal Artillery – formed August 1941; converted to HAA March 1944; converted to LAA February 1946
- 241st Light Anti-Aircraft Training Regiment, Royal Artillery – formed May 1942; disbanded September 1943
- 242nd Heavy Anti-Aircraft Training Regiment, Royal Artillery – formed May 1942; disbanded September 1943

== Overseas ==
- Hong Kong-Singapore Royal Artillery
- Royal Malta Artillery
- Bermuda Militia Artillery
- East African Artillery
- West African Artillery

== Bibliography ==
- Bellis, Malcolm A. (1995). Regiments of the British Army 1939–1945 (Artillery). London: Military Press International. ISBN 0-85420-110-6.
- Farndale, Martin (1996) [1988]. The Years of Defeat: Europe and North Africa, 1939–1941. History of the Royal Regiment of Artillery (repr. Brassey's ed.). London: Woolwich: Royal Artillery Institution. ISBN 1-85753-080-2.
- Farndale, Martin (2002). The Far East Theatre 1939–1946. History of the Royal Regiment of Artillery. London: Brassey's. ISBN 1-85753-302-X.
- Frederick, J. B. M. (1984). Lineage Book of British Land Forces 1660–1978. Vol. I. Wakefield: Microform Academic. ISBN 1-85117-007-3.
- Frederick, J. B. M. (1984). Lineage Book of British Land Forces 1660–1978. Vol. II. Wakefield: Microform Academic. ISBN 1-85117-009-X.
- Joslen, H. F. (2003) [1960]. Orders of Battle: Second World War, 1939–1945. Uckfield, East Sussex: Naval and Military Press. ISBN 978-1-84342-474-1.
- Litchfield, Norman E. H. (1992). The Territorial Artillery 1908–1988 (Their Lineage, Uniforms and Badges). Nottingham: Sherwood Press. ISBN 0-9508205-2-0.
- Routledge, Brigadier N.W. (1994). Anti-Aircraft Artillery 1914–55. History of the Royal Regiment of Artillery. London: Royal Artillery Institution/Brassey's. ISBN 1-85753-099-3.
- Watson, Graham E.; Rinaldi, Richard A. (2018). The Corps of Royal Engineers: Organization and Units 1889–2018. Tiger Lily Books. ISBN 978-171790180-4.

== External sources ==
- Land Forces of Britain, the Empire and Commonwealth – Regiments.org (archive site)
- Royal Artillery 1939–1945
