= 171st Regiment =

171st Regiment may refer to:

- 171st Aviation Regiment, United States
- 171st Field Artillery Regiment, United States
- 171st Field Regiment, Royal Artillery, Britain
- 171st Ohio Infantry Regiment, Union Army
