= 20th Regiment Royal Artillery =

Former regiment of the British Army

20th Anti-Tank Regiment 20th Field Regiment 20th Medium Regiment 20th Light Regiment
- Active: 1947 - March 1976
- Disbanded: Put into Suspended Animation: 20 March 1976
- Country: United Kingdom
- Branch: British Army
- Type: Royal Artillery
- Role: Anti-Tank; Light Artillery
- Size: Regiment
- Part of: British Forces Hong Kong
- Garrison/HQ: Last garrison: Borneo Lines, Sek Kong Camp

The 20th Anti-Tank Regiment was a former regiment of the Royal Artillery within the British Army.

== History ==
The 20th Regiment can trace their history back the 6th Anti-Tank Regiment. In 1947 after the post-war reforms of the British army, the regiment was re-designated as the 20th Anti-Tank Regiment, Royal Artillery. At the time, its creation, the regiment consisted of the 2nd, 8th, 44th, and 82nd Anti-Tank Batteries.

At its official creation the regiment was stationed in North West Europe still from the end of the war. (Note: Another references shows Egypt) In 1948 the regiment was moved out of mainland Europe and moved to Dundonald Camp, Troon. At that point the regiment had 12th and 107th Field Batteries and 27th and 45th Anti-Tank Batteries. In October of the same year the 12th and 107th batteries converted to field artillery. Later in November 1950 the regiment was re-designated as the 20th Field Regiment and equipped with the 25 Pounder. Three months later moving to Cherry Tree Barracks, Colchester. The next year in 1952 the regiment moved to Quarry Camp in Hong Kong.

During the mid 1950s regiment later participated in the later stages of the Korean War. During the end of the war the regiment was awarded the right to fire the last artillery round in Korea. After the end of the war in 1953 the regiment moved back to Hong Kong at Shek Kong Camp. Later in 1955 the regiment moved back the United Kingdom after almost four years away moving to Cambridge Barracks in Woolwich. Although the regiment technically didn't move to the barracks (Note: It was only temporary due to barracks issues) and moved later that year to Kirkee Barracks in Colchester. In 1958 as a result of the 1957 Defence White Paper the regiment lost 45 and 107 batteries as they were put into Suspended Animation. As a result, 27 and 43 batteries joined the regiment. In 1958 the regiment deployed to Cyprus. Yet again, in 1961 the regiment moved again, back to Asia in Saint Barbara Barracks in Tampin. Two years later the regiment moved back to the United Kingdom at Barford Camp at Barnard Castle.

In September 1963, the regiment was converted to a medium regiment equipped with the BL 5.5-inch Medium Gun. The next year the regiment was re-designated as the 20th Medium Regiment. In 1965 the regiment moved to Saint Barbara Barracks in Fallingbostel. While in West Germany the regiment was part of the 1st Field Artillery Brigade. Later in early 1966 the regiment was re-titled to the 20th Heavy Regiment and equipped with the M107 heavy self-propelled gun. Again in 1971 the regiment moved again, to Hopton Barracks in Devizes. In November of the same year the regiment gained its old title back, as the 20th Medium Regiment, and was re-equipped with the BL 5.5-inch Medium Gun. From June - October 1972 the regiment served in Derry and again the same time the next year, and yet again the same time frame in 1974.

Finally, in late 1974 the regiment was re-designated as the 20th Light Regiment and equipped with the older M3 howitzer. The following year, in 1975, the regiment moved to Borneo Lines at Shek Kong Camp. In March 1976 the regiment was placed in suspended animation along with 27 battery. The other two batteries, 12 and 43 were moved to other regiments, 32nd Regiment and 43rd Regiment respectively.

== Batteries ==
The regiment at some time included the following batteries:

- 2 Battery
- 8 Battery
- 12 Battery
- 27 Battery
- 43 Battery
- 44 Battery
- 45 Battery
- 82 Battery
- 107 Battery
