= 104th Light Anti-Aircraft Regiment, Royal Artillery =

13th Battalion, South Staffordshire Regiment 104th Light Anti-Aircraft Regiment, RA
- Cap badge of the Royal Artillery
- Active: 1 May 1940 – 15 June 1944
- Country: United Kingdom
- Branch: British Army
- Role: Infantry; Air defence
- Size: Battalion; Regiment
- Engagements: Italian Campaign

The 104th Light Anti-Aircraft Regiment, Royal Artillery, (104th LAA Rgt) was an air defence unit of the British Army during World War II. Initially raised as an infantry battalion of the South Staffordshire Regiment in 1940, it transferred to the Royal Artillery in late 1941. It served in the Middle East and Italy until it was disbanded for infantry reinforcements in June 1944.

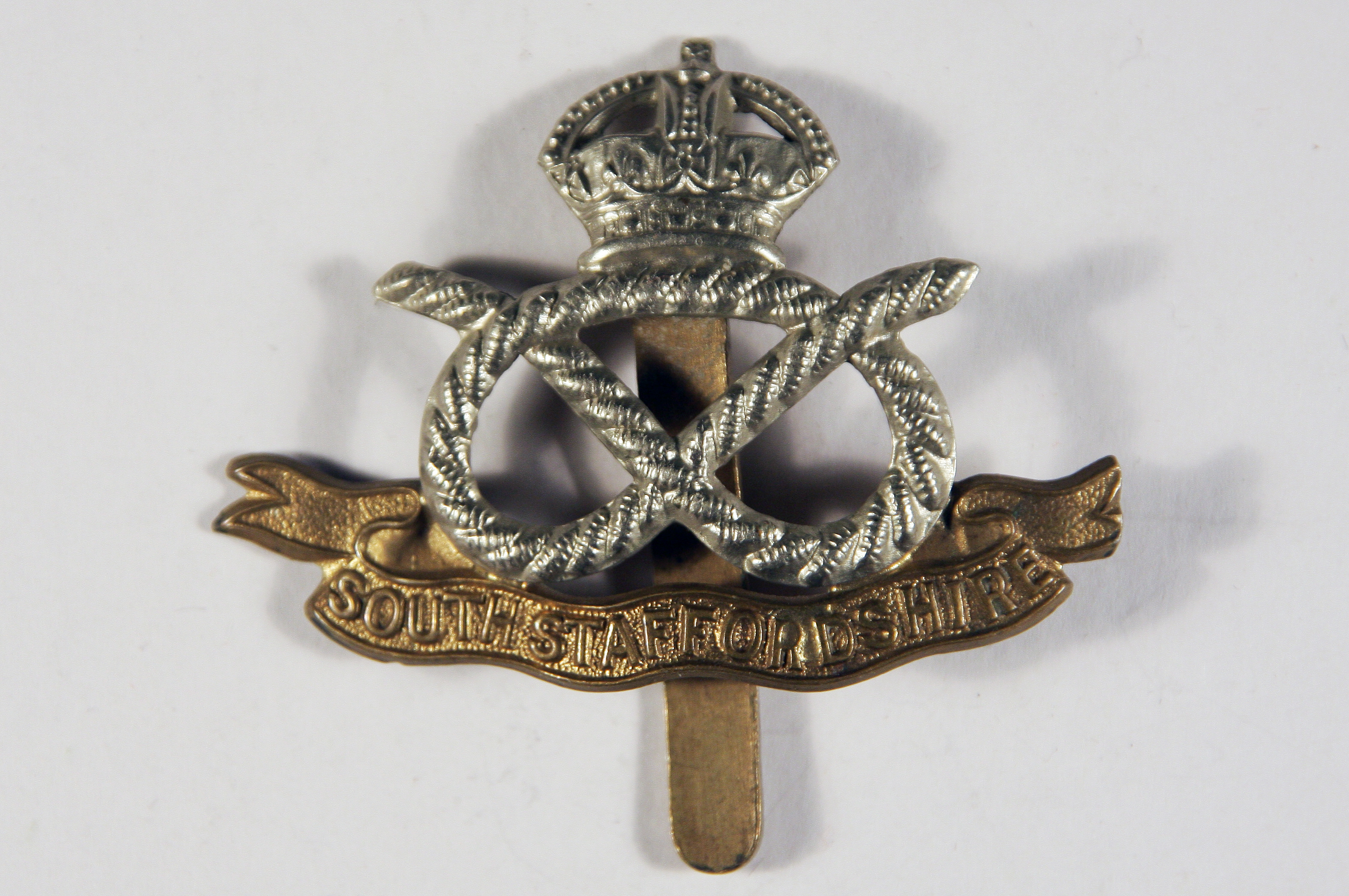
The South Staffordshires' cap badge.

== 13th (Pioneer) Battalion, South Staffordshire Regiment ==
The unit was originally formed on 1 May 1940 at Trowbridge, Wiltshire, as 13th (Pioneer) Battalion, South Staffordshire Regiment. As a pioneer battalion, the 12th does not appear to have been assigned to any field force or home defence formation. However it was converted into a normal infantry battalion on 24 October 1940 and it joined 213th Independent Infantry Brigade (Home), a static defence formation under II Corps in East Anglia.

At the end of 1941 the battalion was selected to be retrained in the light anti-aircraft (LAA) role equipped with Bofors 40 mm guns: on 1 December 1941 it transferred to the Royal Artillery (RA) as 104th LAA Regiment, comprising Regimental Headquarters (RHQ) and 342, 343 and 344 LAA Batteries.

== 104th Light Anti-Aircraft Regiment ==
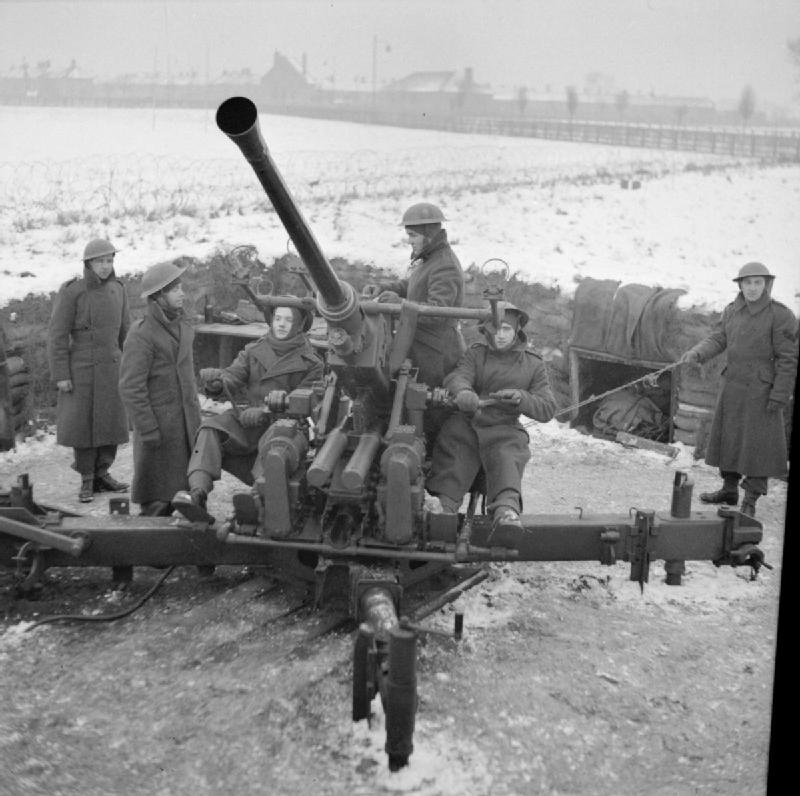
A Bofors 40 mm LAA gun crew under training, January 1942.

After initial training the regiment joined Anti-Aircraft Command, but left in February 1942 before it had been allocated to a brigade. At first it formed part of the War Office Reserve, but by April it came under the command of XII Corps District in South East England. In October 1942 the regiment was joined by a Royal Electrical and Mechanical Engineers (REME) workshop sub-section for each battery in preparation for mobile warfare. By mid-December it had come under War Office control preparatory to going overseas. It embarked in early February 1943.

=== Middle East ===
In May 1943 104th LAA Rgt regiment was in Middle East Forces and joined 8th AA Brigade at El Tahag in Egypt. The North African campaign having ended, Egypt was now a rear area and the regiment was non-operational, but 8th AA Bde was in training for the forthcoming Italian campaign. By 10 July 1943 the regiment had transferred to Ninth Army in Palestine and Syria.

=== Disbandment ===
104th LAA Regiment left Ninth Army before the end of 1943 and by April 1944 it was in Italy. However, by now the Allies had achieved air superiority over the peninsula and there was little call for AA defence. Meanwhile, British forces in Italy were suffering an acute manpower shortage. In June 1944 the Chiefs of Staff decided that given the reduced activity of the Luftwaffe the number of AA regiments in Italy could be reduced, their surplus personnel being converted to other roles, particularly infantry. 104th LAA Regiment was accordingly disbanded on 15 June 1944
