= 171st Field Regiment, Royal Artillery =

1st & 2nd Defence Regiments, RA 171st Field Regiment, RA 171st Heavy Regiment, RA
- Royal Artillery cap badge
- Active: 4 October 1940 – 25 January 1946
- Country: United Kingdom
- Branch: British Army
- Role: Field artillery
- Size: 3 Batteries
- Part of: 45th Infantry Division

The 171st Field Regiment was a unit of Britain's Royal Artillery (RA) during World War II. Originally formed to man beach defence batteries, it later became field artillery and briefly converted to heavy artillery. It served in Home Forces and supplied trained gunners to the fighting fronts, but saw no active service. It was disbanded after the war.

== 1st and 2nd Defence Regiments ==
After the British Expeditionary Force was evacuated from Dunkirk and the United Kingdom was threatened with invasion, a crash programme of installing coastal artillery batteries was implemented in the summer of 1940.

Later, as the Home Defence strategy developed, the Royal Artillery formed a number of 'Defence Batteries' to deploy around the coastline for general beach defence. These were not part of the RA's Coast Artillery branch, nor were they included in the field forces under Commander-in-Chief, Home Forces, but equipped with whatever old guns were available they freed up scarce field artillery from static beach defence for the mobile counter-attack forces. Most of these batteries were formed on 1 September 1940, and they were grouped into regiments from 4 October, including:

- 1st Defence Regiment formed at Chelmsford in Essex with 903, 904 and 905 Defence Btys
- 2nd Defence Regiment formed at Saxmundham in Norfolk with 907, 908 and 909 Defence Btys.

On 15 March 1941 the defence regiments were reorganised: 1st Defence Rgt was disbanded, except 905 Bty, which joined 2nd Defence Rgt replacing 909 Bty, which was disbanded about this time.

== 171st Field Regiment ==
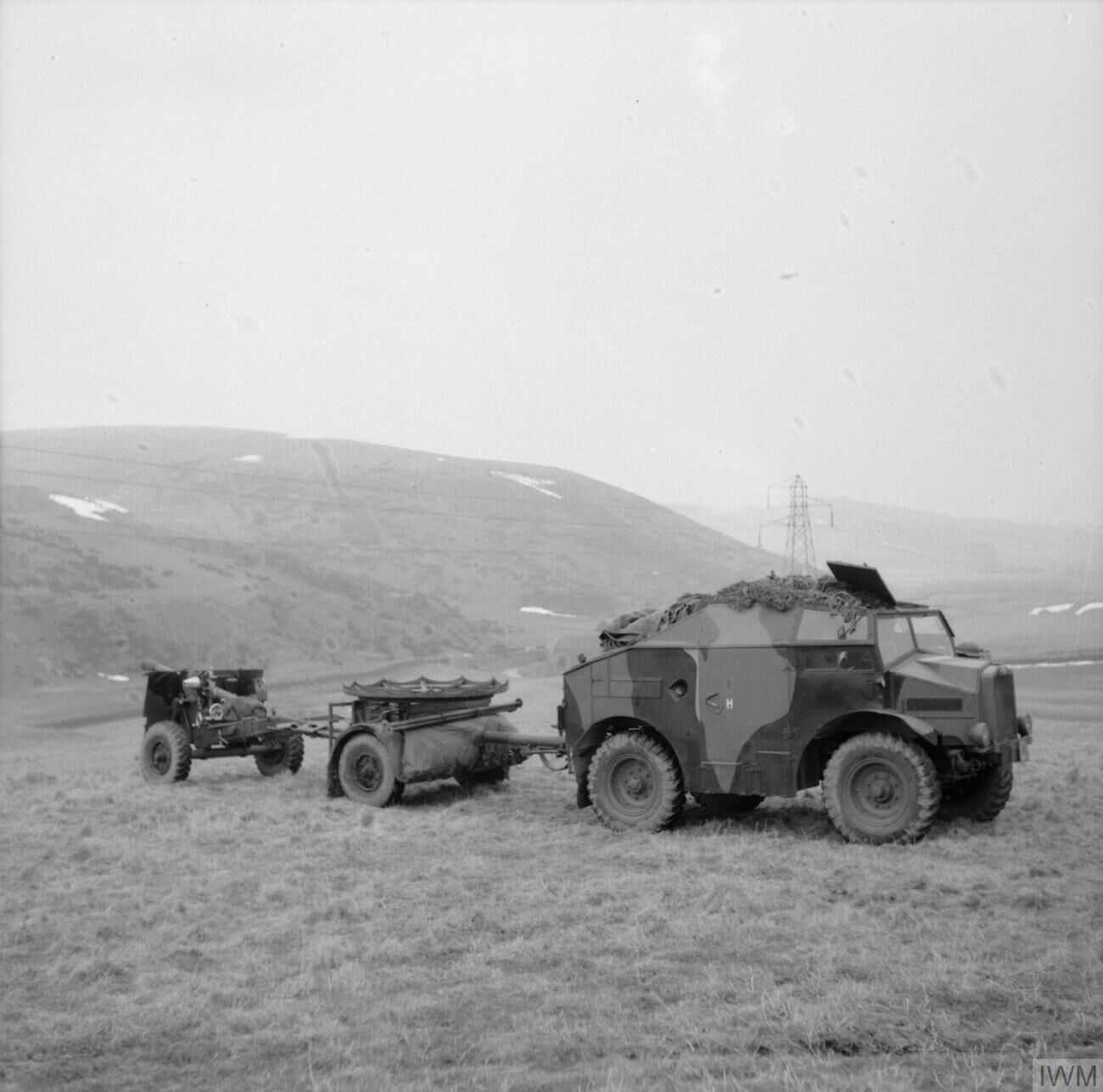
A 25-pounder gun and Quad tractor on a training exercise in the UK.

By the beginning of 1942 the imminent threat of invasion had passed, the coast artillery batteries were fully established, and the RA required gunners for the field forces. The remaining Defence Regiments in the UK were disbanded or converted into field artillery. On 12 January 1942 2nd Defence Rgt was converted into 171st Field Regiment, and 905, 907 and 908 Defence Btys were designated A, B and C; they were redesignated P, Q and R on 11 March. At this period the establishment of a field regiment was three batteries, each of two troops of four 25-pounder guns.

Divisional insignia of 45th Infantry Division.

On 11 February 1942 the regiment was assigned to 45th Infantry Division, which had recently been placed on a lower establishment as a home defence formation with no immediate prospect of overseas service. At the time the division was in II Corps District covering the Essex coast.

On 1 January 1943 the regiment's batteries were numbered as 150, 151 and 152 Field Btys, (Note: Previous batteries numbered 150 and 151 had been formed in the Royal Field Artillery in 1901, but disbanded in 1913 and 1905 respectively.) and immediately 152 Bty was exchanged with 571 Bty from 195th Field Rgt, a new unit in a newly formed 80th Infantry (Reserve) Division; however the batteries exchanged numbers, so that 171st Field Rgt continued to command 150, 151 and 152 Field Btys.

On 3 February 1943 the division was shipped to Northern Ireland, where it continued training. It remained there until the end of the year, when it returned to the mainland on 21 December. The primary role of the lower-establishment divisions was now to provide trained reinforcements to units serving in active theatres. After D Day on 6 June 1944 this was mainly to 21st Army Group fighting in Normandy. Having supplied most of its manpower in this way, 45th Division was broken up on 30 August 1944.

== 171st Heavy Regiment ==
171st Field Rgt remained in existence, and on 15 February 1945, while stationed at Bexhill-on-Sea, East Sussex, it was converted into 171st Heavy Regiment; 150, 151 and 152 Field Btys were disbanded and replaced by three existing batteries that were now regimented:

- 7 Heavy Bty – joined from 56th (Highland) Medium Rgt
- 35 Heavy Bty – formed 1 January 1945
- 36 Heavy Bty – converted from 16 Super Heavy Bty in 2nd Super Heavy Rgt (which was disbanding)

The regiment was assigned to 47th Infantry (Reserve) Division. This was an agglomeration of reserve formations and units including (unusually for an infantry division) both a heavy (171st) and a medium (56th (Highland)) artillery regiment.

However, shortly after the end of the war in Europe, the regiment reverted to 171st Field Rgt on 19 May 1945. It retained its heavy batteries (or what remained of them) and was joined at Bexhill by new 150 and 151 Field Btys reformed at Mundford in Norfolk on 12 May. It remained in 47th Division until the end of the war. The regiment and its batteries were finally disbanded on 25 January 1946.
