= Battle of Monte Cassino order of battle January 1944 =

The Battle of Monte Cassino order of battle for January 1944, is a listing of the significant formations involved in the fighting on the Winter Line in January 1944, during the period generally known as the First Battle of Monte Cassino.

== Allied armies in Italy ==
C-in-C: General Sir Harold Alexander
Chief of Staff: Lieutenant-General Sir John Harding

=== US Fifth Army ===
Lieutenant General Mark W. Clark

==== British X Corps (left) ====
Lieutenant-General Sir Richard McCreery

British 5th Infantry Division
Major-General Gerald Bucknall to 22 January, then
Major-General P. G. S. Gregson-Ellis

13th Infantry Brigade (Brigadier L. M. Campbell)

2nd Battalion, Cameronians (Scottish Rifles)
2nd Battalion, Royal Inniskilling Fusiliers
2nd Battalion, Wiltshire Regiment

15th Infantry Brigade (Brigadier E. O. Martin until 22 January then Brigadier John Yeldham Whitfield)

1st Battalion, Green Howards
1st Battalion, King's Own Yorkshire Light Infantry
1st Battalion, York and Lancaster Regiment

17th Infantry Brigade (Brigadier Dudley Ward)

2nd Battalion, Royal Scots Fusiliers
2nd Battalion, Northamptonshire Regiment
6th Battalion, Seaforth Highlanders

201st Guards Brigade (under command) (Brigadier R. B. R. Colvin)

6th Battalion, Grenadier Guards
3rd Battalion, Coldstream Guards
2nd Battalion, Scots Guards

Divisional troops

91st (4th London) Field Regiment, Royal Artillery
92nd (5th London) Field Regiment, Royal Artillery
98th (Surrey & Sussex Yeomanry Queen Mary's) Field Regiment, Royal Artillery
156th (Lanarkshire Yeomanry) Field Regiment, Royal Artillery
102nd (Pembroke Yeomanry) Medium Regiment, Royal Artillery
52nd (6th London) Anti-Tank Regiment, Royal Artillery
18th Light Anti-aircraft Regiment, Royal Artillery
215th (Gosport & Fareham) Heavy Anti-Aircraft Battery, Royal Artillery
5th Reconnaissance Regiment
50th Royal Tank Regiment (One squadron attached from Corps troops)
7th Battalion, Cheshire Regiment (Machine gun)
245th, 252nd and 38th Field companies, Royal Engineers
254th Field Park Company, RE
18th Bridge Platoon, RE

British 46th Infantry Division
Major-General John Hawkesworth

128th Infantry Brigade (Brigadier Manley Angell James)

2nd Battalion, Hampshire Regiment
1/4th Battalion, Hampshire Regiment
5th Battalion, Hampshire Regiment

138th Infantry Brigade (Brigadier G. P. Harding)

6th Battalion, Lincolnshire Regiment
2/4th Battalion, King's Own Yorkshire Light Infantry
6th Battalion, York and Lancaster Regiment

139th Infantry Brigade (Brigadier R. E. H. Stott)

2/5th Battalion, Leicestershire Regiment
5th Battalion, Sherwood Foresters
16th Battalion, Durham Light Infantry

Divisional troops

70th (West Riding) Field Regiment, Royal Artillery
71st (West Riding) Field Regiment, Royal Artillery
172nd Field Regiment, Royal Artillery
5th Medium Regiment, Royal Artillery
58th (Duke of Wellington's Regiment) Anti-Tank Regiment, Royal Artillery
115th Light Anti-Aircraft Regiment, Royal Artillery
215th Heavy Anti-aircraft Battery, Royal Artillery
46th Reconnaissance Regiment
2nd Battalion, Royal Northumberland Fusiliers (Machine gun)
270th, 271st and 272nd Field companies, Royal Engineers
273rd Field Park Company, RE
201st Bridge Platoon, RE
40th Royal Tank Regiment (attached from Corps troops)

British 56th Infantry Division
Major-General Gerald Templer

167th (London) Infantry Brigade (Brigadier C. E. A. Firth until 29 January then Brigadier J. Scott-Elliott)

8th Battalion, Royal Fusiliers
9th Battalion, Royal Fusiliers
7th Battalion, Oxfordshire and Buckinghamshire Light Infantry

168th (London) Infantry Brigade (Brigadier K. C. Davidson)

10th Battalion, Royal Berkshire Regiment
1st Battalion, London Scottish
1st Battalion, London Irish Rifles

169th (London) Infantry Brigade (Brigadier L. O. Lyne)

2/5th Battalion, Queen's Royal Regiment (West Surrey)
2/6th Battalion, Queen's Royal Regiment (West Surrey)
2/7th Battalion, Queen's Royal Regiment (West Surrey)

Divisional troops

64th (7th London) Field Regiment, Royal Artillery
65th (8th London) Field Regiment, Royal Artillery
113th (Home Counties) Field Regiment, Royal Artillery
142nd (Royal Devon Yeomanry) Field Regiment, Royal Artillery
51st (Midland) Medium Regiment, Royal Artillery
67th Anti-Tank Regiment, Royal Artillery
100th Light Anti-Aircraft Regiment, Royal Artillery
214th (Southsea) Heavy Anti-aircraft Battery, Royal Artillery
44th Reconnaissance Regiment
6th Battalion, Cheshire Regiment (Machine gun)
220th and 221st Field Companies, Royal Engineers
501st (London) Field Company, Royal Engineers
563rd Field Park Company, RE
40th Royal Tank Regiment (One squadron attached from Corps troops

Corps troops

British 23rd Armoured Brigade (Brigadier Robert Arkwright)

40th Royal Tank Regiment (less detachments)
50th Royal Tank Regiment (less detachments)
11th Battalion, King's Royal Rifle Corps

2nd Special Service Brigade (Brigadier T. B. L. Churchill)

No. 9 Commando
No. 10 (Inter Allied) Commando
No. 40 (Royal Marine) Commando
No. 43 (Royal Marine) Commando (less detachments)

2nd Army Group Royal Artillery (under command)

78th (Lowland) Field Regiment, Royal Artillery
69th (Caernarvon & Denbigh Yeomanry) Medium Regiment, Royal Artillery
74th Medium Regiment, Royal Artillery
140th (5th London) Medium Regiment, Royal Artillery
56th Heavy Regiment, Royal Artillery
146th (Pembroke & Cardiganshire) Field Regiment, Royal Artillery

==== US II Corps (centre) ====
Major-General Geoffrey Keyes

US 1st Armored Division
Major General Ernest N. Harmon

Armor

1st Armored Regiment
13th Armored Regiment

Infantry

6th Armored Infantry Regiment

Artillery

27th, 68th and 91st Armored Field Artillery Battalions

Divisional troops

16th Engineer Battalion
81st Reconnaissance Squadron
601st Tank Destroyer Battalion (Self Propelled) (Attached)

US 34th Infantry Division
Major General Charles W. Ryder)

Infantry

133rd Infantry Regiment
135th Infantry Regiment
168th Infantry Regiment

Artillery

125th, 151st and 175th Field Artillery Battalions (105mm)
185th Field Artillery Battalion (155mm)

Divisional troops

109th Engineer Battalion

US 36th Infantry Division
Major General Fred L. Walker

Infantry

141st Infantry Regiment
142nd Infantry Regiment
143rd Infantry Regiment

CMoH recipient: Sgt. Thomas E. McCall

Artillery

131st, 132nd and 133rd (105 mm) Artillery Battalions
155th (155 mm) Artillery Battalion

Divisional troops

111th Engineer Battalion

1st Special Service Force (Brigadier-General Robert T. Frederick)

3 Regiments of two battalions. Each battalion two companies.
1 battery airborne artillery

I Motorized Grouping (Brigadier-General Vincenzo Dapino)

67th Infantry Regiment "Legnano"
11th Motorized Artillery Regiment
V Anti-tank Battalion
LI Bersaglieri Battalion
One engineer battalion

==== French Expeditionary Corps (right) ====
General Alphonse Juin

3rd Algerian Infantry Division
Major-General Joseph de Goislard de Monsabert

3rd Algerian Tirailleurs Regiment (3 battalions)
4th Tunisian Tirailleurs Regiment (3 battalions)
7th Algerian Tirailleurs Regiment (3 battalions)
4th Group of Tabors (3 tabors)
Divisional troops

67th African Artillery Regiment
83rd Engineer Battalion
3rd Algerian Spahis Reconnaissance Regiment

2nd Moroccan Infantry Division
Brigadier-General André M. Dody

4th Moroccan Tirailleurs Regiment (3 battalions)
5th Moroccan Tirailleurs Regiment (3 battalions)
8th Moroccan Tirailleurs Regiment (3 battalions)
3rd Group of Tabors (3 tabors)
Divisional troops

63rd African Artillery Regiment
87th Engineer Battalion
3rd Moroccan Spahis Reconnaissance Regiment

==== Fifth Army reserve ====
US 45th Infantry "Thunderbird" Division
Major General 'William W. Eagles

The 45th was sent to [Salerno] under Major General Troy H. Middleton. Major General William Eagles assumed command of the 45th in November 1943, and led the 45th in the fighting into the mountains north of Cassino, until 9 January 1944 until being sent to a rest area. They were sent to land at Anzio on 22 January 1944.

== German Army Group C ==
Commander:

Field Marshal Albert Kesselring

=== German Tenth Army ===
Commander: General (Generaloberst) Heinrich von Vietinghoff

==== XIV Panzer Corps ====
Lieutenant-General (General der Panzertruppe) Fridolin von Senger und Etterlin

5th Mountain Division (until 17 January) (Lieutenant General (General der Gebirgstruppe) Julius Ringel)

85th Mountain Regiment

3 battalions

100th Mountain Regiment

3 battalions

Divisional troops

95th Reconnaissance battalion
95th Mountain Artillery battalion
95th Anti-tank battalion
95th Mountain Engineer battalion

15th Panzer Grenadier Division (Major General (Generalleutnant) Eberhard Rodt)

104th Panzer Grenadier Regiment

3 battalions

115th Panzer Grenadier Regiment

3 battalions

129th Panzer Grenadier Regiment

3 battalions

Divisional troops

115th Armoured Reconnaissance battalion
115th Panzer battalion
33rd Artillery battalion
33rd Anti-tank battalion
115th Engineer battalion

44th Reichsgrenadier Division (Major General (Generalleutnant) Friedrich Franek)

131st Infantry Regiment

3 battalions

132nd Infantry Regiment

3 battalions

134th Infantry Regiment

3 battalions

Divisional troops

44th Fusilier battalion
96th Artillery Regiment
46th Anti-tank battalion
96th Engineer battalion

94th Infantry Division (Major General (Generalleutnant) Bernhard Steinmetz)

267th Infantry Regiment

3 battalions

274th Infantry Regiment

3 battalions

276th Infantry Regiment

3 battalions

Divisional troops

94th Fusilier battalion
194th Artillery Regiment
194th Anti-tank battalion
94th Engineer battalion

71st Infantry Division (from 17 January) (Major General (Generalleutnant) Wilhelm Raapke)

191st Infantry Regiment

3 battalions

194th Infantry Regiment

3 battalions

211th Infantry Regiment

3 battalions

Divisional troops

171st Fusilier battalion
171st Artillery Regiment
171st Anti-tank battalion
171st Engineer battalion

3rd Panzergrenadier Division (relieved 5th Mountain Division on 17 January) (Lieutenant General (General der Panzertruppen) Fritz-Hubert Gräser)

8th Panzer Grenadier Regiment

3 battalions

=== Army reserve ===
Fallschirm-Panzer-Division 1

==== German I Parachute Corps ====
Under Kesselring's direct command) (Note: Both divisions were released to XIV Panzer Corps on 18 January)
Lieutenant-General Alfred Schlemm

29th Panzergrenadier Division

15th Panzer Grenadier Regiment

3 battalions

71st Panzer Grenadier Regiment

3 battalions

Divisional troops

129th Armoured Reconnaissance battalion
129th Panzer battalion
29th Artillery Regiment
29th Anti-tank battalion
29th Engineer battalion

90th Panzergrenadier Division

155th Panzer Grenadier Regiment

3 battalions

200th Panzer Grenadier Regiment

3 battalions

361st Panzer Grenadier Regiment

3 battalions

Divisional troops

190th Armoured Reconnaissance battalion
190th Panzer battalion
190th Artillery Regiment
90th Anti-tank battalion
90th Engineer battalion

== Notes ==
Footnotes

Citations

== Sources ==
- Ellis, John (2003) [1984]. Cassino, The Hollow Victory: The Battle for Rome, January-June 1944. London: Arum Press. ISBN 1-85410-916-2.
- Houterman, Hans; Koppes, Jeroen. "World War II unit histories and officers". Archived from the original on 26 June 2007.
- Joslen, H. F. (2003) [1st Pub. HMSO 1960]. Orders of battle : Second World War, 1939-1945. Uckfield: Naval & Military Press. ISBN 1-84342-474-6.
- Molony, Brigadier C.J.C.; with Flynn, Captain F.C. (R.N.); Davies, Major-General H.L. & Gleave, Group Captain T.P. (2004) [1st. pub. HMSO:1973]. Butler, Sir James (ed.). The Mediterranean and Middle East, Volume V: The Campaign in Sicily 1943 and The Campaign in Italy 3rd September 1943 to 31st March 1944. History of the Second World War, United Kingdom Military Series. Uckfield, UK: Naval & Military Press. ISBN 1-84574-069-6.
- "Orders of Battle.com". Archived from the original on 17 July 2007.
- Wendell, Marcus. "Axis History Factbook: German army order of battle". Archived from the original on 29 October 2006.
