= 6th Army Group Royal Artillery =

British Army unit

6th Army Group Royal Artillery (6 AGRA) was one of number of Army Group Royal Artillery units developed by the British Army to add weight of fire and increased artillery flexibility to the battlefield. It was one of the main AGRAs to fight in the Italian Campaign during the Second World War.

== History ==
Under the command of Brigadier Julian St. Clair Holbrook, 6th AGRA was created at the Royal Artillery Base Depot near Almaza, North Africa on 15 March 1943. As with all newly formed units, the Headquarters was established initially and the administrative centre set up. The men in charge chose the sixth sign of the Zodiac as their formation badge - this was worn on the right sleeve of the Battledress uniform, with the Eighth Army badge on the left sleeve.

The HQ 6th AGRA then moved to Beni Yusef, near Cairo in April 1943 to begin the task of establishing the numerous regiments that would form its order of battle. By the end of that month, the Group consisted of three Medium Regiments of the Royal Artillery as follows:

- 66th (Lowland) Medium Regiment, Royal Artillery
- 75th (Shropshire Yeomanry) Medium Regiment, Royal Artillery
- 80th (Scottish Horse Yeomanry) Medium Regiment, Royal Artillery

=== Operation Husky ===
The first action of 6th AGRA was during Operation Husky, the invasion of Sicily, with the advanced guard of 66th Medium Regiment landing on 10 July 1943 and the guns themselves being deployed and ready to fire by 12th.

=== Invasion of Italy ===
The AGRA then took part in the Allied invasion of Italy, firing across the strait of Messina onto Italian soil. For this operation, both 5th AGRA and 6th AGRA fired side by side. Through the Italian Campaign, 6th AGRA fought at Sangro, Monte Cassino, Arezzo, Florence, the assault on the Gothic Line. They held station on Monte Grande beside the British 1st Infantry Division over the winter of 1944/45, before beginning the Spring Offensive in the Po Valley.

6th AGRA finished the war in Austria, Brigadier Holbrook having left the formation three weeks prior to the final surrender of Axis forces in Europe. The AGRA was the commanded by Brigadier T. F. K. Howard, DSO, who following the war, gave this assessment of the AGRA and of his late command of the units in it: "It was like giving the final tap to a truly driven nail with a nicely balanced hammer. It was so nicely balanced too."

6th AGRA was disbanded in November 1945.

== Order of battle ==
During the various stages of its time in action, 6th AGRA's order of battle varied widely as regiments were seconded to it and other regiments were assigned elsewhere. The following is a list of all the units engaged within 6th AGRA at some time during its operational establishment, during the war:

- Headquarters 6th Army Group Royal Artillery
- 66th (Lowland) Medium Regiment, Royal Artillery
- 75th (Shropshire Yeomanry) Medium Regiment, Royal Artillery
- 76th (Shropshire Yeomanry) Medium Regiment, Royal Artillery
- 78th (Duke of Lancaster's Own Yeomanry) Medium Regiment, Royal Artillery
- 75th (Highland) Heavy Regiment, Royal Artillery
- Counter Battery Staff XIII Corps
- 80th (Scottish Horse Yeomanry) Medium Regiment, Royal Artillery
- 2nd Medium Regiment, Royal Artillery
- 69th (Caernarvon & Denbigh Yeomanry) Medium Regiment, Royal Artillery
- 61st Heavy Regiment, Royal Artillery
- 5th Medium Regiment, Royal Artillery
- 194th (U.S) F.A. Group
- 3rd Survey Regiment, Royal Artillery
- 376th (Artillery) Company, Royal Army Service Corps
- 655th Air O.P. Squadron, Royal Air Force
- 126th Meteorological Section, Royal Air Force
- 21st Canadian Meteorological Section, Royal Canadian Artillery
- 40th Squadron, South African Air Force
- 51st (London) Heavy Anti-Aircraft Regiment, Royal Artillery was temporarily assigned to 6th AGRA for the crossing of the Sangro and Biferno rivers at the end of November 1943. Its 3.7-inch AA guns supplemented the medium artillery in the long preparatory bombardment, and then switched to anti-aircraft protection of the assembly and bridgehead areas for the actual assault.

== Post-war ==
Brigadier Hollbrook later went on to command 86th AGRA (TA), a post-war Territorial Army Group Royal Artillery, which had command ties to the 6th AGRA, through Holbrook. The post-war 86th AGRA (TA) had a very similar sign to the 6th AGRA, but with the tail of the 'M' separated.

== See also ==
- 1st Army Group Royal Artillery
- 2nd Army Group Royal Artillery
- 8th Army Group Royal Artillery
- 9th Army Group Royal Artillery
