= Julian Holbrook =

British military personnel (1897–1980)

Julian Holbrook CBE MC
- Born: 7 August 1897; Church Crookham, Hampshire, England
- Died: 1980 (aged 82−83)
- Military career
- Allegiance: United Kingdom
- Branch: British Army
- Service years: 1915−1951
- Rank: Brigadier
- Service number: 11435
- Units: Royal Field Artillery; Royal Artillery
- Commands: 6th Army Group Royal Artillery
- Conflicts: First World War; Second World War
- Awards: Commander of the Order of the British Empire; Military Cross; Mentioned in dispatches (2)

Brigadier Julian St. Clair Holbrook CBE MC (7 August 1897 – 1980) was a British Army officer.

Holbrook was commissioned into the Royal Artillery on 21 April 1915, having attended the Royal Military Academy, Woolwich. He saw service in the First World War, during which he awarded the Military Cross. He saw further active service in the Waziristan campaign (1919–20), during which he was mentioned in dispatches. He was assistant embassy staff officer, India, in 1920. Between 1921 and 1931 he was with the No. 1 Special Battery, Royal Garrison Artillery, before moving to the 11th Field Brigade. He was promoted to major on 15 November 1935.

At the start of the Second World War Holbrook was instructor in gunnery, Home Forces. He was the commanding officer of the 73rd Anti Tank Regiment Royal Artillery during the North African Campaign between 1942 and 1943. He commanded the 6th Army Group Royal Artillery during the Allied invasion of Sicily and subsequently in mainland Italy. He was promoted to acting brigadier on 5 April 1943 and to temporary brigadier on 5 October 1943. He was mentioned in dispatches for a second time on 24 August 1944, and in December 1944 he was invested as a Commander of the Order of the British Empire. At the end of the war he was corps commander Royal Artillery III Corps. Between April 1949 and December 1951 Holbrook served as aide-de-camp to George VI, after which he retired.
