= 1st Army Group Royal Artillery =

- Royal Artillery cap badge (pre-1953)
- Active: 24 August 1942 – 1 January 1947; 31 May 1955 – 4 October 1961
- Country: United Kingdom
- Branch: British Army
- Role: Artillery headquarters
- Garrison/HQ: Glasgow
- Engagements: Tunisian campaign Italian campaign

1st Army Group Royal Artillery was a brigade-sized formation organised by Britain's Royal Artillery during World War II to command medium and heavy guns. It served in the final stages of the Tunisian Campaign and throughout the Italian Campaign. It reformed in the Territorial Army in the 1950s to command air defence units.

== History ==
=== Background and formation ===
The need for a higher organisational command structure for medium and heavy artillery became apparent during the Battle of France and the early part of the Western Desert Campaign. The Army Group Royal Artillery (AGRA) concept was developed during Exercise 'Bumper' held in the UK in 1941, organised by the commander of Home Forces, General Alan Brooke (himself a Gunner) with Lt-Gen Bernard Montgomery as chief umpire. This large anti-invasion exercise tested many of the tactical concepts that would be used by the British Army in the latter stages of the war. The gunnery tacticians developed the AGRAs as powerful artillery brigades, usually comprising three medium regiments and one heavy regiment, which could be rapidly moved about the battlefield, and had the punch to destroy enemy artillery with counter-battery (CB) fire. AGRAs were provided to field armies at a scale of about one per Army corps. AGRAs were improvised until 26 November 1942, when they were officially sanctioned, to consist of a commander (CAGRA) and staff to control non-divisional artillery.

=== World War II ===
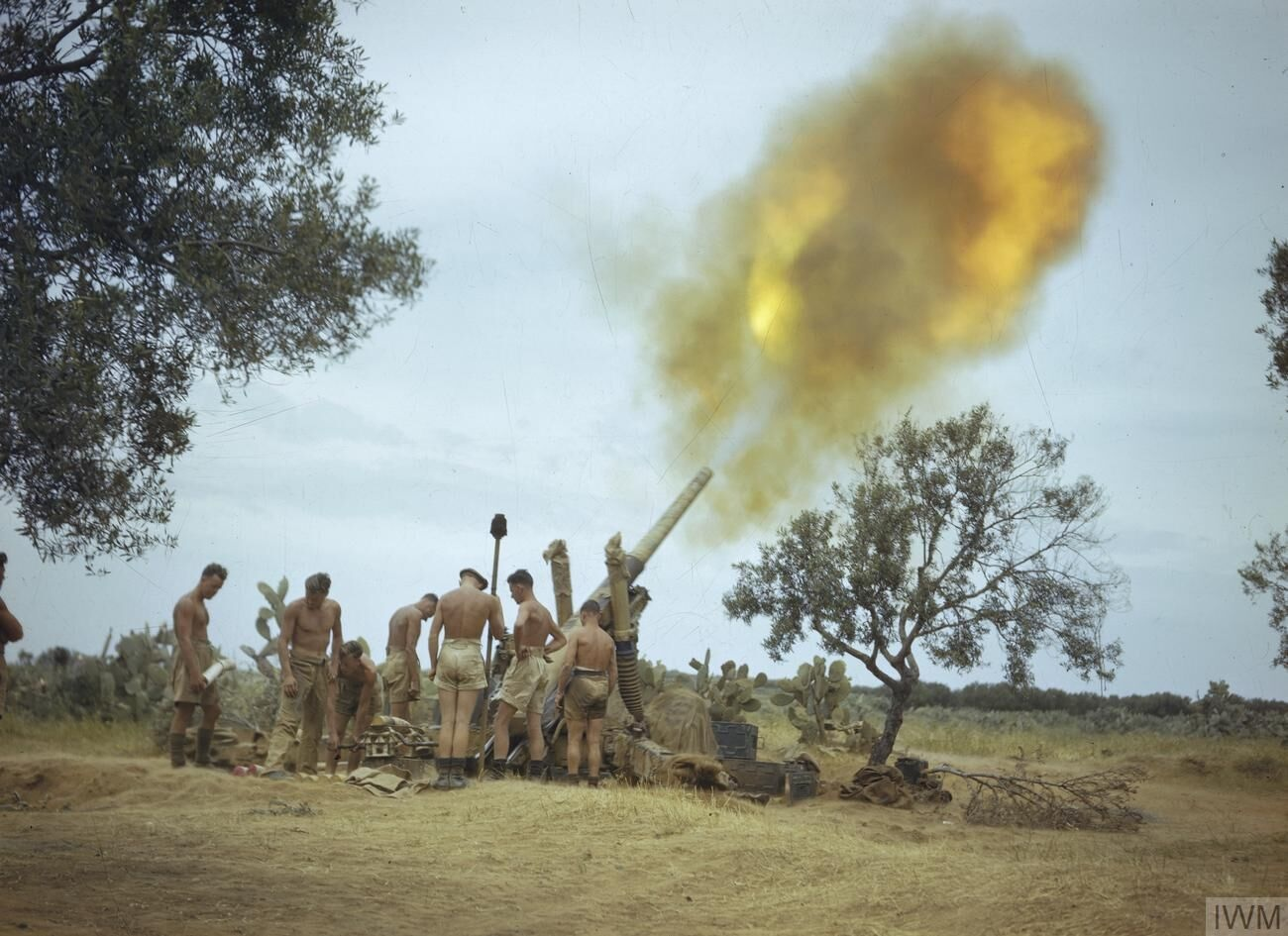
A British 4.5-inch gun firing in Tunisia, 1943.

The Headquarters (HQ) of 1st AGRA was formed at Hamilton Park, Glasgow, on 24 August 1942. It was assigned to First Army for the landings in North Africa (Operation Torch), and arrived in Tunisia in January 1943, together with 56th Heavy Regiment, equipped with 7.2-inch howitzers – the first heavy regiment of the RA to serve overseas since the Dunkirk evacuation in 1940. 1st AGRA went into action in February in support of XIX French Corps with one heavy, three medium and three field regiments under command. Later it supported V Corps in the closing stages of the campaign. It then prepared for the Allied invasion of Italy.

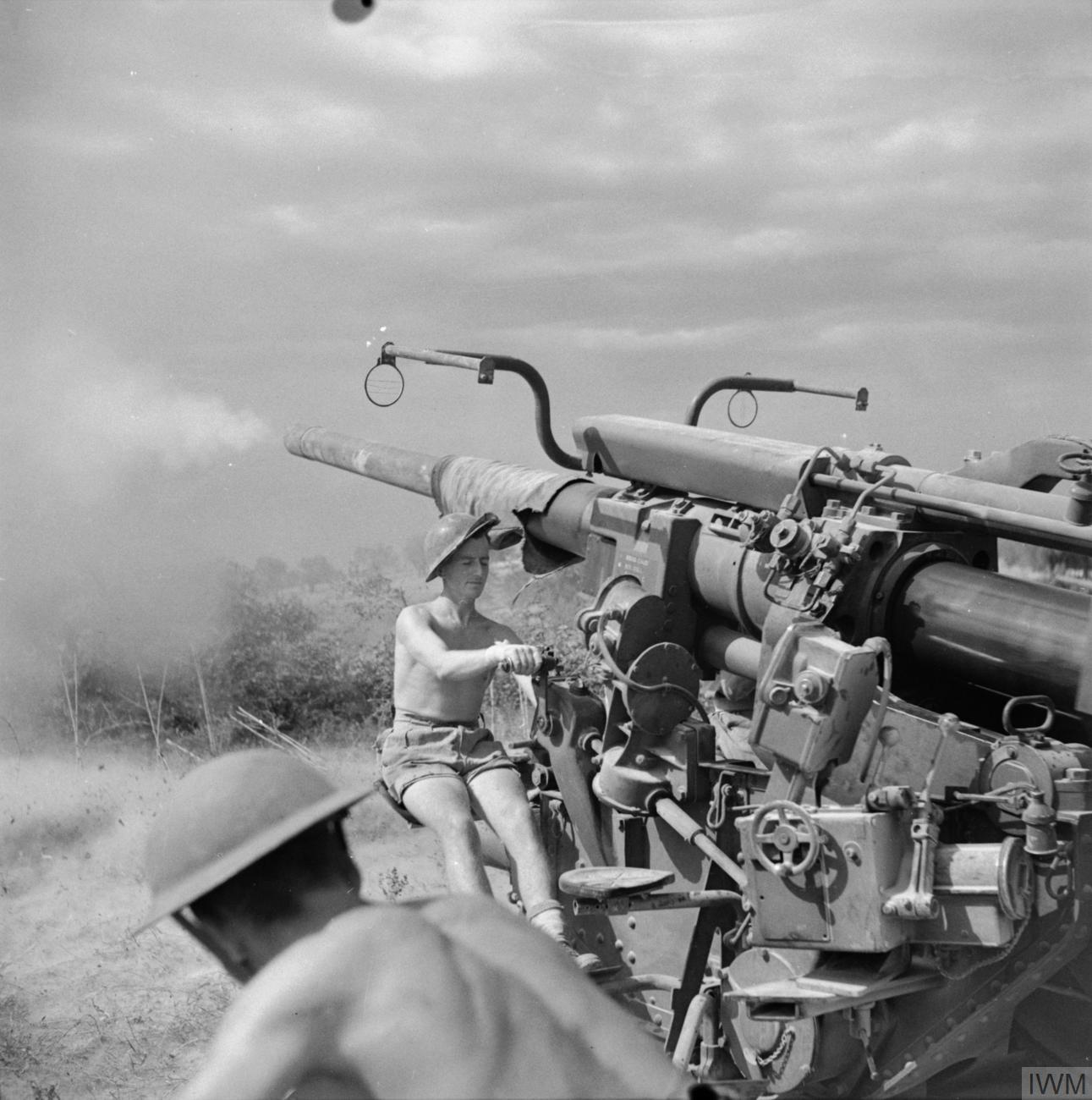
A 3.7-inch HAA gun firing in the ground support role in Italy.

The make-up of an AGRA during the Italian Campaign was extremely flexible: it could include army field regiments (25-pounders), medium regiments (4.5-inch or 5.5-inch guns) and heavy regiments with 7.2-inch howitzers. It might also be augmented with 3.7-inch heavy anti-aircraft (HAA) guns loaned by the AA brigades for additional ground support fire.

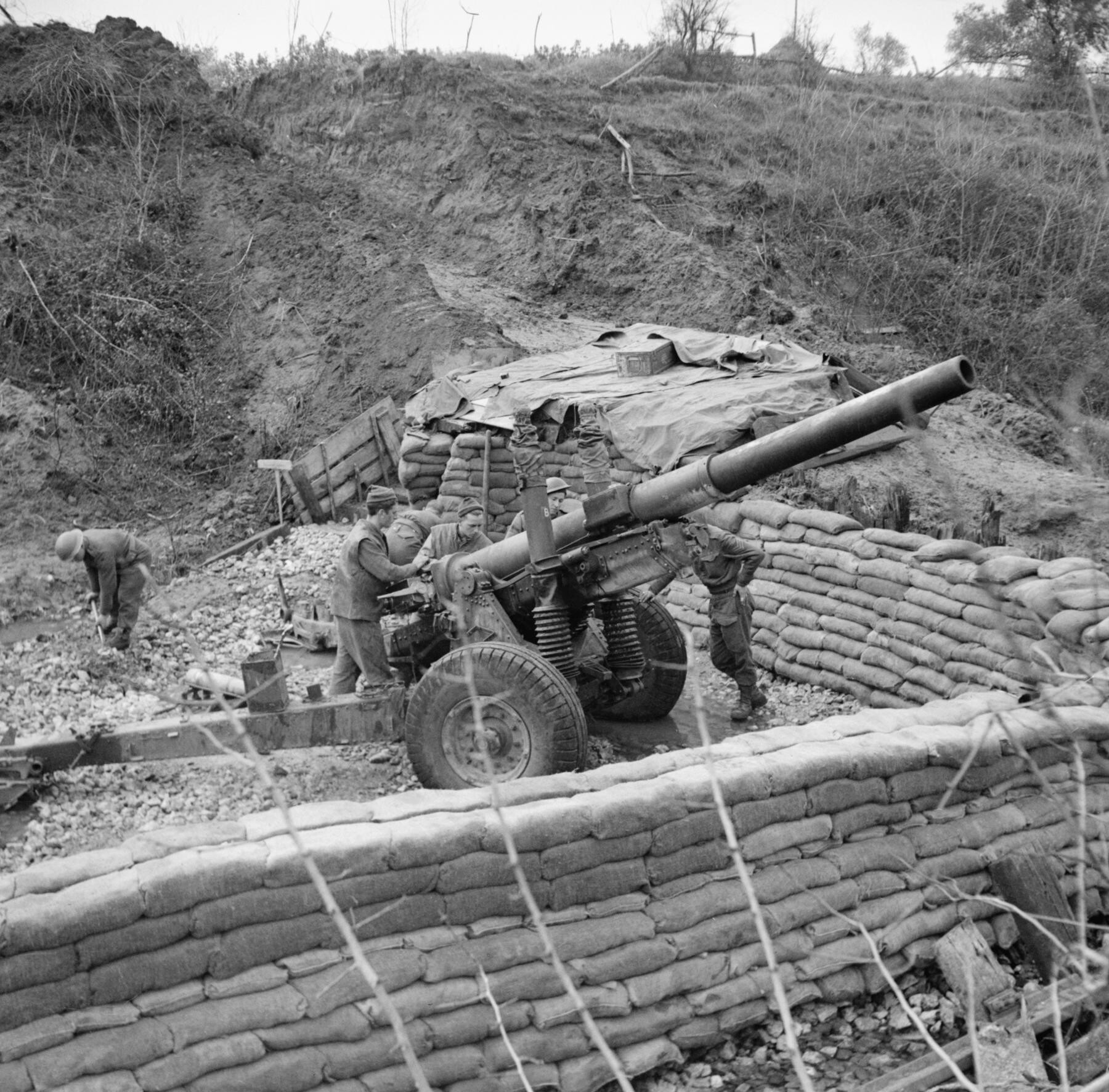
5.5-inch gun of a medium regiment in Italy, March 1944.

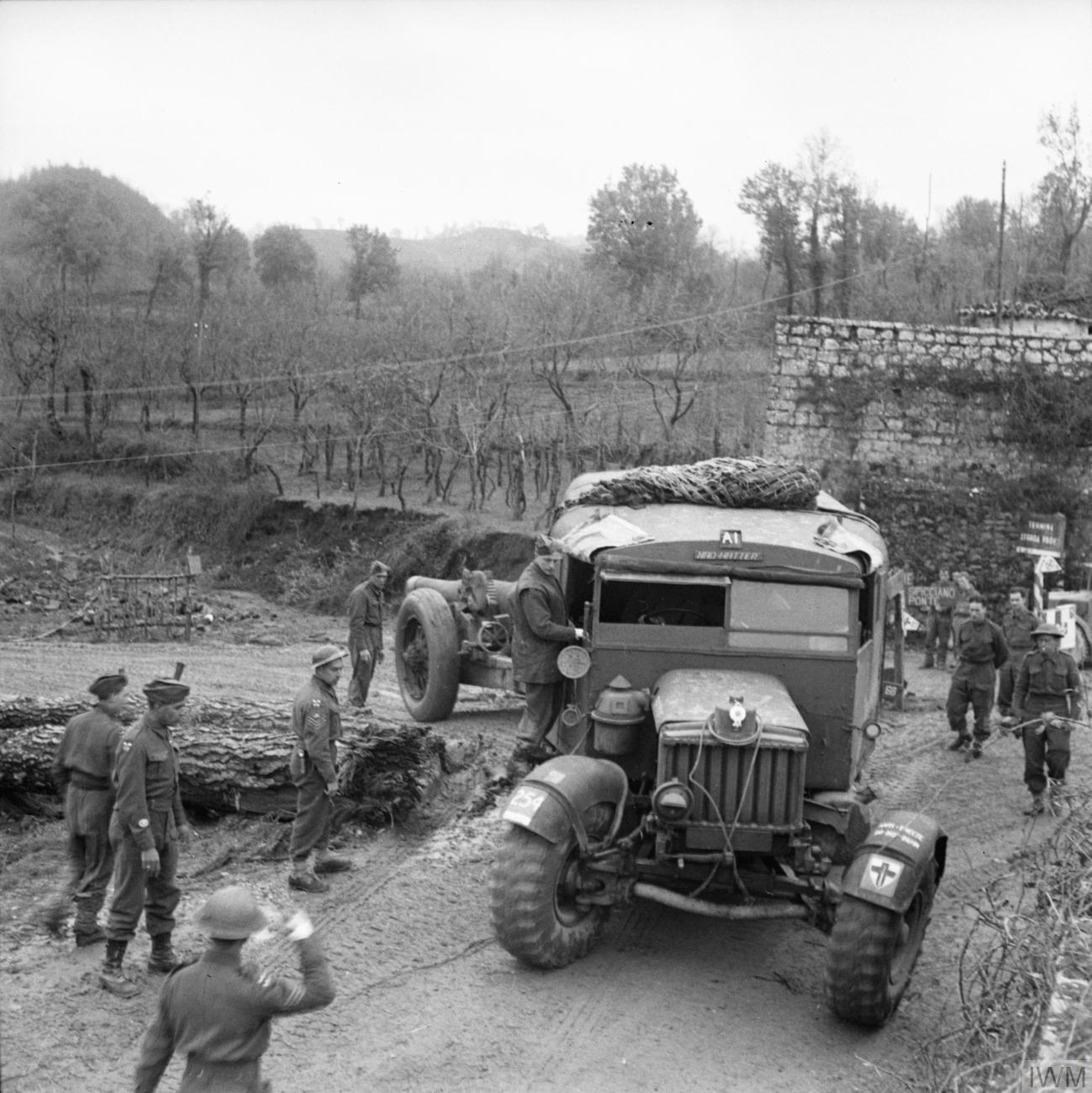
A Scammell Pioneer tractor towing a 7.2-inch howitzer round a tight corner in Italy, December 1943.

1st AGRA landed in Italy in October 1943, operating with V Corps again, this time under Eighth Army. For V Corps' attack on the Sangro in November 1943, 1st AGRA contributed 51st (Midland) Medium Regiment alongside the guns of 6th AGRA for a massive artillery concentration. It transferred temporarily to X Corps in February 1944, operating on the River Garigliano.

Both 1st and 6th AGRAs supported XIII Corps in July 1944 as it approached the Gothic Line. This time the front was so wide that control of the medium guns had to be decentralised to the individual divisions, so the two AGRAs only retained two medium regiments in addition to their two heavy regiments. However, when the 2nd New Zealand Division attacked on 29 July, it was supported by a concentration including the field artillery of 6th South African Armoured and 8th Indian Divisions as well as 1st AGRA, which was responsible for coordinating CB fire. 1st AGRA was assigned to V Corps for the assault on the Gothic Line (Operation Olive) in August 1944, and remained with it for the rest of the war.

1st AGRA fought at the Battle of the Argenta Gap in early 1945, ending the war at Padua.

=== Postwar ===
On 1 January 1947, 1st AGRA merged with 3rd AGRA as 3 AGRA (Field) in Central Mediterranean Forces, but was disbanded by late October that year.

Reformed at Troon, Ayrshire, between 24 April and 31 May 1955 by converting 68 Anti-Aircraft Brigade (the wartime 42nd AA Brigade at Glasgow) after Anti-Aircraft Command had been abolished on 1 March. It joined British Army of the Rhine as a Corps artillery HQ in 1958. In 1959 1 AGRA Signal Squadron of the Royal Corps of Signals was redesignated 218 Signal Squadron. On 19 September 1960 1 AGRA was redesignated 1st Artillery Brigade (United Kingdom) at Hildesheim, and 218 Signal Squadron was disbanded (a new squadron with the same number as reformed in 1969).

== Insignia ==
1st AGRA's formation badge was a shield in the RA colours of blue and red, divided vertically, with a vertical yellow cannon barrel superimposed in the centre; this was also used by 3 AGRA (Field) in 1947. 1 AGRA (Field), formed in 1955, adopted a ram's skull in black and white on a red background.

== See also ==
- 2nd Army Group Royal Artillery
- 6th Army Group Royal Artillery – British Army unit
- 8th Army Group Royal Artillery
- 9th Army Group Royal Artillery

== External sources ==
- British Army units from 1945 on
- British and Commonwealth Military Badge Forum
- The Royal Artillery 1939–45
