= 2nd Army Group Royal Artillery =

- Royal Artillery cap badge (pre-1953)
- Active: 24 August 1942–1945; 21 March 1955 – 1 April 1959
- Country: United Kingdom
- Branch: British Army
- Role: Artillery headquarters
- Garrison/HQ: Warrington (1955–59)
- Engagements: Tunisian campaign Italian campaign

2nd Army Group Royal Artillery was a brigade-sized formation organised by Britain's Royal Artillery (RA) during World War II to command medium and heavy guns. It served in the final stages of the Tunisian Campaign and throughout the Italian Campaign. It reformed in the Territorial Army in the 1950s to command air defence units.

== Background ==
The need for a higher organisational command structure for medium and heavy artillery became apparent during the Battle of France and the early part of the Western Desert Campaign. The 'Army Group Royal Artillery' (AGRA) concept was developed during Exercise 'Bumper' held in the UK in 1941, organised by the commander of Home Forces, General Alan Brooke (himself a Gunner) with Lt-Gen Bernard Montgomery as chief umpire. This large anti-invasion exercise tested many of the tactical concepts that would be used by the British Army in the latter stages of the war. The gunnery tacticians developed the AGRAs as powerful artillery brigades, usually comprising three medium regiments and one heavy regiment, which could be rapidly moved about the battlefield, and had the punch to destroy enemy artillery with counter-battery (CB) fire. AGRAs were provided to field armies at a scale of about one per Army corps. AGRAs were improvised until 26 November 1942, when they were officially sanctioned, to consist of a commander (CAGRA) and staff to control non-divisional artillery.

== World War II ==
First Army's formation badge, adopted by 2nd AGRA.

The Headquarters (HQ) of 2nd AGRA was formed at the Scotch Corner Hotel, Darlington, on 24 August 1942 from elements of Headquarters RA, First Army. It was assigned to First Army for the landings in North Africa (Operation Torch), and first went into action in March 1943, supporting IX Corps in Tunisia. It was with V Corps by the end of the campaign in May 1943, and then prepared for the Allied invasion of Italy.

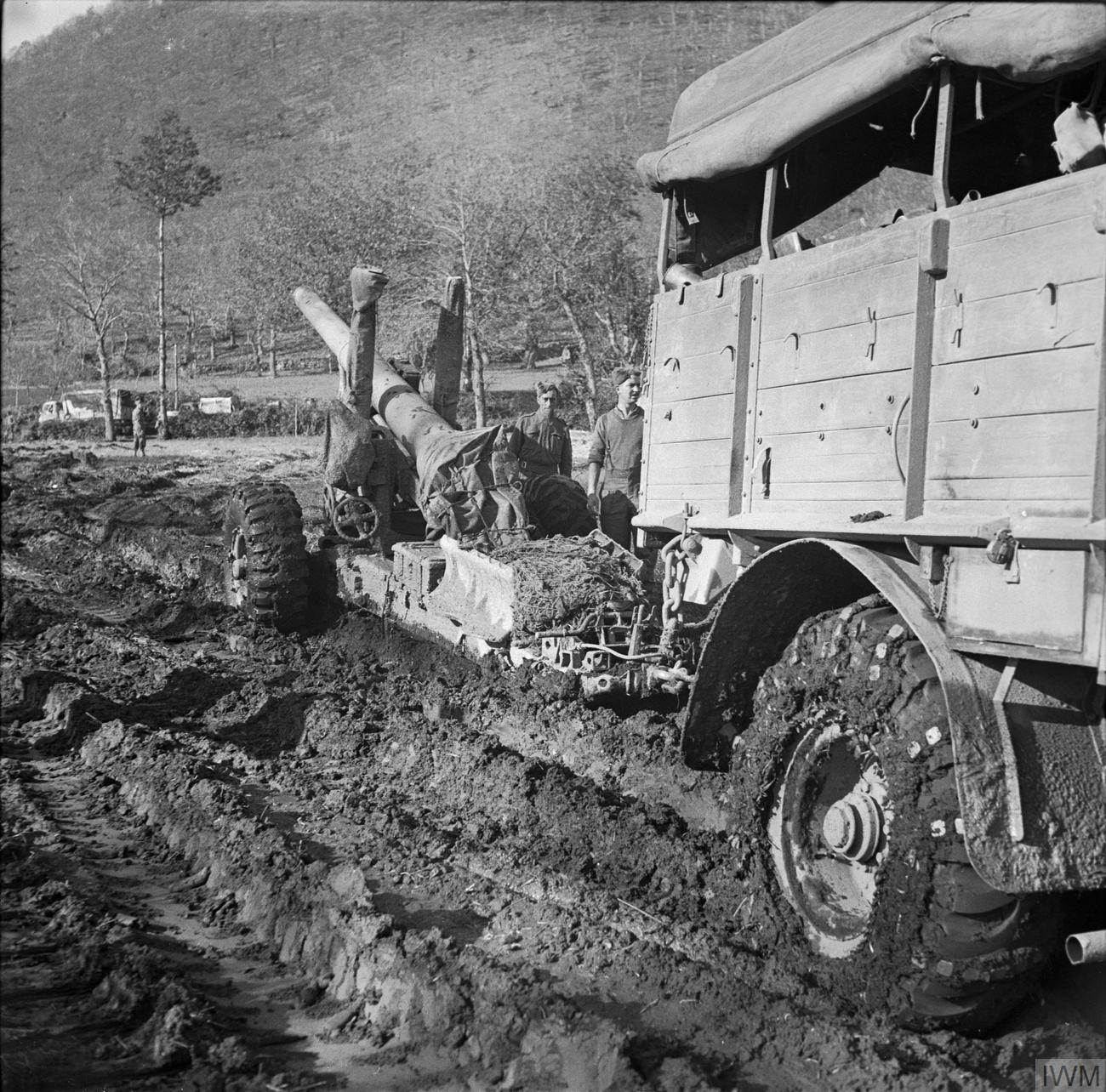
99 Battery of 74th Medium Regiment struggles to bring a 5.5-inch gun into action during the winter fighting at Monte Camino.

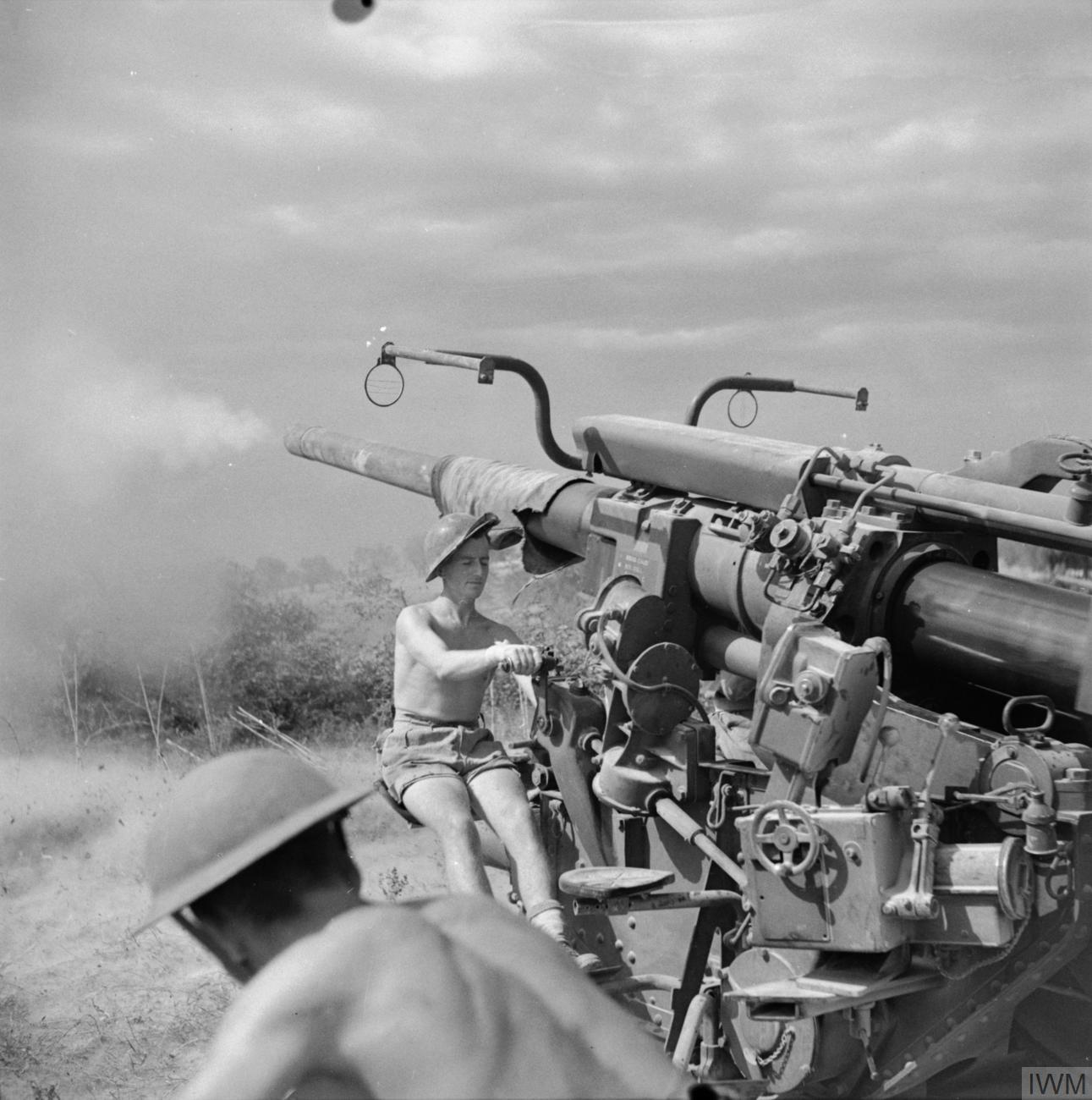
A 3.7-inch HAA gun firing in the ground support role in Italy.

The make-up of an AGRA during the Italian Campaign was extremely flexible: it could include army field regiments (25-pounders), medium regiments (4.5-inch or 5.5-inch guns) and heavy regiments (7.2-inch howitzers). It might also be augmented with 3.7-inch heavy anti-aircraft (HAA) guns loaned by the AA brigades for additional ground support fire. 2nd AGRA landed at Salerno in Italy with X Corps soon after the assault landings (Operation Avalanche) on 9 September 1943. 12th AA Brigade was responsible for the AA defence of the beachhead, and its HAA guns had also been firing in support of the infantry divisions during the first few days before 2nd AGRA arrived. When the break-out from the beachhead got under way on 18 September, 12th AA Bde provided a Light AA battery to protect 2nd AGRA's medium gun areas around Mango. 2nd AGRA then supported X Corps in its advance to Naples and the crossing of the River Volturno. In the advance beyond the Voluturno, it was reinforced by 214 (Southsea) Battery from 57th (Wessex) HAA Regiment, to fire in the medium role and the followed the advance in the HAA role.

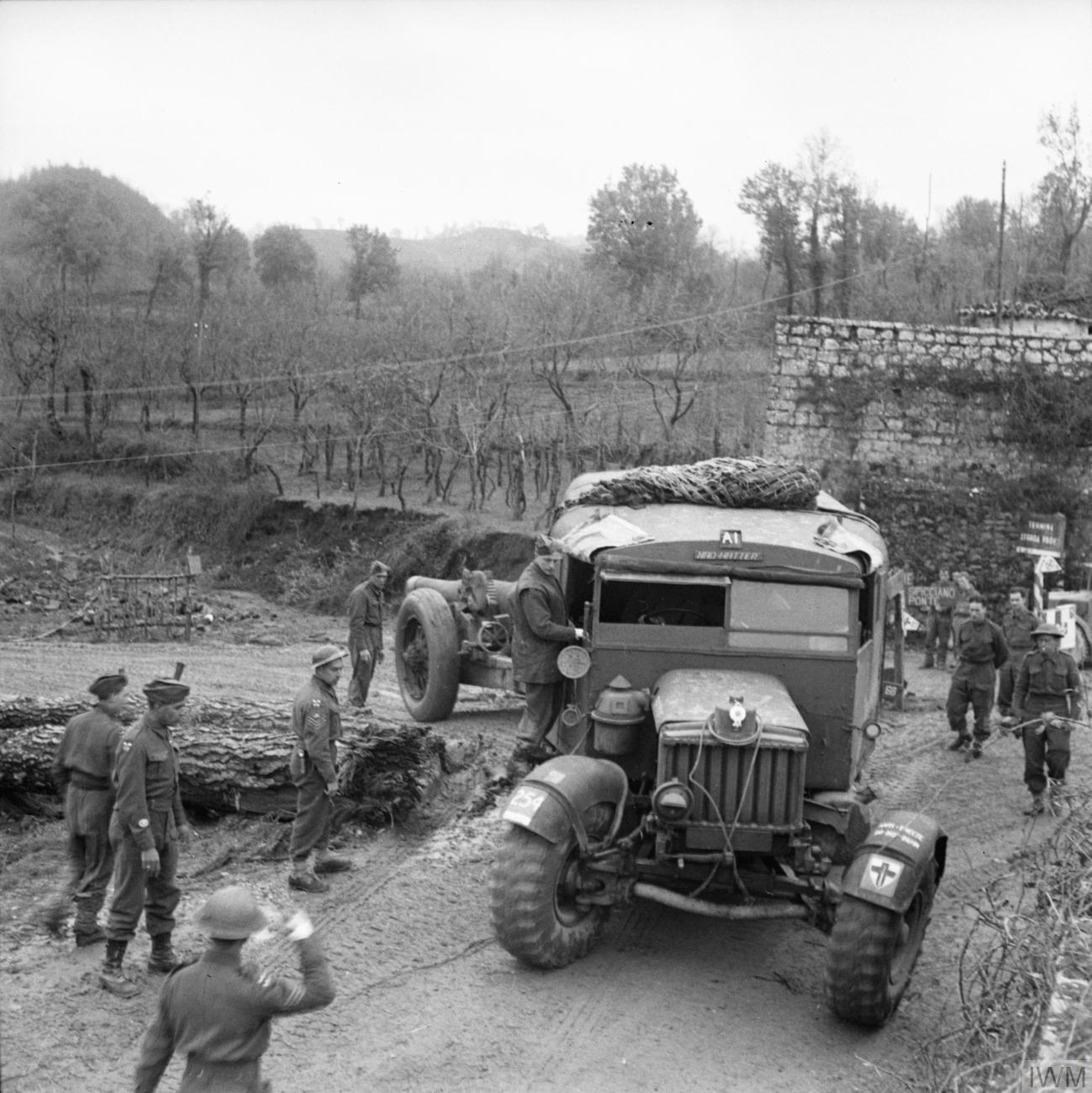
Scammell Pioneer tractor towing a 7.2-inch howitzer of 56th Heavy Regiment round a tight corner in Italy, 23 December 1943.

The utility of the 3.7-inch gun for medium artillery work, and the declining threat from the Luftwaffe, meant that HAA units were increasingly used in the ground fire role. Despite the confusion in titles, 2nd AA Brigade actually operated as '2nd AGRA (AA)' in the later stages of the campaign.

In December 1943, 2nd AGRA fired in support of 201st Guards Brigade's attack up 'Bare Arse Ridge' on 6 November during the Battle of Monte Camino, with the following line-up of guns:

- 23rd Field Regiment
- 146th (Pembroke & Cardiganshire) Field Regiment
- 74th Medium Regiment
- 56th Heavy Regiment

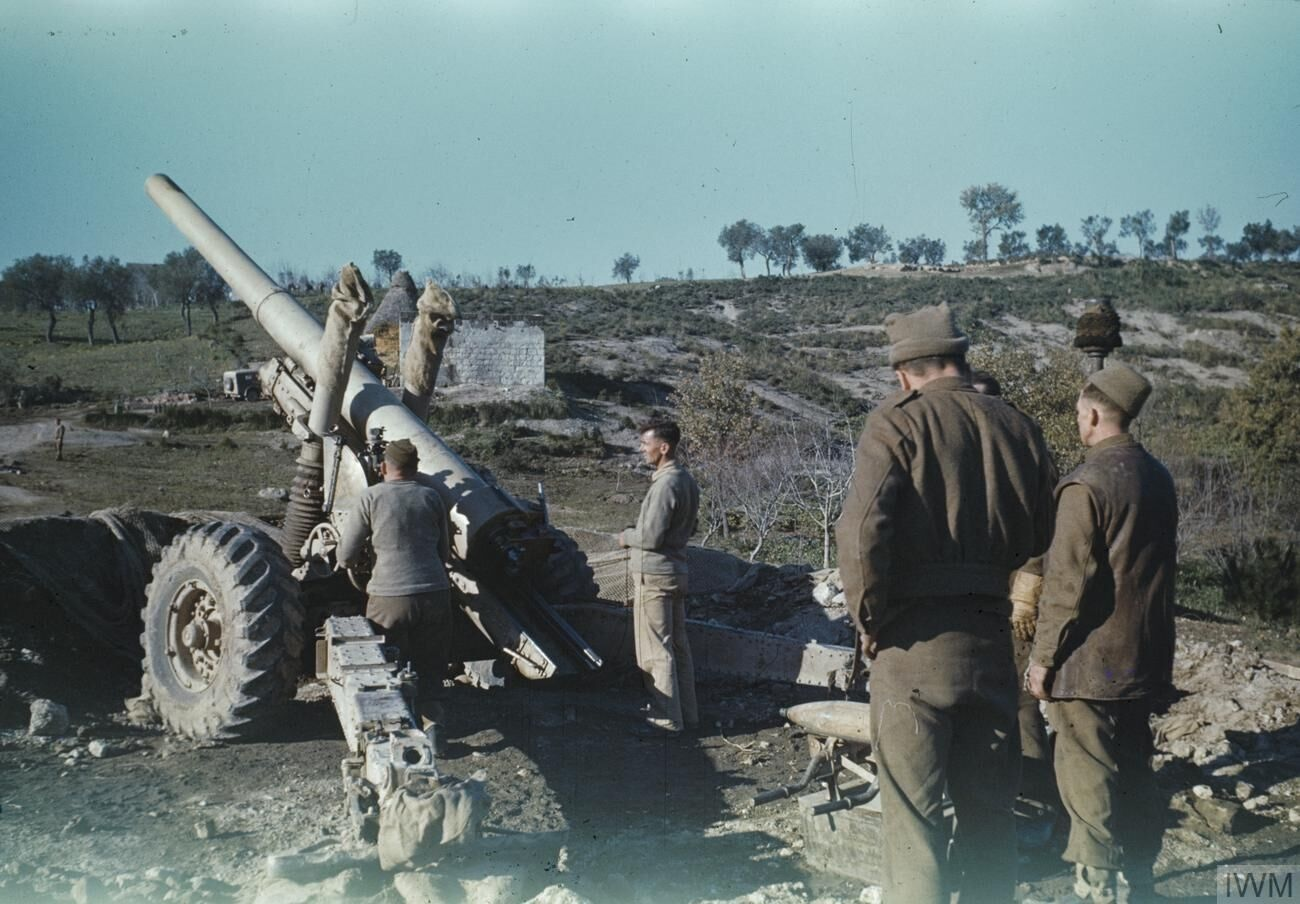
A 5.5-inch crew awaiting the order to fire on the Garigliano, January 1944.

It supported 56th (London) Infantry Division of X Corps during the assault crossing of the Garigliano in January 1944, with the following units:

- 78th (Lowland) Field Regiment
- 69th (Caernarvon & Denbigh Yeomanry) Medium Regiment
- 74th Medium Regiment
- 140th (5th London) Medium Regiment
- 56th Heavy Regiment

In February 1944, 2nd AGRA was sent with three field and five medium regiments to support the New Zealand Corps in operations against Monte Cassino. By late May, 2nd AGRA was supporting X Corps' advance after Operation Diadem had broken through the German Winter Line, and in the subsequent pursuit to Lake Trasimeno and advance to Florence, with the following order of battle:

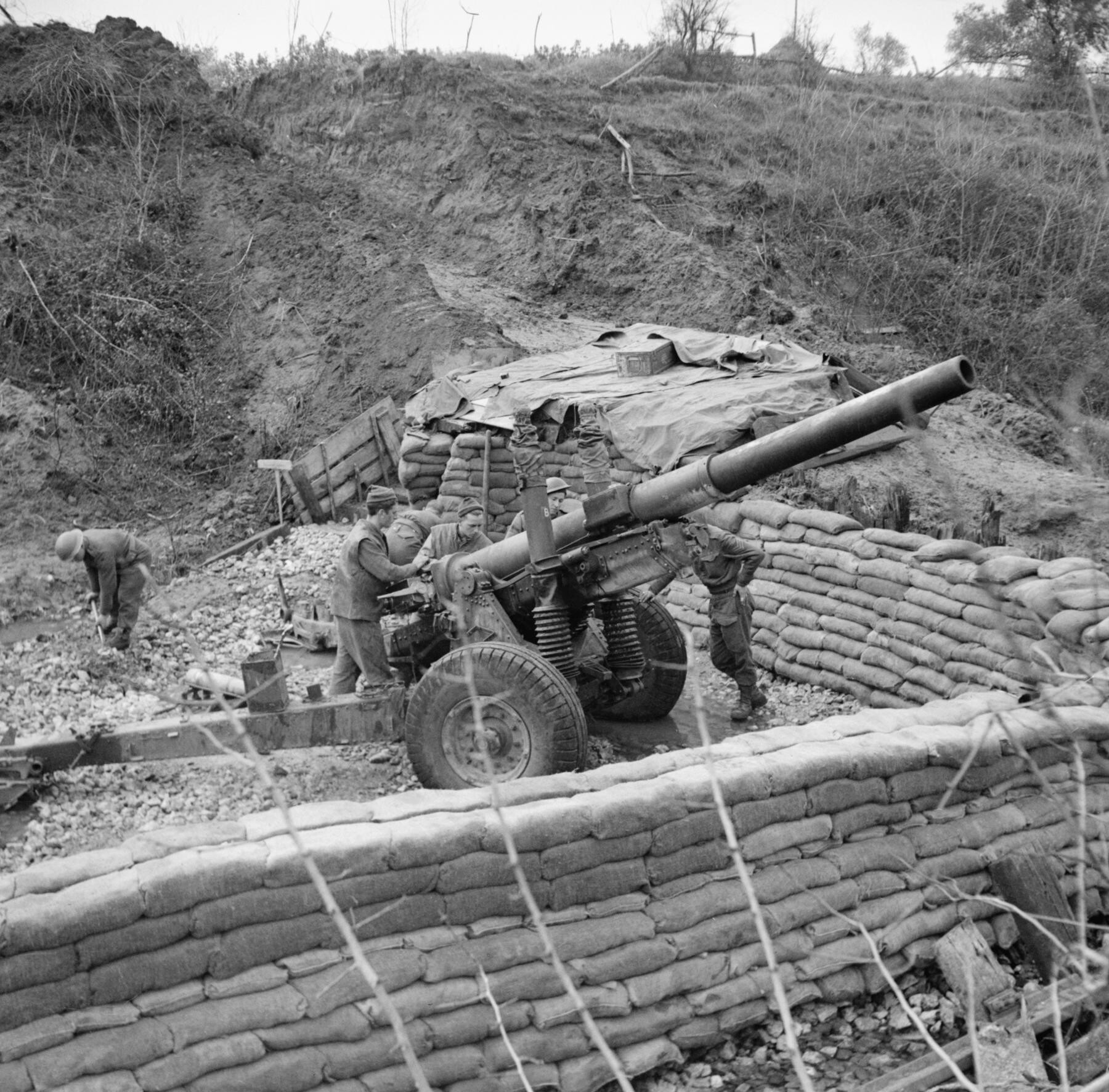
5.5-inch gun of 102nd (Pembroke Yeomanry) Medium Regiment, March 1944.

- 5th Medium Regiment
- 74th Medium Regiment
- 102nd (Pembroke Yeomanry) Medium Regiment
- 140th (5th London) Medium Regiment
- 56th Heavy Regiment
- One battery, 32nd Heavy Regiment

It continued with X Corps during Operation Olive to breach the Gothic Line in August, and was with II Polish Corps in October. For the Allied Spring 1945 offensive in Italy (Operation Grapeshot), 2nd AGRA supported V Corps with five medium regiments (56th Heavy Rgt having been transferred to 21st Army Group in Belgium by that stage.)

At the end of the war, HQ 2nd AGRA appears to have been redesignated HQ 180th Infantry Brigade in the Central Mediterranean Force.

== Postwar ==
An abortive attempt to reform 2nd AGRA in the Canal Zone of Middle East Command was made on 9 December 1954 and abandoned on 1 February 1955.

A new HQ, 'Y' AGRA (AA), began forming at Warrington on 21 March 1955 to command anti-aircraft (AA) units of the Territorial Army (TA) in North West England. It was designated 2 AGRA (AA) by 15 July, and had the following composition:

- 314th Heavy Anti-Aircraft Regiment, Royal Artillery
- 436th (South Lancashire Artillery) Light Anti-Aircraft Regiment, Royal Artillery
- 441st Light Anti-Aircraft/Searchlight Regiment, Royal Artillery
- 470th (3rd West Lancashire) Light Anti-Aircraft Regiment, Royal Artillery

Anti-Aircraft Command had been disbanded on 10 March 1955 and all these regiments were the result of multiple mergers of pre-existing TA regiments.

2 AGRA (AA) was placed in suspended animation on 1 April 1959 (on the same day that a new 40 AGRA (AA) (TA) was formed at Warrington) and disbanded on 1 January 1962.

== See also ==
- 1st Army Group Royal Artillery
- 6th Army Group Royal Artillery – British Army unit
- 8th Army Group Royal Artillery
- 9th Army Group Royal Artillery

== External sources ==
- British Army units from 1945 on
- British & Commonwealth Badge Forum
- Royal Artillery 1939–1945
