= 140th (5th London) Field Regiment, Royal Artillery =

British Territorial Army unit in World War II

140th (5th London) Field Regiment, RA 140th (5th London) Medium Regiment, RA
- Royal Artillery cap badge
- Active: 1 May 1939 – 1 February 1945
- Country: United Kingdom
- Branch: Territorial Army
- Role: Field artillery
- Size: Regiment
- Part of: British Expeditionary Force; First Army; Eighth Army
- Garrison/HQ: Clapham Common
- Engagements: Defence of Cassel; Dunkirk Evacuation; Tunisian Campaign; Italian Campaign

The 140th (5th London) Field Regiment, Royal Artillery was a unit of Britain's Territorial Army formed in 1939, just before World War II. During the Battle of France, in 1940, it participated in defending Cassel to protect the British Expeditionary Force's evacuation from Dunkirk. Barely half the men escaped to England, where the regiment was rebuilt. It later served in home defence, in Tunisia, and after conversion to the medium artillery role, in Italy, where it was disbanded.

== Organisation ==
After the Munich Crisis of 1938, the part-time Territorial Army (TA) was rapidly doubled in size. On 1 May 1939, the 92nd (5th London) Field Regiment, Royal Artillery created a duplicate 140th Field Regiment, RA by separating the 366 (10th London) Battery at Kennington Lane, Lambeth, and the 367 (11th London) Battery at Woolwich. The new Regimental Headquarters (RHQ) was established at 63 Southside, Clapham Common. It was officially given the "5th London" subtitle in 1942. The 92nd and 140th Field Regiments were both unattached units in London District.

=== Equipment ===
The British Army in 1939 (unlike the German Army) was fully motorized in consequence of a mechanization initiative. At the time, field regiments were organised as an RHQ and two batteries, each of 12 guns. These were 18-pounder guns of World War I pattern, towed behind tractor units (mainly Morris or Guy "Quads") with an ammunition limber positioned between tractor and gun. The 18-pounder was a quick-firing field gun with the shell and cartridge fixed together. It was based on a World War One weapon that had been modernised, and was mounted on a Mark II carriage with rubber tyres. The gun barrel was nickel-steel with a single-motion screw breech incorporating a cartridge extractor. The sights were on the right of the gun and incorporated a telescope and clinometer for indirect firing in an arc. The maximum effective range of the weapon was normally 3–5 miles (4.8–8.0 km), although in the last days of the Battle of Cassel some of the firing was done over "open sights" directly at German tanks only a few yards distant.

In 1939–40, British field artillery tactics were organised to provide groups of gun strong points, usually camouflaged by trees, supported by communication tracks to supplies and ammunition at the rear, and with forward observation posts linked by telegraph wires. In 1939–40, a battery was sub-divided into three troops, each troop with four guns and shared radio communications. Each gun would have been crewed by six men: a sergeant in overall charge, a No. 3 who was his right hand man, a lance bombardier who laid and fired the gun, numbers 2 and 4 who loaded and rammed the shells, and numbers 5 and 6 who fetched and carried the ammunition.

140th Field Regiment’s vehicles were identified by a number "10" in white on a red and blue background.

Regimental officers – March 1940
The following Officers were recorded as members of 140th Regiment Royal Artillery in March 1940: Lt-Col C.J. Odling, TD; Maj N.Christopherson; Maj H.R. Graham Brooks, MC; Maj E. Milton; Capt T.G. Greenwood; Capt H. Wesley; Capt C. L. MacDougall; Capt C.A. Hood (Adjutant); 2nd Lt/Acting Capt F.H. Sirkett; Lt L.S. Muir; Lt R. Baxter; Lt J. May; Lt E.F. Jeffrey; Lt Quartermaster F.G. Bower, MC; 2nd Lt M. Roland; 2nd Lt D.W. Clarke; 2nd Lt C.T. Hackett; 2nd Lt D.V. Mackay; 2nd Lt G.E. Booth; 2nd Lt B.J. Strachan; 2nd Lt R. Crichton-Brown; 2nd Lt J.H. Leaman; 2nd Lt H.A.A. Baird; 2nd Lt G. Cook; 2nd Lt R.J. Hawes; 2nd Lt R.J. Fitch; 2nd Lt D. Budd; 2nd Lt G.L. Somerwill; 2nd Lt C.J. Bennett; Attached: Chaplain A. Beale Royal Army Chaplains' Department; Lt D.W. Lacey, Royal Army Medical Corps; Lt F.G.D. Dwight, Royal Army Ordnance Corps, OME; Lt N. Layton, Royal Corps of Signals; Georges Kemir (French Army Agent de Liaison)

== Battle of France ==
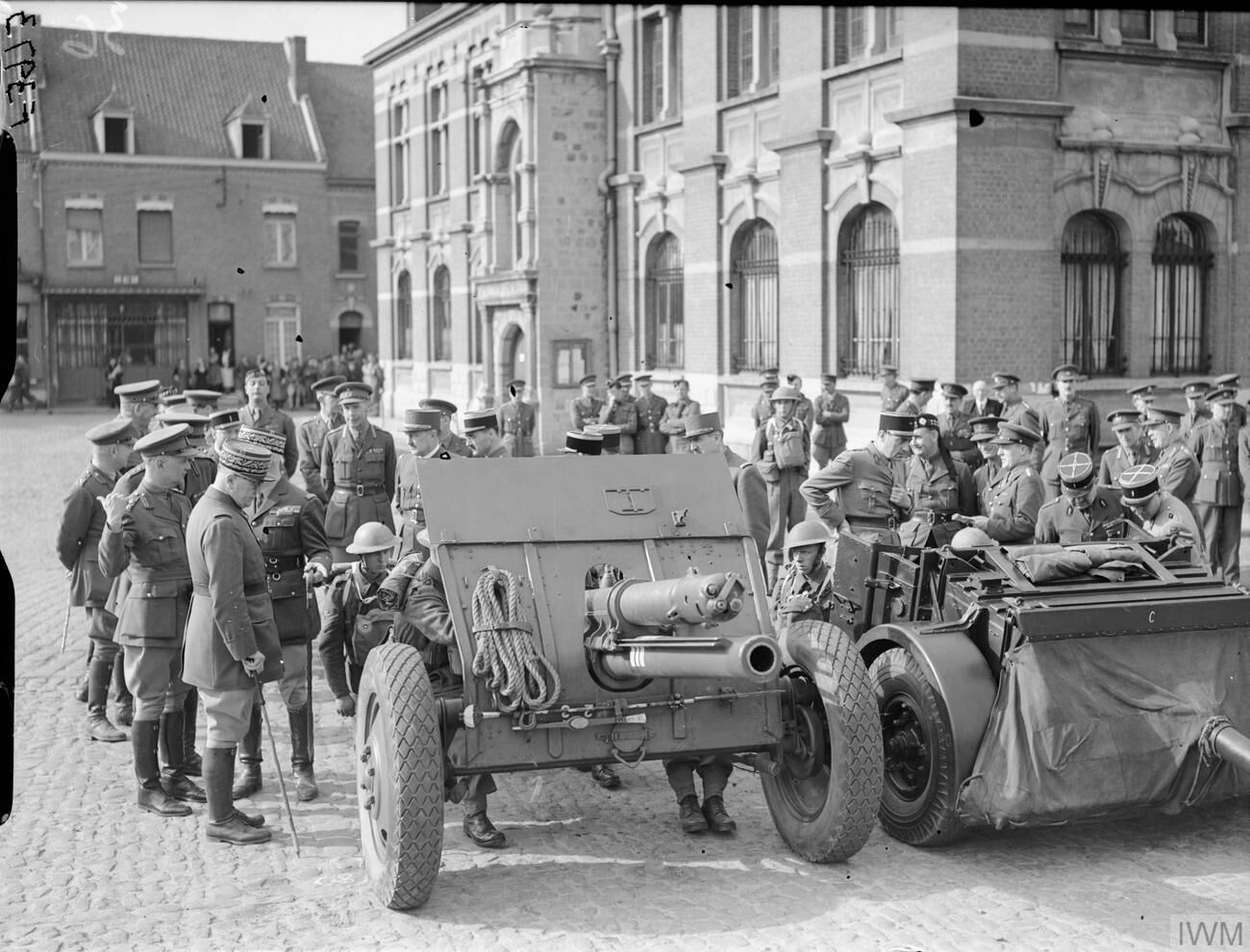
18-Pounder gun being inspected in France, April 1940.

At the outbreak of war in September 1939, the 140th Field Regiment mobilised under the command of Lieutenant-Colonel Cedric Odling. In November 1939, after the soldiers had been equipped and had finished basic training in London, and Dursley, Gloucestershire, the regiment was assigned to join the British Expeditionary Force as "Army Troops", not assigned to a particular formation. On 2 March 1940, the regiment left Dursley and landed at Le Havre, in France, on 6 March 1940. By 9 May 1940, the regiment had been assigned to I Corps.

Following the German invasion of the Low Countries on 10 May, the BEF advanced north into Belgium to defend the line of the Dyle river under Plan D. The regiment allegedly fired the first British artillery round during the Dyle-line defence. But the German Army broke through the Ardennes to the east, forcing the BEF to withdraw to the line of the Escaut river.

On the evening of 16 May 1940, the regiment withdrew—via Brussels, Ninove, and Tournai—to the Escaut line, as the French military situation worsened to the south. The policy was to "superimpose" army field artillery regiments onto divisional artillery to give enhanced firepower as required. During the fighting on the Escaut, the regiment was in action with 42nd (East Lancashire) Infantry Division at Wannehain, where it suffered its first battle casualties and had three guns knocked out by enemy shellfire.

On 22 May 1940, the regiment withdrew across the Franco-Belgian border into the French village of Sainguin-en-Melantois. The two batteries operated together as a single fighting unit until 23 May 1940. After then, as the British and French military situation worsened further, they were separated and were assigned to different sectors.

366 Battery, under the command of Major Brooks, was assigned to defend the eastern escape corridor to Dunkirk and followed a route—via Seclin and Lille—to the Messines ridge in support of the British defence of the Ypres-Commines line. The battery was positioned near the village of Wytschaete during 27–28 May 1940, then withdrew under cover of darkness on 28 May 1940, having disabled its guns, and successfully reached the Dunkirk beaches on 29 May 1940.

367 Battery, together with RHQ, under the command of Colonel C.J. Odling, was assigned to protect the western corridor and was initially assigned to "MacForce" under the command of Lieutenant-General Noel Mason-MacFarlane, on 23 May 1940, before joining "Somerforce" at the French hilltop town of Cassel under the command of Brigadier Nigel Fitzroy Somerset, on 25 May 1940. Somerforce included units of Brigadier Somerset's own 145th Infantry Brigade (2nd Battalion Gloucestershire Regiment, 4th Battalion Oxfordshire and Buckinghamshire Light Infantry), together with armoured cars of the East Riding Yeomanry, and various support units, including the 140th Field Regiment and 5th Regiment, Royal Horse Artillery. Its role was to hold the line from Cassel to Hazebrouck at the outer perimeter of the Dunkirk pocket.

=== Last stand at Cassel ===
During four days, 25–29 May, Cassel was effectively converted into a tank-proof fortress with a series of surrounding "picket" villages—including the bunker at Le Peckel, Bavinchove, and Zuytpeene—which were all doggedly defended. By 27 May, Cassel was surrounded and there was heavy fighting around the hilltop town, with 140 Field Regiment's 18-pdrs "doing great execution". On 29 May, the enemy closed in with tanks: five of these were knocked out before the remainder forced their way into the town, and German infantry attacked troop command posts until they were driven out by the gunners. The regiment adopted a position of all-round defence. Finally, a military policeman on a motorcycle got through the surrounding enemy to deliver a day-old order for Somerforce to withdraw. Lieutenant-Colonel Howard ordered his men to hold out until nightfall and then destroy all equipment and make their escape. The regiment destroyed its guns and set off in the dark in a north-easterly direction towards Dunkirk, intending to join the evacuation (Operation Dynamo). A large number were captured during the day of 30 May 1940, on the Franco-Belgian border near the town of Watou. Although many of the men of 366 Battery were successfully evacuated, very few of 367 Battery escaped capture and most of the survivors of Cassel spent the remainder of the war as prisoners of war (POWs).

== Home Defence ==
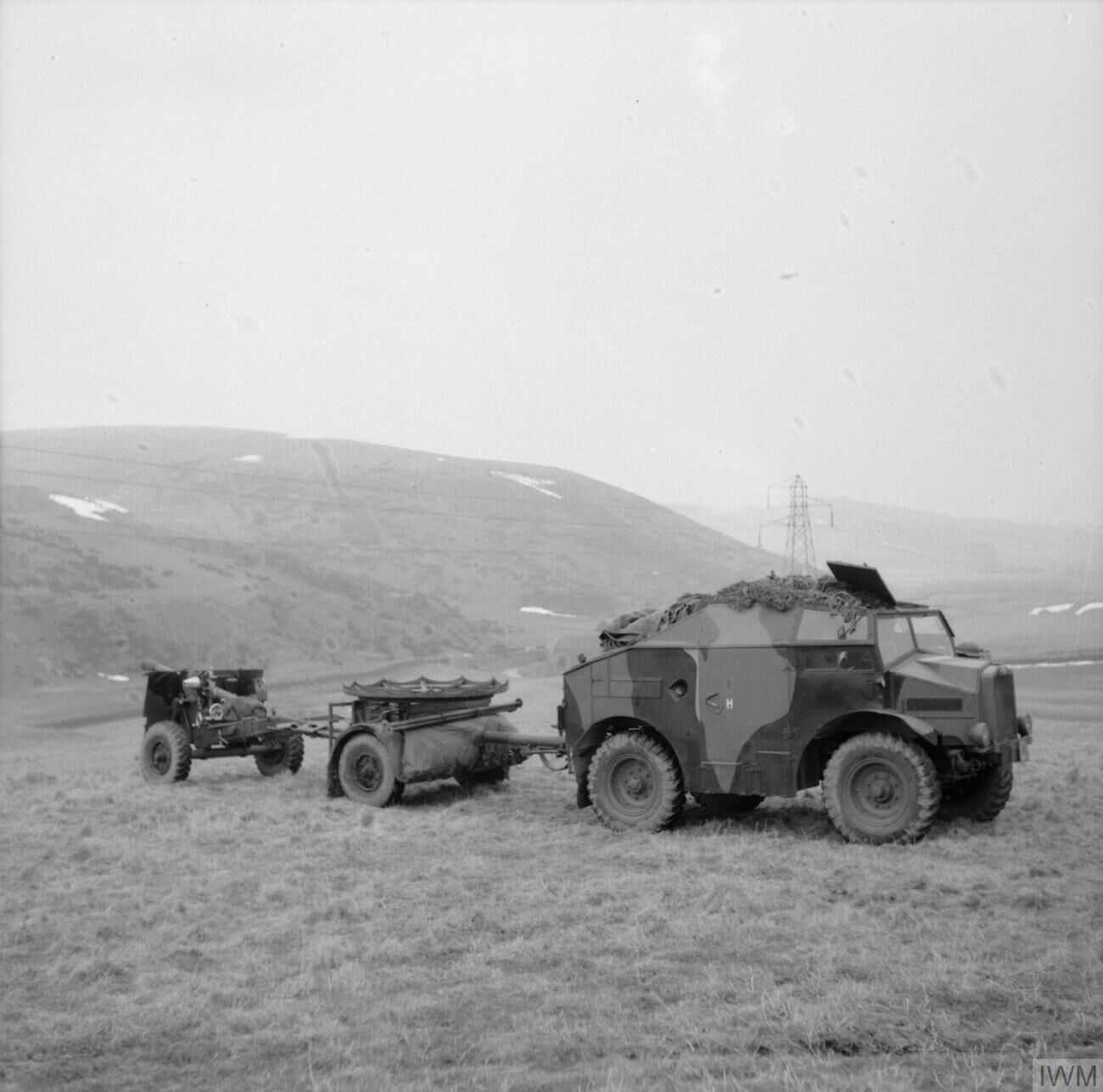
25-Pounder gun and Morris C8 Quad on exercise in 1941

Fourteen officers and 287 men (out of an establishment of 580) returned from Dunkirk to reform the regiment. After Dunkirk, the priority was the defence of the United Kingdom from the expected invasion; and so there was urgent pressure for the 140th Field Regiment to reform. In mid-June 1940, the men were concentrated away from the invasion front line at Worksop, in Nottinghamshire. They moved to Salford on 28 June 1940, and to Castor, Peterborough, in October 1940, where they were re-equipped. They were equipped with 25-pounder field guns when these became available.

In December, still as an "Army Field Regiment", the regiment was a part of Southern Command, awaiting the arrival of its signal section. It was only by late 1940 that the royal artillery could supply enough personnel to begin the process of changing regiments from two-battery to three-battery organisations. (Three 8-gun batteries were easier to handle, and it meant that each infantry battalion in a brigade could be closely associated with a battery.) On 25 January 1941, while the regiment was at Bournemouth, its third battery was formed; at first, the three batteries were designated P, Q, and R, but reverted to numerical designations: 366, 367, and 504. By March it had been assigned to V Corps, as part of the field army. In May, 366 Fd Bty was attached to the War Office Reserve; and on 4 June it left for service in Iceland as an independent battery.

366 Battery was replaced on 4 September when 518 Fd Bty was formed at Bradford Down Camp, Dorchester, Dorset, and joined the regiment, which now had its signal section. On 17 February 1942, the regiment's "5th London" subtitle was authorised; and by April it had its attached Light Aid Detachment of the Royal Electrical and Mechanical Engineers and 1502 Field Regiment Platoon of the Royal Army Service Corps, for transport. During the year the regiment was equipped with the Bishop Self-Propelled Gun, a 25-pounder gun mounted on an adapted Valentine tank chassis.

== North Africa ==
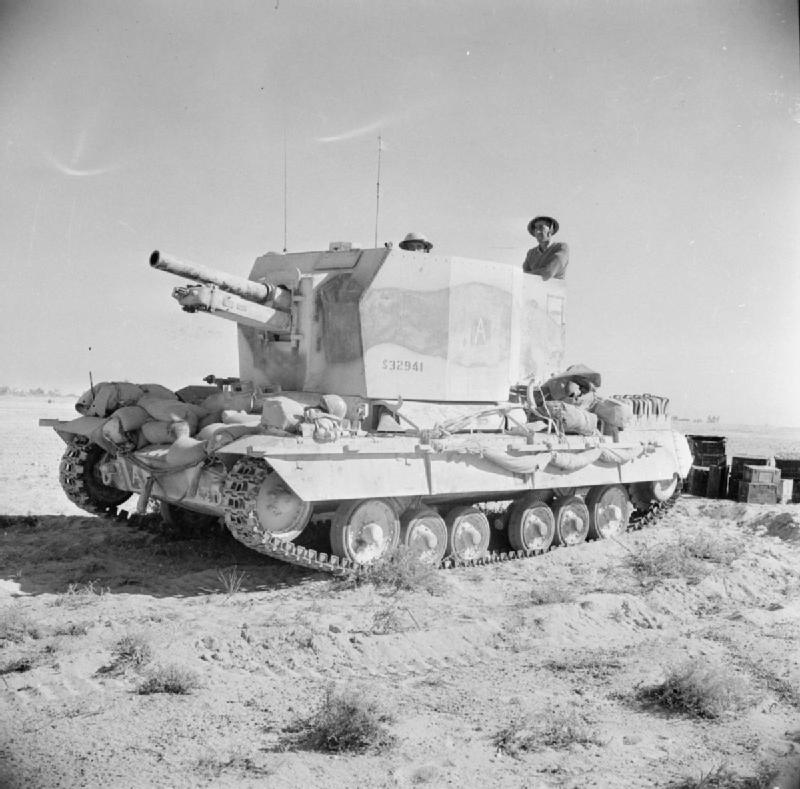
Bishop SP 25-pounder in North Africa.

V Corps was assigned to the Allied landings in North Africa (Operation Torch) as part of First Army, and 140th Field Regiment came directly under the command of First Army when the latter was formed in the summer. The landings began on 8 November, and the force built up thereafter. 140th Field Regiment went to Algeria in January 1943 as part of 2nd Army Group Royal Artillery (AGRA). It served in the latter part of the campaign, which ended with the capture of Tunis in May 1943.

== 140th (5th London) Medium Regiment ==
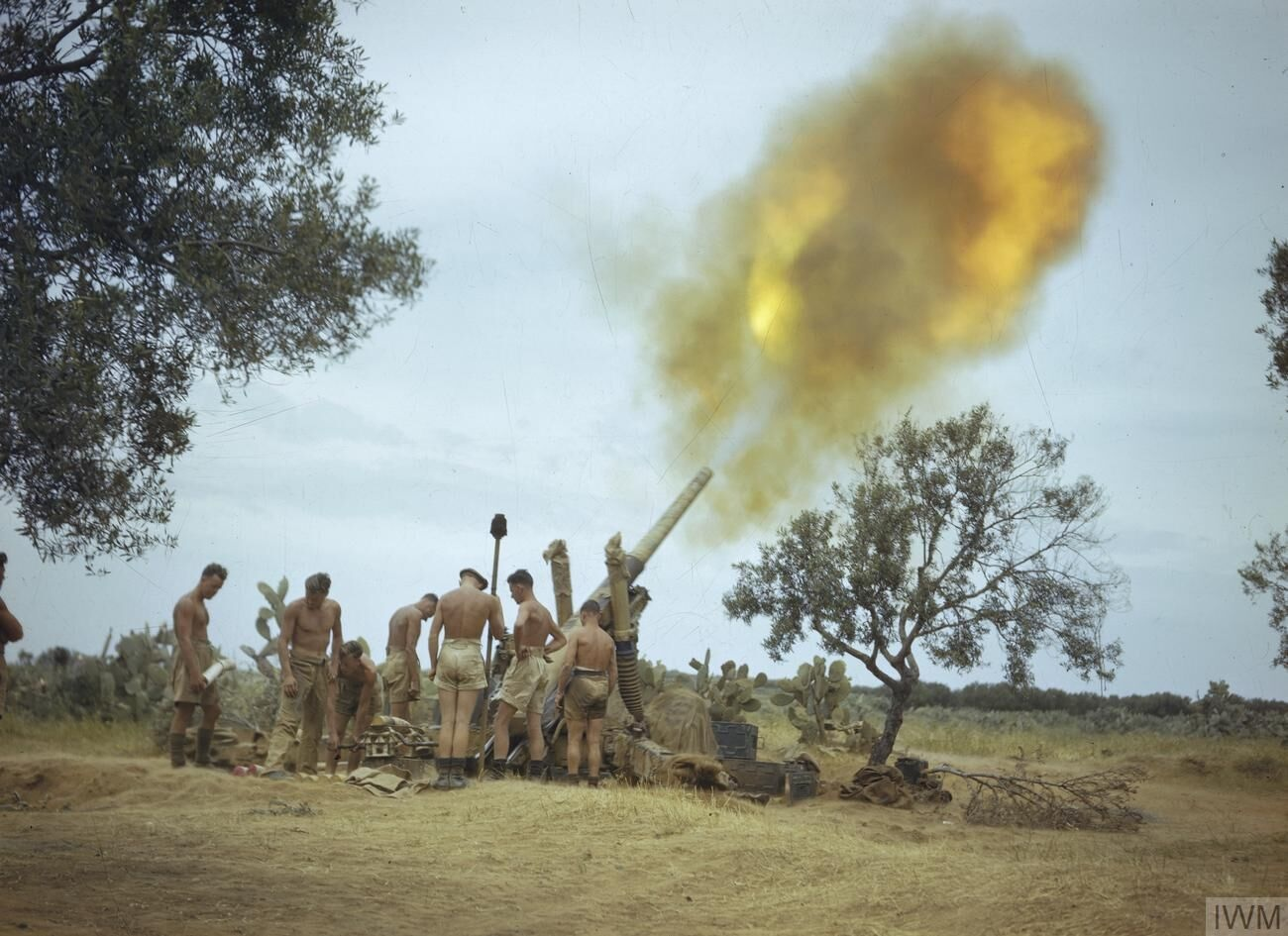
A British 4.5-inch gun firing in Tunisia, 1943.

The regiment was not used in the Allied invasion of Sicily. On 23 September 1943, it was converted to the medium artillery role as the 140th (5th London) Medium Regiment comprising the 367 and 518 Medium Batteries, while 504 Battery was converted to the heavy role and joined the 75th (Highland) Heavy Regiment. For its new role, the 140th Medium Regiment was equipped with 4.5-inch guns. The regiment landed in Italy before the end of September and joined Eighth Army fighting in the Italian Campaign. It took part in most of the battles of the campaign. It was part of 2nd Army Group Royal Artillery (AGRA) at the crossing of the Garigliano in January 1944, prior to its involvement in the Battle of Monte Cassino, and in May supported II Polish Corps in the final assaults on Monte Cassino.

== Disbandment ==
By the end of 1944, Eighth Army was suffering a severe manpower shortage, and the only way to keep infantry and field artillery units up to strength was to redeploy men from surplus anti-aircraft and medium artillery units. The 140th (5th London) Medium Regiment was placed in suspended animation on 1 February 1945, and its personnel drafted to other units. The regiment was not reformed when the Territorial Army was reconstituted on 1 January 1947.

== Legacy ==
=== Grand Party ===
A book written by Lt-Col Brooks in 1941, entitled Grand Party, records 366 Battery's involvement in the 1940 campaign, including the Dunkirk evacuation.

=== Captivity and the Long March 1940-45 ===
Many of the regular soldiers of the 140th Regiment captured at Dunkirk were sent to Stalag VIII-B in Silesia as POWs. An account of POW life and the forced Long March that took place to escape the Russian advance into Germany in 1945 was written by Private Norman Gibbs.

=== Gunner Eric West, 367 Battery ===
The story of the 140th Field Regiment's involvement with the BEF in 1940 has been published and focuses on the story of Gunner Eric West, including his experience of captivity in Stalag VIII-B POW camp and subsequent Long March.

=== In Dunkirk's Grim Days ===
In 1948, Brigadier Nigel Somerset was spurred by his feeling that the brave defence of Cassel by his Somerforce was being neglected by historians of the period. He wrote a letter to the Daily Telegraph on 19 February 1948, titled "In Dunkirk's Grim Days":

Sir – I notice that in his memoirs of 1940 Mr. Churchill observes that 'After the loss of Boulogne and Calais only the remains of the port of Dunkirk and the open beaches next to the Belgian frontier were in our hands.'

At the time I was commanding a brigade group holding a sector from Cassel to Hazebrouck. We were heavily attacked by German armour on May 27. At Cassel, the Germans were repulsed with the loss of over 20 tanks. At Hazebrouk our force there was surrounded and did not finally capitulate until the evening of May 28.

Not knowing that the BEF was embarking for the United Kingdom we hourly expected a vigorous counter-attack by British and possibly French troops to restore the situation. We hung on at Cassel until the night of May 29 and then tried to reach the Dunkirk bridgehead. German operation maps at the time showed Cassel and district still occupied by the enemy, and leaflets were dropped calling on us to surrender, as 'your generals are gone!'

I feel it is fair neither to myself nor the troops under my command to let this stand pass from mind, especially as so many gave their lives, and most of the remainder of us spent five years in captivity. Incidentally, by holding on at Cassel we not only deprived the Germans of one of the main roads to Dunkirk, but enabled many British detached units and individuals to reach the bridgehead.

All these facts appear to have utterly escaped the notice of the authorities at the time owing to the indescribable confusion, and I feel that an opportunity has now been afforded me of bringing them to light.

Yours faithfully, N. F. SOMERSET
