= 102nd (Pembroke and Cardiganshire) Field Regiment, Royal Artillery =

102nd (Pembroke & Cardigan) Brigade, RFA 102nd (Pembroke & Cardiganshire) Field Regiment, RA 102nd (Pembroke Yeomanry) Medium Regiment, RA
- Royal Artillery cap badge
- Active: 3 September 1920 – 15 January 1946
- Country: United Kingdom
- Branch: Territorial Army
- Type: Yeomanry
- Role: Field artillery/Medium Artillery
- Size: 2–4 Batteries
- Part of: 38th (Welsh) Infantry Division; First Army; 2nd Army Group Royal Artillery
- Engagements: Battle of Hunt's Gap; Battle of Monte Cassino; Operation Olive; Operation Grapeshot

The 102nd (Pembroke and Cardiganshire) Field Regiment, Royal Artillery, was a Welsh unit of Britain's part-time Territorial Army (TA) formed after World War I from an existing Yeomanry Cavalry regiment. It fought in the Tunisian campaign and was then converted to medium artillery, in which role it fought through the Italian campaign, including the Battles of Monte Cassino, the Gothic Line, and the final Spring 1945 offensive. The regiment continued in the postwar TA, and a successor unit continues in today's Army Reserve.

== Origin ==
The Pembroke Yeomanry was a cavalry unit of Britain's part-time Territorial Force (TF), which had served in World War I. After the TF was reconstituted on 7 February 1920 only the 14 most senior Yeomanry regiments remained horsed, the others being re-roled, generally in the Royal Field Artillery (RFA). The Pembroke Yeomanry (ranked 17th) was converted on 3 September 1920 into 102nd (Pembroke and Cardigan) Brigade, RFA (Note: In contemporary RA usage a brigade was a lieutenant-colonel's command consisting of batteries 'brigaded' together; it was not comparable with an infantry or cavalry brigade commanded by a brigadier-general. In the Territorials, unlike the Regulars, unit heritage is carried by the brigade/regiment, rather than the battery.) with the following organisation:

- Brigade HQ at Greenhill Avenue, Tenby
- 405 (Pembroke) Battery at Bush Camp, Pembroke Dock
- 406 (Pembroke) Battery (Howitzer) at Haverfordwest
- 407 (Cardigan) Battery at Cardigan (Note: The Cardiganshire Battery of 2nd Welsh Brigade, RFA, at Aberystwyth was not reformed in 1920, and there was no direct link between that unit and the new Cardigan batteries.)
- 408 (Cardigan) Battery at Aberystwyth

In 1924 the RFA was subsumed into the Royal Artillery (RA), and the word 'Field' was inserted into the titles of its brigades and batteries. The 102nd was defined as an 'Army Field Brigade' serving as 'Army Troops' in 53rd (Welsh) Divisional Area and The brigade was defined as 'Army Troops' in 53rd (Welsh) Divisional Area and 53rd (Welsh) Divisional Signals also included 231st Field Artillery Signal Section, Royal Corps of Signals, to service the brigade. The establishment of a TA artillery brigade was four 6-gun batteries, three equipped with 18-pounder guns and one with 4.5-inch howitzers, all of World War I patterns. However, the batteries only held four guns in peacetime. The guns and their first-line ammunition wagons were still horsedrawn and the battery staffs were mounted. Partial mechanisation was carried out from 1927, but the guns retained iron-tyred wheels until pneumatic tyres began to be introduced just before World War II.

By 1930 the HQ of 102nd (Pembroke & Cardigan) Army Brigade had moved to Carmarthen Barracks, and by December 1934 it was at Haverfordwest. In 1931 the Pembroke batteries changed their subtitles to 'Pembroke Yeomanry' and in 1937 'Cardigan' in the brigade and battery titles was altered to 'Cardiganshire'.

In 1938 the RA modernised its nomenclature and a lieutenant-colonel's command was designated a 'regiment' rather than a 'brigade'; this applied to TA field brigades from 1 November 1938. The TA was doubled in size after the Munich Crisis, and most regiments formed duplicates. Part of the reorganisation was that field regiments changed from four six-gun batteries to an establishment of two batteries, each of three four-gun troops. For the Pembroke & Cardigan regiment this resulted in the following organisation from 8 July 1939:

102nd (Pembroke & Cardiganshire) Field Regiment

- Regimental HQ at Pembroke Dock
- 405 (Pembroke Yeomanry) Field Battery at Pembroke Dock
- 406 (Pembroke Yeomanry) Field Battery at Haverfordwest

146th Field Regiment

- RHQ at Aberystwyth
- 407 (Cardiganshire) Field Battery at Aberystwyth
- 408 (Cardiganshire) Field Battery at Cardigan

== World War II ==
=== Mobilisation and Home Defence ===
38th (Welsh) Division's formation sign.

When the TA was mobilised on 1 September, just ahead of the outbreak of World War II on 3 September, both regiments were assigned to 38th (Welsh) Infantry Division, the duplicate of 53rd (Welsh) Division that was being formed in Western Command. This new division became operational on 18 September 1939.

Until 14 July 1940 the division was undergoing training in south-east Wales in Western Command. Then, after the British Expeditionary Force's evacuation from Dunkirk, III Corps HQ took over field command in Western Command, and 38th (W) Division was stationed around Liverpool. On 16 April 1941 the division moved to IV Corps defending invasion-threatened Sussex. 38th (W) Division was in corps reserve, behind the divisions guarding the coast.

One of the lessons learned from the Battle of France was that the two-battery organisation did not work: field regiments were intended to support an infantry brigade of three battalions. As a result, they were reorganised into three 8-gun batteries, but it was not until late 1940 that the RA had enough trained battery staffs to carry out the reorganisation. 102nd (P&C) Field Rgt accordingly formed 473 Fd Bty on 24 March 1941 when the regiment was stationed at Ascot, Berkshire. By now RA field regiments had standardised on the modern 25-pounder gun in place of the prewar 18-pdr.

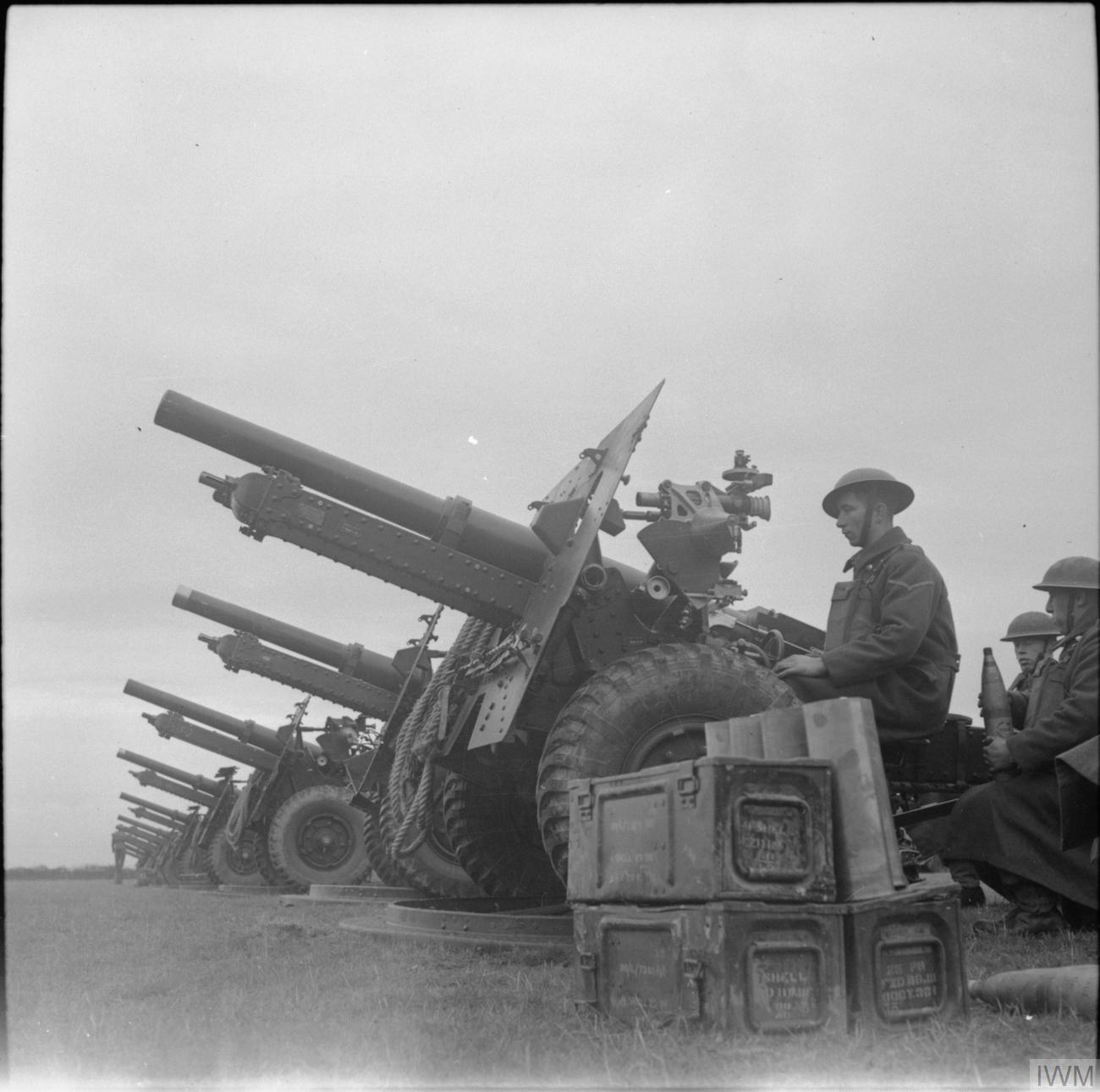
25-pounder guns of 408 Battery, 146th Field Rgt at Littlehampton, 14 November 1941.

On 1 December 1941 38th (W) Division was placed on a lower establishment; this meant that it was not going to be sent overseas for the foreseeable future, and it became a static coast defence formation in Dorset under V Corps. As the invasion threat receded, the lower establishment divisions became sources of units and drafts to reinforce the fighting formations overseas. 102nd (P&C) Field Rgt was one of the first units to leave, on 23 November 1941.

=== Tunisia ===
By October 1942, 102nd (P&C) Fd Rgt, accompanied by its own Light Aid Detachment of the Royal Electrical and Mechanical Engineers for mobile operations, had been assigned to First Army for the Allied invasion of North Africa (Operation Torch), operating once again as an Army Field Regiment. It landed at Algiers in February 1943, with one of the first self-propelled 25-pounder (Bishop) batteries to see action.

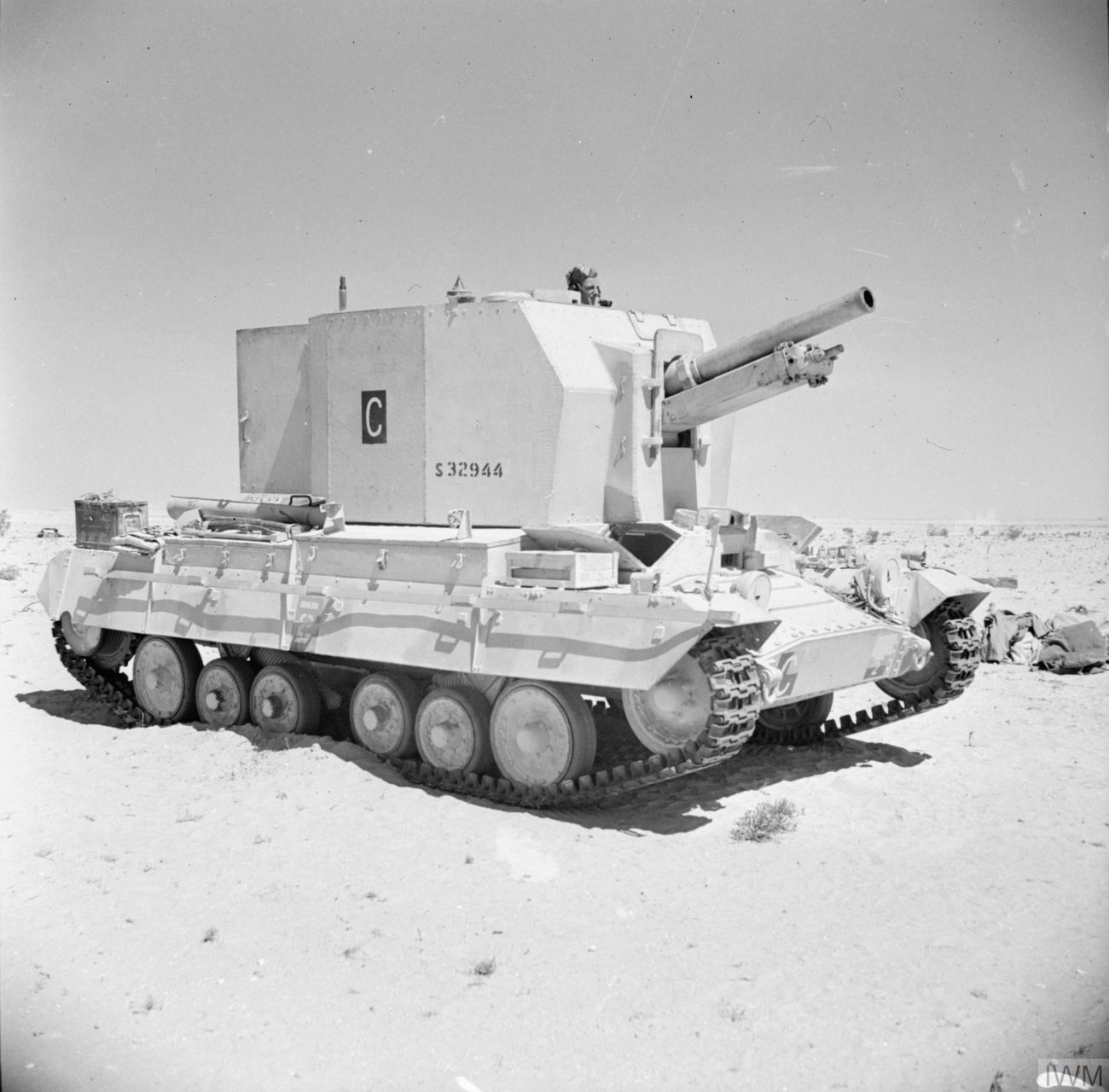
A Bishop 25-pdr SP gun in North Africa.

On 26 February 1943 the Germans launched a series of counter-attacks (Operation Ochsenkopf) against First Army. There was hard fighting in the 'Hunt's Gap' area between Maj-Gen Friedrich Weber's Korpsgruppe Weber and 128th (Hampshire) Brigade of 46th Infantry Division, commanded by Brig Manley James, VC. As well as 46th Divisional Artillery, James's brigade group was supported by one battery of 102nd (P&C) Fd Rgt. On the first day Weber's Kampfgruppe Lang overran a patrol base at Sidi Nsir, about 12 miles (19 km) north-east of Hunt's Gap, then attempted to advance on the gap over the ext two days. However, Lang's casualties in tanks and infantry were heavy, and by the evening of 1 March Weber ordered him onto the defensive. The British Official History records that 'Lang's defeat was caused mainly by the excellent British artillery fire'.

=== 102nd (Pembroke Yeomanry) Medium Regiment ===
After the fall of Tunis and the end of the Tunisian Campaign 102nd (P&C) Fd Rgt was not required for the Allied invasion of Sicily. Instead it remained in North Africa and on 18 September 1943 was converted into 102nd (Pembroke Yeomanry) Medium Regiment (its title finally reflecting the departure of the Cardigan batteries). Medium regiments equipped with the 5.5-inch gun had only two batteries, so 473 Fd Bty was disbanded in North Africa; 405 and 406 (Pembroke Yeomanry) Btys retained their titles.

=== Italy ===
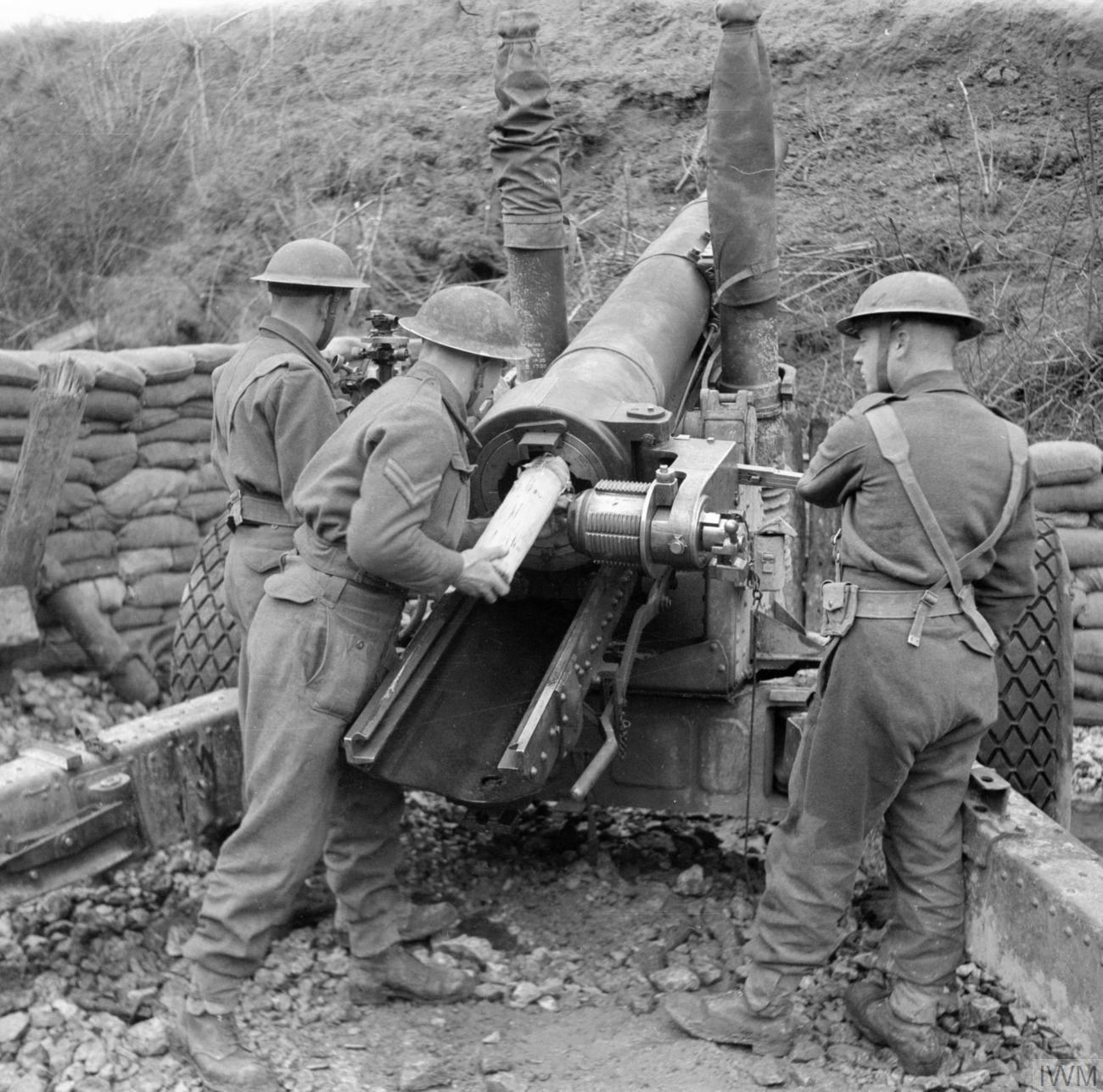
102nd Medium Regiment (Pembroke Yeomanry) with 5.5-inch medium gun, Italy 1944 (IWM NA12381).

The regiment landed in Italy to join Eighth Army in December 1943 and fought in the Italian Campaign. It was attached to 5th Division for the crossing of the Garigliano in January 1944 during the First Battle of Monte Cassino. 5th Division's attack at 21.00 on the night of 17/18 January was silent, with no preliminary bombardment, in the hope of achieving surprise. The crossing was more successful than anyone hoped, and by daylight the assaulting battalions had formed up on the opposite side of the river and were attacking with heavy artillery support. The German response was swift, but 'the Royal Artillery's crashing defensive fire' prevented their counter-attacks from succeeding. Allied attempts to widen the bridgehead the following night were a failure, as were the other elements of the Cassino battle, which became a stalemate.

For the Fourth and Final Battle of Monte Cassino (Operation Diadem), a battery of 102nd (PY) Medium Rgt supported the attack of II Polish Corps, beginning at 01.00 on 12 May. II Polish Corps HQ allocated this battery to 5th Kresowa Infantry Division, which tasked its artillery first with neutralising the German mortar positions, and then engaging the German posts on the successive hill objectives. However the counter-mortar fire was ineffective, the mortars being dug in on reverse slopes, and by the time the attacking battalions reached the bottom of their first objective, 'Phantom Ridge', they had already lost a fifth of their men. Nonetheless, elements of the Polish gained the ridge and remained on it despite fierce counter-attacks. Elsewhere along the line the massive Allied artillery support ensured a crossing of the Gari which began to outflank the hilltop Monte Cassino Monastery. The Poles renewed their attack from Phantom Ridge after four days, and on 18 May captured the monastery ruins.

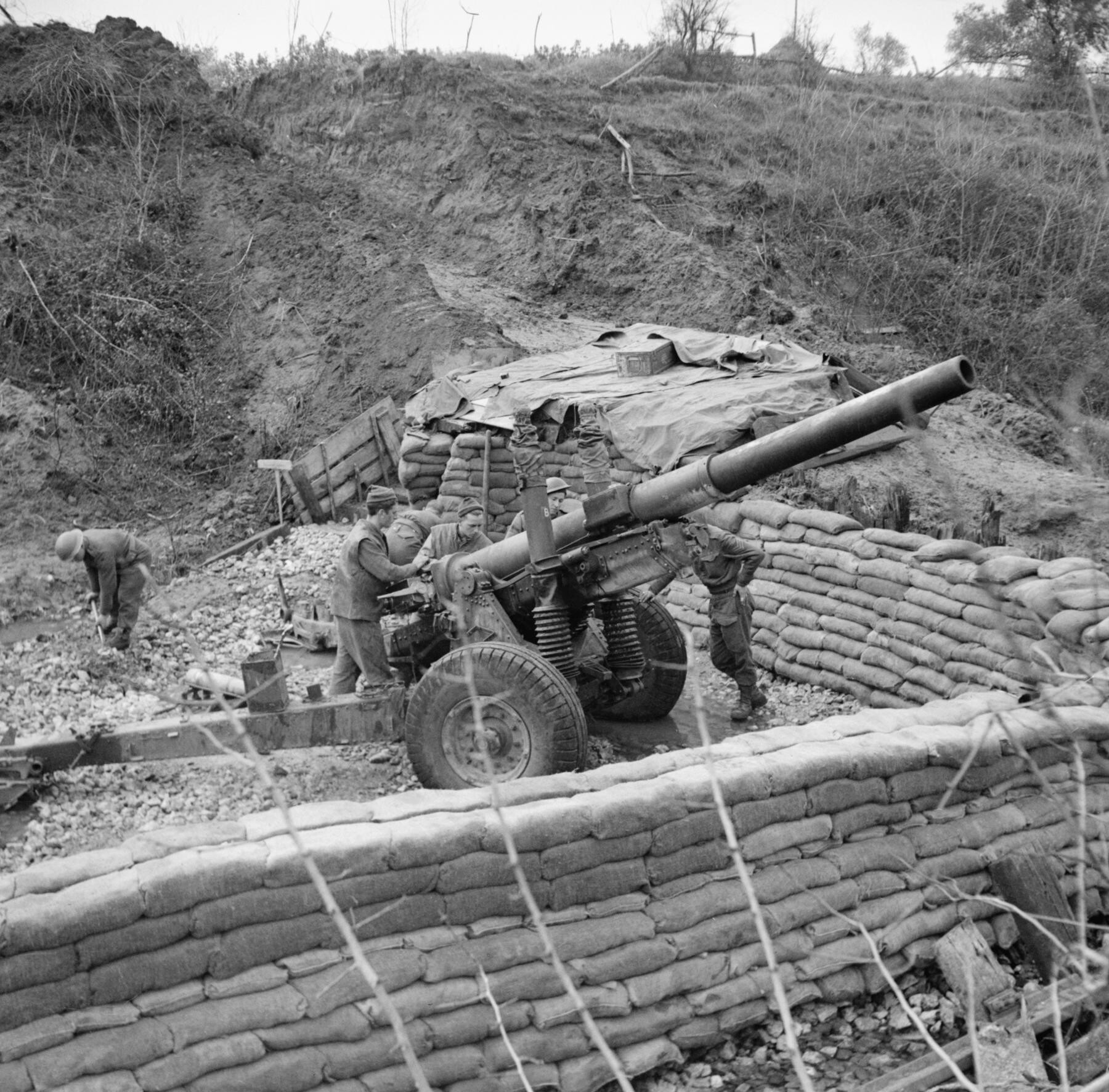
5.5-inch gun of 102nd (Pembroke Yeomanry) Medium Regiment, March 1944.

As the offensive continued to break through the German Winter Line, X Corps took up the attack. Amongst its artillery support was 2nd Army Group Royal Artillery (2nd AGRA) to which 102nd (PY) Medium Rgt was now attached. X Corps took part in the pursuit to Lake Trasimeno and subsequent advance to Florence. 2nd AGRA continued with X Corps during Operation Olive to breach the Gothic Line in August.

For the Allied Spring 1945 offensive in Italy (Operation Grapeshot), 2nd AGRA supported V Corps with the fire of five medium regiments. The corps had the task of crossing the Senio, with the defenders dug into the flood banks. These presented a difficult target, so many of the guns were moved out to the flanks so they could fire along the flood banks in enfilade . By the end of the war the regiment was on the banks of the River Po. 102nd (Pembroke Yeomanry) Medium Regiment and its batteries passed into suspended animation on 15 January 1946.

== Postwar ==
When the TA was reconstituted on 1 January 1947, 102nd (PY) Medium Rgt was reformed as 302 (Pembroke Yeomanry) Field Regiment. with RHQ at Haverfordwest. It was part of the divisional artillery of 53rd (W) Division. In 1961 the regiment reverted to its original title as the Pembroke Yeomanry (Castlemartin) when it re-roled in the Royal Armoured Corps. Later it transferred to what is now the Royal Logistic Corps, becoming 224 (Pembroke Yeomanry) Transport Squadron, which continues in today's Army Reserve.

== Insignia ==
When the regiment was first converted to artillery in 1920 it continued to wear its Pembroke Yeomanry cap badge, consisting of the Prince of Wales's feathers, coronet and 'Ich Dien' motto, with a scroll beneath carrying the Pembroke Yeomanry's unique Battle honour 'Fishguard'. However it was later badged as Royal Artillery. In 1933 the commanding officer, Lt-Col L.H. Higgon, re-introduced the Pembroke Yeomanry badge as a collar badge, which was worn during World War II. After the war 302 (PY) Field Rgt reintroduced the Pembroke Yeomanry badge for cap and collar, cavalry shoulder chains were authorised on No 1 dress, and the Pembroke Yeomanry dark blue-silver-red Stable belt was worn in place of the RA belt.
