= 146th (Pembroke and Cardiganshire) Field Regiment, Royal Artillery =

British Army unit from Wales (1939–1946)

146th (Pembroke & Cardiganshire) Field Regiment, RA 146th (Pembroke & Cardiganshire) Medium Regiment, RA
- Royal Artillery cap badge
- Active: 8 July 1939–9 January 1946
- Country: United Kingdom
- Branch: Territorial Army
- Role: Field artillery/Medium Artillery
- Size: 2–3 Batteries
- Part of: 38th (Welsh) Infantry Division; 8th Armoured Division; 7th Armoured Division; 8th Army Group Royal Artillery
- Garrison/HQ: Aberystwyth
- Nickname: 'Fishguard Express'
- Engagements: Second Battle of El Alamein; Tunisian campaign Italian campaign Operation Goodwood; Operation Bluecoat; Operation Guildford; Operation Plunder

146th Field Regiment was a Royal Artillery (RA) unit being formed in Britain's part-time Territorial Army (TA) on the outbreak of World War II. Spun off from an existing Welsh field artillery unit, it took over two Batteries from Cardiganshire and was later granted its parent's subtitle '(Pembroke & Cardiganshire)'. After serving in Home Defence it was sent to Egypt, where it took part in the Second Battle of El Alamein and then joined 7th Armoured Division for the pursuit across North Africa and the Tunisian campaign. It served briefly in Italy, then was withdrawn to the UK and converted to medium artillery for Operation Overlord. Landing in Normandy in July 1944 it participated in many of the battles of the campaign in North West Europe. It was disbanded after the end of the war.

== Mobilisation ==
With the rapid expansion of the TA after the Munich Crisis, existing units were ordered to form duplicates of themselves. 102nd (Pembroke and Cardiganshire) Field Regiment, Royal Artillery (converted from the Pembroke Yeomanry in 1920) comprised two batteries from Pembrokeshire and two from Cardiganshire, and simply split off the latter on 8 July 1939 to form 146th Field Regiment with the following organisation:

- Regimental HQ at Aberystwyth
- 407 (Cardiganshire) Field Battery at Cardigan
- 408 (Cardiganshire) Field Battery at Aberystwyth

At this time the establishment of an RA field regiment was two batteries, each of three four-gun Troops. The intention was to equip field regiments with 24 of the new 25-pounder gun-howitzers, but prior to the outbreak of war most TA units still had 18-pounder guns and 4.5-inch howitzers of World War I patterns, recently fitted with pneumatic tyres.

== 146th (Pembroke & Cardiganshire) Field Regiment ==
=== Home defence ===
38th (Welsh) Division's formation sign.

When the TA was mobilised on 1 September, just ahead of the outbreak of World War II on 3 September, both regiments were assigned to the 38th (Welsh) Infantry Division, the duplicate of the TA's 53rd (Welsh) Division that was being formed in Western Command. This new division became operational on 18 September 1939. There now followed the period known as the Phoney War. Until 14 July 1940 the division underwent training in south-east Wales in Western Command. Then, after the British Expeditionary Force's evacuation from Dunkirk, III Corps HQ took over field command in Western Command, and 38th (W) Division was stationed around Liverpool. On 16 April 1941 the division moved to IV Corps defending invasion-threatened Sussex. 38th (W) Division was in corps reserve, behind the divisions guarding the coast.

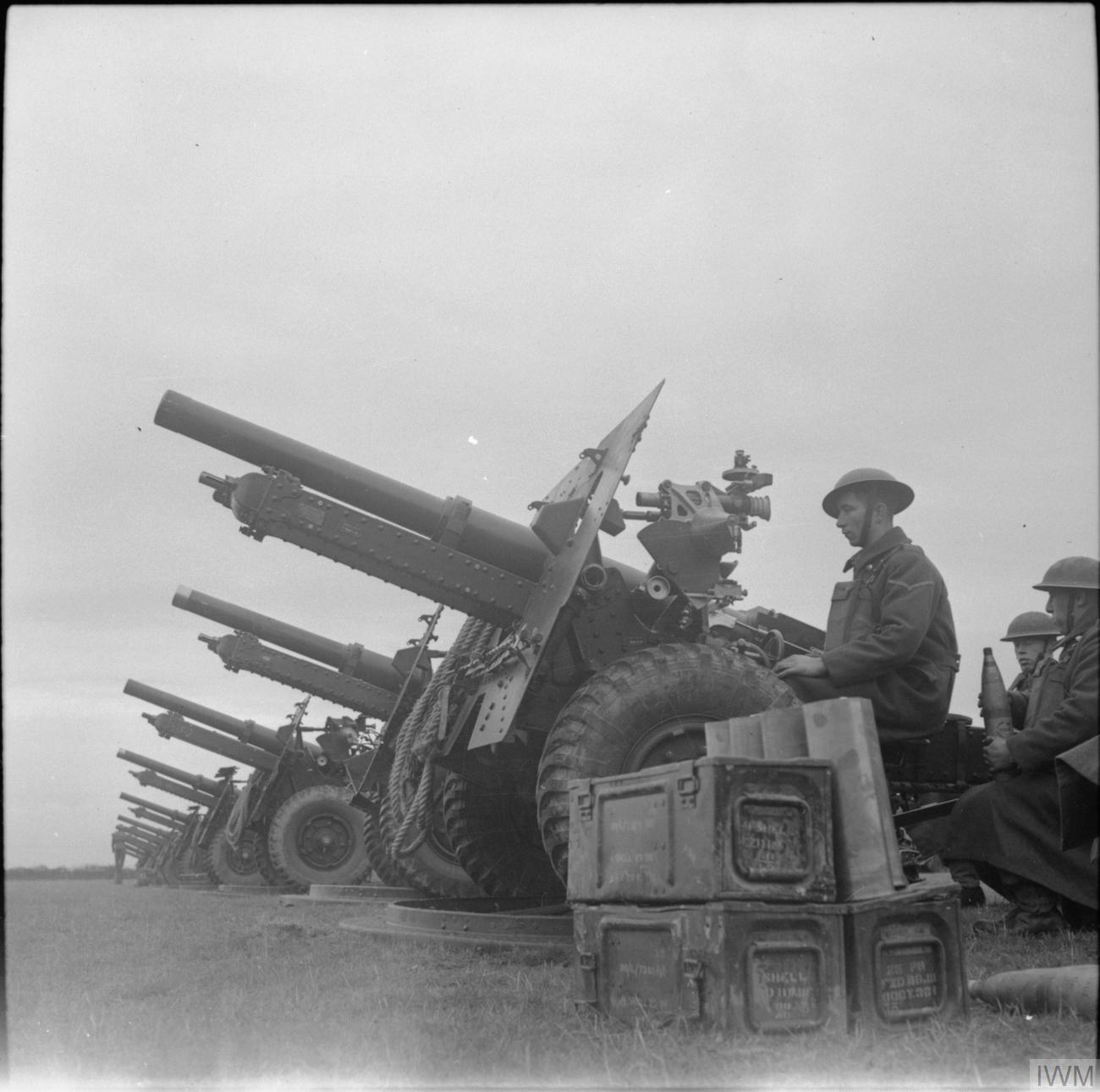
25-pounder guns of 408 Battery, 146th Field Rgt at Littlehampton, Sussex, 14 November 1941.

One of the lessons learned from the Battle of France was that the two-battery organisation did not work: field regiments were intended to support an infantry brigade of three battalions. As a result, they were reorganised into three 8-gun batteries, but it was not until late 1940 that the RA had enough trained battery staffs to carry out the reorganisation. 146th Field Rgt accordingly formed 510 Fd Bty on 14 January 1941. By now RA field regiments had standardised on the modern 25-pounder gun in place of the prewar equipment and makeshift guns issued after Dunkirk. When TA duplicate units were authorised to adopt their parent's subtitles on 17 February 1942, the 146th was given the 'Pembroke & Cardigan' title, even though it only had the Cardigan batteries.

On 1 December 1941 38th (W) Division was placed on a lower establishment; this meant that it was not going to be sent overseas for the foreseeable future, and it became a static coast defence formation in Dorset under V Corps. As the invasion threat receded, the lower establishment divisions became sources of units and drafts to reinforce the fighting formations overseas.

=== Egypt ===
146th (P&C) Field Rgt left 38th (W) Division on 13 May 1942 and was joined by 282 Anti-Tank Battery from 70th (Royal Welch Fusiliers) Anti-Tank Regiment (also from 38th (Welsh)) on 24 May. The regiment was then sent by sea to Egypt to reinforce Eighth Army fighting the Western Desert Campaign. It landed at Suez in September 1942, and on arrival, 282 A/T Bty left on 19 September and joined 95th Anti-Tank Rgt.

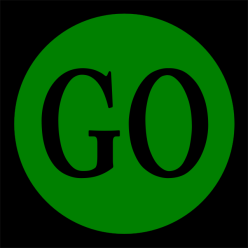
8th Armoured Division's formation sign.

146th (P&C) Field Rgt joined 8th Armoured Division on 25 September. The skeleton of this division had recently arrived in Egypt, but it was still not complete. For the planned Second Battle of El Alamein it was split up to reinforce other formations, including the HQ 8th Divisional Royal Artillery, which from 18 October constituted 'Hammerforce'. From Hammerforce 146th (P&C) Fd Rgt with its 24 x 25-pounders was directly attached to support 9th Australian Division in the forthcoming attack ('Operation Lightfoot'). The essence of the plan was that concentrated groups of 25-pdrs could be used to support first one, then another of a series of set-piece attacks, with plenty of ammunition available. The bombardment began at 21.40 on 23 October with 15 minutes of concentrated counter-battery (CB) fire to neutralise as many as possible of the enemy guns. The guns fell silent for 5 minutes before zero (22.00) then the full weight of artillery was brought down on the enemy's forwards positions as the Allied infantry began their advance. Afterwards the fire support began to vary with each attacking division's needs, the whole programme lasting about five and a half hours. One of 9th Australian Division's attacking brigades reached the final objective ('Oxalic') by dawn after some stiff fighting, the other was held up about 1,000 yards (910 m) short. Having broken into the enemy positions, the division began 'crumbling' operations the following night. It carried out another set-piece attack on 25/26 October, with plentiful artillery ammunition, and took Point 29. An Axis counter-attack on Point 29 the following day was broken up by the artillery supporting 9th Australian and by air attacks. The Australians continued attacking over following nights, with a third set-piece on 30/31 October. Eighth army had not yet achieved its hoped-for breakthrough, and a new phase of the attack, 'Operation Supercharge', was launched on 2 November. Next day the Australians found that the enemy in front was beginning to retreat, and Eighth Army began its pursuit.

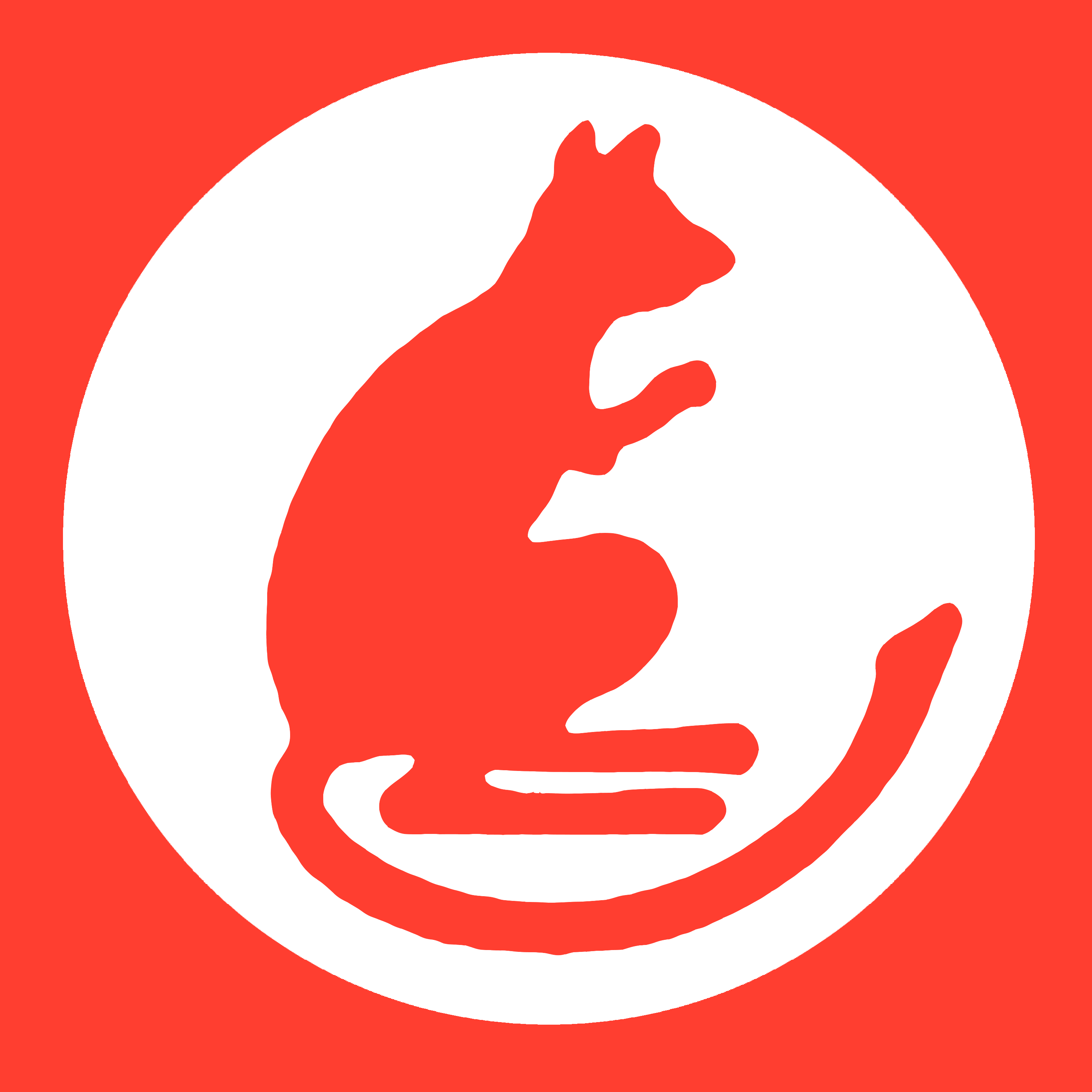
7th Armoured Division's 'Desert Rat' formation sign.

=== Tunisia ===
Hammerforce was broken up on 3 November and 8th Armoured Division was never reconstituted: 146th (P&C) Fd Rgt officially left it on 6 November. On 10 December the regiment joined 7th Armoured Division during a pause in the pursuit.

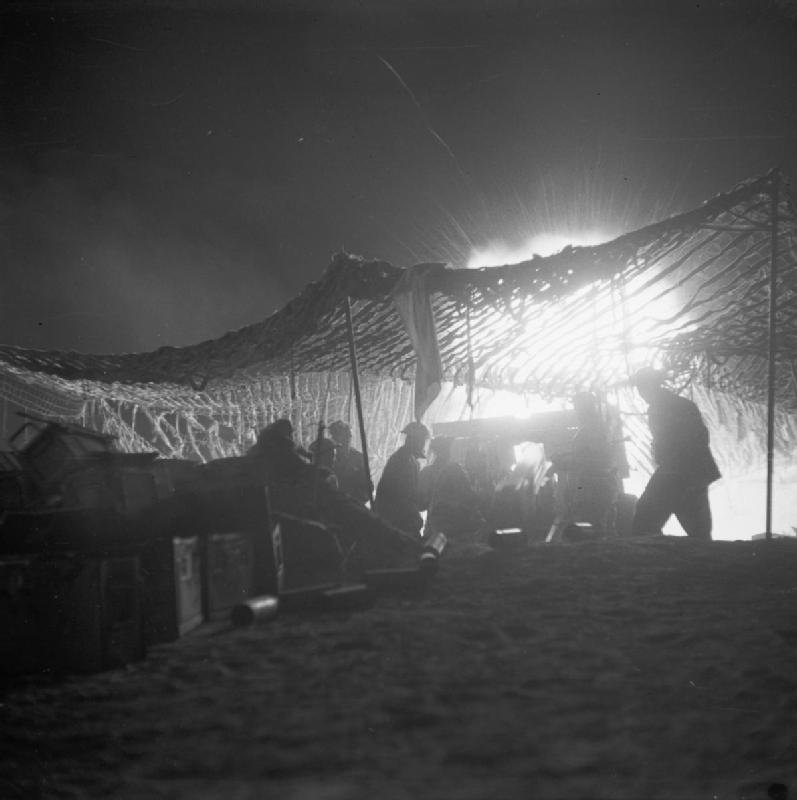
25-pounder in action during the Battle of the Mareth Line.

Eighth Army entered Tripoli on 23 January 1943 and pushed on towards Tunisia. The Axis forces counter-attacked at the Battle of Medenine on 6 March, but 7th Armoured Division was in a well-prepared position with plenty of 25-pdrs and ample ammunition. The attack was quickly broken up. 7th Armoured then took part in the set-piece Battles of the Mareth Line (16–23 March) and Wadi Akarit (6–7 April), after which it pursued the enemy up the coast to the Enfidaville position. The division was then switched to First Army for the final push to capture Tunis in Operations Vulcan and Strike (22 April–5 May).

=== Italy ===
After the end of the Tunisian campaign, 7th Armoured Division re-equipped and trained for the forthcoming Italian campaign (it was not required for Sicily). The Allied landing at Salerno (Operation Avalanche) was launched on 9 September 1943 and the division began landing on 15 September. It completed its concentration on 30 September, the leading elements having begun moving out of the beachhead two days earlier, and entered Naples on 1 October. It continued advancing against rearguards as far as the Volturno. On 12 October the division made a diversionary attack across the river while the main crossing was forced by X Corps and US troops. 7th Armoured Division forded the river near Capua at the end of the month and on 1/2 November debouched through Mondragone into the plain of the Garigliano.

7th Armoured Division was now withdrawn from the fighting to return to the UK to prepare for the Allied invasion of Normandy (Operation Overlord). 146th (P&C) Field Rgt left the division on 6 November when it joined 2nd Army Group Royal Artillery (2nd AGRA) to support the attack on Monte Camino, in which 201st Guards Brigade stormed 'Bare Arse Ridge'.

== 146th (Pembroke & Cardiganshire) Medium Regiment ==
146th (P&C) Field Rgt had been selected for conversion to medium artillery for Overlord. It was withdrawn to North Africa where it was redesignated 146th (Pembroke & Cardiganshire) Medium Regiment on 16 December. The establishment of a medium regiment was two batteries of 8 guns each; it consisted of 407 and 408 (Cardiganshire) Med Btys, and 510 Fd Bty was disbanded. The regiment then returned to the UK to prepare for Overlord. The RA's standard medium gun by now was the 5.5-inch gun.

=== Normandy ===
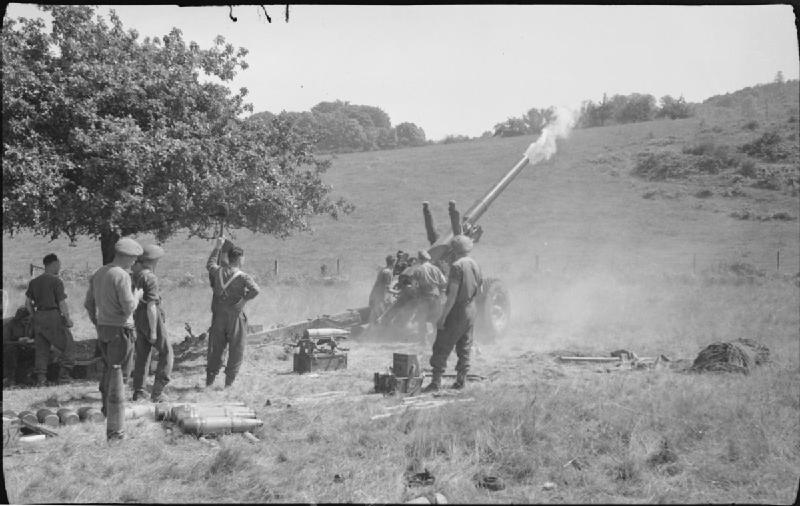
A 5.5-inch gun firing in Normandy, 1944.

After retraining the regiment joined 8th AGRA, which began landing in Normandy in June 1944 to support VIII Corps. However, landings fell behind schedule and 146th (P&C) Med Rgt did not arrive until 15 July, when it deployed at Le Mesnil-Patry under the command of Lieutenant-Colonel F.A. Bibra. It was in time to participate in the fireplan for Operation Goodwood (18 July). Goodwood was to be an armoured drive southwards from east of the River Orne, supported by massed artillery and bombers. The medium regiments had forward observation officers (FOOs) advancing with the armoured brigades. After the bombers had completed their early morning tasks, the artillery opened up at 06.05, with 8th AGRA carrying out a CB programme. Then, as most of the artillery fired a creeping barrage in front of the attack, selected units including 146th (P&C) Med Rgt carried out further CB tasks, directed by 652 Air Observation Post (AOP) Squadron, Royal Air Force. In Phases 4 and 5 of the attack, the whole of 8th AGRA switched to firing concentrations in support of the armour. 11th Armoured Division led off, followed in turn by Guards Armoured Division and 7th Armoured Division. The Germans were stunned by the bombing and initial bombardments, but recovered quickly and the attack was held up short of Bourguébus Ridge. 8th AGRA fired an additional fireplan on Bourguébus at 16.30, and at 20.55 146th (P&C) and 107th (South Notts Hussars) Medium Rgts fired again to help 11th Armoured's brigades as they withdrew to 'harbour' for the night.

8th AGRA was moved across the River Orne and loaned to II Canadian Corps for the diversionary Operation Spring on 25 July, firing a large programme of harassing fire (HF) tasks to assist the advance towards Verrières Ridge and Tilly-la-Campagne, though one troop of 146th (P&C) Med Rgt remained behind to continue HF tasks from its previous positions. There was an air raid on Mondeville in the early hours of 25 July, with German aircraft dropping anti-personnel bombs and Strafing while 146th (P&C) Med Rgt was firing an HF task. An ammunition dump was set on fire about 40 yards (37 m) behind Sergeant B.L.Jones's gun, but he and two members of his detachment put out the flames, for which he was awarded the Military Medal. VIII Corps (including 8th AGRA) was then sent from the Orne to attack on the west flank of 21st Army Group (Operation Bluecoat). This meant cutting across the lines of communication of the whole of Second British Army. Moves were mainly made by night and VIII Corps' formation signs were covered up, in order to disguise the movement. 8th AGRA moved 30 miles (48 km) from Giberville across the Orne to an area south of Bayeux during the night of 28/29 July, then a further 16 miles (26 km) to deploy north of Caumont during 29 July. There was no time for registration of the guns before the operation began, though this helped the surprise effect. 8th AGRA was allocated a flight of air observation post (AOP) aircraft to direct its fire after H Hour. Radio silence was maintained until 03.55 on D Day (30 July). There were fewer guns than normal for an attack by Second Army, and ammunition supply was limited because the 'tail' of the corps was still strung out east of the Orne when the battle began. 146th (P&C) Med Rgt was assigned to 15th (Scottish) Infantry Division for the first two phases of the attack and was then released for CB tasks. 227th (Highland) Infantry Brigade of 15th (S) Division began its Phase 1 attack with two battalions at 06.50, supported by artillery concentrations. The battalions were on their objectives by 10.30 when the other two battalions passed through to carry out Phase 2, following a creeping barrage fired by the field guns, with the medium guns 'superimposed' 300 yards (270 m) ahead. The supporting tanks pushed on to keep up with the barrage, but the infantry got left behind and waited for a fresh artillery programme to be arranged. By 15.00, when the air attacks for Phase 3 went in, the divisional commander decided to 'rush' the final objective with a single tank battalion (4th Tank Battalion, Grenadier Guards) driving through rearguards; a squadron was held up by anti-tank fire but this was dealt with by one of the artillery's CB concentrations. By 19.00 the tanks were on the final objective, with the infantry catching up later. 8th AGRA remained on call to support VIII Corps on 31 July and on 1 August 146th (P&C) Med Rgt was placed on call to XXX Corps, but by now the battle was quickly passing out of range.

On 5 August the regiments of 8th AGRA followed the advance as far as Le Bény-Bocage. German resistance was stiffening. Next day the AGRA supported a successful operation against La Buain and Montisangar by 3rd Division, with Major Johnson of 146th (P&C) Med Rgt manning a double observation post (OP) for the supporting guns. Against light opposition the fireplan was not required, but that evening 8th AGRA fired defensive fire (DF) tasks to break up counter-attacks on 11th Armoured Division. On 7 August, 3rd Division carried out two brigade attacks, supported by 146th (P&C) Med Rgt and other units of 8th AGRA, and the following day 8th AGRA fired in support of 11th Armoured, firing 23 'Yoke' tasks (all guns in the AGRA) against German counter-attacks. By now VIII Corps' offensive had run out of momentum, and the lead was taken over by XXX Corps. 146th (P&C) Medium Rgt remained at Le Bény-Bocage for some days, then supported VIII Corps' renewed attack.

146th (P&C) Medium Rgt remained at Le Bény-Bocage for some days, then supported VIII Corps' renewed attack (Operation Grouse) on 11 August. After firing concentrations to assist the initial advance, its role was to fire at opportunity targets identified by the FOOs with 3rd Division. As the advance continued slowly towards Tinchebray over the next week, 8th AGRA fired impromptu fireplans in support of 3rd Division, and CB and HF tasks. On 16 August 3rd Division entered Flers and by the following day all the guns of 8th AGRA were out of range. On 21 August the whole AGRA concentrated at Montsecret for maintenance and training.

=== Operation Guildford ===
Once the breakout from the beachhead was achieved, VIII Corps was 'grounded' to provide transport and fuel to 21st Army Group's pursuit force. It played a minor flanking role in Operation Market Garden (the Battle of Arnhem), after which it closed up to the River Maas in the autumn. This drive, beginning with Operation Constellation, entailed clearing the Venlo 'Pocket', which took from October to the beginning of December, due to a surprise German counter-attack at Meijel.

By 3 December, 15th (S) Division (temporarily under XII Corps) was ready to take the Germans' last bridgehead west of the Maas, at Blerick, opposite Venlo. Operation Guildford was a textbook operation, employing 21st Army Group's superior resources in airpower, engineering and artillery to overcome the formidable minefields, anti-tank ditches and fortifications with low casualties. 8th AGRA was among the three AGRAs devoted to supporting this attack by a single infantry brigade (44th (Lowland) Bde). The operation was a complete success.

=== Operation Plunder ===
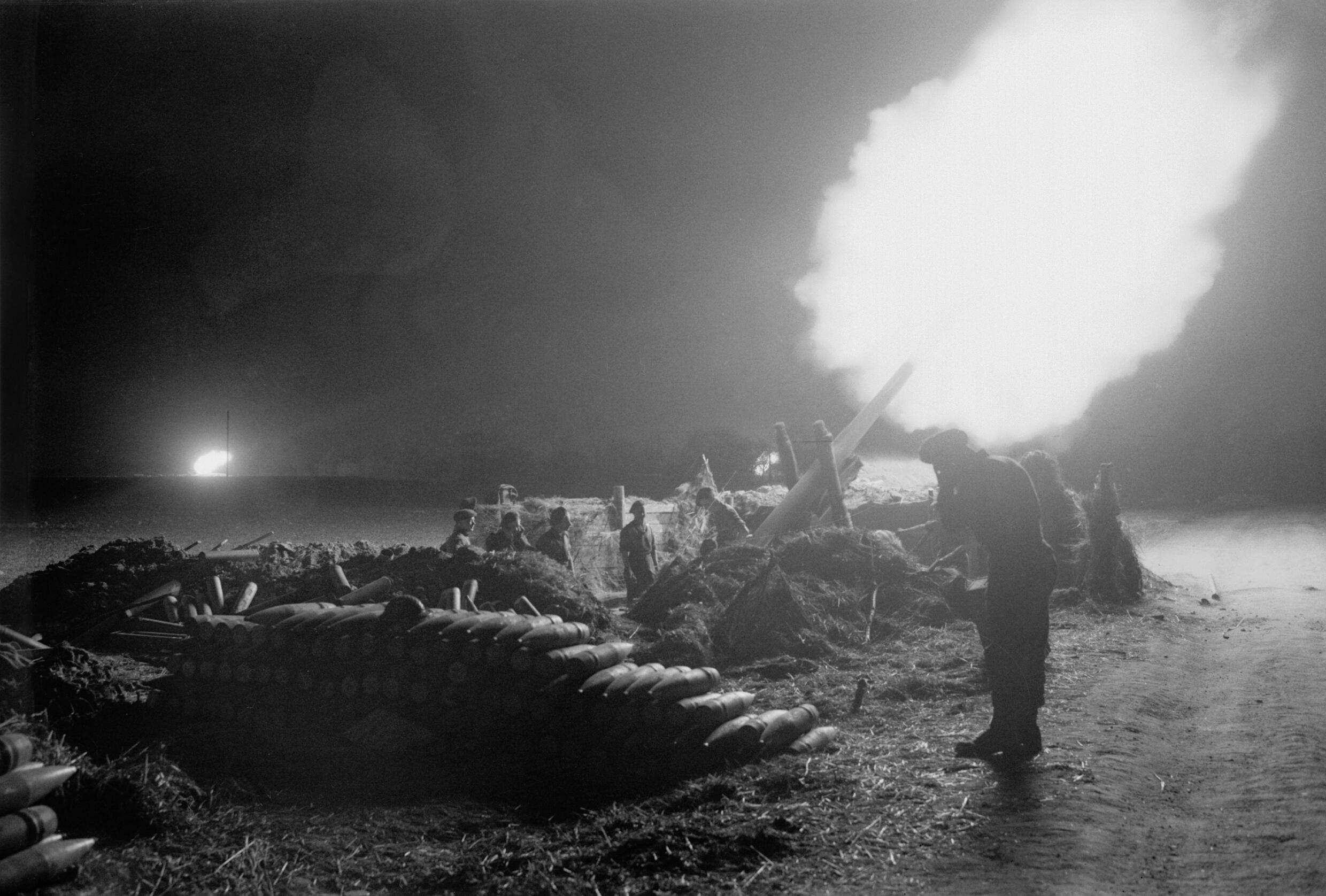
5.5-inch gun firing during the assault crossing of the Rhine, 1945.

VIII Corps and 8th AGRA were not involved in the fighting in the Reichswald (Operation Veritable) in early 1945. At the conclusion of 'Veritable' on 11 March, 21st Army Group was in position to attempt an assault crossing of the Rhine (Operation Plunder). 8th AGRA was assigned to support XII Corps for this operation. 15th (Scottish) Division was selected for the assault, 52nd (Lowland) Infantry Division holding the riverbank while the preparations were made behind a massive smokescreen, including parking the guns as close to the river as possible. 146th (P&C) and 63rd (Midland) Medium Rgts of 8th AGRA were assigned to 52nd (L) Division for the initial phase of the operation, but all the medium regiments were heavily involved in the initial CB fire on the evening of 23 March and the 'softening' bombardments that preceded the assault crossings by 1st Commando Brigade at 21.30 (Operation Widgeon) and by 15th (S) Division at 01.00 on 24 March (Operation Torchlight). The opening salvo of the 700 guns supporting 15th (S) Division was described by the divisional historian as 'earth-shaking'. The following morning the medium guns were then switched to bombardment and anti-Flak tasks to support the airborne landings (Operation Varsity).

Generally, 15th (S) Division's assault was successful, but 227th (Highland) Bde got held up at Haffen. A follow-up attack was planned using part of the divisional reserve and a squadron of DD Sherman swimming tanks that had crossed the river. At the last minute there was an erroneous report that some of the tanks were already in Haffen so the artillery support from the AGRAs was cancelled. Nevertheless, the area was largely cleared by nightfall. German counter-attacks came in against Mehr during the night, and the dangerous decision was made to use the medium guns for defensive fire close to the Scottish positions, then in the woods and close to the bridges over the River Issel where the Germans had retreated. The enemy was finally driven out of the riverside villages by 07.00 next morning and at 07.30 15th (S) Division began moving inland to the Issel.

Once the Rhine had been crossed 21st Army Group began a rapid advance across northern Germany. Apart from the crossing of the River Elbe (Operation Enterprise) there were few setpiece operations and little call for medium or heavy artillery. Increasingly, as Victory in Europe (VE Day) approached, British units were called upon to act as occupation forces. After the German surrender at Lüneburg Heath this became the role for the whole of 21st Army Group while the troops awaited demobilisation.

146th (Pembroke & Cardiganshire) Medium Regiment passed into suspended animation on 9 January 1946 and was not reformed in the postwar TA: it was officially disbanded on 1 January 1947.

== Insignia ==
Although it wore Royal Artillery cap badges, 102nd (Pembroke & Cardigan) Field Regiment had continued to use its traditional Pembroke Yeomanry badge as a collar badge. This consisted of the Prince of Wales's feathers, coronet and 'Ich Dien' motto, with a scroll beneath carrying the Pembroke Yeomanry's unique Battle honour 'Fishguard'. 146th (P&C) Medium Regiment continued this tradition, leading to its nickname, the 'Fishguard Express', during the North West Europe campaign.
