= 61st Carnarvon and Denbigh (Yeomanry) Medium Regiment, Royal Artillery =

61st Carnarvon & Denbigh (Yeomanry) Medium Brigade, RGA 61st (Carnarvon & Denbigh Yeomanry) Medium Regiment, RA
- Royal Artillery cap badge
- Active: 1 March 1922–13 March 1946
- Country: United Kingdom
- Branch: Territorial Army
- Type: Yeomanry
- Role: Medium Artillery
- Size: 2–4 Batteries
- Part of: 2nd Infantry Division; I Corps; 8th Army Group Royal Artillery
- Garrison/HQ: Colwyn Bay
- Engagements: Battle of France; Operation Jupiter; Operation Greenline; Operation Goodwood; Operation Spring; Operation Bluecoat; Operation Guildford; Operation Plunder

The 61st Carnarvon and Denbigh (Yeomanry) Medium Regiment, Royal Artillery, was a Welsh unit of Britain's part-time Territorial Army (TA) formed after World War I from existing Royal Garrison Artillery and Yeomanry Cavalry units. In World War II it fought in the Battle of France and was evacuated from Dunkirk. It returned to North-West Europe in June 1944, participating in the battles in the Orne valley and the bocage south of Caumont before the breakout from the Normandy beachhead, operations to close up to the Maas, and the assault crossing of the Rhine (Operation Plunder). The regiment continued in the postwar TA, and a successor unit continues in today's Army Reserve.

== Origin ==
The Welsh (Carnarvonshire) Heavy Battery, Royal Garrison Artillery (RGA) and the Denbighshire Hussars were units of Britain's part-time Territorial Force (TF), which had served in World War I. When the TF was reformed on 7 February 1920, the prewar Welsh (Carnarvonshire) RGA (Note: The contemporary spelling in all formal documents was 'Carnarvon', not 'Caernarvon', or today's preferred 'Caernarfon'.) was initially reformed as 12th (Carnarvon and Denbigh) Medium Brigade, RGA, (Note: In contemporary RA usage a brigade was a lieutenant-colonel's command consisting of batteries 'brigaded' together; it was not comparable with an infantry or cavalry brigade commanded by a brigadier-general. In the Territorials, unlike the Regulars, unit heritage is carried by the brigade/regiment, rather than the battery.) which was to have had its headquarters (HQ) and two batteries at Colwyn Bay and one battery at Bangor. However, when the TF was reconstituted as the Territorial Army (TA) the following year the unit was redesignated 61st Medium Brigade, RGA, with probably only one battery (241st Medium Bty) at Bangor. Similarly, the Denbighshire Hussars, a Yeomanry Cavalry regiment headquartered at Wrexham, was reformed as a mounted unit in the TF, even though it had ended World War I fighting as infantry. Wartime experience showed that the army had too many mounted units, and so only the 14 most senior Yeomanry regiments were retained in the TA as horsed cavalry, the remainder being converted to other roles. On 1 March 1922 the Denbighshire Hussars were converted to artillery and merged with the new medium brigade to form 61st Carnarvon and Denbigh (Yeomanry) Medium Brigade, RGA (Note: This is the form of the title given in the Army List; other usually authoritative sources such Frederick and Litchfield render it as '61st (Carnarvon & Denbigh Yeomanry).) as with the following organisation:

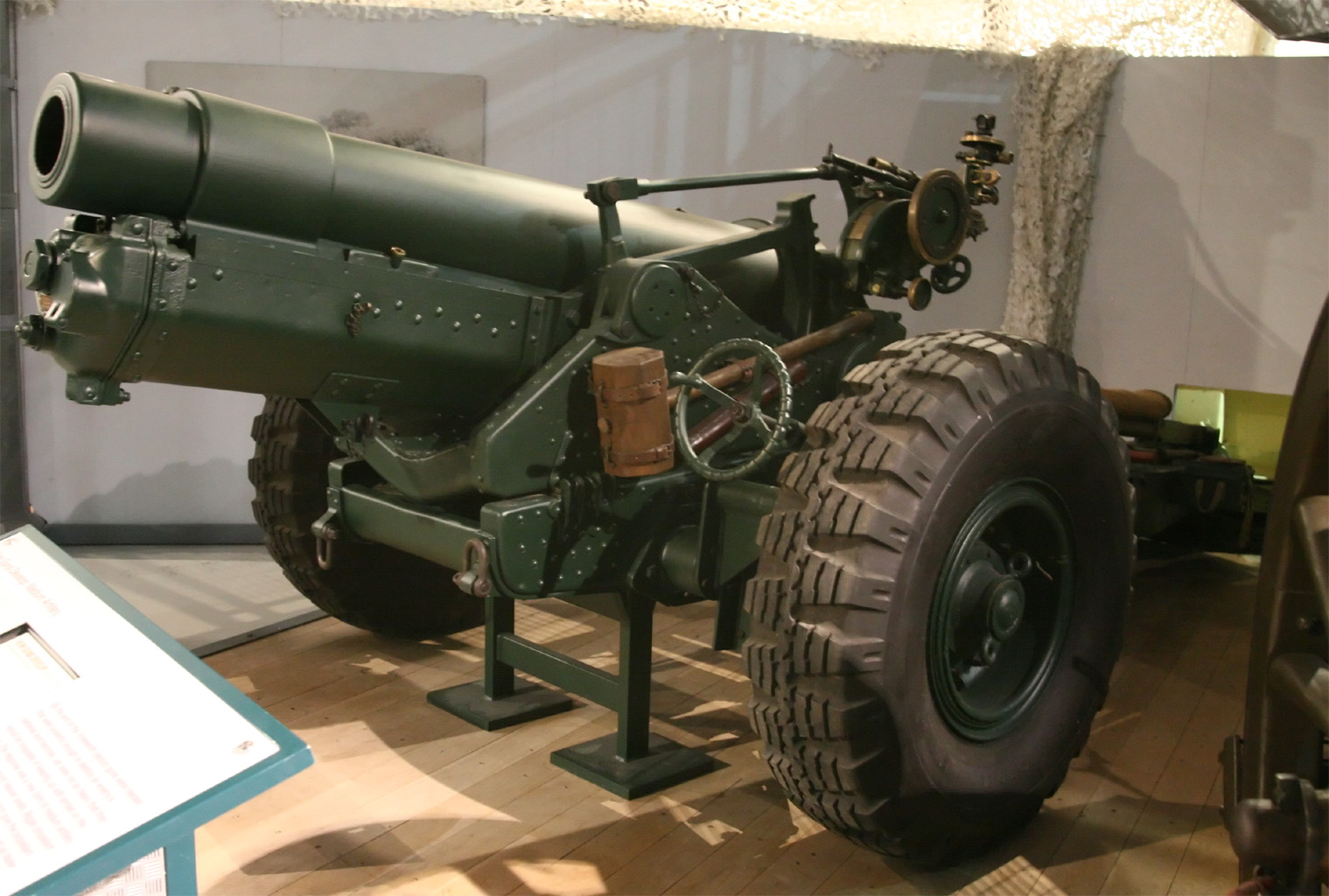
6-inch howitzer on pneumatic carriage in the collection of the Royal Artillery Museum.

- HQ at Drill Hall, Colwyn Bay, from Denbighshire Hussars
- 241st (Carnarvon) Med Bty at Bangor, from 61st Medium Bde
- 242nd (Carnarvon) Med Bty (Howitzer) at Llandudno, from Denbighshire Hussars
- 243rd (Denbigh) Med Bty (H) at Colwyn Bay, from Denbighshire Hussars
- 244th (Denbigh) Med Bty (H) at Wrexham from Denbighshire Hussars

The commanding officer (CO) was Acting Lieutenant-Colonel W.F. Christian, DSO, of the RGA, with Major W.H. Hughes (the Welsh Heavy Battery's prewar CO) as senior major. No prewar officers of the Denbigh Yeomanry were carried over to the new brigade. On 1 June 1924 the RGA was subsumed into the Royal Artillery (RA) and the titles were adjusted. The brigade was defined as 'Army Troops' in 53rd (Welsh) Divisional Area and 53rd (Welsh) Divisional Signals also included 212th Medium Artillery Signal Section, Royal Corps of Signals, to service the brigade. The establishment of a medium brigade was four 4-gun batteries, one equipped with 60-pounder guns and three with 6-inch howitzers, all of World War I patterns. These were finally fitted with pneumatic tyres in 1937.

In 1938 the RA modernised its nomenclature and a lieutenant-colonel's command was designated a 'regiment' rather than a 'brigade'; this applied to TA brigades from 1 November 1938. The TA was doubled in size after the Munich Crisis, and most regiments formed duplicates. During 1939 61st (C&DY) Med Rgt divided as follows:

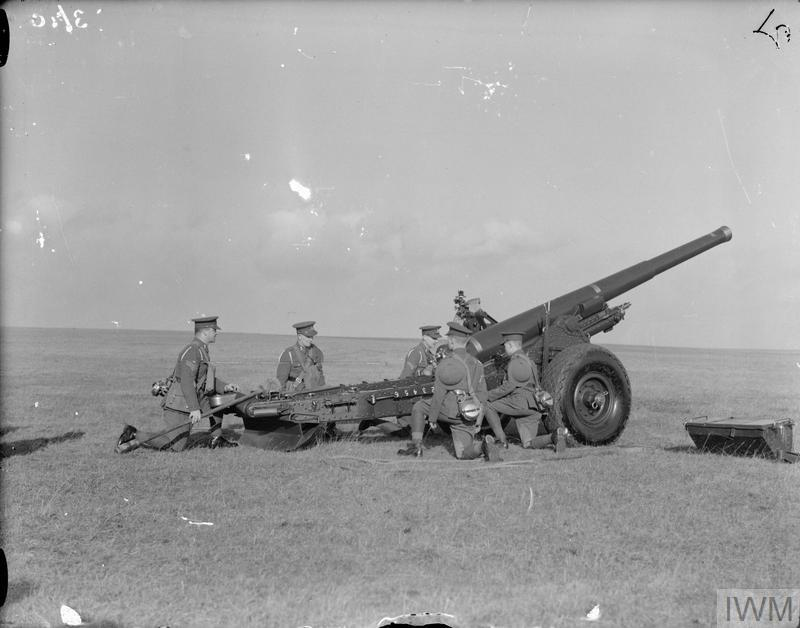
A 60-pdr gun on pneumatic gun carriage at training exercise just before World War II.

61st (Carnarvon & Denbighshire) Medium Regiment

- Regimental HQ at Colwyn Bay
- 242 (Carnarvon) Med Battery at Llandudno
- 243 (Denbigh) Med Battery at Colwyn Bay

69th Medium Regiment

- RHQ at Bangor
- 241 (Carnarvon) Med Battery at Bangor
- 244 (Denbigh) Med Battery at Wrexham

Each battery would consist of two 4-gun Troops.

== World War II ==
=== Mobilisation ===
When the TA was mobilised on 1 September, just ahead of the outbreak of World War II on 3 September, the regiment mobilised at Colwyn Bay. Under the command of the recently promoted Lt-Col G.E. Fitzhugh (who had commanded 243 Bty before the war) it crossed to France to join the British Expeditionary Force (BEF). Although classed as 'Army Troops' it was attached to 2nd Infantry Division in I Corps.

=== Battle of France ===
The period of 'Phoney War' ended with the German invasion of the Low Countries on 10 May, and in response the BEF advanced into Belgium under Plan D. Soon 61st (C&DY) Med Rgt was deployed with 2nd Division on the River Dyle, with the regiment at Chateau d'Etoiles on the extreme right of the BEF's line. C Troop fired the regiment's first round of the campaign at 17.00 on 13 May in support of 4th Brigade. However, the Germans had broken through the French positions in the Ardennes and the BEF was in danger pof being outflanked on the right. On 15 May the regiment had reports of enemy tanks approaching the gun positions and was withdrawn to Terbloc. On 16 May it was in action all day from positions some 500 yards (460 m) north of Notre-Dame-Au-Bois. The BEF now began to withdraw from its exposed positions towards the River Escaut. 61st (C&DY) Medium Rgt was on the move under very difficult conditions throughout 17 May, and on 19 May it came into action at Ere, just south of Tournai, where it fired 953 rounds. On the Escaut 2nd Division and 61st (C&DY) Med Rgt came under the command of III Corps. The enemy attacked north of Calonne on 21 May but were driven back by artillery fire. However, 61st (C&DY) Med Rgt was heavily shelled and suffered 17 casualties.

Although III Corps was successfully holding the Escaut Line, the German breakthrough had reached the English Channel and the BEF was fighting on two fronts, cut off from its bases and the main French forces. 2nd Division was switched to guarding the 'Canal Line' through St Venant–Robecq–La Bassée. Arriving on 25 May it recaptured St Venant, but at the end of the day the decision was made to withdraw the BEF and evacuate through Dunkirk. It was vital that 2nd Division held its 15 miles (24 km) wide positions to allow the other British and French forces to withdraw to the River Lys. On 26 and 27 May the division came under intense pressure from German Panzer formations, but supported by 61st (C&DY) Med Rgt and counter-attacking when it could, the division managed to maintain a line despite heavy casualties. Afterwards the division fought its way back to the Dunkirk beaches, where it was evacuated on 31 May, having destroyed all its guns and equipment.

=== Home defence ===
On return to the UK the BEF's units were reorganised and reinforced, but it was many months before the artillery could be re-equipped with anything better than a handful of obsolescent guns. Eventually the medium regiments were issued with the modern 5.5-inch gun and AEC Matador gun tractor.

By December 61st (D&DY) Med Rgt and its signal section were stationed in Northern Command. About March 1941 they were reassigned to I Corps, affiliated with 2nd Division once more until that division left to go to India at the end of the year. By the Spring of 1942 the regiment had its own Light Aid Detachment of the Royal Army Ordnance Corps (later the Royal Electrical and Mechanical Engineers (REME)) attached to it for mobile operations.

The need for a higher organisational command structure for medium and heavy artillery had become apparent during the Battle of France. The Army Group Royal Artillery (AGRA) concept was developed during Exercise 'Bumper' held in the UK in 1941, organised by the commander of Home Forces, General Alan Brooke (himself a Gunner) with Lt-Gen Bernard Montgomery as chief umpire. This large anti-invasion exercise tested many of the tactical concepts that would be used by the British Army in the latter stages of the war. The gunnery tacticians developed the AGRAs as powerful artillery brigades, usually comprising three or four medium regiments and one heavy regiment, which could be rapidly moved about the battlefield, and had the punch to destroy enemy artillery with counter-battery (CB) fire. AGRAs were provided to field armies at a scale of about one per Army corps.

61st (C&DY) Medium Rgt was assigned to 8th AGRA when it was formed on 1 May 1943 at Brandeston Hall, Woodbridge, Suffolk. It was assigned to 21st Army Group being formed for the planned invasion of Normandy (Operation Overlord), in which it generally supported operations by VIII Corps.

=== Normandy ===
Overlord was launched on D-Day, 6 June 1944, and HQ 8th AGRA landed at Arromanches on 18 June to prepare for the forthcoming Operation Epsom. However, landings fell behind schedule and 61st (C&DY) Med Rgt did not arrive until 2 July, when it deployed at St Manvieu under the command of Lt-Col D.M. Bateson. The regiment arrived in time to take part in Operation Jupiter directed against the dominating ridge of Hill 112 and the villages of Éterville and Maltot, which would open the way to the River Orne. The AGRA's tasks were to be CB, counter-Flak, counter-mortar (CM) and harassing fire (HF), some fired at extreme range. For the assault phase 61st (C&DY) Med Rgt was directly allocated to support the Royal Scots Greys of 4th Armoured Brigade aiming to exploit to the Orne in Phase 4 of the attack. Each medium regiment provided a double observation post (OP) with two forward observation officer (FOO) parties to the field regiment supporting the attacking brigade. The fireplan began on 10 July with HF tasks from 01.00 to 03.00, then heavy timed concentrations on all the known centres of enemy resistance began at 03.50: 8 AGRA's four medium regiments fired for 10 minutes on Les Duanes. 43rd (Wessex) Infantry Division got into Éterville and Maltot, but a stalemate developed on Hill 112 and Maltot was untenable unless the ridge could be taken; 4th Armoured Bde's exploitation never happened. A renewed bombardment and attack late in the day saw 43rd (W) Division gain a footing on the crest, which was held against counter-attacks during the night with artillery support. When a company of 5th Battalion Wiltshire Regiment got into difficulties later in the day, it was extricated with corps-level fire support. The medium batteries moved forward to keep them within range of the battle. Captain G.W.R. Ormerod, commanding C Trp of 61st (C&DYR), was killed when 214th Infantry Bde's HQ was shelled while he was receiving orders to establish an OP on Hill 112. 61st (C&DY) Medium Rgt had fired 1877 rounds, its highest daily total of the campaign.

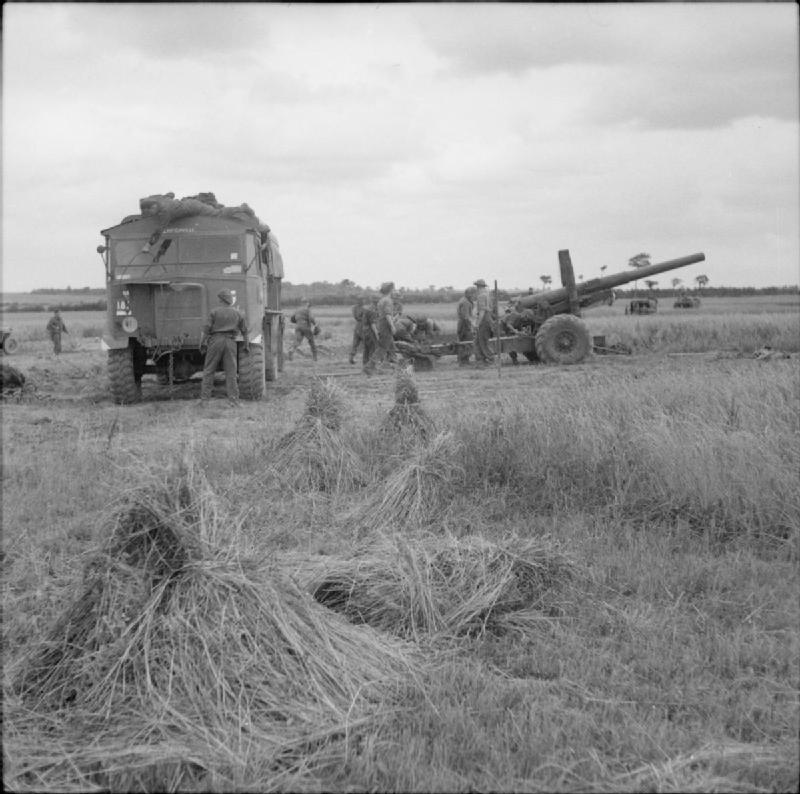
A 5.5-inch gun and its Matador tractor in Normandy.

8th AGRA next participated in Operation Greenline, a diversionary attack past Hill 112 towards the Orne. On 14 July 61st (C&DYR) Med Rgt joined of 43rd (W) divisional artillery firing at targets on the south-west slope of Hill 112 to create the impression of an attack in that direction. In the early hours of 15 July 8th AGRA carried out defensive fire (DF) tasks for 43rd (W) Division on Hill 112 while 15th (Scottish) Infantry Division launched its night attack. Unfortunately 43rd (W) Division's attempts to dominate the enemy on Hill 112 by fire failed to suppress the machine guns on the flank of 15th (S) Division's advance, and the advance bogged down. Gavrus and Bougy were taken with the support of 61st (C&DYR) Med Rgt, but by the afternoon the division was holding off fierce counter-attacks.

Even before Greenline was launched, 8th AGRA's regiment had sent their reconnaissance and digging parties to start preparing new positions south-west of Caen for Operation Goodwood. 61st (C&DYR) Med Rgt was near Saint-Contest, which, although on a plateau, had good flash cover from enemy observation. The 5.5-inch guns had 350 rounds per gun (rpg) dumped for the operation. Goodwood was to be an armoured drive southwards from east of the River Orne, supported by massed artillery and bombers. The medium regiments had FOOs advancing with the armoured brigades. After the bombers had completed their early morning tasks, the artillery opened up at 06.05, with the regiments of 8th AGRA carrying out a CB programme, then firing concentrations on specific targets in support of the armoured divisions without pause until 22.00. The Germans were stunned by the bombing and initial bombardments, but recovered quickly and the attack was held up short of Bourguébus Ridge. VIII Corps had advanced 6 miles (9.7 km) on 18 July, but otherwise the results had been disappointing and casualties heavy. While the corps reorganised the following morning 8 AGRA fired concentrations on Bras and Hubert-Folie. 11th Armoured Division captured Bras in the afternoon. When 3rd RTR got into trouble, the field artillery FOOs called down the medium guns, whose shells could stop German armour, and two panzers were 'brewed up'. It took until the end of the day to capture Hubert-Folie. Rain made observation difficult on 20 July and the emphasis switched to II Canadian Corps attacking out of Caen towards Verrières Ridge in Operation Atlantic. At midday the objectives became a 'Murder target', subjected to the fire of two divisional artilleries and three AGRAs: 59 tones of shells in 3 minutes' rapid fire.

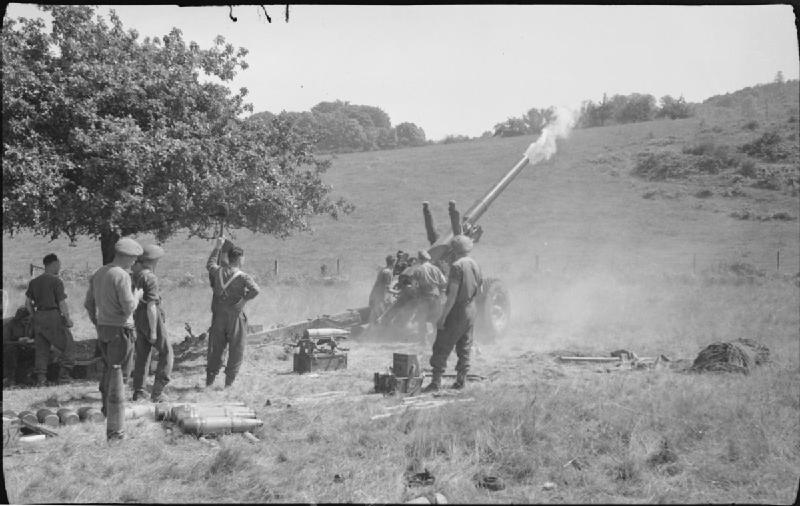
A 5.5-inch gun firing in Normandy.

8th AGRA was loaned to II Canadian Corps for the diversionary Operation Spring on 25 July, firing a large programme of harassing fire (HF) tasks to assist the advance towards Verrières Ridge and Tilly-la-Campagne, with 61st (C&DY) Med Rgt in support of 7th Armoured Division. VIII Corps (including 8th AGRA) was then sent from its positions east of the River Orne to attack on the right flank of 21st Army Group (Operation Bluecoat). This meant cutting across the lines of communication of the whole of Second British Army. Moves were mainly made by night and VIII Corps' formation signs were covered up, in order to disguise the movement. 8th AGRA moved 30 miles (48 km) from Giberville across the Orne to an area south of Bayeux during the night of 28/29 July, then a further 16 miles (26 km) to deploy north of Caumont during 29 July. There was no time for registration of the guns before the operation began, though this helped the surprise effect. 8th AGRA was allocated a flight of air observation post (AOP) aircraft to direct its fire after H Hour. Radio silence was maintained until 03.55 on D Day (30 July). There were fewer guns than normal for an attack by Second Army, and ammunition supply was limited because the 'tail' of the corps was still strung out east of the Orne when the battle began. 61st (C&DY) Medium Rgt was assigned to 15th (S) Division, whose 227th (Highland) Infantry Brigade began its Phase 1 attack with two battalions at 06.50, supported by artillery concentrations. The battalions were on their objectives by 10.30 when the other two battalions passed through to carry out Phase 2, following a creeping barrage fired by the field guns, with the medium guns 'superimposed' 300 yards (270 m) ahead. The supporting tanks pushed on to keep up with the barrage, but the infantry got left behind and waited for a fresh artillery programme to be arranged. By 15.00, when the air attacks for Phase 3 went in, the divisional commander decided to 'rush' the final objective with a single tank battalion (4th Tank Battalion, Grenadier Guards) driving through rearguards; a squadron was held up by anti-tank fire but this was dealt with by one of the artillery's CB concentrations. By 19.00 the tanks were on the final objective, with the infantry catching up later. The fighting continued on 1 August, 8 AGRA and Royal Air Force Typhoon fighter-bombers bombarding a concentration of German tanks and infantry that had been located in the Bois de Homme, and massed artillery fire helped to break up German counter-attacks. However the battle was quickly moving out of range, so 61st (C&DY) Med Rgt was put at the disposal of the neighbouring XXX Corps. The situation was so confused that after the cancellation of one target 61st (C&DY) Med Rgt's guns had to remain loaded because there was no safe place to shoot. By 2 August the German front was cracked wide open and units were following up. 61st (C&DY) Medium Rgt remaining on call to support 15th (S) Division.

On 5 August the regiments of 8th AGRA followed the advance as far as Le Bény-Bocage. German resistance was stiffening. Next day, against light opposition, the fireplan was not required, but that evening 8th AGRA fired defensive fire (DF) tasks to break up counter-attacks on 11th Armoured Division. The dumping of 300 rpg of ammunition suggested to 61st (C&DY) Med Rgt that the chase was over, and a set-piece action would be needed. Next day 15th (S) Divion attacked, but despite the support of 8th AGRA was held up at its first objectives and could get no further. A further attack on 7 August by 3rd Division, supported by 61st (C&DY) Med Rgt and other units of 8th AGRA, was unsuccessful. By now VIII Corps' offensive had run out of momentum, and the lead was taken over by XXX Corps.

VIII Corps renewed its attack with Operation Grouse on 11 August. BY niow 61st (C&DY) Med Rgt had moved up to La Lande, east of Vire and only 3,000 yards (2,700 m) from the enemy. 8th AGRA began with an 'Apple pie' (anti-Flak) programme before H-Hour, and then 61st (C&DY) and 146th (Pembroke & Cardiganshire) Med Rgts fired a CB programme before switching to opportunity targets identified by the FOOs with 3rd Division. As the advance continued slowly towards Tinchebray over the next week, 8th AGRA fired impromptu fireplans in support of 3rd Division, supported by the batteries of 165th Heavy Anti-Aircraft Rgt temporarily under command of 61st (C&DY) Med Rgt. On 16 August 3rd Division entered Flers and by the following day all the guns of 8th AGRA were out of range. On 21 August the whole AGRA concentrated at Montsecret for maintenance and training.

=== Operation Guildford ===
Once the breakout from the Normandy beachhead was achieved, VIII Corps was 'grounded' at Vire to provide transport and fuel to 21st Army Group's pursuit force. It played a minor flanking role in Operation Market Garden (the Battle of Arnhem), after which it closed up to the River Maas in the autumn. This drive, beginning with Operation Constellation, entailed clearing the Venlo 'Pocket', which took from October to the beginning of December, due to a surprise German counter-attack at Meijel.

By 3 December 15 (S) Division (temporarily under XII Corps) was ready to take the Germans' last bridgehead west of the Maas, at Blerick, opposite Venlo. Operation Guildford was a textbook operation, employing 21st Army Group's superior resources in airpower, engineering and artillery to overcome the formidable minefields, anti-tank ditches and fortifications with low casualties. 8th AGRA was among the three AGRAs devoted to supporting this attack by a single infantry brigade (44th (Lowland) Bde). The operation was a complete success.

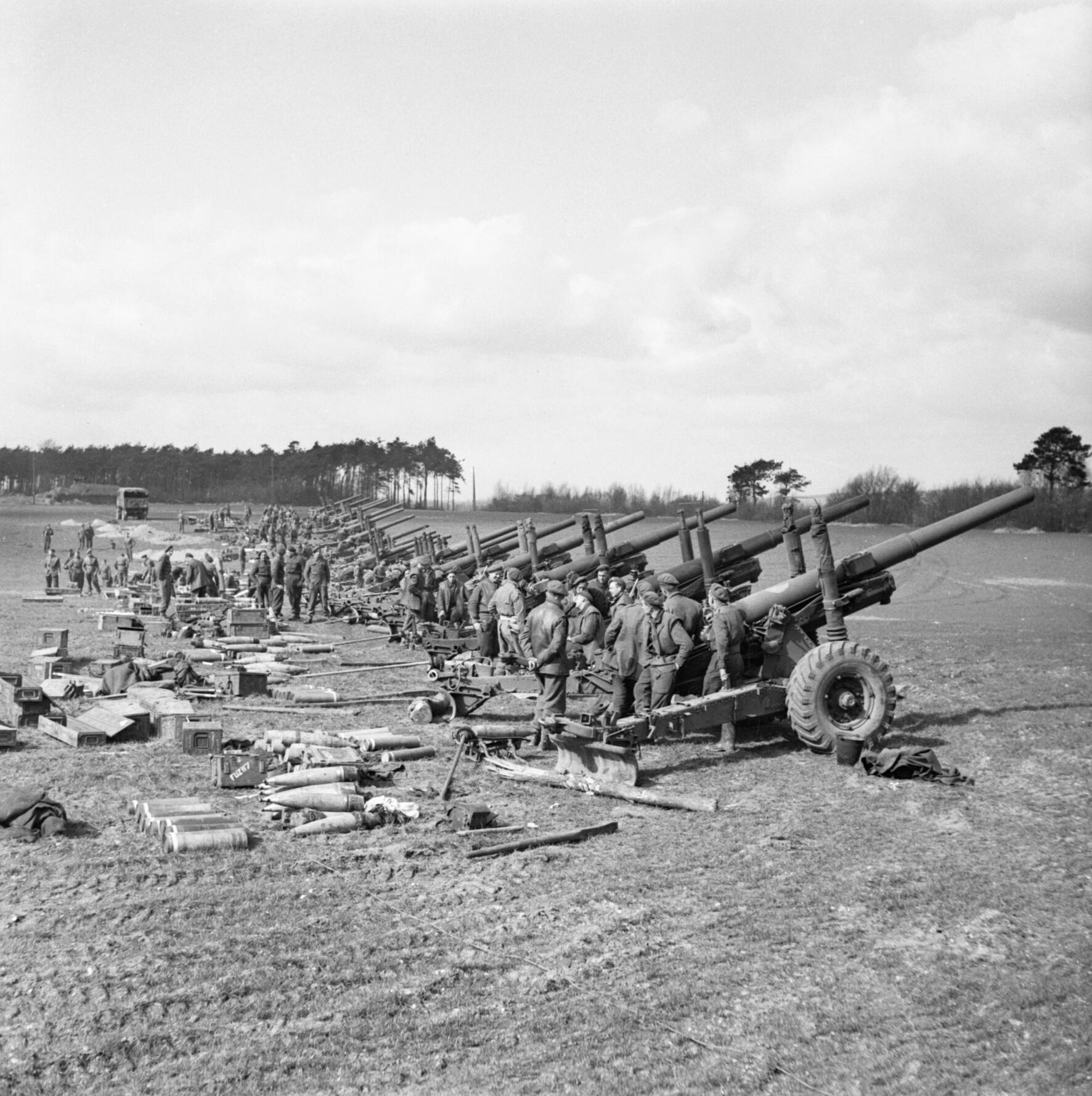
5.5-inch guns lined up to support the Rhine crossing.

=== Operation Plunder ===
VIII Corps and 8th AGRA were not involved in the fighting in the Reichswald (Operation Veritable) in early 1945. At the conclusion of 'Veritable' on 11 March, 21st Army Group was in position to attempt an assault crossing of the Rhine (Operation Plunder). 8th AGRA was assigned to support XII Corps for this operation. 15th (Scottish) Division was selected for the assault, while the preparations were made behind a massive smokescreen, including parking the guns as close to the river as possible. The artillery was organised into ad hoc groups for this operation, 61st (C&DY) Med Rgt remaining under 8th AGRA HQ, which also had a US Field Artillery Group of 36 heavy guns under its command. All the medium and heavy regiments were heavily involved in the initial CB programme (codenamed 'Blotter') on the evening of 23 March and the 'softening' bombardments that preceded the assault crossings by 15th (S) Division at 01.00 on 24 March (Operation Torchlight). The opening salvo of the 700 guns supporting 15th (S) Division was described by the divisional historian as 'earth-shaking'. The following morning the medium guns were then switched to bombardment and anti-flak tasks to support the airborne landings (Operation Varsity).

Generally, 15th (S) Division's assault was successful, but 227th (Highland) Bde got held up at Haffen. A follow-up attack was planned using part of the divisional reserve and a squadron of DD Sherman swimming tanks that had crossed the river. At the last minute there was an erroneous report that some of the tanks were already in Haffen so the artillery support from the AGRAs was cancelled. Nevertheless, the area was largely cleared by nightfall. German counter-attacks came in against Mehr during the night, and the dangerous decision was made to use the medium guns for defensive fire close to the Scottish positions, then in the woods and close to the bridges over the River Issel where the Germans had retreated. The enemy was finally driven out of the riverside villages by 07.00 next morning and at 07.30 15th (S) Division began moving inland to the Issel.

Once the Rhine had been crossed 21st Army Group began a rapid advance across northern Germany. Apart from the crossing of the River Elbe (Operation Enterprise) there were few setpiece operations and little call for medium or heavy artillery. Increasingly, as Victory in Europe (VE Day) approached, British units were called upon to act as occupation forces. After the German surrender at Lüneburg Heath this became the role for the whole of 21st Army Group while the troops awaited demobilisation.

The regiment began to enter suspended animation in British Army of the Rhine 1 March 1946, completing the process by 13 March.

== Postwar ==
When the TA was reconstituted on 1 January 1947 the regiment reformed at Colwyn Bay as 361 (Carnarvon, and Denbigh Yeomanry) Medium Regiment (Note: The positioning of the comma in the title was significant: it recognised that the original Caernarfonshire component had been artillery and not yeomanry.)

In 1956 the regiment amalgamated with 384th (Royal Welch Fusiliers) Light Regiment to form 372nd (Flintshire and Denbighshire Yeomanry) Field Regiment, with RHQ moving to Prestatyn in Flintshire. After various mergers the unit became infantry as part of the Royal Welch Fusiliers. However, the Denbighshire Hussars lineage was recreated in 2013 when a new 398 (Flintshire & Denbighshire Yeomanry) Transport Squadron, Royal Logistic Corps, was formed in the Army Reserve.
