= Operation Epsom order of battle =

This is the order of battle for Operation Epsom, a Second World War battle between British and German forces in Normandy, France between 26 June and 30 June 1944.

== British order of battle ==
Second Army General Officer Commanding-in-Chief Lieutenant-General Miles Dempsey

VIII Corps Lieutenant-General Sir Richard O'Connor
Corps Troops	
91st (Argyll & Sutherland Highlanders) Anti-Tank Regiment, Royal Artillery	
121st (The Leicestershire Regiment) Light Anti-Aircraft Regiment, Royal Artillery	
21st Army Group Troops (attached to VIII Corps for Epsom)	
8th Army Group Royal Artillery	16 BL 5.5 inch Medium Guns, 16 BL 7.2 inch Howitzer Mk.Is; 24 heavy anti-aircraft guns.
11th Armoured Division Major-General George Roberts	
2nd Northamptonshire Yeomanry	Armoured reconnaissance regiment 'A' squadron was detached for Operation Epsom; Cromwell medium and M5 Stuart light tanks
77th (Duke of Lancaster's Own Yeomanry) Medium Regiment, Royal Artillery	Attached from 8th AGRA
75th Anti-Tank Regiment, Royal Artillery	
58th (Argyll and Sutherland Highlanders) Light Anti-Aircraft Regiment, Royal Artillery	Less two batteries
Counter-Mortar Battery, Royal Artillery	
13th, 612th Field Squadrons, Royal Engineers	
147th Field Park Squadron, Royal Engineers	
10th Bridging Troop, Royal Engineers	
4th Armoured Brigade Brigadier John Currie	Attached for Operation Epsom
The Royal Scots Greys (2nd Dragoons)	Sherman II, Sherman Vc "Firefly" and M5 Stuart tanks
3rd County of London Yeomanry (Sharpshooters)	Sherman II, Sherman Vc and M5 Stuarts
44th Royal Tank Regiment	Sherman II, Sherman Vc and M5 Stuarts
2nd Battalion, King's Royal Rifle Corps	
4th Regiment, Royal Horse Artillery	Sexton self-propelled 25-pounder guns
144th Battery, 91st (A&SH) Anti-Tank Regiment, Royal Artillery	M10C 'Achilles' self-propelled anti-tank guns
29th Armoured Brigade Brigadier C.B.C. Harvey	
23rd Hussars	Sherman V, Sherman Vc and M5 Stuarts
3rd Royal Tank Regiment	Sherman V, Sherman Vc and M5 Stuarts
2nd Fife and Forfar Yeomanry	Sherman V, Sherman Vc and M5 Stuarts
8th Battalion, Rifle Brigade (Prince Consort's Own)	
13th Regiment, Royal Horse Artillery (Honourable Artillery Company)	Sexton self-propelled 25-pounder guns
119th Battery, 75th Anti-Tank Regiment, Royal Artillery	M10 and M10C SP Anti-Tank Guns
Troop, 612th Field Squadron, Royal Engineers	
159th Infantry Brigade Brigadier J.G. Sandie	
4th Battalion, The King's Shropshire Light Infantry	
1st Battalion, The Herefordshire Regiment	
3rd Battalion, The Monmouthshire Regiment	
2nd (Independent) Machine-Gun Company, Royal Northumberland Fusiliers	
151st (Ayrshire Yeomanry) Field Regiment, Royal Artillery	Towed 25-pounder field gun-howitzer
117th Battery, 75th Anti-Tank Regiment, Royal Artillery	
81st Squadron, 6th Assault Regiment, Royal Engineers	Elements attached from 79th Armoured Division; 2 x Churchill Armoured Vehicle Royal Engineers (AVRE) with scissors bridges
15th (Scottish) Infantry Division Major-General G.H. MacMillan
Divisional Troops	
15th Scottish Reconnaissance Regiment, Royal Armoured Corps	Humber Light Reconnaissance Car; Humber armoured car
HQ and 346th Battery, 97th Anti-Tank Regiment, Royal Artillery	
HQ 119th Light Anti-Aircraft Regiment, Royal Artillery	
HQ 15th Divisional Engineers	
624th Field Park Company, Royal Engineers	
26th Bridging Platoon, Royal Engineers	
HQ 1st Battalion, The Middlesex Regiment (Machine Gun)	Vickers machine guns and 4.2-inch mortars
44th (Lowland) Infantry Brigade Brigadier H.D.K. Money	
6th Battalion, The King's Own Scottish Borderers	
6th Battalion, The Royal Scots Fusiliers	
8th Battalion, Royal Scots	
141st (Buffs) Regiment, Royal Armoured Corps	2 x Troops Churchill Crocodile flamethrower tanks attached from 79th Armoured Division
A Company, 1st Battalion, Middlesex Regiment (Machine Gun)	Vickers MGs, platoon of 4.2-inch mortars
190th Field Regiment, Royal Artillery	Towed 25-pounder field guns
159th Battery, 97th Anti-Tank Regiment, Royal Artillery	
Battery, 119th Light Anti-Aircraft Regiment, Royal Artillery	
81st Squadron, 6th Assault Regiment, Royal Engineers	Two Troops Churchill AVREs attached from 79th Armoured Division
279th Field Company, Royal Engineers	
46th (Highland) Infantry Brigade Brigadier C.M. Barber	
2nd Battalion, The Glasgow Highlanders	
7th Battalion, The Seaforth Highlanders	
9th Battalion, The Cameronians (Scottish Rifles)	
A Squadron, 2nd Northamptonshire Yeomanry	Attached from 11th Armoured Division; Cromwell tanks
Two Troops 141st (Buffs) Regiment, Royal Armoured Corps	Two troops Churchill Crocodiles attached from 79th Armoured Division
B Company, 1st Battalion, The Middlesex Regiment (Machine Gun)	Vickers MGs, platoon of 4.2-inch mortars
181st Field Regiment, Royal Artillery	Towed 25-pounder field guns
161st Battery, 97th Anti-Tank Regiment, Royal Artillery	
Battery, 119th Light Anti-Aircraft Regiment, Royal Artillery	
81st Squadron, 6th Assault Regiment, Royal Engineers	Three troops Churchill AVREs attached from 79th Armoured Division
278th Field Company, Royal Engineers	
227th (Highland) Infantry Brigade Brigadier J.R. Mackintosh-Walker	
2nd Battalion, The Argyll and Sutherland Highlanders	
2nd Battalion, The Gordon Highlanders	
10th Battalion, The Highland Light Infantry (City of Glasgow Regiment)	
C Company, 1st Battalion, The Middlesex Regiment (Machine Gun)	Vickers MGs, platoon of 4.2-inch mortars
131st (Lowland – City of Glasgow) Field Regiment, Royal Artillery	Towed 25-Pounder field guns
286th Battery, 97th Anti-Tank Regiment, Royal Artillery	
391st Battery, 119th Light Anti-Aircraft Regiment, Royal Artillery	
20th Field Company, Royal Engineers	
31st Independent Tank Brigade Brigadier G.S. Knight	Attached for Operation Epsom
7th Royal Tank Regiment	Churchill tanks
9th Royal Tank Regiment	Churchill tanks
C Squadron, 2nd County of London Yeomanry (Westminster Dragoons)	Attached from 79th Armoured Division; Sherman Crab flail tanks
B Squadron, 22nd Dragoons	Attached from 79th Armoured Division; Sherman Crabs
43rd (Wessex) Infantry Division Major-General Ivor Thomas
Divisional Troops	
43rd (Wessex) Reconnaissance Regiment, Royal Armoured Corps (The Gloucestershire Regiment)	Armoured cars, light reconnaissance cars; not in action during Epsom
HQ 8th Battalion, The Middlesex Regiment (Machine Gun)	Vickers machine guns and 4.2-inch mortars
HQ and 236th Battery, 59th (Duke of Connaught's Hampshire) Anti-Tank Regiment, Royal Artillery	
HQ and 362nd Battery, 110th (7th Dorset) Light Anti-Aircraft Regiment, Royal Artillery	
HQ 43rd (Wessex) Divisional Engineers	
207th (Wessex) Field Park Company, Royal Engineers	
129th Infantry Brigade Brigadier G.H.L. Luce	
4th Battalion, The Somerset Light Infantry	
4th Battalion, The Wiltshire Regiment	
5th Battalion, The Wiltshire Regiment	
A Company, 8th Battalion, The Middlesex Regiment (Machine Gun)	Vickers MGs, platoon of 4.2-inch mortars
94th (Queen's Own Dorset Yeomanry) Field Regiment, Royal Artillery	Towed 25-Pounder field guns
235th Battery, 59th (DoCH) Anti-Tank Regiment, Royal Artillery	
360th Battery, 110th Light Anti-Aircraft Regiment, Royal Artillery	
30th Independent Anti-Aircraft Troop	
206th (Hampshire) Field Company, Royal Engineers	
130th Infantry Brigade Brigadier N.D. Leslie	
4th Battalion, The Dorsetshire Regiment	
5th Battalion, The Dorsetshire Regiment	
7th Battalion, The Hampshire Regiment	
B Company, 8th Battalion, The Middlesex Regiment (Machine Gun)	Vickers MGs, platoon of 4.2-inch mortars
112th (Wessex) Field Regiment, Royal Artillery	Towed 25-Pounder field guns
233rd Battery, 59th (DoCH) Anti-Tank Regiment, Royal Artillery	
362nd Battery, 110th Light Anti-Aircraft Regiment, Royal Artillery	
32nd Independent AA Troop, Royal Artillery	
553rd Field Company, Royal Engineers	
214th Infantry Brigade Brigadier Hubert Essame	
1st Battalion, The Worcestershire Regiment	
5th Battalion, The Duke of Cornwall's Light Infantry	
7th Battalion, The Somerset Light Infantry	
C Company, 8th Battalion, The Middlesex Regiment (Machine Gun)	Vickers MGs, platoon of 4.2-inch mortars
179th Field Regiment, Royal Artillery	Towed 25-pounder field guns
333rd Battery, 59th (DoCH) Anti-Tank Regiment, Royal Artillery	
361st Battery, 110th Light Anti-Aircraft Regiment, Royal Artillery	
31st Independent Anti-Aircraft Troop, Royal Artillery	
260th (Wessex) Field Company, Royal Engineers	
32nd (Guards) Infantry Brigade Brigadier George Johnson	The first major formation of Guards Armoured Division to land in Normandy; attached on 28 June for the remainder of Operation Epsom
1st Battalion, Welsh Guards	
3rd Battalion, Irish Guards	
5th Battalion, Coldstream Guards	
55th (Wessex) Field Regiment, Royal Artillery (West Somerset Yeomanry)	
21st Anti-Tank Regiment, Royal Artillery	Less one battery
615th Field Squadron, Royal Engineers

== German order of battle ==
Seventh Army / Panzer Group West General Friedrich Dollmann (until 1700 hours 28 June)
General der Panzertruppe (General of Armoured Troops) Leo Geyr von Schweppenburg (from 1700 hours 28 June)

Army Troops

- Werfer Brigade 7 (Note: Projector Brigade 7 was equipped with Nebelwerfers.)
- Projector Brigade 8 (Note: Projector Brigade 7 was equipped with Nebelwerfers.)

I SS Panzer Corps

SS-Obergruppenführer Sepp Dietrich

- Corps Troops
  - Heavy SS Panzer Battalion 101 - SS-Obersturmbannführer Heinz von Westerhagen (Note: Heavy SS Panzer Battalion 101 was equipped with Tiger Is.)
  - SS-Artillery Battalion 101
  - Artillery Battalion 992
- 12th SS Panzer Division Hitlerjugend - SS-Standartenführer Kurt Meyer
  - SS-Panzer Regiment 12 (Note: SS-Panzer Regiment 12 was equipped with a mixture of Panzer IV and Panthers.)
  - SS-Panzergrenadier Regiment 25
  - SS-Panzergrenadier Regiment 26
  - SS-Panzer Artillery Regiment 12
  - SS-Reconnaissance Battalion 12
  - SS-Anti-Tank Battalion 12
  - SS-Projector Battalion 12
  - SS-Anti-Aircraft Battalion 12
  - SS-Panzer Pioneer Battalion 12
- 1st SS Panzer Division Leibstandarte SS Adolf Hitler (Note: The vanguard of the LSSAH, Kampfgruppe Frey, arrived at the front on 27 June and was attached to the 12th SS Panzer.) - SS-Obersturmbannführer Albert Frey
  - battlegroup Frey
    - SS-Panzergrenadier Regiment 3 (elements)
    - SS-Panzergrenadier Regiment 4 (elements)
- 21st Panzer Division - Generalmajor Edgar Feuchtinger
  - One battlegroup (Note: One battlegroup of the 21st Panzer Division, based around a tank battalion. The battalion was equipped with a mixture of Panzer IV's and Sturmgeschütz assault guns.)
- Panzer-Lehr-Division (elements) - Generalleutnant Fritz Bayerlein (Note: The Panzer-Lehr-Division was equipped with a mixture of Panzer IV and Panther medium tanks.)
- 2nd SS Panzer Division Das Reich - SS-Obersturmbannführer Otto Weidinger (Note: Battlegroup Weidinger arrived at the front on 27 June and was attached to the Panzer-Lehr-Division. On 29 June the battlegroup was transferred to II SS Corps.)
  - Battlegroup Weidinger
  - 1st Battalion, 4th SS Panzer-Grenadier Regiment "Der Führer"
  - 14th, 15th and 16th (Support) Companies, 4th SS Panzer-Grenadier Regiment "Der Führer"
  - 1st Battalion, 3rd SS Panzer-Grenadier Regiment "Deutschland"

II SS Panzer Corps

SS-Obergruppenführer Paul Hausser (until morning of 29 June)
SS-Obergruppenführer Willi Bittrich (from morning of 29 June)

- 9th SS Panzer Division Hohenstaufen - SS-Standartenführer Thomas Müller (Note: The 9th SS Panzer Division was equipped with a mixture of Panzer IV, Panthers and assault guns.)
  - SS-Panzer Regiment 9
  - SS-Panzergrenadier Regiment 19
  - SS-Panzergrenadier Regiment 20
  - SS-Panzer Artillery Regiment 9
  - SS-Reconnaissance Battalion 9
  - SS-Anti-Tank Battalion 9
  - SS-Anti-Aircraft Battalion 9
  - SS-Panzer Pioneer Battalion 9
- 10th SS Panzer Division Frundsberg - SS-Oberführer Heinz Harmel (Note: The 10th SS Panzer Division was equipped with a mixture of Panzer IV and assault guns.)
  - SS-Panzer Regiment 10
  - SS-Panzergrenadier Regiment 21
  - SS-Panzergrenadier Regiment 22
  - SS-Panzer Artillery Regiment 10
  - SS-Reconnaissance Battalion 10
  - SS-Anti-Aircraft Battalion 10
  - SS-Panzer Pioneer Battalion 10

III Anti-Aircraft Corps

General der Flakartillerie Wolfgang Pickert

- 4th Anti-Aircraft Regiment (88mm Anti-Aircraft and other guns)

XLVII Panzer Corps

- 2nd Panzer Division (elements) (Note: The 2nd Panzer Division was equipped with Panthers.)
  - One battlegroup based around a tank battalion

== See also ==
- List of orders of battle

== Bibliography ==
- Clark, Lloyd (2004). Operation Epsom. Battle Zone Normandy. The History Press Ltd. ISBN 0-7509-3008-X.
- Richard Doherty, Hobart's 79th Armoured Division at War: Invention, Innovation and Inspiration, Barnsley: Pen & Sword, 2011, ISBN 978-1-84884-398-1.
- Dunphie, Christopher (2005). The Pendulum of Battle: Operation Goodwood - July 1944. Leo Cooper Ltd. ISBN 978-1-84415-278-0.
- Maj-Gen H. Essame, The 43rd Wessex Division at War 1944–45, London: William Clowes, 1952.
- fireandfury.com. "43rd (Wessex) Infantry Division at Hill 112, 10th July 1944" (PDF).
- Ford, Ken (2004). Caen 1944: Montgomery's Breakout Attempt. Osprey Publishing. ISBN 1-84176-625-9.
- Fortin, Ludovic (2004). British Tanks In Normandy. Histoire & Collections. ISBN 2-915239-33-9.
- Forty, George (2004). Villers Bocage. Battle Zone Normandy. Sutton Publishing. ISBN 0-7509-3012-8.
- Jackson, G. S. (2006) [1945]. 8 Corps: Normandy to the Baltic. MLRS Books. ISBN 978-1-905696-25-3.
- Lt-Col H.F. Joslen, Orders of Battle, United Kingdom and Colonial Formations and Units in the Second World War, 1939–1945, London: HM Stationery Office, 1960/Uckfield: Naval & Military Press, 2003, ISBN 1-843424-74-6.
- Lt-Gen H.G. Martin, The History of the Fifteenth Scottish Division 1939–1945, Edinburgh: Blackwood, 1948/Uckfield: Naval & Military Press, 2014, ISBN 978-1-78331-085-2.
- Kemsley, Captain W.; Riesco, Captain M. "The Scottish Lion on Patrol: Being the story of the 15th Scottish Reconnaissance Regiment 1943-1946". Archived from the original on 24 July 2011.
- Capt the Earl of Rosse & Col E.R. Hill, The Story of the Guards Armoured Division, London: Geoffrey Bles, 1956/Barnsley: Pen & Sword, 2017, ISBN 978-1-52670-043-8.
- Tim Saunders, Battleground Europe: Operation Epsom: Normandy, June 1944, Barnsley: Pen & Sword, 2003, ISBN 0-85052-954-9.
- Meyer, Hubert (2005). 12th SS: The History of the Hitler Youth Panzer Division Volume I. Stackpole Books. ISBN 0-8117-3198-7.
- Don Neal, Guns and Bugles: The Story of the 6th Bn KSLI – 181st Field Regiment RA 1940–1946, Studley: Brewin, 2001, ISBN 1-85858-192-3.
- Paterson, Ian A. "History of the British 7th Armoured Division: Artillery Regiments That Served With The 7th Armoured Division". Archived from the original on 14 August 2007.
- Reid, Brian (2005). No Holding Back. Robin Brass Studio. ISBN 1-896941-40-0.
- Reynolds, Michael (2002). Sons of the Reich: The History of II SS Panzer Corps in Normandy, Arnhem, the Ardennes and on the Eastern Front. Casemate Publishers and Book Distributors. ISBN 0-9711709-3-2.
- Wilmot, Chester; McDevitt, Christopher Daniel (1997) [1952]. The Struggle For Europe. Wordsworth Editions Ltd. ISBN 1-85326-677-9.
- Zetterling, Niklas (2000). Normandy 1944, German Military Organization, Combat Power and Organizational Effectiveness. J.J. Fedorowicz Publishing, Inc. ISBN 0-921991-56-8.
