= 8th Army Group Royal Artillery =

- Royal Artillery cap badge
- Active: 1 May 1943–20 November 1945
- Country: United Kingdom
- Branch: British Army
- Role: Artillery headquarters
- Garrison/HQ: Woodbridge, Suffolk
- Engagements: Operation Overlord; Operation Epsom; Operation Jupiter; Operation Greenline; Operation Goodwood; Operation Spring; Operation Bluecoat; Operation Grouse; Operation Guildford; Operation Plunder

Commanders
- Notable commanders: Brigadier Archibald Campbell of Achalader, DSO, OBE

8th Army Group Royal Artillery (8 AGRA) was a brigade-sized formation organised by Britain's Royal Artillery (RA) during World War II to command medium and heavy guns. It served in the campaign in North West Europe, participating in the battles in the Orne valley and the bocage south of Caumont before the breakout from the Normandy beachhead, operations to close up to the Maas, and the assault crossing of the Rhine (Operation Plunder).

== Background ==
The need for a higher organisational command structure for medium and heavy artillery became apparent during the Battle of France and the early part of the Western Desert Campaign. The Army Group Royal Artillery (AGRA) concept was developed during Exercise 'Bumper' held in the UK in 1941, organised by the commander of Home Forces, General Alan Brooke (himself a Gunner) with Lt-Gen Bernard Montgomery as chief umpire. This large anti-invasion exercise tested many of the tactical concepts that would be used by the British Army in the latter stages of the war. The gunnery tacticians developed the AGRAs as powerful artillery brigades, usually comprising three or four medium regiments and one heavy regiment, which could be rapidly moved about the battlefield, and had the punch to destroy enemy artillery with counter-battery (CB) fire. AGRAs were provided to field armies at a scale of about one per Army corps. AGRAs were improvised until 26 November 1942, when they were officially sanctioned, to consist of a commander (CAGRA) and staff to control non-divisional artillery. They proved their worth in the Tunisian campaign.

== Organisation ==
8 AGRA was formed on 1 May 1943 at Brandeston Hall, Woodbridge, Suffolk, from the Headquarters, RA, of 54th (East Anglian) Infantry Division, which was being broken up. It was assigned to 21st Army Group being formed for the planned invasion of Normandy (Operation Overlord). At the time its organisation was as follows:

- 177th Field Regiment – redesignated 25th Field Regiment 14 March 1943
- 15th Medium Regiment – transferred to 2 Canadian AGRA May 1944
- 61st Carnarvon & Denbigh (Yeomanry) Medium Regiment
- 63rd (Midland) Medium Regiment
- 77th (Duke of Lancaster's Own Yeomanry) Medium Regiment
- 53rd Heavy Regiment

By the time of the Normandy landings, medium regiments were equipped with the 5.5-inch gun (two 8-gun batteries), heavy regiments with 155 mm guns and 7.2-inch howitzers (two 4-gun batteries of each). In the field they were often supplemented by 3.7-inch heavy anti-aircraft (HAA) guns from the AA brigades who had few air targets. Although AGRAs were 'Army Troops', 8 AGRA primarily supported VIII Corps

== Service ==
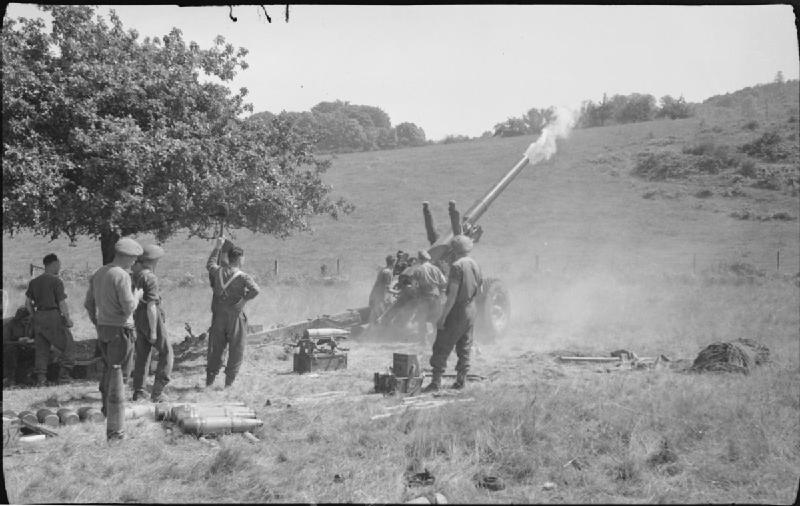
A 5.5-inch gun firing in Normandy, 1944.

=== Operation Overlord ===
HQ 8 AGRA landed at Arromanches on 18 June and it fought through the subsequent campaign under the command of Brigadier Archibald Campbell of Achalader, DSO, OBE (previously Commander, RA, of 47th (London) Infantry Division). It was accompanied by C flight, 652 Air Observation Post Squadron, and set up at Sainte-Croix-Grand-Tonne to prepare for the forthcoming Operation Epsom. It was to have the following organisation for most of the campaign:

- 25th Fd Rgt – arrived 18 June
- 61st (C&DY) Med Rgt – arrived 2 July'
- 63rd (M) Med Rgt – arrived 2 July
- 77th (DLOY) Med Rgt– arrived 18 June
- 146th (Pembroke & Cardiganshire Yeomanry) Med Rgt – arrived 15 July
- 53rd Hvy Rgt – arrived 18 June
- 116 Company Royal Army Service Corps

=== Operation Epsom ===
Epsom was launched on 26 June. Phase 1 of the fireplan, which included neighbouring divisional artillery and AGRAs, was to support the attack by 15th (Scottish) Infantry Division with a creeping barrage of field and medium artillery on a frontage of 4,000 yards (3,700 m) advancing to a depth of 4,400 yards (4,000 m), beginning at H-Hour (07.30) and continuing until 10.16. 25th Field Rgt was directly allocated to 15th (Scottish) Division to support its attached 31st Tank Brigade; it was ordered to deploy as far forward as possible to be able to support the tanks throughout their advance. 15th (S) Division's historian described the barrage opening at H-Hour 'with an ear-splitting crack'. The infantry advanced behind the barrage, though 44th (Lowland) Brigade on the left was disrupted by German artillery firing blind in to the smokescreen, and 46th (Highland Light Infantry) Brigade ran into a minefield and was held up, together with its supporting tanks, and lost the barrage. In some cases the advancing infantry failed to detect and 'mop up' some of the defenders from 12th SS Pioneer Battalion, who emerged from their trenches to fire into the backs of the infantry. When 25th Field Rgt reached its forward position and began to deploy, it found itself under fire from these parties; gunners of 12th/25th Field Battery had to fight a ground action with tank support to clear snipers out of a wood before the battery could deploy. The other two batteries also had to mop up defenders and clear mines from their positions. 44th (L) Brigade captured St Manvieu, but 46th (HLI) Bde had to fight all day for Cheux and Phase 1 was well behind schedule.

For Phase 2, the exploitation by 227th (Highland) Bde and 11th Armoured Division, the fireplan involved a series of concentrations between the railway and the River Odon, of which the first 10 were timed (including 68th Med Rgt) and a further 35 were to fired on call from the divisions (involving 68th and 77th Med Rgts and 53rd Heavy Rgt). 77th Medium Rgt was placed under the command of 11th Armoured to engage opportunity targets identified by the division's ground and air observation posts (OPs). With Cheux still not secured, Phase 2 developed into scrappy fighting. The tanks of 12th SS Panzer Division Hitlerjugend coming into action prevented an armoured breakthrough. However, the first day of Epsom had succeeded in creating a deep salient into the German lines (known as 'Scottish Corridor'), which VIII Corps endeavoured to exploit over succeeding days, extending it as far as the Odon bridges.

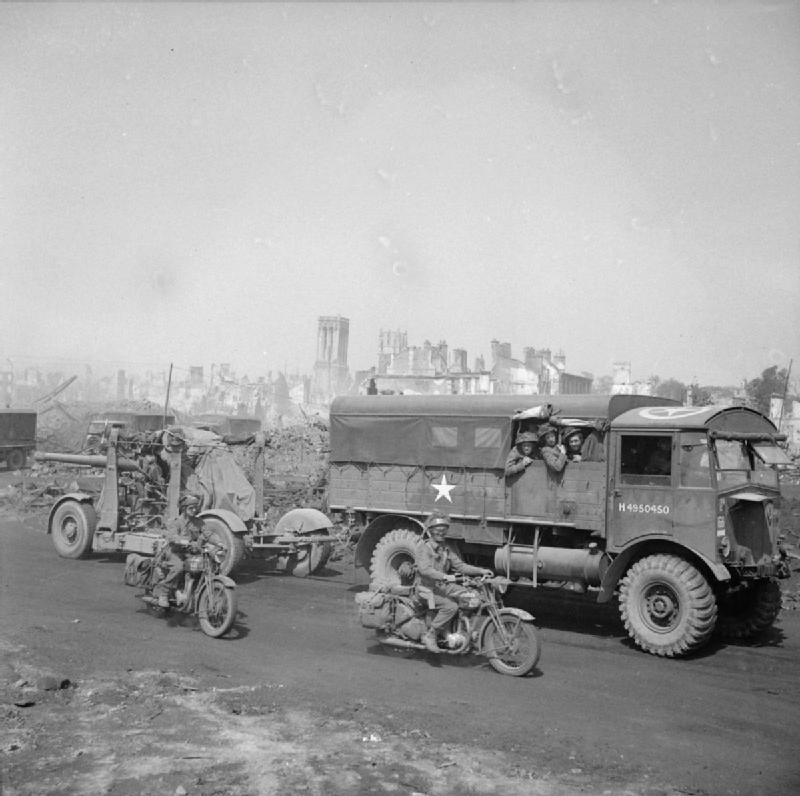
3.7-inch Heavy Anti-Aircraft gun as used by 165th HAA Rgt, being towed through Caen.

When II SS Panzer Corps counter-attacked on 29 June, the attack of 10th SS Panzer Division Frundsberg was broken by the combined Defensive Fire (DF) of 8 AGRA and the entire divisional artilleries of 15th (S) and 11th Armoured Divisions, which caused hundreds of casualties. 165th HAA Regiment fired to suppress German Flak ahead of the Royal Air Force fighter-bombers, and continued firing through the night at woods where the enemy were trying to reform – firing so fast that the paint blistered on the guns. German night attacks were illuminated with star shells, and the artillery fired protective barrages rather than trying to identify specific targets. Next day the Germans could only make probing attacks, to which 8 AGRA responded with some 38,000 rounds of ammunition.

61st and 63rd Medium Rgts arrived on 2 July, deploying at St Manvieu and Secqueville-en-Bessin respectively. 8 AGRA was still short of one medium regiment so it was loaned 72nd Med Rgt, arriving ahead of the rest of 3 AGRA at Sainte-Croix-Grand-Tonne. However, this left on 6 July and for VIII Corps' next thrust (Operation Jupiter) on 10 July, 8 AGRA kept 84th Medium and 165 HAA Rgts, with 275 HAA Bty attached to 84th Med Rgt at Rauray while 198 and 317 HAA Btys were directly under 8 AGRA. The AGRA's tasks were to be CB, counter-flak, counter-mortar (CM) and harassing fire (HF), some fired at extreme range. The aim of Jupiter was to recapture Hill 112, which had briefly been held during Epsom, and the villages of Éterville and Maltot, thus opening the way to the River Orne. It was to be carried out mainly by 43rd (Wessex) Division supported by the guns of three divisional artilleries and three AGRAs, including 8 AGRA. The artillery allocation was as follows:

- 61st (C&DY) Med Rgt to Royal Scots Greys of 4th Armoured Bde
- 63rd (Midland) Med Rgt to 46th (HLI) Bde of 15th (S) Division
- 77th (DLOY) Med Rgt to 130th Bde of 43rd (W) Division
- 84th (Sussex) Med Rgt to 129th Bde of 43rd (W) Division

Each medium regiment provided a double OP with two forward observation officer (FOO) parties to the field regiment supporting the brigade and a flight of 659 AOP Squadron was allocated to 3 and 8 AGRAs. 10th Survey Rgt provided flash-spotting and sound-ranging troops to identify enemy batteries, and 8 AGRA was responsible for the CB and CM tasks, with the infantry's 3-inch and 4.2-inch mortars incorporated into the programme. On 10 July the fireplan began with HF tasks from 01.00 to 03.00, then heavy timed concentrations on all the known centres of enemy resistance began at 03.50. 8 AGRA's four medium regiments fired for 10 minutes on Les Duanes, the first objective of 5th Battalion Dorset Regiment, just south of Fontaine-Étoupefour. Meanwhile 53rd Hvy Rgt was firing a series of 9-minute concentrations on various target with 3 AGRA. There was a separate task table to support the Royal Scots Greys, with 14 targets to be fired on by up to ten field, four medium and a heavy regiment.

The infantry began their advance behind a creeping field gun barrage at 05.00. 10th SS Panzer Division was largely shattered by the weight of artillery directed against it. But the bombardment had failed to suppress the enemy artillery, which opened up on the British infantry's start line. 130th Bde got into Éterville and Maltot, but on Hill 112 129th Bde suffered casualties from 5.5-inch shells (possibly from 84th Med Rgt) falling short, and the Germans sent in a counter-attack by 9th SS Panzer Division Hohenstaufen. A stalemate developed on Hill 112, and Maltot was untenable unless the ridge could be taken. 43rd (W) Division launched a fresh attack towards the end of the day, and although driven back it gained a footing on the crest, which was held against counter-attacks during the night with artillery support. When a company of 5th Bn Wiltshire Regiment got into difficulties later in the day, it was extricated with corps-level fire support including guns of the AGRAs. The medium batteries moved forward to keep them within range of the battle. 61st Medium Rgt had fired 1877 rounds, their highest daily total of the campaign, and 77th Med Rgt had fired 22 full regimental concentrations. Fighting continued next day, and the infantry had to withdraw from the crest onto the reverse slope: the top of the ridge became a No man's land that neither side could occupy. However, the artillery support ensured that German counter-attacks could not succeed. Casualties had been heavy among the British artillery's OPs and command posts.

=== Operation Greenline ===
8 AGRA came under the newly arrived II Canadian Corps HQ for Operation Greenline on 15 July. This was a diversionary attack by 15th (S) and 11th Armoured Divisions to break out of 'Scottish Corridor' past Hill 112 towards the Orne. The operation was under XII Corps but II Canadian Corps provided fire support from the left flank. 8 AGRA was deployed between St Manvieu and Le Mesnil-Patry. It still only had three of its medium regiments (61st, 63rd and 77th) and 53rd Hvy Rgt, but retained 165th HAA Rgt; 25th Fd Rgt was still attached to 15th (S) Division. 8 AGRA's medium regiments would be available for CB tasks, but two of them were under 43rd (W) Division and could be switched from Greenline if that formation was attacked on Hill 112, leaving 77th Med Rgt assigned to 15th (S) Division. 53rd Heavy Rgt's 155mm batteries were allocated for spotting by tactical reconnaissance aircraft, while the two 7.2-inch batteries would be used for CM tasks. The Luftwaffe had become more active over the Normandy beachhead, and 8 AGRA was assigned 399 Light AA Bty from VIII Corps LAA regiment, 121st (Leicester Regiment) LAA Rgt, for its protection. The fireplan for Greenline was complex. Phase 1 on 14 July consisted of 43rd (W) divisional artillery with 61st and 63rd Med Rgts firing at targets on the south-west slope of Hill 112 to create the impression of an attack in that direction. In the early hours of 15 July 8 AGRA fired DF tasks for 43rd (W) Division on Hill 112 but the HQ signal office received a direct hit, disrupting communications. Phase 2 (codenamed 'Clyde') was the night attack by 227th (H) Bde towards Esquay, supported by 77th Med Rgt and 165th HAA Rgt among others; 25th Fd Rgt was available for observed opportunity targets. Unfortunately 43rd (W) Division's attempts to dominate the enemy on Hill 112 by fire failed to suppress the machine guns on the flank of 15th (S) Division's advance, an although Esquay was secured, the advance bogged down. Gavrus and Bougy were taken with the support of 61st and 63rd Med Rgts and 53rd Hvy Rgt, but by the afternoon the division was holding off fierce counter-attacks.

XXX Corps now took up the offensive with Operation Pomegranate on 16 July. 8 AGRA (less 53rd Hvy Rgt) now came under XII Corps to support 53rd (Welsh) and 11th Armoured Divisions operating on the flank. Some progress was made but Pomegranate was only a diversionary attack.

=== Operation Goodwood ===
Even before Greenline was launched, 8 AGRA's regiment had sent their reconnaissance and digging parties to start preparing new positions south-west of Caen for Operation Goodwood. HQ was at Vieux Cairon, 61st Med Rgt near Saint-Contest, which, although on a plateau, had good flash cover from enemy observation. 63rd Medium Rgt moved into positions either side of Franqueville, 317 Bty of 165th HAA Rgt deployed west of Authie and 77th Med Rgt east of the town. 146th Medium Rgt had also arrived from the UK and the whole of 8 AGRA was assembled for the first time. It still had 165th HAA Rgt attached, and for this operation was joined by 107th (South Notts Hussars) Med Rgt, which had also just arrived. 146th and 107th Medium Rgts deployed at Le Mesnil-Patry. 25th Field Rgt prepared a new gun area near Beuville with the help of bulldozers and work parties from 71st and 102nd LAA Rgts, only to find that it was out of range, and new positions had to be occupied some 2,000 yards (1,800 m) closer, and all the dumped ammunition moved. The 25-pdrs had 500 rounds per gun (rpg), the 5.5s had 350 rpg, the heavies had 150 rps and the 3.7 HAA guns had 400 rpg for the operation.

Goodwood was to be an armoured drive southwards from east of the River Orne, supported by massed artillery and bombers. The medium regiments had FOOs advancing with the armoured brigades. After the bombers had completed their early morning tasks, the artillery opened up at 06.05, with 8 AGRA carrying out a CB programme. Then, as the field artillery including 25th Fd Rgt fired a creeping barrage in front of the attack, the rest of 8 AGRA fired concentrations on specific targets, with 146th Med Rgt carrying out further CB tasks for 4 AGRA, directed by 652 Air Observation Post (AOP) Squadron, Royal Air Force. In Phases 4 and 5 of the attack, the whole of 8 AGRA switched to firing concentrations in support of the armour. 11th Armoured Division led off on 18 July, followed in turn by Guards Armoured Division and 7th Armoured Division. 29th Armoured Brigade, leading 11th Armoured Division, had two tank OPs from 77th Med Rgt and one from 53rd Hvy Rgt, while 63rd Med Rgt was allocated to Guards Armoured Division. 8 AGRA fired its CB neutralisation and counter-flak tasks as planned and then fired concentrations in support of the armoured without pause until 22.00. The Germans were stunned by the bombing and initial bombardments, but recovered quickly and the attack was held up short of Bourguébus Ridge. One FOO of 77th Med Rgt advancing with 3rd Royal Tank Regiment was killed when his tank was hit. 8 AGRA fired an additional fireplan on Bourguébus at 16.30, and at 20.55 146th (P&CY) and 107th (SNH) Med Rgts fired again to help 11th Armoured's brigades as they withdrew to 'harbour' for the night.

VIII Corps had advanced 6 miles (9.7 km) on 18 July, but otherwise the results had been disappointing and casualties heavy. While the corps reorganised the following morning 8 AGRA fired concentrations on Bras and Hubert-Folie. 11th Armoured Division captured Bras in the afternoon. When 3rd RTR got into trouble, the field artillery FOOs called down the medium guns, whose shells could stop German armour, and two panzers were 'brewed up'. It took until the end of the day to capture Hubert-Folie. Rain made observation difficult on 20 July and the emphasis switched to II Canadian Corps in Operation Atlantic, attacking out of Caen towards Verrières Ridge. At midday the objectives became a 'Murder target', subjected to the fire of two divisional artilleries and three AGRAs (3 AGRA, 8 AGRA and 2 Canadian AGRA): 59 tones of shells in 3 minutes' rapid fire.

=== Operation Spring ===
II Canadian Corps launched a fresh attack on 25 July (Operation Spring) aimed at pinning German forces and preventing them moving west to interfere with First US Army's Operation Cobra to break out of the Normandy beachhead. 8 AGRA was placed under II Canadian Corps on 21 July to prepare for this operation. The regiments crossed the Orne during the night and early morning and the whole AGRA, less a troop each of 77th and 146th Med Rgts left north of the Orne for HF tasks, were in their new positions at Démouville and Mondeville by 09.00, with HQ at Giberville. 25th Field Rgt was placed under command of 2nd Canadian Division and 61st Med Rgt was in support of 7th Armoured Division. 165th HAA regiment was still under command, with one battery allocated to each of 77th and 146th Med and 53rd Hvy Rgts. B Battery of 10th Survey Rgt, RA, and C Flight 658 AOP Sqn were also under 8 AGRA HQ. 23 and 24 July were spent on HF and CB tasks, but VIII Corps HQ was worried about the exposed forward gun positions and provided bulldozers to dig them in. One battery of 165th HAA Rgt reverted to its AA role to counter the enemy aircraft bombing the gun areas.A heavy raid on Mondeville in the early hours of 25 July set fire to an ammunition dump while 146th Med Rgt was firing an HF task. Despite the employment of three AGRAs (Note: The others being 3 AGRA and 2 Canadian AGRA.) the results were disappointing. Although it succeeded in attracting German attention, resulting in an armoured counter-attack, the operation failed to take its limited objectives beyond Verrières and was suspended at the end of the day. 8 AGRA remained in support of the Canadians, firing CB, HF and DF tasks until 28 July when it handed over its commitments to 9 AGRA, which took back 107th Med Rgt. 165th HAA Rgt also ceased to be under 8 AGRA's command.

=== Operation Bluecoat ===
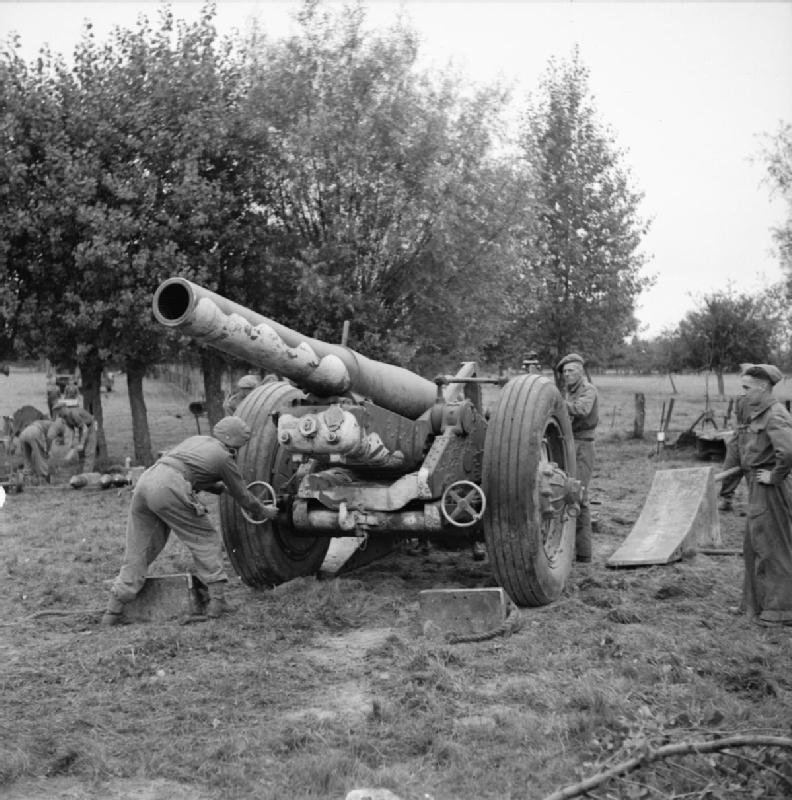
A 7.2-inch howitzer in France, September 1944.

Once 'Cobra' was under way, VIII Corps (including 8 AGRA) was sent from its positions east of the River Orne to make a supporting attack on its flank (Operation Bluecoat). This meant cutting across the lines of communication of the whole of Second British Army. Moves were mainly made by night and VIII Corps' formation signs were covered up, in order to disguise the movement. 8 AGRA moved 30 miles (48 km) from Giberville across the Orne to an area south of Bayeux during the night of 28/29 July, then a further 16 miles (26 km) to north of Caumont during 29 July. Only 15th (S) Division, already in place, was allowed to register its guns; incoming artillery remained silent until H-Hour. 8 AGRA was allocated a flight of AOP aircraft to direct its fire thereafter. Radio silence was maintained until 03.55 on D-Day (30 July). There were fewer guns than normal for an attack by Second Army, and ammunition supply was limited because the 'tail' of the corps was still strung out east of the Orne when the battle began. 8 AGRA assigned 25th Field Rgt was assigned to 11th Armoured Division protecting the flank, with the battery commander of 58th Bty travelling with 8th King's Royal Rifle Corps, the motor battalion of 29th Armoured Bde. 77th Med Rgt was in direct support of 11th Armoured Division and 61st Med Rgt of 15th (S) Division; they also had 63rd and 146th Med Rgts respectively for Phase I of the operation, and 15th (S) Division would have 146th for Phase II as well. 53rd Heavy Rgt was available for CB tasks throughout, and would be joined by 63rd and 146th Med Rgts when they were released from the early phases. 8 AGRA also had VIII Corps' 121st (Leicestershire Regiment) LAA Rgt (less one battery) under its command, with one troop allocated to each regiment in the AGRA.

8 AGRA planned timed concentrations of fire for Phase I of the operation. For Phase II, two medium regiments fired a barrage 300 yards (270 m) ahead of the field guns' creeping barrage, with one medium regiment doing the same for Phase III. Despite the rush with which the operation had been laid on, and tough fighting in some places (at one point the infantry were still 1,000 yards (910 m) of their Phase III start line, so the armour support had to advance alone to keep up with the barrage) 11th Armoured and 15th (S) Divisions achieved their objectives by the end of the day. As early as 11.00, VIII Corps' Commander, Royal Artillery, ordered OP parties of 8 AGRA to 'marry up' with the corps reconnaissance regiment, 2nd Household Cavalry Regiment (2nd HCR), ready to move forwards. Next morning armoured cars of 2nd HCR, probing ahead, found an unguarded bridge over the River Souleuvre and were quickly reinforced. 77th Medium Rgt and the 155 mm battery of 53rd Hvy Rgt moved up beyond the recently captured village of La Morichesse les Mares and the heavy guns opened fire on Vire. The fighting continued on 1 August, the commanding officer of 25th Field Rgt being killed while reconnoitring a new forward position, and 63rd Med Rgt's battery areas were heavily shelled by mortars. 8 AGRA and Royal Air Force Typhoon fighter-bombers bombarded a concentration of German tanks and infantry that had been located in the Bois de Homme, and massed artillery fire helped to break up German counter-attacks. However the battle was quickly moving out of range, so 61st and 146th Med Rgts were put at the disposal of the neighbouring XXX Corps. the situation was so confused that after the cancellation of one target 61st Med Rgt's guns had to remain loaded because there was n safe place to shoot. By 2 August the German front was cracked wide open and units were following up; 25th Field Rgt was mistakenly attacked by US Thunderbolts when it moved up to Le Bény-Bocage. For the advance, 61st Med Rgt was assigned to 15th (S) Division, 63rd Med Rgt to Guards Armoured Division, and 77th Med Rgt to 11th Armoured, and were continually moving forward to new positions.

On 5 August the regiments of 8 AGRA followed the advance as far as Le Bény-Bocage. German resistance was stiffening. Next day the AGRA supported a successful operation against La Buain and Montisangar by 3rd Division. Against light opposition the fireplan was not required, but that evening 8 AGRA fired defensive fire (DF) tasks to break up counter-attacks on 11th Armoured Division. On 7 August, 3rd Division carried out two brigade attacks, supported by units of 8th AGRA, and the following day the AGRA fired in support of 11th Armoured, firing 23 'Yoke' tasks (all guns in the AGRA) against German counter-attacks. By now VIII Corps' offensive had run out of momentum, and the lead was taken over by XXX Corps.

=== Operation Grouse ===
VIII Corps reached Perriers ridge but its advance was halted by fierce German defence and the fact that Allied resources were being diverted elsewhere. The success of Cobra and the developing Canadian Operation Totalize meant that the German forces in Normandy were in danger of being surrounded. On 11 August VIII Corps carried out Operation Grouse to advance towards Tinchebray and 'squeeze' the developing Falaise pocket. This was carried out by Guards Armoured Division supported by 8 AGRA, first with an 'Apple Pie' programmes using airburst shells to suppress flak positions before H-Hour, then with 63rd Med Rgt firing concentrations in front of the advance 61st and 146th Med Rgts carried out CB tasks. In the next phase 8 AGRA would coordinate concentrations by all its regiments (77th Med Rgt was away refitting), after which 61st and 146th would fire at opportunity targets for 3rd Infantry Division and 63rd for the Guards. The Guards launched their attack at 06.30, 3rd Division at 09.30. The attack made slow progress with heavy casualties and ended the day short of its final objectives. Enemy artillery fire was effective, one troop of 63rd Med Rgt being forced to move by CB fire. VIII Corps HQ also came under fire, but the HQ of the defending 9th SS Panzer Division had been located, and 61st Med and 53rd Hvy Rgts were ordered to return five rounds for every shell fired on VIII Corps. Over the following days Guards Armoured Division took up a static role as an infantry formation, but VIII Corps kept up some pressure. 8 AGRA fired impromptu fire plans in support of 3rd Division, with 165th HAA Rgt returning, its batteries initially under 61st Med Rgt then allocated to the other medium regiments. 25th Field Rgt fired CM tasks. By 15 August Tinchebray had finally been captured. Next day 8 AGRA was called on by 11th Armoured Division for a 'Yoke target' (a quick concentration by all guns of an AGRA) but only 53rd Hvy Rgt was still in range. The whole AGRA was out of range on 17 August.

Once the Falaise pocket was closed and the breakout from the beachhead achieved, VIII Corps was 'grounded' at Vire to provide transport and fuel to 21st Army Group's pursuit force. 8 AGRA moved to a concentration area at Montsecret, where it was rejoined by 77th Med Rgt. VIII Corps played a minor flanking role in Operation Market Garden (the Battle of Arnhem), after which it closed up to the River Maas in the autumn. This drive, beginning with Operation Constellation, entailed clearing the Venlo 'Pocket', which took from October to the beginning of December, due to a surprise German counter-attack at Meijel.

=== Operation Guildford ===
By 3 December, 15th (S) Division (temporarily under XII Corps) was ready to take the Germans' last bridgehead west of the Maas, at Blerick, opposite Venlo. Operation Guildford was a textbook operation, employing 21st Army Group's superior resources in airpower, engineering and artillery to overcome the formidable minefields, anti-tank ditches and fortifications with low casualties. 8 AGRA was among the three AGRAs (Note: The others being 3 and 59 AGRAs.) devoted to supporting this attack by a single infantry brigade (44th (Lowland) Bde). The operation was a complete success.

Although held up by winter weather and the German Ardennes Offensive (the Battle of the Bulge), the Allies were ready to resume operations by February 1945. 21st Army Group began Operation Veritable to clear the Reichswald and the west bank of the Rhine on 8 February with the heaviest concentration of fire employed by the British so far in the war. Five of the nine available AGRAs and an AA brigade (Note: These were 3, 4, 5, 9 and 2 Canadian AGRAs and 106 AA Bde) were assigned to XXX Corps for the initial bombardment; 8 AGRA was not among them, but by now 53rd Hvy Rgt had been reassigned from 8 AGRA to 9 AGRA and did participate.

=== Operation Plunder ===
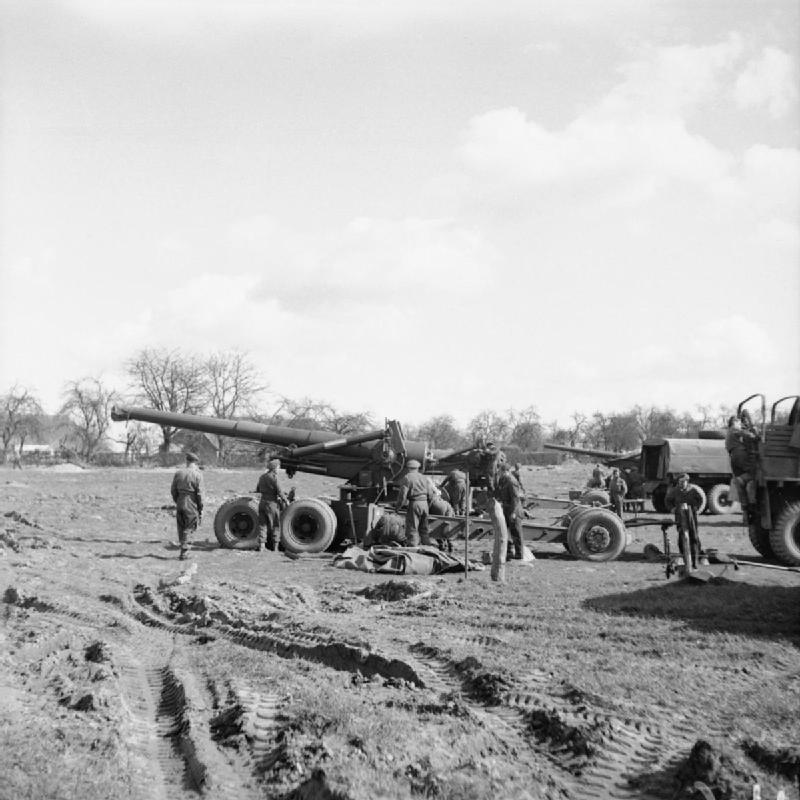
7.2-inch howitzers on converted 155 mm gun carriages supporting the Rhine crossing, March 1944.

At the conclusion of 'Veritable' on 11 March 21st Army Group was in position to attempt an assault crossing of the Rhine (Operation Plunder). 8 AGRA was assigned to support XII Corps for this operation. 15th (Scottish) Division was selected for the assault, 52nd (Lowland) Infantry Division holding the riverbank while the preparations were made behind a massive smokescreen, including parking the guns as close to the river as possible. Of 8 AGRA's regiments, 63rd and 146th Med Rgts were under command of 52nd (L) Division and 77th Med Rgt under 53rd (W) Division. 8 AGRA HQ had under command 25th Fd Rgt, 61st Med Rgt, 53rd Hvy Rgt, and 40th US Field Artillery Group (consisting of three battalions each of 12 of 155 mm guns), giving the AGRA a total of 24 x 25-pdrs, 16 x 5.5-inch, 44 x 155mm, 8 x 7.2-inch guns. It also had C Flt of 658 AOP Sqn under command, one section of which was under the operational control of 25th Fd Rgt.

The fire programme on XII Corps' front began at 18.00 on 23 March with a two-hour CB bombardment (codenamed 'Blotter') arranged by 9 AGRA involving 11 medium, two heavy, one super-heavy and one HAA regiments and the three US battalions drawn from the available AGRAs. After 20.00 'Blotter' continued with the heavier guns but only one medium regiment for a further three and thereafter by the heavy batteries alone until 04.00 on 24 March. In Operation Torchlight 15th (S) Division was to cross with two brigades in Landing Vehicles, Tracked ('Buffaloes') and stormboats, each brigade supported by four medium regiments and two heavy or super-heavy regiments of the AGRAs, as well as the divisional field artillery and three HAA batteries. XXX Corps began crossing further downstream at 21.00, then at 23.30 the 700 guns supporting 15th (S) Division fired their opening salvo of the softening bombardment (described by the divisional historian as 'earth-shaking'). This was followed at 01.00 by the divisional 'Pepperpot' when every available support weapon of every calibre saturated targets on the far bank. Then at 02.00 on 24 March 15th (S) Division launched its assault. While the fighting was going on the artillery carried out bombardments of localities (codenamed 'Climax'), then at 09.30 they began an anti-flak bombardment (codenamed 'Carpet') that fell silent at 09.58 to allow the fly-in of airborne troops in Operation Varsity at 10.00 (P-Hour). At P-Hour 8 AGRA came under the command of the US XVIII Airborne Corps. Generally, 15th (S) Division's assault was successful, but 227th (Highland) Bde got held up at Haffen. A follow-up attack was planned using part of the divisional reserve and a squadron of DD Sherman swimming tanks that had crossed the river. At the last minute there was an erroneous report that some of the tanks were already in Haffen so the artillery support from the AGRAs was cancelled. Nevertheless, the area was largely cleared by nightfall. German counter-attacks came in against Mehr during the night, and the dangerous decision was made to use the medium guns for defensive fire close to the Scottish positions, then in the woods and close to the bridges over the River Issel where the Germans had retreated. The enemy was finally driven out of the riverside villages by 07.00 next morning and at 07.30 15th (S) Division began moving inland to the Issel. That day 25th Fd Rgt came under the command of British 6th Airborne Division but 8 AGRA's detached medium regiments returned.

=== Germany ===
Once the Rhine had been crossed 21st Army Group began a rapid advance across northern Germany. Apart from the crossing of the River Elbe (Operation Enterprise) there were few setpiece operations and little call for medium or heavy artillery. Increasingly, as Victory in Europe (VE Day) approached, British units were called upon to act as occupation forces. After the German surrender at Lüneburg Heath this became the role for the whole of 21st Army Group while the troops awaited demobilisation.

8 AGRA was disbanded at Lauenburg, Germany, on 20 November 1945.

== See also ==
- 6th Army Group Royal Artillery – British Army unit
