= 77th (Duke of Lancaster's Own Yeomanry) Medium Regiment, Royal Artillery =

77th (Duke of Lancaster's Own Yeomanry) Medium Regiment, RA
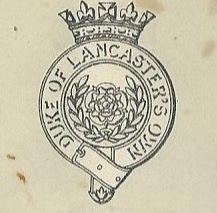
- DLOY cap badge, 1940
- Active: 15 January 1940–25 February 1946
- Country: United Kingdom
- Branch: Territorial Army
- Role: Medium artillery
- Size: 2 Batteries
- Part of: 8th Army Group Royal Artillery
- Garrison/HQ: Manchester
- Engagements: Operation Epsom; Operation Jupiter; Operation Spring; Operation Bluecoat; Operation Constellation; Operation Guildford; Operation Plunder

The 77th (Duke of Lancaster's Own Yeomanry) Medium Regiment, was a Royal Artillery unit of Britain's part-time Territorial Army (TA) formed after the outbreak of World War II from a Yeomanry Cavalry regiment recruited in Lancashire. It landed in Normandy shortly after D Day and served through many of the largest battles of the campaign in North West Europe until VE Day.

== Mobilisation ==
The Duke of Lancaster's Own Yeomanry (DLOY) was a TA cavalry regiment that dated back to 5 April 1798, when two Troops of Bolton Light Horse Volunteers were formed in response to the invasion threat from Revolutionary France. Their successors became the DLOY in 1834. The DLOY saw considerable action during World War I on the Western Front and in Egypt and Palestine. Postwar, many Yeomanry regiments were converted to other roles, particularly artillery, but as one of the senior regiments the DLOY remained horsed up to the outbreak of World War II.

The TA was embodied on 1 September 1939, just before the declaration of war, and the DLOY mobilised as a cavalry regiment in 42nd Divisional Area. While most of the remaining mounted Yeomanry regiments formed 1st Cavalry Division and left for service in Palestine in January 1940, the DLOY was left behind. On 15 January 1940 at Ramsbottom, Manchester, it transferred to the Royal Artillery (RA). It did not receive a regimental number until 15 April when (as most other TA units had already done) it split into two:

- 77th (Duke of Lancaster's Own Yeomanry) Medium Regiment, Royal Artillery at Manchester, with A and C Sqns forming A and B Medium Batteries
- 78th (Duke of Lancaster's Own Yeomanry) Medium Regiment, Royal Artillery at Haverfordwest, Wales, with B and D Sqns forming A and B Medium Btys

The two regiments were permitted to continue wearing the DLOY cap badge rather than the RA's 'gun' badge and a Rose of Lancaster collar badge rather than the RA 'bomb'. They also wore an embroidered shoulder title lettered 'DLO YEOMANRY'.

On the outbreak of war medium regiments were equipped with 60-pounder guns and 6-inch howitzers of World War I vintage (often one battery of each), but a modernisation programme was beginning and by 1941 these were being replaced with the 5.5-inch gun-howitzer.

== Training ==
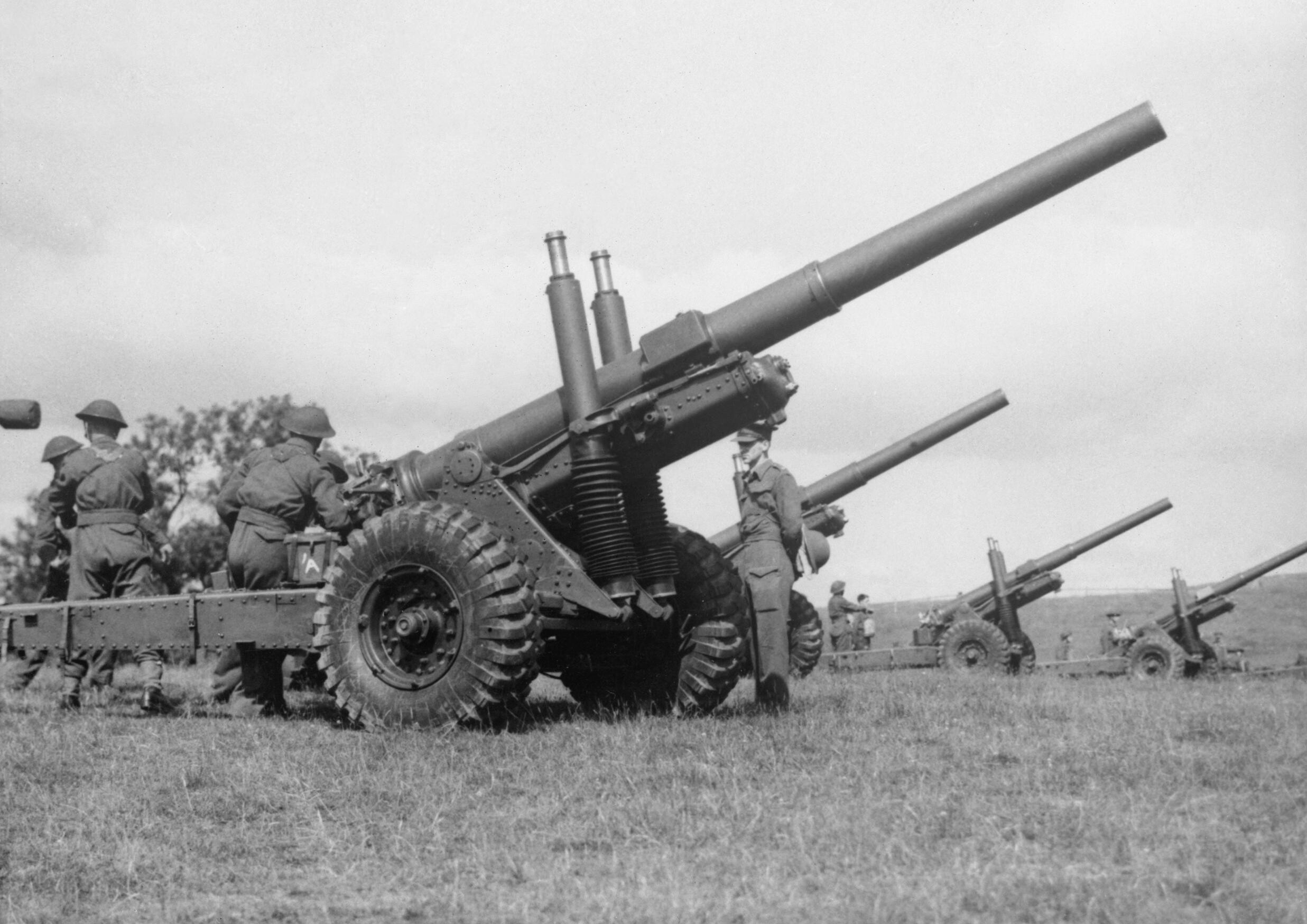
A medium regiment training with the new 5.5-inch gun in 1941.

By the end of 1940 77th Medium Rgt with its signal section was attached to 53rd (Welsh) Division in Northern Ireland and remained there for over two years. Its batteries were redesignated P and Q Btys on 11 March 1942, then 103 and 104 Btys on 1 January 1943. By August 1942 it had its own Light Aid Detachment (LAD) of the Royal Electrical and Mechanical Engineers.

When 21st Army Group was formed in early 1943 for the planned Allied invasion of Normandy (Operation Overlord), 77th (DLOY) Medium Rgt was assigned to 8th Army Group Royal Artillery, which was formed in Essex on 1 May 1943. An Army Group Royal Artillery (AGRA) was a powerful artillery brigade, usually comprising three or four medium regiments and one heavy regiment, which could be rapidly moved about the battlefield, and had the punch to destroy enemy artillery with counter-battery (CB) fire. AGRAs were provided to field armies at a scale of about one per Army corps. By now, medium regiments consisted of two batteries, each of two 4-gun troops, a total of 16 x 5.5-inch guns.

== North West Europe ==
=== Operation Epsom ===
8 AGRA's units landed in Normandy after D Day in June 1944 and supported VIII Corps in Operation Epsom (26–30 June). When II SS Panzer Corps counter-attacked on 29 June, the attack of 10th SS Panzer Division Frundsberg was broken by the combined fire of 8 AGRA and the entire divisional artilleries of 15th (Scottish) Infantry Division and 11th Armoured Division. Next day the Germans could only make probing attacks, to which 8 AGRA responded with some 38,000 rounds of ammunition.

=== Operation Jupiter ===
8 AGRA supported 43rd (Wessex) Infantry Division of VIII Corps during the follow-up Operation Jupiter (the recapture of Hill 112 on 10 July). From positions around Cheux the AGRA fired heavy concentrations on all the known centres of enemy resistance, such as the farm of Les Duanes, first objective of 5th Battalion Dorset Regiment. 10th SS Panzer Division was shattered by the weight of artillery directed against it. When a company of 5th Bn Wiltshire Regiment got into difficulties later in the day, it was extricated with corps-level fire support including guns of the AGRAs.

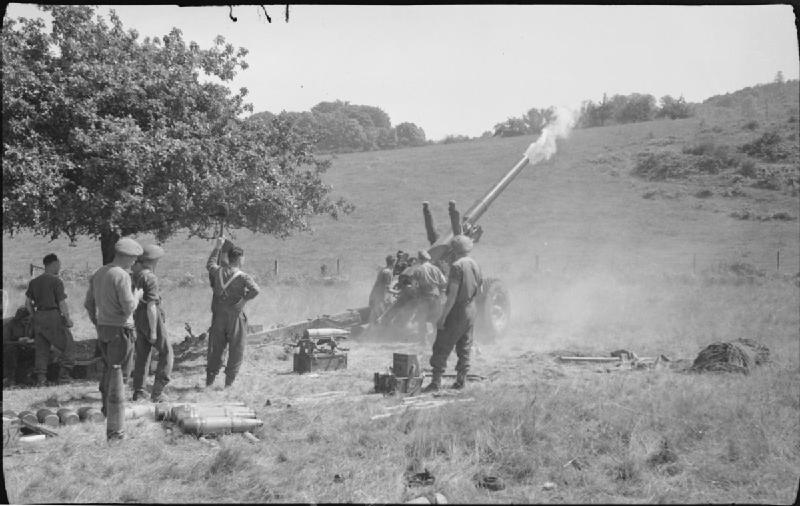
A 5.5-inch gun firing in Normandy, 1944.

=== Operation Spring ===
II Canadian Corps launched an attack on 25 July (Operation Spring) aimed at pinning German forces and preventing them moving west to interfere with First US Army's Operation Cobra to break out of the Normandy beachhead. 8 AGRA was moved to Giberville, east of Caen, to support the attack against Verrières Ridge. Although it succeeded in attracting German attention, resulting in an armoured counter-attack, the operation failed to take its limited objectives and was suspended at the end of the day.

=== Operation Bluecoat ===
Once 'Cobra' was under way, VIII Corps (including 8 AGRA) was sent from its positions east of the River Orne to make a supporting attack on its flank (Operation Bluecoat). This meant cutting across the lines of communication of the whole of Second British Army. Moves were mainly made by night and VIII Corps' formation signs were covered up, in order to disguise the movement. 8 AGRA moved 30 miles (48 km) from Giberville across the Orne to an area south of Bayeux during the night of 28/29 July, then a further 16 miles (26 km) to north of Caumont during 29 July. Only 15th (S) Division, already in place, was allowed to register its guns; incoming artillery remained silent until H Hour. 8 AGRA was allocated a flight of air observation post (AOP) aircraft to direct its fire thereafter. Radio silence was maintained until 03.55 on D Day (30 July). There were fewer guns than normal for an attack by Second Army, and ammunition supply was limited because the 'tail' of the corps was still strung out east of the Orne when the battle began. 8 AGRA planned timed concentrations of fire for Phase I of the operation, with 77th (DLOY) Med Rgt in direct support of 11th Armoured Division. For Phase II, two medium regiments fired a barrage 300 yards (270 m) ahead of the field guns' creeping barrage, with one medium regiment doing the same for Phase III. Despite the rush with which the operation had been laid on, and tough fighting in some places (at one point the infantry were still 1,000 yards (910 m) of their Phase III start line, so the armour support had to advance alone to keep up with the barrage) 11th Armoured and 15th (S) Divisions achieved their objectives by the end of the day. Massed artillery fire helped to break up German counter-attacks over the next two days, during which 77th (DLOY) Med Rgt and the 155 mm battery of 53rd Heavy Regiment, Royal Artillery moved up beyond the recently captured village of La Morichesse les Mares and the heavy guns opened fire on Vire. Within days the German front was cracked wide open.

=== Operation Guildford ===
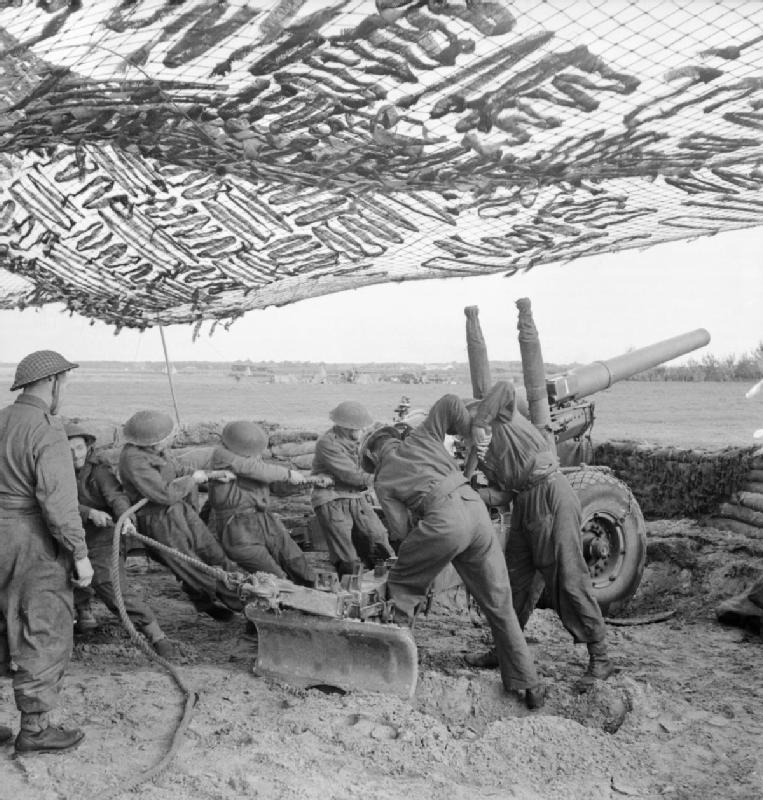
A 5.5-inch gun of 77th (DLOY) Medium Rgt being positioned to fire in support of 3rd Division advancing on Venray, 16 October 1944.

Once the breakout from the beachhead was achieved, VIII Corps was 'grounded' at Vire to provide transport and fuel to 21st Army Group's pursuit force. It played a minor flanking role in Operation Market Garden (the Battle of Arnhem), after which it closed up to the River Maas in the autumn. This drive, beginning with Operation Constellation, entailed clearing the Venlo 'Pocket', which took from October to the beginning of December, due to a surprise German counter-attack at Meijel.

By 3 December 15 (S) Division (temporarily under XII Corps) was ready to take the Germans' last bridgehead west of the Maas, at Blerick, opposite Venlo. Operation Guildford was a textbook operation, employing 21st Army Group's superior resources in airpower, engineering and artillery to overcome the formidable minefields, anti-tank ditches and fortifications with low casualties. 8 AGRA was one of three AGRAs devoted to supporting this attack by a single infantry brigade (44th (Lowland) Bde). The operation was a complete success.

=== Operation Plunder ===
Although held up by winter weather and the German Ardennes Offensive (the Battle of the Bulge), the Allies resumed operations in February 1945 with 21st Army Group clearing the Reichswald and the west bank of the Rhine in Operation Veritable, in which 8 AGRA was not involved. At the conclusion of 'Veritable' 21st Army Group was in position to attempt an assault crossing of the Rhine (Operation Plunder) and 8 AGRA was assigned to support XII Corps for this operation. 15th (Scottish) Division was selected for the assault, 52nd (Lowland) Infantry Division holding the riverbank while the preparations were made behind a massive smokescreen, including parking the guns as close to the river as possible. The division would cross with two brigades in Landing Vehicles, Tracked ('Buffaloes') and stormboats, each brigade supported by four medium regiments and two heavy or super-heavy regiments of the AGRAs, as well as the divisional field artillery and two HAA batteries. XXX Corps began crossing further downstream at 21.00 on 23 March, then at 23.30 the 700 guns supporting 15th (S) Division fired their opening salvo of the bombardment (described by the divisional historian as 'earth-shaking'). This was followed at 01.00 by the divisional 'Pepperpot' when every available support weapon of every calibre saturated targets on the far bank. Then at 02.00 on 24 March 15th (S) Division launched its assault (Operation Torchlight). Generally, the assault was successful, but 227th (Highland) Bde got held up at Haffen. A follow-up attack was planned using part of the divisional reserve and a squadron of DD Sherman swimming tanks that had crossed the river. At the last minute there was an erroneous report that some of the tanks were already in Haffen so the artillery support from the AGRAs was cancelled. Nevertheless, the area was largely cleared by nightfall. German counter-attacks came in against Mehr during the night, and the dangerous decision was made to use the medium guns for defensive fire close to the Scottish positions, then in the woods and close to the bridges over the River Issel where the Germans had retreated. The enemy was finally driven out of the riverside villages by 07.00 next morning and at 07.30 15th (S) Division began moving inland to the Issel.

=== Germany ===
Once the Rhine had been crossed 21st Army Group began a rapid advance across northern Germany. Apart from the crossing of the River Elbe (Operation Enterprise) there were few setpiece operations and little call for medium or heavy artillery. Increasingly, as Victory in Europe (VE Day) approached, British units were called upon to act as occupation forces. After the German surrender at Lüneburg Heath this became the role for the whole of Second Army (later British Army of the Rhine (BAOR)) while the troops awaited demobilisation.

== Postwar ==
8 AGRA was disbanded at Lauenburg, Germany, on 20 November 1945 and 77th (DLOY) Medium Rgt and its batteries began entering 'suspended animation' in BAOR on 4 February 1946, completing the process by 25 February.

When the TA was reconstituted on 1 January 1947, the Duke of Lancaster's Own Yeomanry was reformed in the Royal Armoured Corps as the divisional armoured regiment of 42nd (Lancashire) Division.
