= Michel Bouillon =

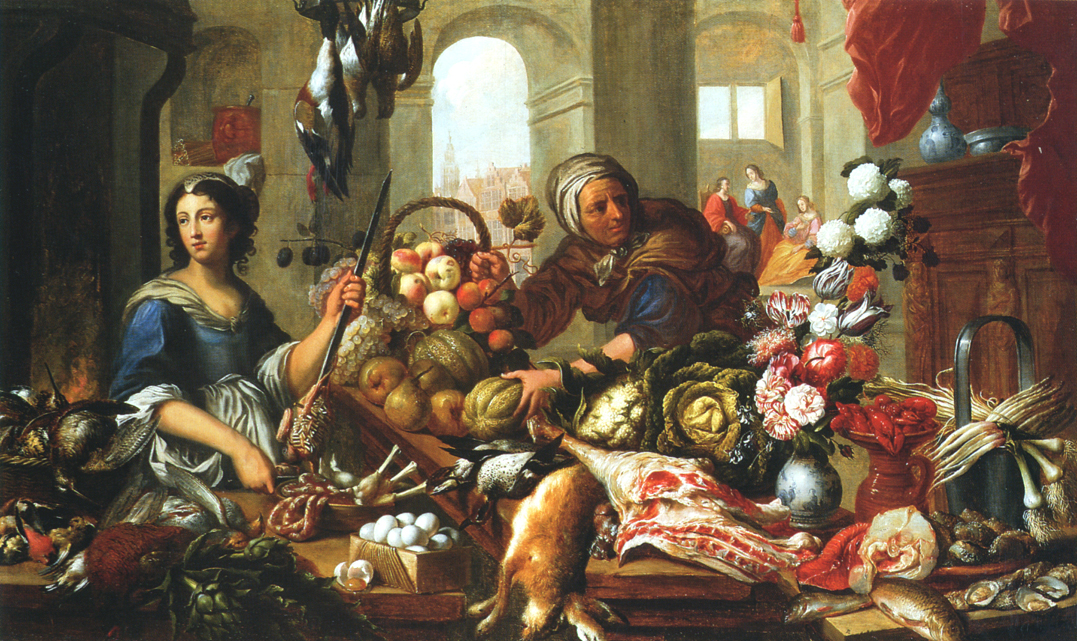
Kitchen scene with Christ in the house of Martha and Mary

Michel Bouillon or Michel de Bouillon (fl 1638–1674) was a Flemish painter of flowers, hunting still lifes, fruit piece, market scenes, vanitas still lifes and garland paintings. His signed works are rare and show the influence of both the French and Flemish schools and a somewhat archaic style.

== Life ==
He is believed to have been born in Ere (now part of Tournai). At the time of his birth Ere was located in the County of Flanders and is now situated in Belgium. Around 1638 he was admitted to the local painters' guild in Tournai. He participated in 1670 in the decorations for the Royal Entry of Louis XIV in Tournai following the annexation of this part of Flanders by France.

He died in 1674 or later.

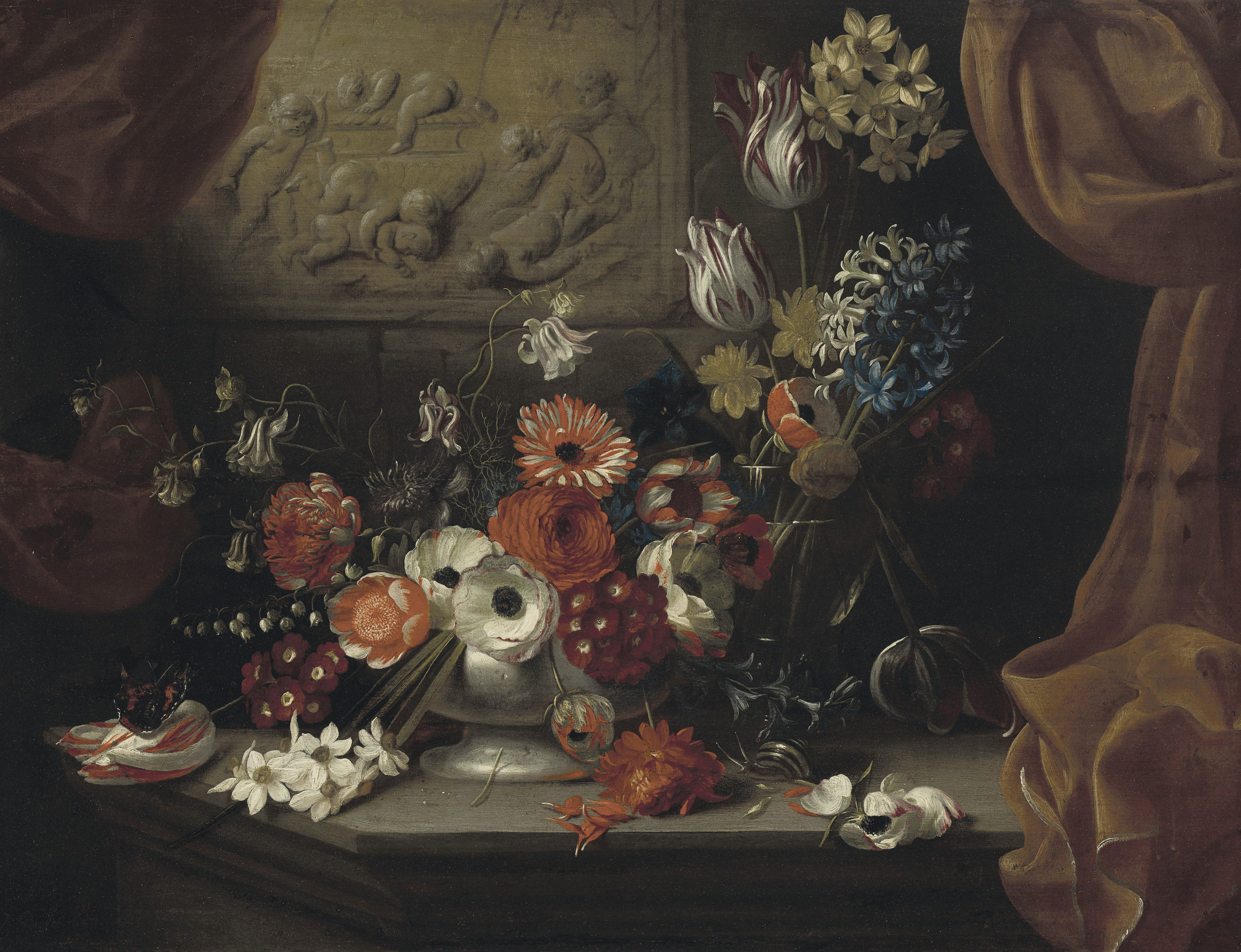
Flowers in a low vase with flowers in a roemer on a stone ledge

== Work ==
Michel de Bouillon's signed works are rare. He specialized in flower pieces, still lifes of fruit and market scenes as well as hunting and vanitas still lifes.

His work shows influences by both the French and Flemish schools. His floral garland paintings around cartouches and vases of flowers presented in a niche are somewhat archaic. His decorative compositions that bring together a wreath of flowers, fruits, games and various objects in an architectural context are linked to the decorative production of the end of the 17th century. In the painting Kitchen scene with Christ in the house of Martha and Mary he is in the vein of painters such as Joachim Beuckelaer, in associating a religious subject rejected in the background, with a kitchen scene with a sumptuous still life.
