= Ere, Tournai =

Coordinates: 50°35′N 3°22′E

Ere (French pronunciation: [ɛʁ]) is a village of Wallonia and a district of the municipality of Tournai, located in the province of Hainaut, Belgium.

The French painter Michel Bouillon is believed to have been born here.
