= Operation Spring =

1944 Canadian offensive on the Western Front of World War II

Coordinates: 49.1104°N 0.3324°W

- Part of Operation Overlord, Battle of Normandy
- Operation Spring
Date	July 25–27, 1944
Location	Verrières Ridge (5 mi (8.0 km) south of Caen), France
Result	German victory

Belligerents
Canada; United Kingdom	Germany

Commanders and leaders
(Canada) Guy Simonds	Josef Dietrich

Strength
2 infantry divisions 2 armoured divisions 1 armoured brigade	Parts of 3 panzer divisions 1 depleted infantry division Parts of two Tiger battalions

Casualties and losses
450 killed 1,100 wounded	Unknown

Operation Spring (July 25–27, 1944) was an offensive operation of the Second World War conducted by II Canadian Corps during the Normandy campaign in 1944. The plan was intended to create pressure on the German forces operating on the British and Canadian front simultaneous with Operation Cobra, an American offensive. Operation Spring was intended to capture Verrières Ridge and the villages on the south slope of the ridge. A successful German defence of the ridge contained the offensive on the first day, and inflicted many casualties on the Canadians.

== Background ==
The districts of Caen north of the Orne were captured during Operation Charnwood (8–9 July 1944) and those south of the Orne had been captured on July 19, during Operation Goodwood, in Operation Atlantic by the II Canadian Corps (Lieutenant-General Guy Simonds) at a cost of 1,349 casualties. About 8 km (5.0 mi) south of Caen, Verrières Ridge blocked a direct advance by Allied forces on Falaise. Attempts to take the ridge during Goodwood had been thwarted by the I SS Panzer Corps (General Sepp Dietrich).

== Prelude ==
=== Plan ===
The attack was to take place in four stages; the 2nd Canadian Division would attack on the west side of the Caen–Falaise road with the 4th and 5th Canadian Infantry brigades after the 6th Canadian Infantry Brigade had cleared the start line by retaking the Beauvoir and Troteval farms and capturing Saint-Martin-de-Fontenay. The 5th Canadian Infantry Brigade, on the right flank, would then capture May-sur-Orne and Fontenay-le-Marmion. The 4th Canadian Infantry Brigade, on the left flank, would take Verrières and then Rocquincourt. The 3rd Canadian Division, on the east side of the road, was to capture Tilly-la-Campagne with the 9th Canadian Infantry Brigade followed by Garcelles-Secqueville. The infantry brigades would have the support of the 2nd Canadian Armoured Brigade. Phase I of the plan required the 2nd and 3rd Canadian divisions to capture May-sur-Orne, Verrières and Tilly-la-Campagne. Phase II, to begin at H+2½ hours, required the divisions to press on and capture Fontenay-le-Marmion, Rocquancourt and Garcelles-Secqueville. In phase III, the 7th Armoured Division was to capture Point 122 and exploit towards Cintheaux and in phase IV the Guards Armoured Division was required to capture woods to the east of Garcelles-Secqueville as the 3rd Canadian Division occupied La Hogue.

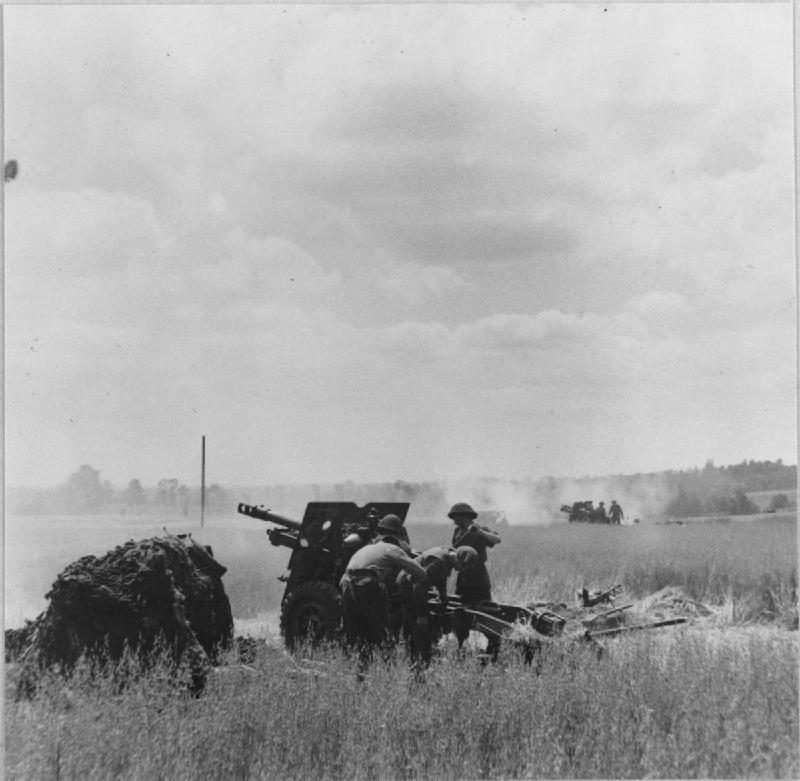
25-pounder field guns in action during an attack on Tilly-sur-Seulles, 17 June 1944.

Artillery support was to be provided by the divisional artilleries of the participating divisions, the 2nd Canadian Army Group Royal Artillery , the 8th Army Group Royal Artillery (8th AGRA) and 83 Group RAF. Twelve field regiments had 264 field guns, comprising a hundred and ninety-two 25-pounder gun-howitzers and ninety-six 105 mm howitzers, nine medium regiments with a hundred and forty-four 5.5-inch guns, two heavy regiments with sixteen 155 mm guns and sixteen 7.2-inch howitzers and a heavy anti-aircraft regiment with twenty-four 3.7-inch anti-aircraft guns in use as ground artillery, a total of 488 guns.

=== German preparations ===
The Germans were expecting further attacks on Verrières Ridge and sent reinforcements. Late on 19 July, a counter-attack against the gains made during Goodwood was delayed until the 116th Panzer Division had arrived, which had been ordered to move by road regardless of loss. At 10:30 p.m. the XLVII Panzer Corps and the II SS Panzer Corps were ordered to send Kampfgruppen (battlegroups) across the Orne. The 1st SS Panzer Division had its normal panzer regiment with two panzer battalions, one with Panthers, the other with Panzer IVs and two infantry regiments comprising six battalions, one of which was mounted on half-tracks. The division had a Sturmgeschütz III battalion and its Panzerjäger battalion had a company of Jagdpanzer IV tank destroyers. The divisions were supported by the artillery of the I SS Panzer Corps, recently reinforced by the 8th Nebelwerfer Brigade. The 1st SS Panzer Division was reinforced by the Füsilier Bataillon 272 of the 272nd Infantry Division and the 101st SS Heavy Panzer Battalion an independent Tiger detachment.

The 272nd Infantry Division was reinforced by the reconnaissance battalion of 10th SS Panzer Division, an infantry battalion from the 9th SS Panzer Division, an armoured Kampfgruppe from the 2nd Panzer Division as its divisional reserve and counter-attack force and the 501st Heavy Panzer Battalion with Tiger Is and King Tigers. The left (east) flank was protected by 10th SS Panzer Division and 102nd SS Heavy Panzer Battalion with Tiger Is, firing from the high ground west of the Orne. The operational reserve for 1st SS Panzer Korps was 9th SS Panzer Division which had two Kampfgruppen south of Verrières directly behind the 272nd Infantry Division and the 1st SS Panzer Division. Available under OKW control was the 116th Panzer Division, assembling east of Cramesnil and the remainder of the 2nd Panzer Division, south of May-sur-Orne, astride the Orne. British Y service signals interception units discovered on 21 July that parts of the 2nd Panzer Division, the 9th SS Panzer Division and the 10th SS Panzer Division had been sent east of the Orne but the rest of the recent German moves were not known.

== Battle ==
=== Phase I ===
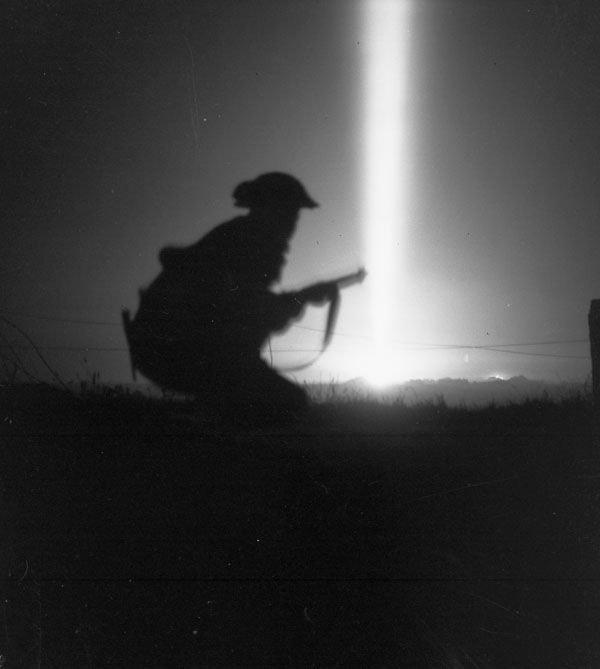
A Canadian soldier near Fleury-sur-Orne during the 25/26 July night attack

On 25 July, at 03:30, the North Nova Scotia Highlanders attacked Tilly-la-Campagne. Simonds had developed a complex lighting system using searchlights reflected off clouds, allowing the North Novas to see the German positions but this meant that the North Novas were visible to the German defenders. By 04:30, a flare was fired by the lead companies, indicating that the objective had been taken. Within the next hour, Lieutenant-Colonel Charles Petch began to move reinforcements into the village to assist with "mopping up" the last German defenders. To their west, the Royal Hamilton Light Infantry encountered determined initial opposition but managed to secure Verrières village by 05:30. At 07:50, Lieutenant-Colonel John Rockingham reported to Simonds that his battalion had dug in on the objective.

=== Phase II ===
On July 25, the Calgary Highlanders attacked May-sur-Orne and Bourguébus Ridge but found that the assembly area of St Martin was still occupied by German troops. Two companies of Calgary Highlanders bypassed St Martin and reached the outskirts of May-Sur-Orne. Radio contact was lost after that and both companies suffered many casualties. Late in the morning, the Calgary Highlanders secured St Martin and then attacked Bourguébus Ridge. After two costly attacks, the Calgary Highlanders struggled to hold onto May-Sur-Orne.

=== Phase III ===
Phase III required careful timing, two attempts by the Essex Scottish Regiment and South Saskatchewan Regiment, had been costly failures. The tank and artillery support did not materialise and the infantry were four hours late reaching their assembly area of St Martin. The Black Watch ran into determined German resistance moving from Hill 61 to the village. When the attack began on Verrières Ridge, the infantry was fired on from three sides, the factory area south of St. Martin, Verrières Ridge and German units on the other side of the Orne. Within minutes, communications had broken down and the Black Watch lost all but 15 of its attacking soldiers. It was the bloodiest day for Canadian forces since Dieppe.

=== German counter-attacks ===
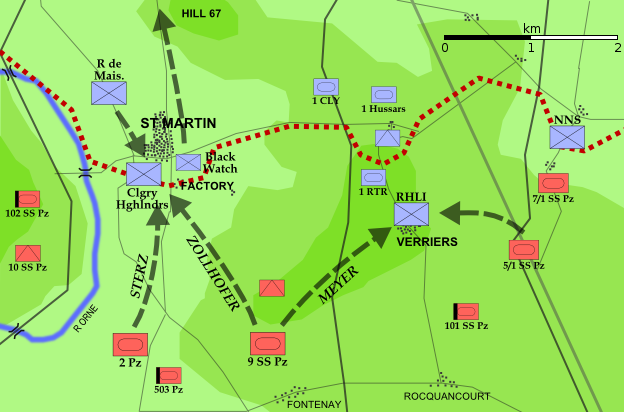
German counter-attacks in the aftermath of Operation Spring

For several days German troops, mainly the 9th and 12th SS Panzer divisions, continued to chip away at Canadian positions gained in Operation Spring. The Calgary Highlanders eventually withdrew from May-sur-Orne and the North Nova Scotia Highlanders were forced to retreat from Tilly-la-Campagne. German forces immediately counter-attacked at Verrières village but were repulsed. Over the next two days, the RHLI fought "fanatically" to defend the ridge, defeating dozens of counter-attacks from well-placed anti-tank gun and machine-gun positions. On 26 July, German commanders declared "If you cross the ridge, you are a dead man" to soldiers being deployed on the southern slope of Verrières. In their holding of the village, the RHLI suffered over 200 casualties. German counter-attacks managed to force the Queen's Own Cameron Highlanders of Canada, Calgary Highlanders and the Black Watch to retreat from May-sur-Orne and St Martin. The Black Watch support company and the Calgary Highlanders suffered many casualties as they were forced back from their positions.

== Aftermath ==
=== Analysis ===
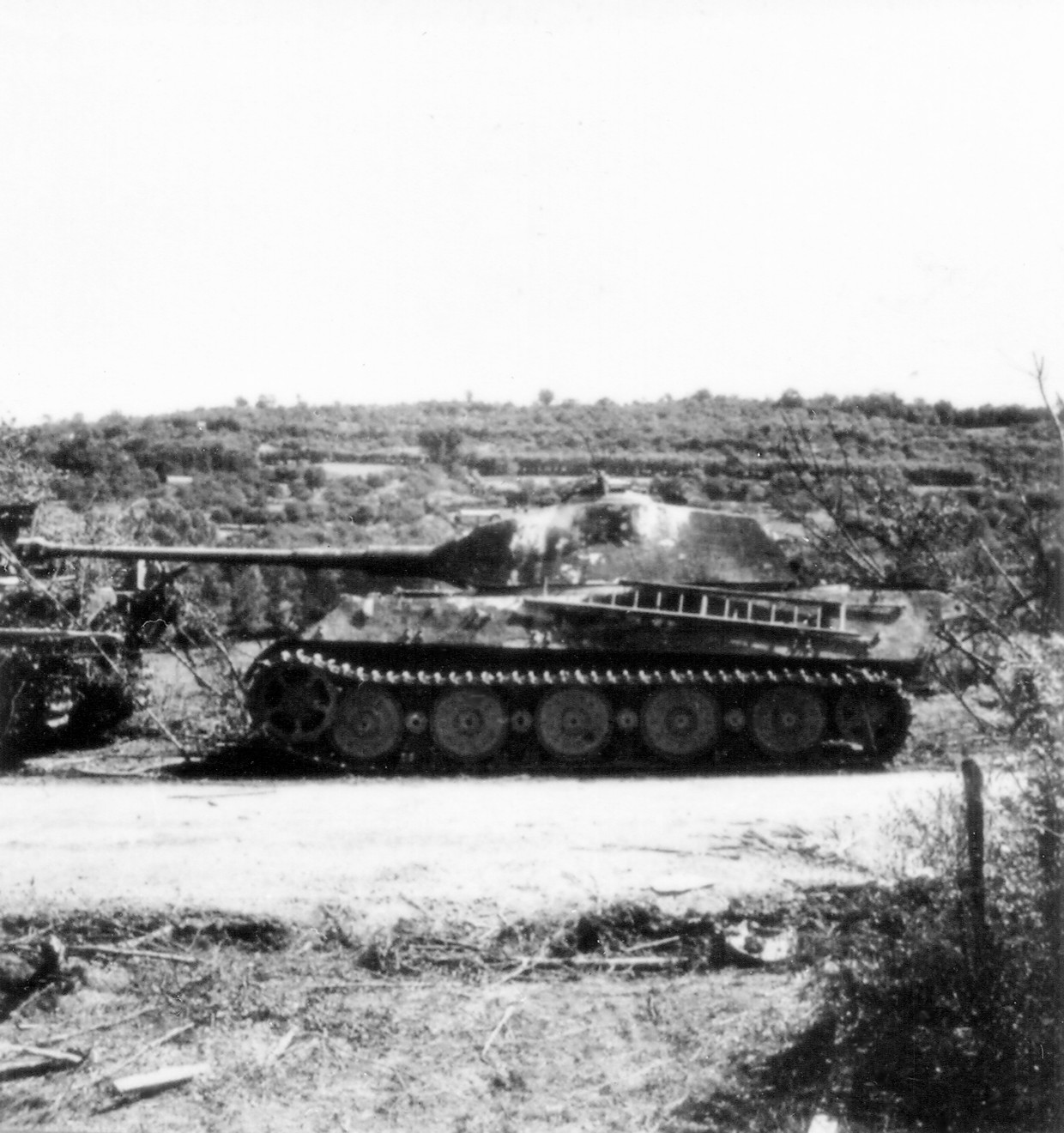
German King Tiger tanks in north-western France, July 1944

The historian Robert M. Citino, wrote that "the Canadian and British troops were instrumental in enabling the US army to conduct Operation Cobra." Operation Cobra began on the same day and the Germans were unsure which was the main operation. Operation Spring was taken to be the main effort for about two days, because of the importance they gave to holding ground south of Caen, before realizing that Cobra was the principal effort and transferred troops westwards.

Operation Totalize and Operation Tractable were launched in August and captured more ground against less opposition. The Official History of the Canadian Army, refers to Spring as a holding attack in that it was launched with offensive objectives but also to delay the redeployment of German forces westward. Charles Stacey, the Canadian official historian wrote, "This vital delay of forty-eight hours the bloodshed in Operation "Spring" had helped to purchase; though that operation certainly did no more than reinforce the already powerful effect of Operations "Goodwood" and "Atlantic"."
