= Verrières, Orne =

Verrières
- Commune
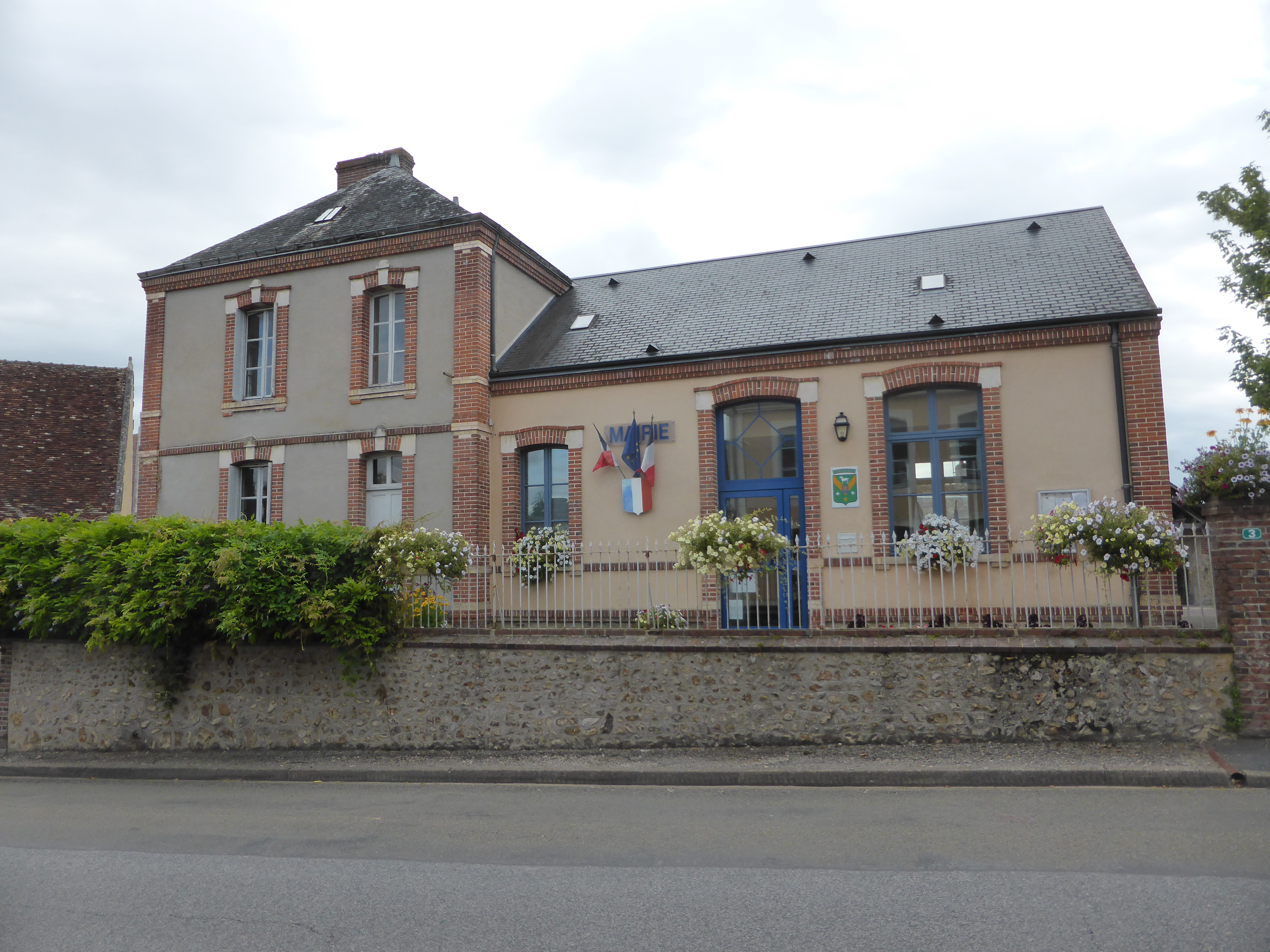
- The town hall in Verrières

- Coat of arms
- Location of Verrières
- Location within France Location within Normandy
- Coordinates: 48°23′30″N 0°45′51″E
- Country: France
- Region: Normandy
- Department: Orne
- Arrondissement: Mortagne-au-Perche
- Canton: Bretoncelles
- Intercommunality: Cœur du Perche

Government
  - Mayor (2020–2026): Jean-Michel Bouvier
- Area^{1}: 17.75 km^{2} (6.85 sq mi)
- Elevation: 130 m (430 ft)
- Highest elevation: 214 m (702 ft)
- Lowest elevation: 119 m (390 ft)
- Population (2023): 408
  - Density: 23.0/km^{2} (59.5/sq mi)
- Time zone: UTC+01:00 (CET)
  - Summer (DST): UTC+02:00 (CEST)
- INSEE/Postal code: 61501 /61110
- ^{1} French Land Register data, which excludes lakes, ponds, glaciers > 1 km^{2} (0.386 sq mi or 247 acres) and river estuaries.

Verrières (French pronunciation: [vɛʁjɛʁ]) is a commune in the Orne department in north-western France.

== Geography ==
A river, La Chèvre, runs through the commune.

== History ==
In the 15th century, the parish of Verrières belonged to the barony of Villeray in Condeau. For nearly a century (1850-1950), Verrières was one of the cradles of horse breeding Percheron.

== Points of interest ==
=== National heritage sites ===
- Eglise Saint Ouen a fifteenth century church, it was registered as a Monument historique in 1975.

== See also ==
- Communes of the Orne department
