= Defence batteries, Royal Artillery =

Royal Artillery cap badge

The Defence Batteries were units of the Royal Artillery created for beach defence during World War II when the United Kingdom was threatened with invasion after the Dunkirk evacuation. Once they had served their purpose they were disbanded or converted into units of field artillery.

== Home defence ==
After the British Expeditionary Force was evacuated from Dunkirk and the UK was threatened with invasion, a crash programme of installing coastal artillery batteries was implemented in the summer of 1940.

Later, as the Home Defence strategy developed, the Royal Artillery formed a number of 'Defence Batteries' to deploy around the coastline for general beach defence. These were not part of the fixed defences of the RA's Coast Artillery branch covering the ports (although it had long been the practice for garrison artillery units to be equipped with a handful of mobile guns, in addition to their primary fixed guns, for similar usage), nor were they included in the field forces under Commander-in-Chief, Home Forces, but equipped with whatever old direct-fire guns were available they freed up scarce field artillery from semi-static beach defence for the mobile counter-attack forces. Most of these batteries were formed on 1 September 1940.

The batteries would have been formed around a cadre of gunners from existing units. For example, 901 (Independent) Defence Bty was commanded by an officer transferred from 135th (East Anglian) (Hertfordshire Yeomanry) Field Regiment, which was defending the Norfolk coastline with a variety of obsolete guns. The 135th also supplied 64 gunners, but these were recruits who had only just joined the regiment.

Most of the defence batteries were grouped into regiments on 4 October 1940:

- 1st Defence Regiment, Royal Artillery, formed at Chelmsford, Essex – disbanded 15 March 1941
  - 903, 904 Def Btys – disbanded 15 March 1941
  - 905 Def Bty – to 2nd Def Rgt 15 March 1941
- 2nd Defence Regiment, Royal Artillery, formed at Saxmundham, Norfolk
  - 907, 808 Def Btys
  - 909 Def Bty – disbanded 15 March 1941
  - 905 Def Bty – from 1st Def Rgt 15 March 1941
- 3rd Defence Regiment, Royal Artillery, formed at Horsmonden, Kent
  - 911 Def Bty – disbanded 15 March 1941
  - 912, 913, 914 Def Btys
- 4th Defence Regiment, Royal Artillery, formed at Eastbourne, East Sussex – disbanded 15 March 1941
  - 915 Def Bty – independent from 15 March 1941
  - 916 Def Bty – disbanded 15 March 1941
- 5th Defence Regiment, Royal Artillery, formed at Steyning, West Sussex
  - 917, 918 Def Btys
  - 919 Def Btys – disbanded 15 March 1941
- 6th Defence Regiment, Royal Artillery, formed at Eynsford, Kent – disbanded 15 March 1941
  - 920, 921, 922 Def Btys – disbanded 15 March 1941
- 7th Defence Regiment, Royal Artillery, formed in Lincolnshire
  - 924, 927, 928 Def Btys – disbanded 15 March 1941
  - 925, 926, 929 Dev Btys
- 8th Defence Regiment, Royal Artillery, formed at Leven, East Riding of Yorkshire
  - 930, 932, 933, Def Btys
  - 931, 934 Def Btys – disbanded 15 March 1941
- 9th Defence Regiment, Royal Artillery, formed at Newcastle upon Tyne
  - 935 Def Bty
  - 936, 937, 938, 939, 940, 941 Def Btys – disbanded 15 March 1941
- 10th Defence Regiment, Royal Artillery, formed at Mere, Wiltshire
  - 944, 946, 948, 950 Def Btys – disbanded 15 March 1941
  - 945, 947, 949 Def Btys
- 11th Defence Regiment, Royal Artillery, formed at Bude, Cornwall
  - 951 Def Bty – disbanded 15 March 1941
  - 952, 953, 954 Def Btys
- 12th Defence Regiment, Royal Artillery, formed at Dunster, Somerset
  - 955, 956 Def Btys
- 13th Defence Regiment, Royal Artillery, formed at Hightown, Lancashire
  - 957 Def Bty
  - 958 Def Bty – independent from 15 March 1941
- 14th Defence Regiment, Royal Artillery, formed at Swansea, South Wales
  - 959 Def Bty – disbanded 12 April 1941
  - 960, 961 Def Btys
  - 964 Def Bty – from 15th Def Rgt 12 April 1941
- 15th Defence Regiment, Royal Artillery, formed at Alcester, Warwickshire – disbanded 9 April 1941
  - 962, 963, 964 Def Btys – disbanded 9 April 1941
  - 964 Def Bty – to 14th Def Rgt 12 April 1941
- Independent batteries:
  - 901 (Ind) Def Bty – disbanded 3 March 1941
  - 902, 906, 923, 942, 943 (Ind) Def Btys
  - 910 (Ind) Def Bty – disbanded 15 March 1941
  - 915 (Ind) Def Bty – from 4th Def Rgt 15 March 1941
  - 958 (Ind) Def Bty – from 13th Def Rgt 15 March 1941

== Field Force ==
By the beginning of 1942 the imminent threat of invasion had passed, the coast artillery batteries were fully established, and the RA required gunners for the field forces. The remaining defence regiments and independent batteries in the UK were disbanded or converted into field artillery on 12 January 1942:

- 2nd Defence Rgt became 171st Field Rgt
- 3rd Defence Rgt became 172nd Field Rgt
- 5th Defence Rgt disbanded, personnel to 172nd Field Rgt
- 7th Defence Rgt with personnel of 923 (Ind) Def Bty became 173rd Field Rgt
- 8th Defence Rgt became 174th Field Rgt
- 9th Defence Rgt disbanded
- 10th Defence Rgt became 175th Field Rgt
- 11th Defence Rgt became 176th Field Rgt
- 12th Defence Rgt disbanded, personnel of 956 Def Bty to 172nd Field Rgt
- 14th Defence Rgt with personnel of 958 (Ind) Def Bty became 177th Field Rgt

Most of these new field regiments served in reserve or holding formations, training reinforcements for units serving in active theatres, though 172nd Field Rgt did serve through the Tunisian and Italian campaigns, and 177th Field Rgt was used to reform the Regular Army's 25th Field Rgt, which had been captured at the Fall of Tobruk.

== Overseas ==
A number of defence batteries and regiments were also formed during the war in British overseas garrisons:

- 16th Defence Regiment, Royal Artillery, formed in Singapore on 24 February 1941 from 10th Mobile Coast Rgt. It was captured by the Japanese at the Fall of Singapore on 15 February 1942.
  - 966 Def Bty (18-pounder guns) – converted from 30 Mobile Coast Bty (or 34 Coast Bty?), Hong Kong–Singapore Royal Artillery (HKSRA)
  - 967 Def Bty, HKSRA (18-pounder guns) – converted from 21 Mobile Coast Bty, RA
  - 968 Def Bty, HKSRA (2-pounder guns)– converted from 22 Mobile Coast Bty, HKSRA
- 17th Defence Regiment, Royal Artillery, formed in Malta on 24 February 1941 from 13th Mobile Coast Rgt (itself converted from 26th Anti-Tank Rgt on 3 September 1939). As Regular Army units, the batteries retained their existing numbers on conversion rather than take the defence battery numbers (969–72) reserved for them, and on 29 June 1941 the regiment was itself redesignated as 26th Defence Rgt. It served through the Siege of Malta and then on 18 September 1943 was converted into 26th Medium Rgt for service in the Italian Campaign.
  - 15 Def Bty – 15/40 Def Bty from 22 August 1941
  - 40 Def Bty
  - 48 Def Bty – 48/71 Def Bty from 22 August 1941
  - 71 Def Bty
  - 13 Def Bty, Royal Malta Artillery (RMA) – formed and joined 22 August 1941; transferred to 5th Coast Rgt, RMA, 1 June 1942
- 18th Defence Regiment, Royal Artillery, formed in Gibraltar as a Mobile Coast Rgt on 1 December 1940 with one field, one medium and one anti-tank battery, and redesignated 18th Def Rgt on 1 April 1941. Regimental Headquarters (RHQ) became RHQ 18th Medium Rgt on 5 January 1944 and the batteries were disbanded on 5 March 1944. 18th Medium Rgt later served in the Italian Campaign.
  - 973 Def Bty – converted from field bty
  - 974 Def Bty – converted from medium bty
  - 975 Def Bty – converted from anti-tank bty
- 805th Defence Regiment, Royal Artillery, was formed in Middle East Forces on 25 October 1943 and disbanded on 30 November 1943
  - A & B Field Btys

In addition, 965 Defence Bty, converted from 36 Heavy Bty, HKSRA, and equipped with 18-pdr and 2-pdr guns, served as part of the mobile coast defences of Hong Kong and was captured by the Japanese at the Fall of Hong Kong on 25 December 1941.
