= Indian Distinguished Service Medal =

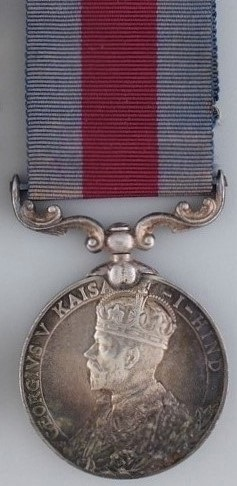
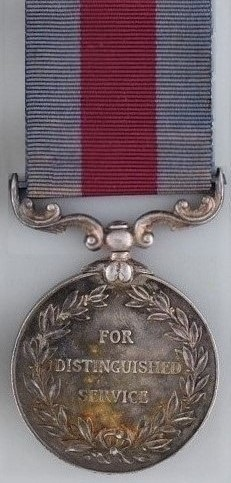
- Obverse and reverse of the medal
- Type: Military decoration
- Awarded for: Gallantry
- Description: Medal: round silver medallion Obverse: profile of reigning monarch Reverse: inscribed 'For distinguished service', within a laurel Ribbon: blue and red
- Presented by: British Empire
- Eligibility: Indian citizens in the armed forces
- Post-nominals: IDSM
- Clasps: Given for further awards
- Status: Discontinued in 1947
- Established: 25 June 1907

Highlights
- Total: Circa 6,000 including clasps
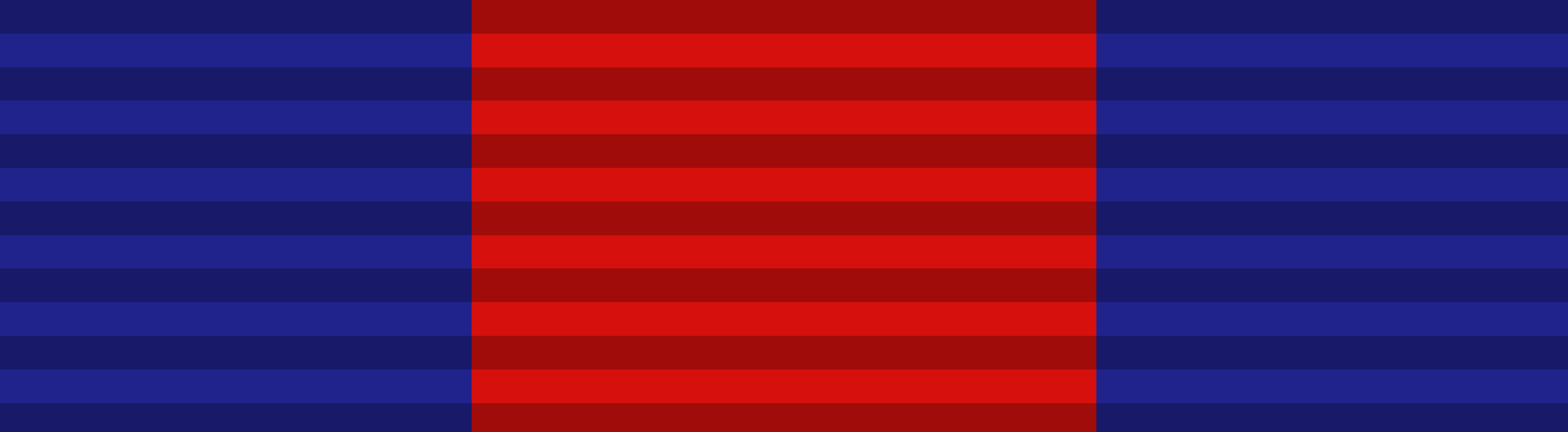
- Medal ribbon

Order of Wear
- Next (higher): King's African Rifles Distinguished Conduct Medal
- Next (lower): Union of South Africa Queen's Medal for Bravery (Silver)

The Indian Distinguished Service Medal (IDSM) was a military decoration awarded by the British Empire to Indian citizens serving in the Indian armed forces and military police. When it was instituted in 1907 it was the second highest award available to Indians, behind the Indian Order of Merit (IOM). However, when eligibility for the Victoria Cross was extended to cover all Commonwealth subjects in 1911, the IDSM became third highest in the order of precedence. It was instituted in order to recognise acts of gallantry that did not meet the standards required of the IOM. The award was discontinued following the partition and subsequent independence of India in 1947.

The medal was awarded for gallantry, both in peace and on active military service. When instituted it was only available to Viceroy's commissioned officers, NCOs and men of the British Indian Army, Indian State Forces, militias and levies. However, after 1917 it was extended to 'non-combatant' followers, such as carriers and grooms. In 1929, eligibility was extended to the Royal Indian Marine and to the Indian Air Force in 1940. In 1944 members of the Hong Kong and Singapore Royal Artillery became eligible.

It is a circular silver medal, 36 millimetres (1.4 in) in width. The obverse depicts the current monarch, while the reverse had the words FOR DISTINGUISHED SERVICE surrounded by a laurel wreath. The medals were issued with the details of the recipient engraved or impressed on the rim, including service number, name and regiment. The ribbon was dark blue with a central wide crimson stripe.

Fewer than 6,000 were awarded, including bars. About 3,200 were awarded during the First World War, and 1,200 from the start of the Second World War to 1947. The rest were mainly awarded between the wars during frontier fighting and other inter-war campaigns such as the Iraq campaign of 1919–20.
