= 177th Regiment =

177th Regiment may refer to:

- 177th Field Regiment, Royal Artillery, Britain
- 177th Fighter Aviation Regiment, Soviet Union
- 177th New York Infantry Regiment, Union Army
- 177th Ohio Infantry Regiment, Union Army
