= Sidi Nsir =

Sidi Nsir is a Tunisian agricultural village in the governorate of Bizerte, the delegation of Mateur, with about 10,000 inhabitants.

In November 1942, it was occupied by the Allies, but in February 1943, the Germans resisted and fought an offensive operation known as the Operation Ochsenkopf (Operation Ox Head) also known as the Battle of Sidi Nsir, and the Battle of Hunts Gap of the Axis in Tunisia from February 26 to March 4, 1943, during the Tunisian campaign of the Second World War.
