= 155 Field Battery, Royal Artillery =

155 battery
- Active: 1942–1943
- Disbanded: February 26, 1943
- Country: United Kingdom
- Allegiance: Allies
- Branch: British Army
- Type: Field Artillery
- Size: ~200
- Part of: 172nd Field Regiment
- Nickname: Glorious 155/ The VC battery
- Engagements: Sidi Nsir

The 155 Battery of the 172nd Field Regiment, Royal Artillery was an artillery unit during the Second World War. The unit was one of three artillery batteries that formed part of the 172nd Field Regiment, the others being batteries 153 and 154.

== Founding ==
After Operation Dynamo came to an end in 1940, the decision was made to place artillery batteries along the British coast to protect the United Kingdom against a German invasion.

By 1942 the need to protect Britain's coastline with Artillery had diminished. At the same time the Royal Artillery was in need of additional field artillery. To meet this need, the 3rd Defense Regiment was converted into the 172nd Field Regiment. In August the regiment was transferred to the British 1st Army to take part in Operation Torch. On January 1, 1943, the troops of the 172nd field regiment were divided into 3 batteries: battery 153, 54 and 155.

== Deployment ==
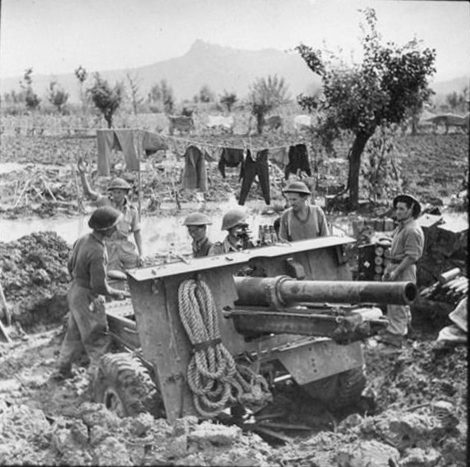
Example of a 25-pounder

In 1943, the 172nd field regiment was sent to North Africa. During the crossing of the Mediterranean, the ship carrying 155 battery was hit by a torpedo from a German U-boat, all weapons were lost, but the majority of the troops survived. Arriving in Tunisia, 155 battery was tasked with guarding a place called "Hunts Gap" in Sidi Nsir, just north of Beja. 155 battery was armed with 8 25-pounders and consisted of about 200 men.

== Sidi Nsir ==
Battle of Sidi Nsir
- Part of Operation Ochsenkopf
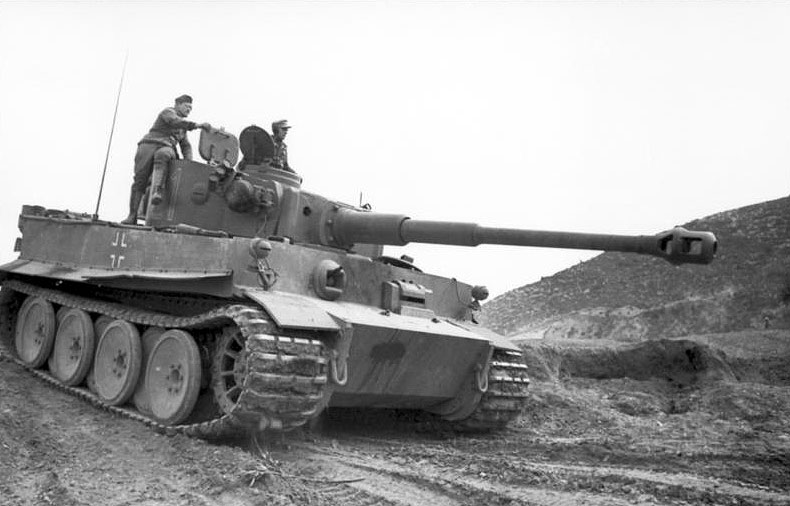
Date	26 February
Location	Sidi Nsir
Result	German victory

Belligerents
United Kingdom	Nazi Germany

Commanders and leaders
United Kingdom J. S. Raworth	Nazi Germany Rudolf Lang

Strength
500 troops and 8 25-pounders	13.000 troops, 77 tanks and 8 fighters

Operation Ochsenkopf began on February 26. This was an Axis operation in which several targets were attacked at the same time. One of the attacks was an attack on Sidi Nsir where 155 battery was stationed. Sidi Nsir was defended by 155 Battery with support from the 5th battalion of the Hampshire Regiment, about 500 men in total. The German attackers had about 13,000 infantry and 77 tanks at their disposal.

In the early morning German mortars began to fall on the guns of 155 battery. After the mortar attack the Germans attacked with tanks, the tanks drove towards 155 battery via a road called Mateur. One of the 25-pounders of 155 battery was able to fire over open sights at this tank column, so the tanks had to swerve and they got stuck in a minefield. The tanks suffered damage and had to retreat.

Around 11 o'clock the Germans attempted another attack, this time from the left flank. Part of 155 battery noticed the attack and managed to knock out four tanks, after which the Germans had to break off the attack again. Around noon the Germans were again preparing for an attack, but this was called off.

At 13 o'clock another attack by the Germans began. The Germans attacked from two sides with about 30 tanks and infantry. The observation post that was supposed to control the artillery was overrun and the telephone lines were destroyed. The battery was attacked from the air by Messerschmitt Bf 109 fighters, these attacks caused fire in the ammunition trucks, which made it difficult to resupply the guns

At 15:00 the Germans attacked with a column of tanks led by a Tiger supported by infantry, while other tanks fired from a distance. The first three tanks were hit, forcing the German troops to withdraw and fire on the battery from a distance. By 5:30 pm, all but one of the 25-pounders had been knocked out. Towards evening the Germans attacked for the last time, the only remaining gun continuing to fire until the enemy tanks were within 30 yards. The German tanks drove over the positions of 155 battery crushing the guns and soldiers, the last message the battery sent was "Tanks are on us" and a V in Morse code

Of the 130 men (9 officers and 121 men of other ranks) of 155 battery, only 9 managed to get to safety.

=== Consequences ===
The battle in Sidi was a heavy loss for the British, but the heavy resistance of 155 battery gave other troops time to prepare for the attack, partly because of this the Axis powers failed to reach the objectives of Operation Ochsenkopf.

== Recognition ==
=== Military awards ===
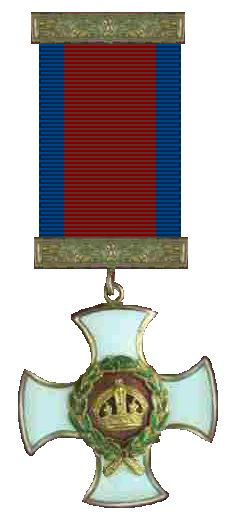
Distinguished Service Order

- Distinguished Service Order: Lt. Col. W. D. McN. Graham – C.O. 172nd Field Regiment R.A.
- Military Cross: Major J. S. Raworth R.A. 155 Battery R.A. (Battery Commandant)
- Distinguished Conduct Medal: LBdr R. S. Hitchin 155 Battery R.A.: Sgt. R. Henderson 155 Battery R.A.
- Military Medal: Gnr. R. Kennard 155 Battery R.A., Sgt. E. R. Lodder 155 Battery R.A., Bdr. G. H. Wallis 155 Battery R.A.
