= 172nd Field Regiment, Royal Artillery =

3rd & 5th Defence Regiments, RA 172nd Field Regiment, RA
- Royal Artillery cap badge
- Active: 4 October 1940 – 7 November 1945
- Country: United Kingdom
- Branch: British Army
- Role: Field artillery
- Size: 3 Batteries
- Part of: 46th Infantry Division
- Engagements: Sidi Nisr; Operation Avalanche; Gothic Line; Lamone crossing

The 172nd Field Regiment was a unit of Britain's Royal Artillery (RA) during World War II. Originally formed to man beach defence batteries in Kent and Sussex, it was later converted to field artillery. It served in the Tunisian campaign, where one of its batteries was overrun and destroyed after an epic defence at Sidi Nisr. It took part in the Salerno landings and fought its way up the Italian peninsula, including the bitter fighting for the Gothic Line and the crossing of the Lamone. The regiment spent early 1945 on security duties in Greece, and ended the war in Austria. It was disbanded after the war.

== 3rd and 5th Defence Regiments ==
After the British Expeditionary Force was evacuated from Dunkirk and the United Kingdom was threatened with invasion, a crash programme of installing coastal artillery batteries was implemented in the summer of 1940.

Later, as the Home Defence strategy developed, the Royal Artillery formed a number of 'Defence Batteries' to deploy around the coastline for general beach defence. These were not part of the RA's Coast Artillery branch, nor were they included in the field forces under Commander-in-Chief, Home Forces, but equipped with whatever old guns were available they freed up scarce field artillery from static beach defence for the mobile counter-attack forces. Most of these batteries were formed on 1 September 1940, and they were grouped into regiments from 4 October.

- 3rd Defence Regiment was formed at Horsmonden in Kent, with 911, 912, 913 and 914 Defence Batteries. On 15 March 1941 911 Defence Bty was disbanded.
- 5th Defence Regiment was formed at Steyning in West Sussex, with 917, 918, and 919 Defence Batteries. On 15 March 1941 919 Defence Bty was disbanded.

== 172nd Field Regiment ==
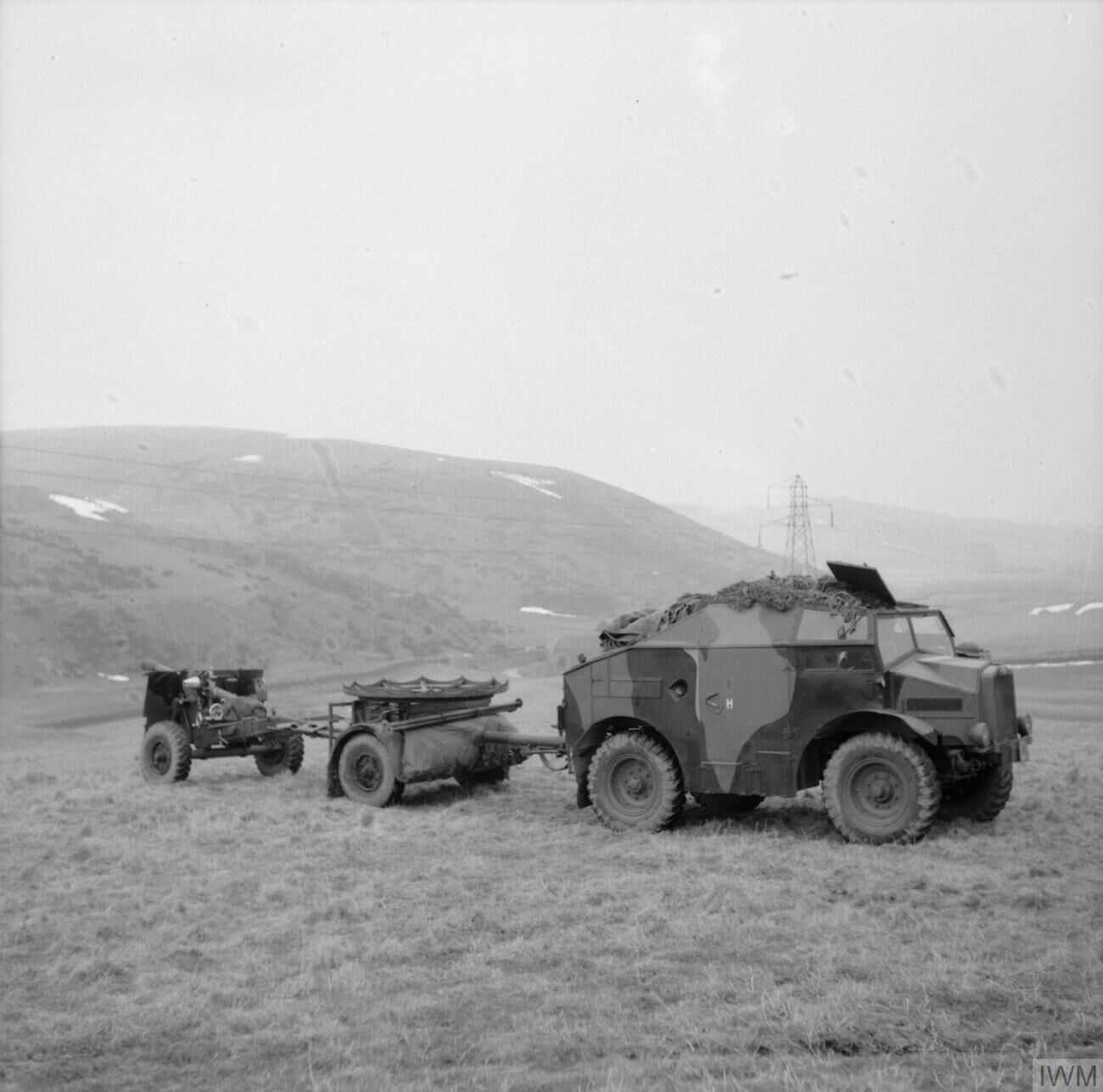
A 25-pounder gun and Quad tractor on a training exercise in the UK.

By the beginning of 1942 the imminent threat of invasion had passed, the coast artillery batteries were fully established, and the RA required gunners for the field forces. The remaining Defence Regiments in the UK were disbanded or converted into field artillery. On 12 January 1942 3rd Defence Rgt at Hastings was converted into 172nd Field Regiment, and 912, 913 and 914 Defence Btys were designated A, B and C Btys. At the same time 5th Defence Rgt and its two remaining batteries were disbanded and their personnel posted to 172nd Field Rgt. A, B and C Btys were redesignated P, Q and R on 11 March. At this period the establishment of a field regiment was three batteries, each of two troops of four 25-pounder guns.

On 11 May 1942 the regiment was assigned to 46th Infantry Division. At the time the division was training with XII Corps in South-East England. However, in August 1942 it was transferred to First Army, which was preparing for the Allied landings in North Africa (Operation Torch).

On 1 January 1943 the regiment's batteries were numbered as 153, 154 and 155 Field Btys. (Note: Previous batteries with these numbers had existed in the Royal Field Artillery between 1917 and 1920.)

=== Tunisia ===
Divisional insignia of 46th Infantry Division.

The Torch landings began on 8 November 1942, and First Army's units and formations were progressively fed into the fighting. 46th Division's 139th Brigade sailed on 24 December; the rest of the division embarked on 6 January 1943 and landed on 17 January, by which time the focus of the campaign was in Tunisia. By midnight on 13/14 February, the division was in the line, holding the sector nearest the coast. During the hurried reorganisation caused by the Battle of Kasserine Pass (19–24 February) the division's brigades were split up, each with its attached field regiment. When the Axis launched Operation Ochsenkopf towards Béja on 26 February 128th Brigade with 172nd Field Rgt and additional artillery support was attacked in the area of Hunt's Gap by Kampfgruppe Lang commanded by Oberst Rudolf Lang. The fighting began at the patrol base of Sidi Nsir, 12 miles (19 km) north-east of Hunt's Gap, when Lang's Panzers fell on a detachment consisting of 5th Battalion Hampshire Regiment supported by 155 Field Bty. During the night, flares began to go up in the hills around Sidi Nsir, and at 06.30 German mortars began firing on the British guns. After 45 minutes German tanks drove down the road from Mateur and four of the 25-pdrs opened fire. No. 1 gun had been specially placed at the top of a slope to cover the approach from Mateur and fired over open sights. The leading German tanks ran onto mines, were damaged and withdrew with the infantry. At 11.00 the Germans made another attempt on the left flank, but F Troop opened fire and hit four German tanks, setting them ablaze. Around midday, the Germans prepared to attack again, but massed British artillery fire broke up the attack before it began.

By 13.00, 30 German tanks, self-propelled guns and infantry had worked round both flanks and were within 600 yards (550 m) of the position. The highest observation post (OP) was attacked, its Wireless transmitter destroyed and telephone lines cut. Eight Messerschmitt Bf 109 fighters strafed the guns, inflicting casualties, and also attacked rear areas. Several of the British vehicles on the road to Hunt's Gap were hit, and ammunition had to be salvaged at risk by the gunners. Bivouacs and ammunition dumps were also hit and left burning. Just after 14.30 German lorried infantry turned the southern flank by infiltrating forward under cover of a hill. At 15.00 German infantry commenced small-arms fire at close range and a column of tanks led by a Tiger moved along the road into the battery position, as 13 more tanks gave covering fire from hull-down positions. 155 Field Bty's gunners switched to armour piercing shot and knocked out three tanks, which blocked the road. At 17.30 another German attack on the remaining guns began; seven tanks were hit but one by one, the guns were hit by tank-gun and machine-gun fire. By nightfall, only one 25-pdr remained in action, engaging the German tanks at close range before being overrun, when the Hampshire's commanding officer ordered a retreat. Only nine men of the battery made it back to the main position; all the 25-pdrs were knocked out by the enemy or destroyed by the gunners when it became impossible to save them. Around 40 of Lang's tanks were destroyed or temporarily crippled by mines, the infantry anti-tank guns and by 155 Field Bty. (Note: After the action at Sidi Nsir, the CO of 172nd Field Rgt had an unofficial commemorative badge made locally. Worn either above the right breast pocket or on the right arm beneath the divisional badge it consisted of a red shield on which a silver sword pierces a German tank, with the word 'BEJA' above.)

The defence of Sidi Nsir gained 128th Bde time to prepare what the Official History called 'a hot reception' for Lang at Hunt's Gap. It had support from 72 25-pdrs (153 and 154 Field Btys of 172nd Field Rgt, the whole of 71st Field Rgt, and a battery of 102nd Field Rgt), 5.5-inch guns of 5th Medium Rgt, and two squadrons of Churchill tanks of the North Irish Horse. A tank-killing zone had been prepared with minefields, anti-tank guns, hull-down Churchills and direct fire areas for medium and heavy artillery, with Close air support from Hurricane fighter-bombers. By 1 March Lang had only five tanks fit for action and was forced to go over to the defensive. Lang's tank casualties had been so high that his own troops nicknamed him the 'Tank Killer'.

After Eighth Army's victory at Wadi Akarit (6–7 April), 128th Bde was part of the force sent by First Army to cut the retreat of the Axis forces, even though Army HQ did not consider it completely ready for battle. As a preliminary to the main attack on the Fondouk Pass, it was tasked with capturing and holding crossings over Wadi Marguellil and then the high ground beyond, which it successfully achieved on 7/8 April. First Army began its final offensive on Tunis (Operation Vulcan) on 22 April. 46th Division attacked with strong artillery and tank support towards some hills near Sebkret el Kourzia in an effort to crack open the position for the armour to pass through. By early May the Axis forces were crumbling, and a final thrust (Operation Strike) took First Army into Tunis on 7 May; the Axis forces surrendered on 13 May..

=== Salerno ===
46th Division was assigned to Force 141 (later 15th Army Group) for the Allied invasion of Sicily but was not employed. Instead it was used to carry out the assault landing at Salerno on the Italian mainland (Operation Avalanche) on 9 September. The division concentrated at Bizerte from its training areas in mid-August. 128th Brigade carried out an assault landing on two beaches between the rivers Asa and Picentino, accompanied by 142nd (Royal Devon Yeomanry) Field Rgt equipped with Bishop self-propelled 25-pdrs. The towed 25-pdrs of 172nd Field Rgt began landing shortly afterwards: one battery in the morning, a second during the afternoon, and the third next day. A week-long battle for Salerno and its hinterland followed, with more and more reinforcements squeezing onto the beaches while the Luftwaffe attacked the beaches and shipping. Finally, on 16 September the Germans withdrew and 46th Division swung northwards towards Naples.

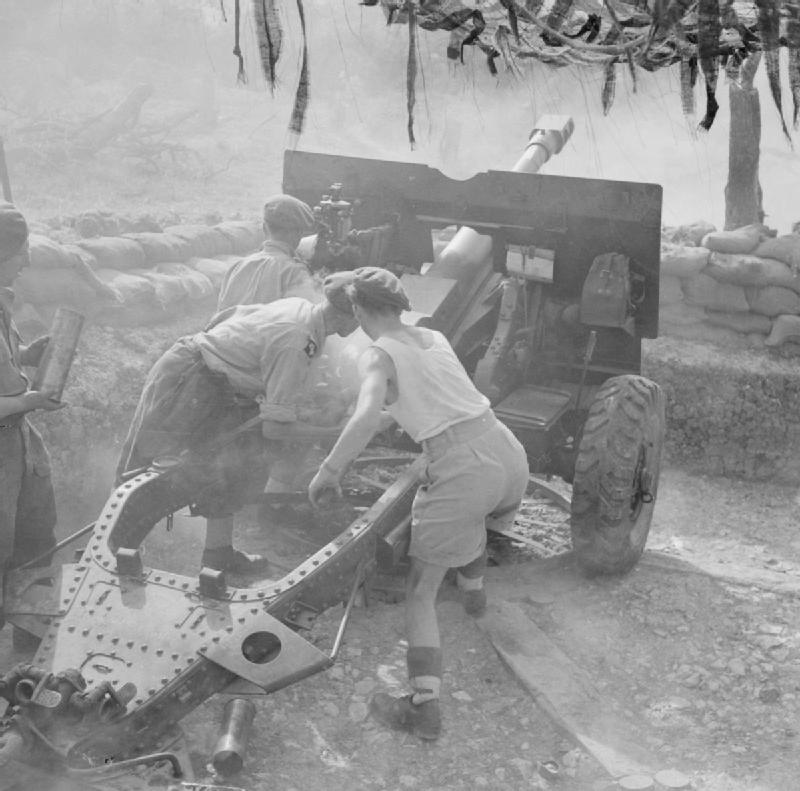
Royal Artillery 25-pdr in action in Italy, May 1944.

46th Division fought its way through the high ground north of Salerno, and then the armour drove across the Plain of Naples to the city itself on 1 October. Next the force moved up for the assault crossing of the Volturno, for which 400 rounds per gun were dumped ready for use.. The division's attack on the night of 12/13 October was almost unopposed except in one sector, and it had two brigade bridgeheads by nightfall on 13 October. However, this was partly because the Germans had chosen to defend the wide marshy area across the river, rather than the line of the river itself. 46th Division next worked its way up the coastal plain past Monte Camino to the German Winter Line. The division's next major operation was an attempted assault crossing of the Garigliano on the night of 19/20 January 1944 intended to assist II US Corps crossing of the Rapido (part of the attacks on Monte Cassino). 128th Brivgade made the assault with the support of the whole divisional artillery, augmented with corps artillery, but the assault boats were swept away of damaged by the fast-flowing river. Afterwards the division was involved in hill fighting between 26 January and 9 February, taking Monte Furlito and Monte Purgatorio but failing at Monte Faito. The attacks were then called off in rain, sleet and snow.

=== Palestine ===
In early 1944 Allied Armies in Italy (AAI) instituted a procedure of shipping exhausted British formations (without their equipment) to Middle East Command for rest and retraining. The first of these was 46th Division, which embarked on 16 March, arriving in Egypt on 22 March and moving up into Palestine at the end of the month. Rested and reinforced, the division retraced its journey in June, landing back in Italy on 3 July and taking over 5th Division's guns and vehicles.

=== Gothic Line ===
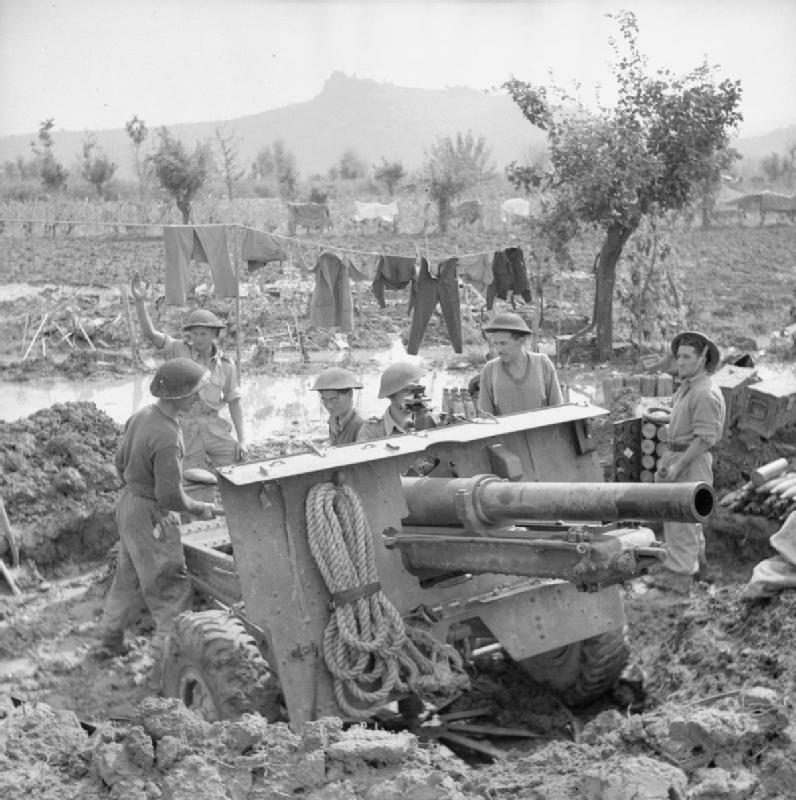
Royal Artillery 25-pdr in a waterlogged position, Italy, winter 1944.

On its return 46th Division joined Eighth Army on the east side of Italy to take part in breaching the Gothic Line (Operation Olive). The initial operations starting on 26 August began well, with 46th Division taking the Montegridolfo village complex on 31 August and then continuing its advance to the Conca and Morciano. It then moved to clear the Croce–Gemmano high ground to protect Eighth Army's flank as it advanced on Coriano, but here the division ran into stiff opposition in the Battle of Gemmano. Only on 17 September were the Germans cleared out of their defences and Eighth Army able to close up to the next line of defences, the Rimini Line. This was taken at a rush by 21 September.

Eighth Army continued its advance to the Savio, struggling as much with bad weather and swollen rivers as with stubborn enemy opposition. 46th Division was now due for a rest, having been in almost continuous operations for two months, and it was relieved in mid-October, though it was back in the line on 31 October. In November 46th Division fought its way to the Montone, for which its artillery was reinforced by that of 56th (London) Division with corps artillery and air support, but the river crossing itself was foiled by the fast-flowing river until the night of 11/12 November. The division was then held up again at the Cosina. After a rest it was brought in December back to cross the Lamone river in a setpiece operation with the artillery integrated with air support. It then advanced towards Faenza, but on 9 December it was heavily counter-attacked. The 'gun duel' was the heaviest 46th Divisional artillery had ever faced, but 138th Bde held off the attack with massive support from all the corps artillery.

=== Greece ===
46th Division was now exhausted from the winter fighting and was withdrawn from the front, but it had been earmarked for service in Greece. Greece had been liberated in October 1944, but in December the former partisans of the Greek People's Liberation Army (ELAS) refused to be disarmed and clashes broke out with their rivals of the National Republican Greek League (EDES), the so-called Dekemvriana conflict. 139th Brigade had already been sent to reinforce the British force in the country ('Arkforce'), and the rest of the division including 172nd Field Rgt followed on 14 January 1945. The division was given responsibility for restoring the rule of law in the area in the northern Peloponnese, which had without it for the past four years of German occupation. The fighting was effectively over and the British troops were used to collect guerilla arms, establish the Greek National Guard Defence Battalions, and issue United Nations relief supplies.

=== Austria ===
46th Division began sailing back to Italy in early April, its last troops leaving Greece by the middle of the month. Fighting in Italy ended on 2 May with the Surrender of Caserta. V Corps was sent into Austria for occupation duties, and 46th Division was concentrated to take part in this operation. It crossed into Austria on 12 May and remained there on occupation duties for the rest of its service.

172nd Field Regiment and its batteries were disbanded on 7 November 1945.
