= 175th Field Regiment, Royal Artillery =

10th & 12th Defence Regiments, RA 175th Field Regiment, RA
- Royal Artillery cap badge
- Active: 4 October 1940–8 February 1943; 8 July 1943–11 April 1946
- Country: United Kingdom
- Branch: British Army
- Role: Field artillery
- Size: 3–4 Batteries
- Part of: 77th Infantry Division; 45th (Holding) Division.

The 175th Field Regiment was a unit of Britain's Royal Artillery (RA) during World War II. Originally formed to man beach defence batteries, it was later converted to field artillery. It served in Home Forces and supplied trained gunners to the fighting fronts, but saw no active service. It was disbanded after the war.

== 10th and 12th Defence Regiments ==
After the British Expeditionary Force was evacuated from Dunkirk and the United Kingdom was threatened with invasion, a crash programme of installing coastal artillery batteries was implemented in the summer of 1940.

Later, as the Home Defence strategy developed, the Royal Artillery formed a number of 'Defence Batteries' to deploy around the coastline for general beach defence. These were not part of the RA's Coast Artillery branch, nor were they included in the field forces under Commander-in-Chief, Home Forces, but equipped with whatever old guns were available they freed up scarce field artillery from static beach defence for the mobile counter-attack forces. Most of these batteries were formed on 1 September 1940, and they were grouped into regiments from 4 October.

- 10th Defence Regiment was formed at Mere, Wiltshire with 944–950 Defence Batteries. On 15 March 1941 944, 946, 948 and 950 Defence Btys were disbanded.
- 12th Defence Regiment was formed at Dunster, Somerset, with 955 and 956 Defence Batteries.

== 175th Field Regiment ==
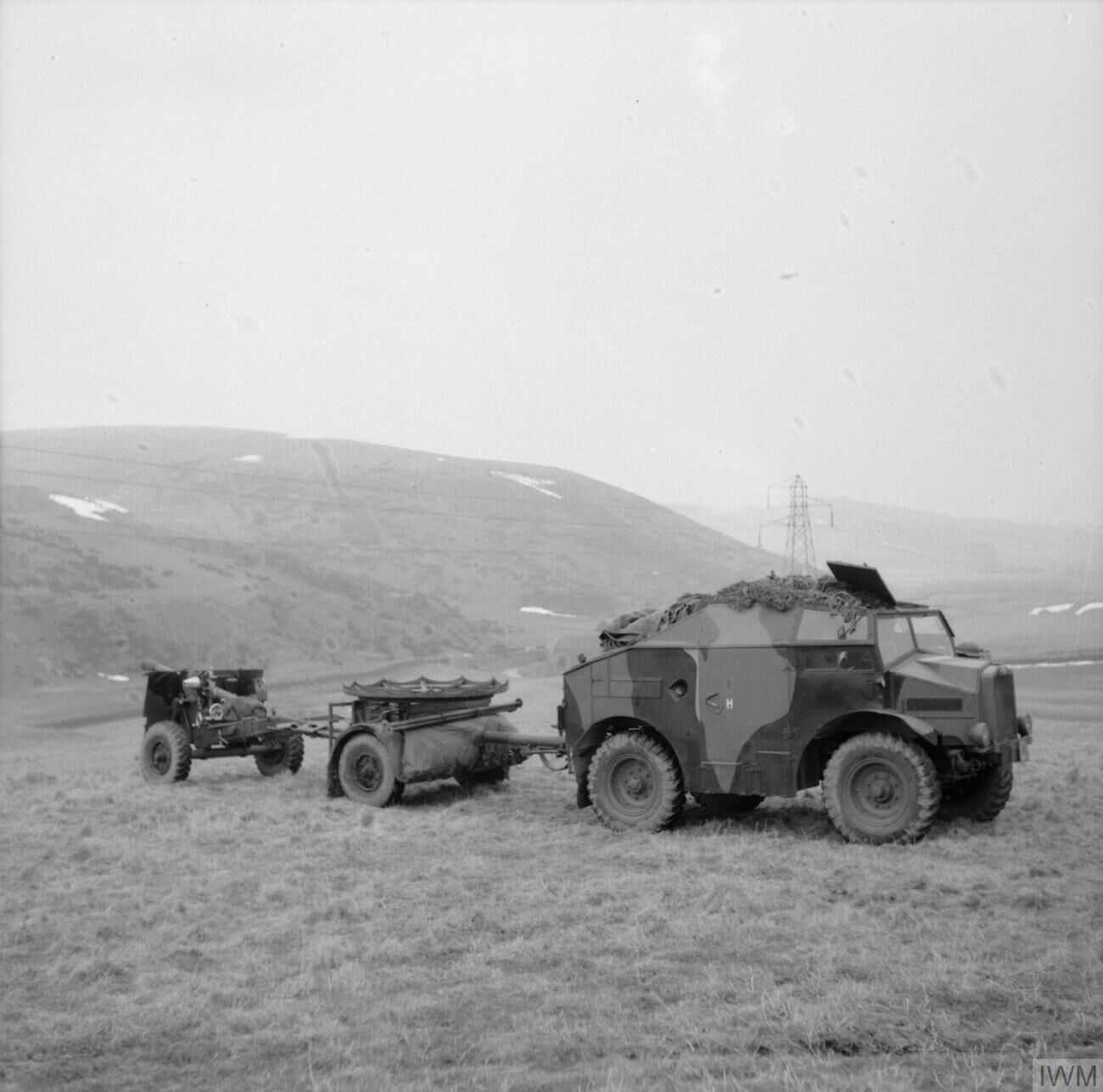
A 25-pounder gun and Quad tractor on a training exercise in the UK.

By the beginning of 1942 the imminent threat of invasion had passed, the coast artillery batteries were fully established, and the RA required gunners for the field forces. The remaining Defence Regiments in the UK were disbanded or converted into field artillery. On 12 January 1942 10th Defence Rgt was converted into 175th Field Regiment at Tiverton, Devon, and 945, 947 and 949 Defence Btys were designated A, B and C Btys. At the same time 12th Defence Regt and 955 Defence Bty were disbanded, and the personnel of 956 Defence Bty helped to form C Bty. A, B and C Btys were redesignated P, Q and R on 11 March. At this period the establishment of a field regiment was three batteries, each of two troops of four 25-pounder guns.

Divisional insignia of 77th Division.

On 2 July 1942 the regiment was assigned to 77th Infantry Division in Home Forces. On 1 January 1943 the regiment's batteries were numbered as 162, 163 and 164 Field Btys. But on 11 January the regiment's batteries were transferred to 176th Field Rgt, which replaced it in the division. Regimental HQ (RHQ) of 175th Field Rgt remained without any batteries to command until 8 February when it was disbanded at Blandford Camp, Dorset; its personnel were drafted to form RHQ of a new 15th Medium Rgt.

However, on 20 July 1943, RHQ of 175th Field Rgt was reformed at Gosforth, Northumberland, when 145, 165, 166 and 167 Field Btys were transferred to it from 176th Field Rgt. 175th Field Rgt returned to 77th Division (now a reserve division) on 9 August. The primary role of the reserve divisions was to provide trained reinforcements to units serving in active theatres. On 1 December 1943 the division was downgraded to 77th (Holding) Division and its units were reorganised for sorting, retraining and temporarily holding personnel who were unattached due to disbandments, medical reasons and other causes. After D Day on 6 June 1944 the reserve and holding divisions supplied reinforcements mainly to 21st Army Group fighting in Normandy. Having been drained of most of its manpower, 77th (Holding) Division was disbanded on 1 September 1944 and reformed as a replacement for the disbanded 45th Division. 175th and 176th Field Rgts transferred to the new 45th (Holding) Division and remained with it until the end of the war.

175th Field Rgt and its batteries were disbanded on 11 April 1946.
