= 176th Field Regiment, Royal Artillery =

11th Defence Regiment, RA 176th Field Regiment, RA
- Royal Artillery cap badge
- Active: 4 October 1940–28 March 1946
- Country: United Kingdom
- Branch: British Army
- Role: Field artillery
- Size: 3–8 Batteries
- Part of: 77th Infantry Division; 45th (Holding) Division.

The 176th Field Regiment was a unit of Britain's Royal Artillery (RA) during World War II. Originally formed to man beach defence batteries, it was later converted to field artillery. It served in Home Forces and supplied trained gunners to the fighting fronts, but saw no active service. It was disbanded after the war.

== 11th Defence Regiment ==
After the British Expeditionary Force was evacuated from Dunkirk and the United Kingdom was threatened with invasion, a crash programme of installing coastal artillery batteries was implemented in the summer of 1940.

Later, as the Home Defence strategy developed, the Royal Artillery formed a number of 'Defence Batteries' to deploy around the coastline for general beach defence. These were not part of the RA's Coast Artillery branch, nor were they included in the field forces under Commander-in-Chief, Home Forces, but equipped with whatever old guns were available they freed up scarce field artillery from static beach defence for the mobile counter-attack forces. Most of these batteries were formed on 1 September 1940, and they were grouped into regiments from 4 October. 11th Defence Regiment was formed at Bude, Cornwall, with 951, 952, 953 and 954 Defence Batteries. On 15 March 1941 951 Defence Bty was disbanded.

== 176th Field Regiment ==
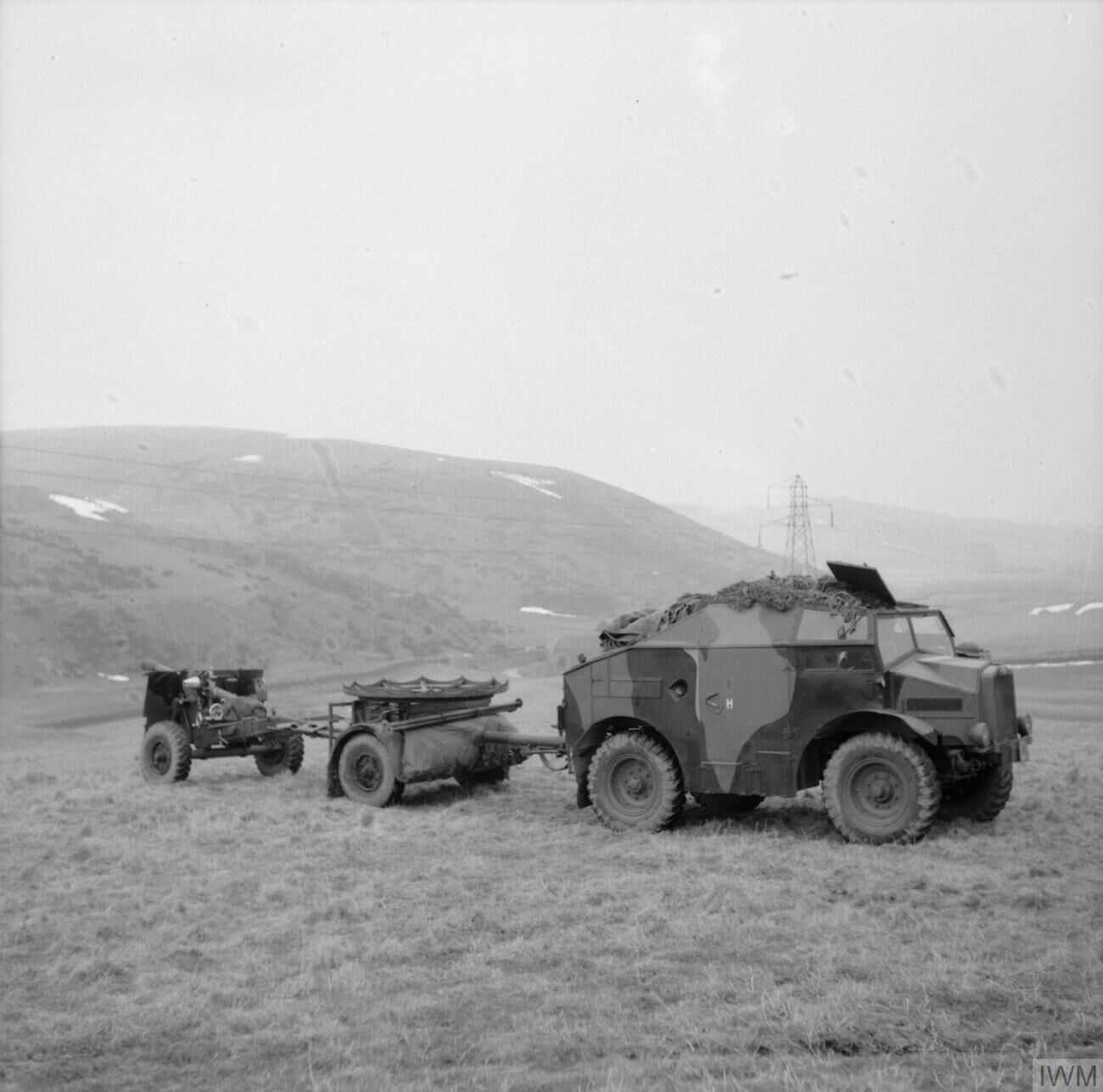
A 25-pounder gun and Quad tractor on a training exercise in the UK.

By the beginning of 1942 the imminent threat of invasion had passed, the coast artillery batteries were fully established, and the RA required gunners for the field forces. The remaining Defence Regiments in the UK were disbanded or converted into field artillery. On 12 January 1942 11th Defence Rgt was converted into 176th Field Regiment at Greenham, near Bridgwater, Somerset, and 952, 953 and 954 Defence Btys were designated A, B and C Btys. A, B and C Btys were redesignated P, Q and R on 11 March. At this period the establishment of a field regiment was three batteries, each of two troops of four 25-pounder guns.

Divisional insignia of 77th Division.

On 21 December 1942 the regiment was assigned to 77th Infantry (Reserve) Division in Home Forces, replacing 175th Field Rgt. On 1 January 1943 the regiment's batteries were numbered as 165, 166 and 167 Field Btys, and on 11 January 162, 163 and 165 Field Btys were transferred to it from 175th Field Rgt. At the same time 144 and 145 Field Btys were transferred in from 169th Field Rgt, giving 176th Field Rgt a total of eight batteries. However, on 20 July 1943 175th Field Rgt was reformed and 145, 165, 166 and 167 Field Btys were transferred to it.

The primary role of the reserve divisions was to provide trained reinforcements to units serving in active theatres. On 1 December 1943 77th (Reserve) Division was downgraded to 77th (Holding) Division and its units were reorganised for sorting, retraining and temporarily holding personnel who were unattached due to disbandments, medical reasons and other causes. After D Day on 6 June 1944 the reserve and holding divisions supplied reinforcements mainly to 21st Army Group fighting in Normandy. Having been drained of most of its manpower, 77th (Holding) Division was disbanded on 1 September 1944 and reformed as a replacement for the disbanded 45th Division. 175th and 176th Field Rgts transferred to the new 45th (Holding) Division until the end of the war.

176th Field Rgt and its batteries began to disband on 2 March 1946, completing the process by 28 March.
