= 177th Field Regiment, Royal Artillery =

13th, 14th & 15th Defence Regiments, RA 177th Field Regiment, RA
- Royal Artillery cap badge
- Active: 4 October 1940–14 March 1944
- Country: United Kingdom
- Branch: British Army
- Role: Field artillery
- Size: 3 Batteries
- Part of: 33rd Independent Infantry Brigade (Guards)

The 177th Field Regiment was a unit of Britain's Royal Artillery (RA) during World War II. Originally formed to man beach defence batteries, it was later converted to field artillery. It served in Home Forces in the London defences, but saw no active service. It was converted to reform a unit of the Regular Army in 1944.

== 13th, 14th and 15th Defence Regiments ==
After the British Expeditionary Force was evacuated from Dunkirk and the United Kingdom was threatened with invasion, a crash programme of installing coastal artillery batteries was implemented in the summer of 1940.

Later, as the Home Defence strategy developed, the Royal Artillery formed a number of 'Defence Batteries' to deploy around the coastline for general beach defence. These were not part of the RA's Coast Artillery branch, nor were they included in the field forces under Commander-in-Chief, Home Forces, but equipped with whatever old guns were available they freed up scarce field artillery from static beach defence for the mobile counter-attack forces. Most of these batteries were formed on 1 September 1940, and they were grouped into regiments from 4 October, including:

- 13th Defence Regiment formed at Hightown, Lancashire
  - 957 and 958 Defence Btys
- 14th Defence Regiment formed at Swansea, South Wales
  - 959, 960 and 961 Defence Btys
- 15th Defence Regiment formed at Alcester, Warwickshire
  - 962, 963, and 964 Defence Btys

In the spring of 1941, the defence regiments were reorganised: 13th and 15th Defence Rgts were disbanded on 8 and 9 April, and 959 Bty of 14th Defence Rgt on 12 April. 964 Defence Bty of 15th Rgt was transferred to 14th Defence Rgt, and 958 Bty of 13th Defence Rgt became an independent defence battery.

== 177th Field Regiment ==
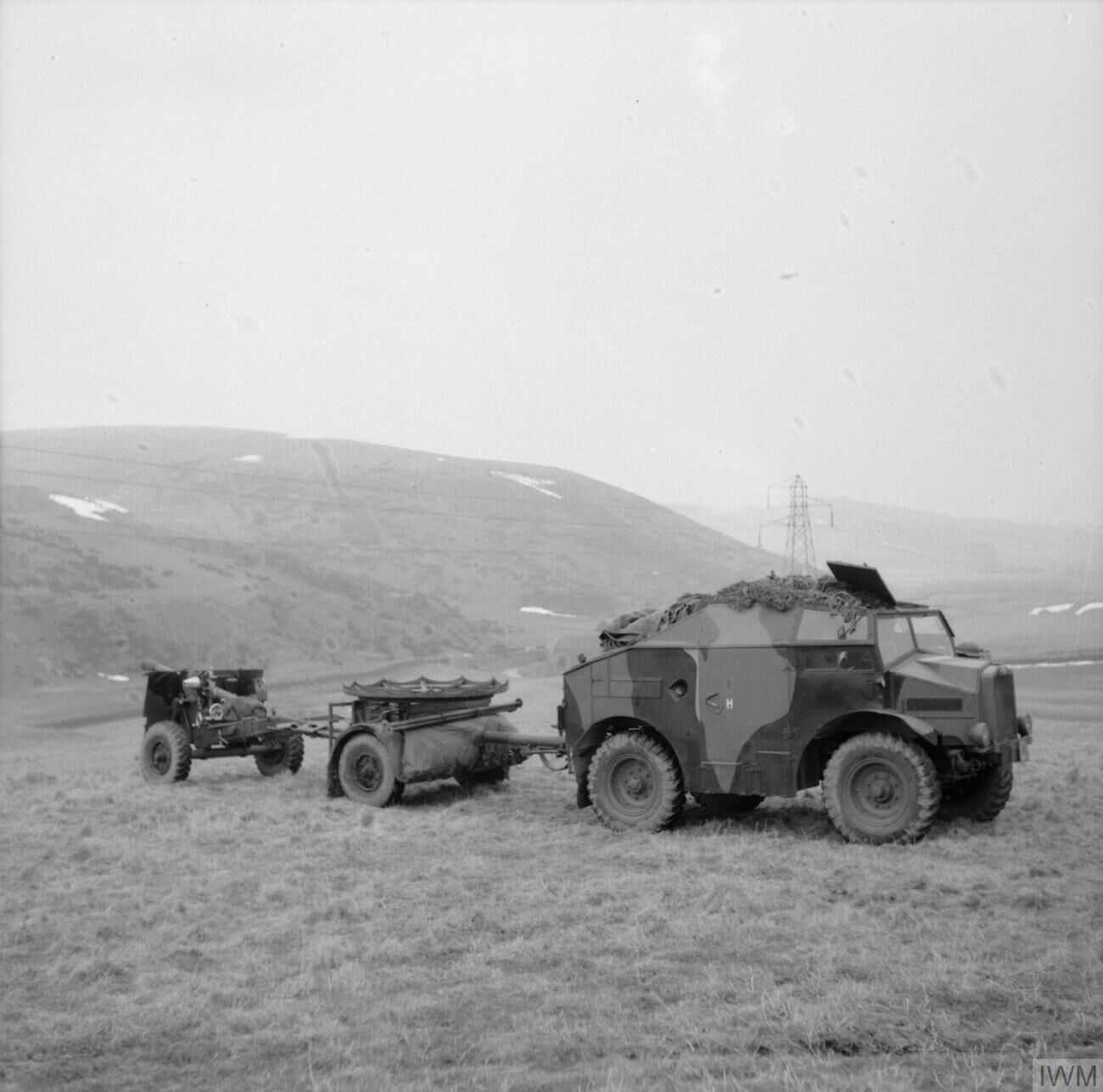
A 25-pounder gun and Quad tractor on a training exercise in the UK.

By the beginning of 1942 the imminent threat of invasion had passed, the coast artillery batteries were fully established, and the RA required gunners for the field forces. The remaining Defence Regiments in the UK were disbanded or converted into field artillery. On 12 January 1942 14th Defence Rgt was converted into 177th Field Regiment at Porthcawl, North Wales, and 960, 961 and 964 Defence Btys were designated A, B and C Btys; 958 Independent Defence Bty was also absorbed into C Bty. A, B and C Btys were redesignated P, Q and R on 11 March. At this period the establishment of a field regiment was three batteries, each of two troops of four 25-pounder guns.

On 10 November 1942 the regiment became part of 33rd Independent Infantry Brigade (Guards), which was being constituted as an independent brigade group, with its own artillery, engineer and support components, in the important London District under Home Forces.

Formation sign of 33rd Independent Brigade (Guards).

On 1 January 1943 the regiment's batteries were numbered as 168, 169 and 170 Field Btys.

33rd Bde was broken up in the autumn of 1943 and 177th Field Rgt left on 4 October. On 14 March 1943 the regiment was at Retford, Nottinghamshire, when it was disbanded to reform 25th Field Rgt, a Regular Army unit that had been captured at the Fall of Tobruk in June 1942:

- RHQ 177th Field Rgt became RHQ 25th Field Rgt
- 168 Field Bty became 12/25 Field Bty
- 169 Field Bty became 31 Field Bty
- 170 Field Bty became 58 Field Bty

25th Field Rgt served as an army field regiment in the campaign in North West Europe. Postwar it was redesignated 29th Field Rgt and exists today as 29th Commando Regiment.
