= Hull down =

Upper part of vehicle is visible, hull is not

In sailing and warfare, to be hull down means that the upper part of a vessel or vehicle is visible, but the main, lower body (hull) is not; the term hull up means that all of the body is visible. The terms originated with sailing and naval warfare in which the curvature of the Earth causes an approaching vessel to be first visible "sails up". Beginning in the 20th century, hull down has also been used in armoured warfare.

In modern armoured warfare, hull down is a position taken up by an armoured fighting vehicle (AFV) so that its hull (the main part of the vehicle) is behind a crest or other raised ground, but its turret (or a superstructure or roof-mounted weapon) is exposed. Turret down is the position in which the vehicle's crew can observe forward from roof hatches, but the vehicle is completely hidden (usually a few metres further back from a hull-down position). The belly armour should not be exposed, because it is vulnerable to even modest antitank weapons.

== Ships ==
A ship at different distances

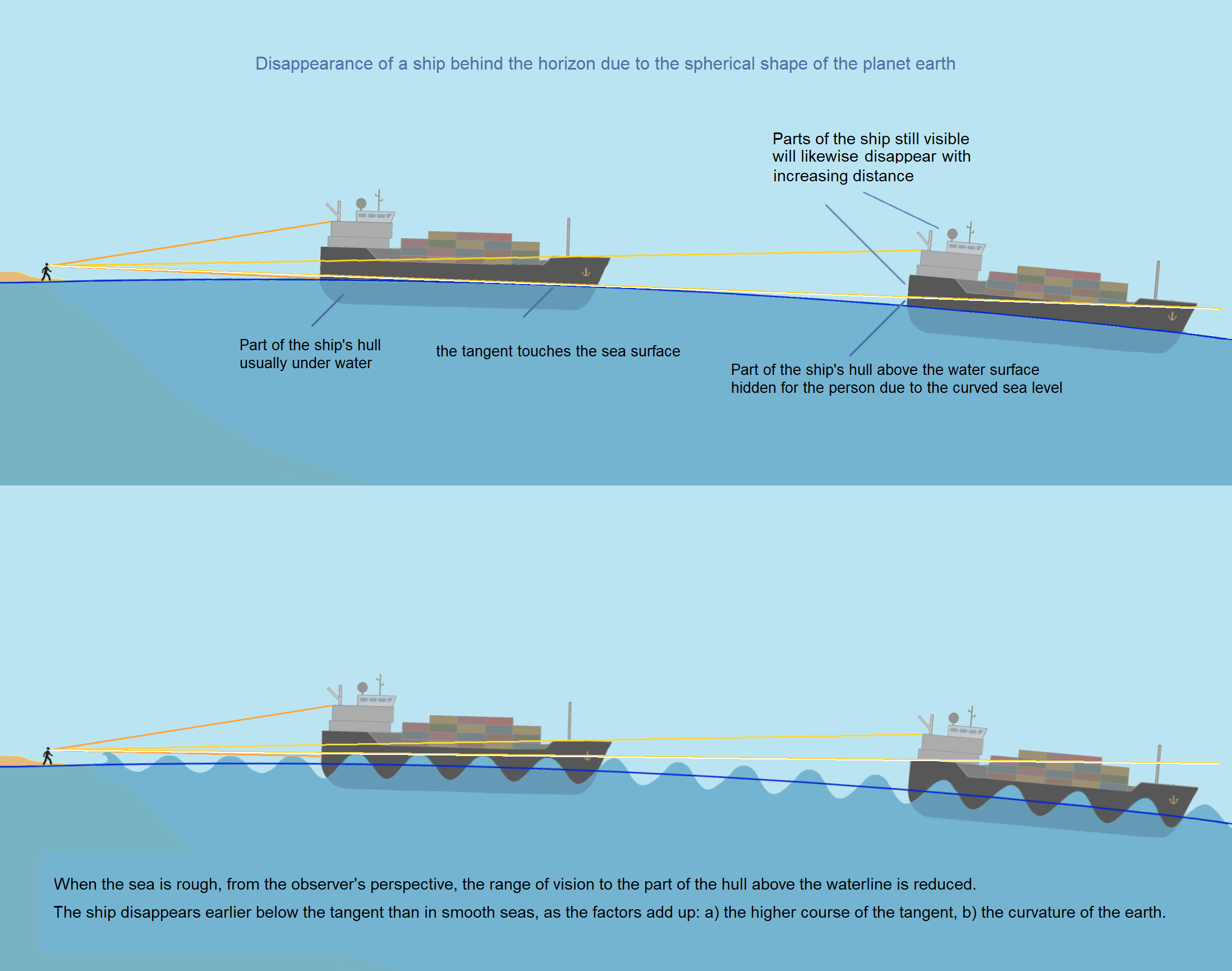

When a ship moves away, due to the curvature of the Earth, the ship's hull will disappear under the sightline at a much smaller distance than its upper rigging. The geodetic visibility depends on the altitude of the observation site and the altitude of the object being viewed. For example, in clear air a lookout at the top of a mast 130 feet (40 m) above the water will be able to see the top of another 130 ft mast from over 24 nautical miles (44 km) away, but will be able to see the hull above the waterline of the other ship from only 12 nautical miles (22 km) away. The discovery of the hull-down phenomenon in sailing was essential to disproving the Flat Earth theory.

With a clear horizon, whether a vessel is hull down or hull up gives some idea of its distance from the observer, using the line-of-sight formula.

=== Tactical considerations ===
In naval warfare, while the upper rigging (of a sailing vessel) or radio mast and stacks (of a steam ship) may give some idea of its type, it is impossible to tell the true nature of a ship when it is hull down and its armament and size are not visible. Especially during the age of sail, a naval vessel that chose to pursue a possible enemy vessel spotted hull down ran the risk of unknowingly closing on a more powerful opponent — depending on the wind and other conditions, it might not be possible to flee once the other vessel was clearly visible hull up.

Hull down was also used to describe a commercial sailing vessel being under sail and loaded sailing briskly to windward.

== Armoured warfare ==
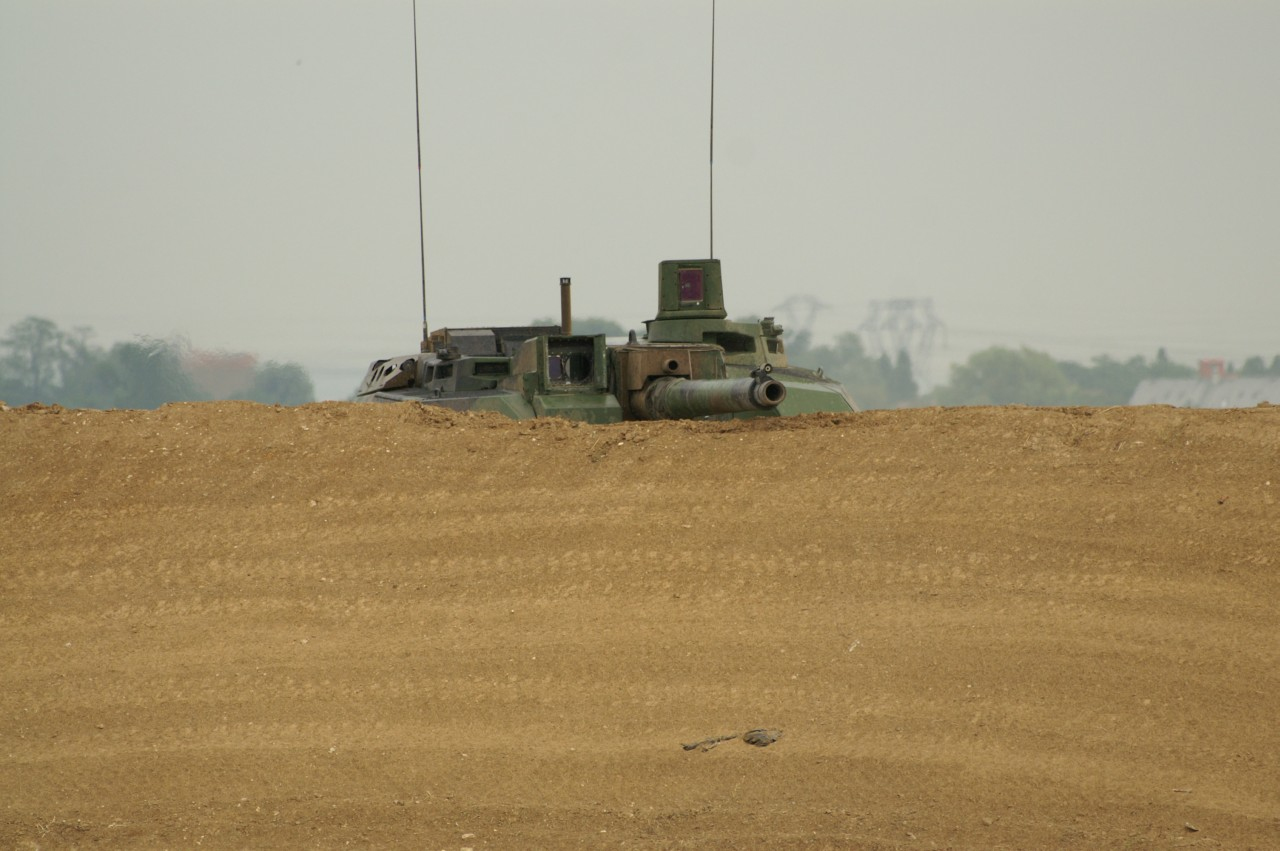
Leclerc tank in a hull-down position. Note the observation periscope which would allow the commander to observe in turret-down position.

In modern armoured warfare, 'hull down' is a position taken up by an armoured fighting vehicle (AFV) such that its hull (the main part of the vehicle) is behind a crest or other raised ground, but its turret (or a superstructure or roof-mounted weapon) is exposed. This allows it to observe and fire upon the ground ahead, while the hull is protected from enemy fire behind hard cover. A hull-down AFV is said to be in defilade. Taking advantage of hull-down positions is an element of tactical movement.

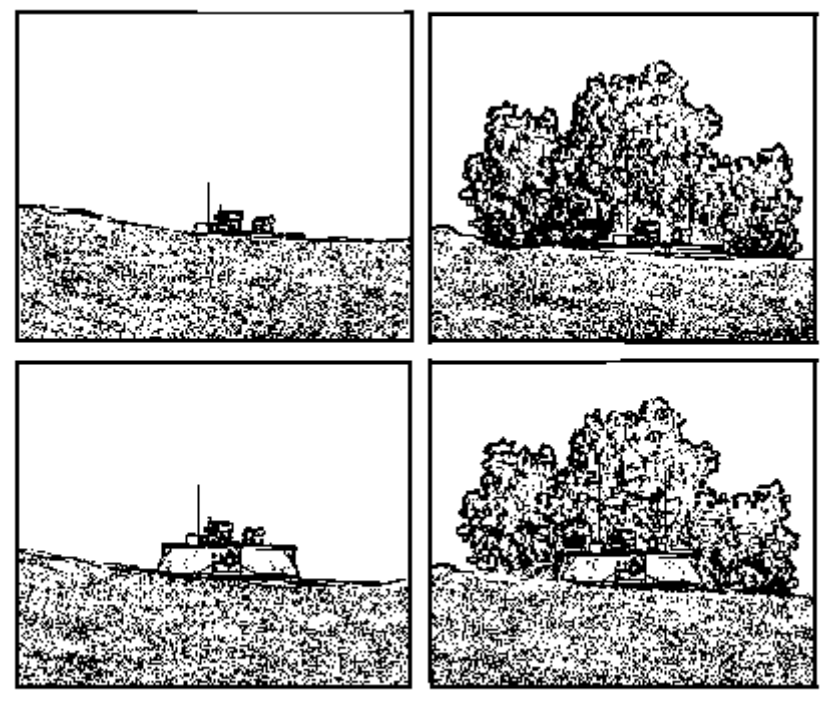
Front view of an Abrams in turret-down and hull-down positions. A vehicle in a position with a background is more difficult to observe than one which is skylined.

Turret down is the position in which the vehicle's crew can observe forward from roof hatches, but the vehicle is completely hidden (usually a few metres further back from a hull-down position). This can also apply to vehicles without turrets.

In flat or gently rolling terrain, a hull-down position is difficult to find. The actual protecting rise of ground may be hundreds of metres long. In steep or abrupt terrain cover is plentiful, but it may be difficult to find covered positions from which the vehicle's main gun can fire upon terrain ahead (see tank design, below).

In preparing defensive works, a hull-down position can be created or improved by digging shallow "tank scrapes". Tank units usually have one or two tanks with 'dozer' blades attached for this purpose, and some tank models have a built-in blade. Combat engineering vehicles often accompany armoured vehicles as they manoeuvre to dig tank scrapes, as they can accomplish the task more quickly.

=== Tactical movement ===
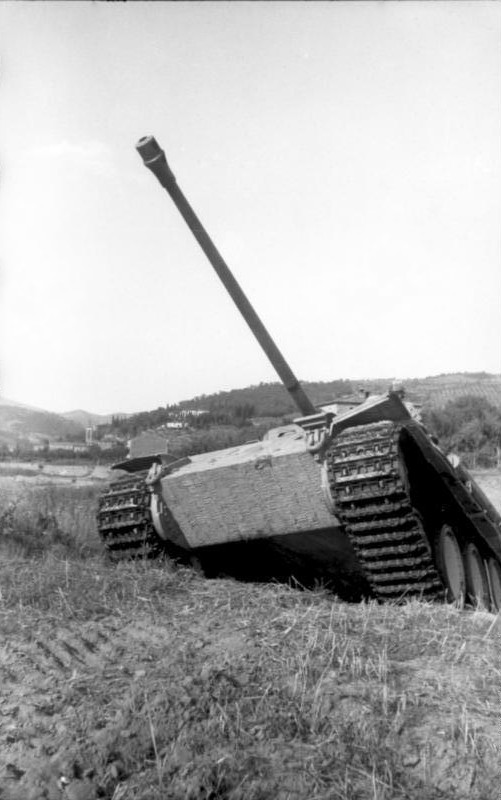
A tank's exposed belly armour is vulnerable to even modest antitank weapons. This is a Panther tank, cresting a hill.

Crossing a crest or ridgeline is a dangerous manoeuvre for AFVs, as they are particularly exposed to enemy fire while silhouetted against the sky (skylined). While cresting a steep slope, the thin armour on the front bottom of a tank's hull (below the thick glacis plate) can be exposed to fire. After cresting, the thin top armour may be exposed while it moves down the forward slope. If an antitank gunner has spotted the AFV, they may train their sights on it and wait for an easy shot while it moves forward.

After observing from a hull-down or turret-down position, an armoured vehicle will try to advance while minimizing these risks. If possible, it may reverse away from a crest, and try to find a route forward through the relative safety of hidden low ground (dead ground).

If crossing a long crest is unavoidable, the vehicle can back down and jockey at least 50 metres across the covered back of the slope, before advancing over the crest at high speed. An enemy gunner will have little time to locate the target, train his sights on it, and take the shot. If the terrain is hilly enough, the AFV can quickly enter low ground, then advance through it to another hull-down position.

=== Mutual support ===
Small armoured units (companies or platoons) make use of these tactics in co-ordinated fashion, when contact with the enemy is expected. Since firing while moving was until recently impossible or ineffective, elements of a unit (platoons, patrols, or individual vehicles) take turns moving and supporting each other from the halt (see overwatch). This is called mutual support, or fire and movement, related to the infantry tactic of leap-frogging, or, somewhat more loosely, the air combat tactic of flying with a wingman. Co-ordination is accomplished by hand signals or radio messages.

Lightly armed reconnaissance elements make much use of covered movement and stealth, while offensive units such as tanks move much more aggressively. When speed is paramount, modern tanks (which can fire effectively while moving) may dispense with fire and movement, and move all at once.

=== Tank design ===
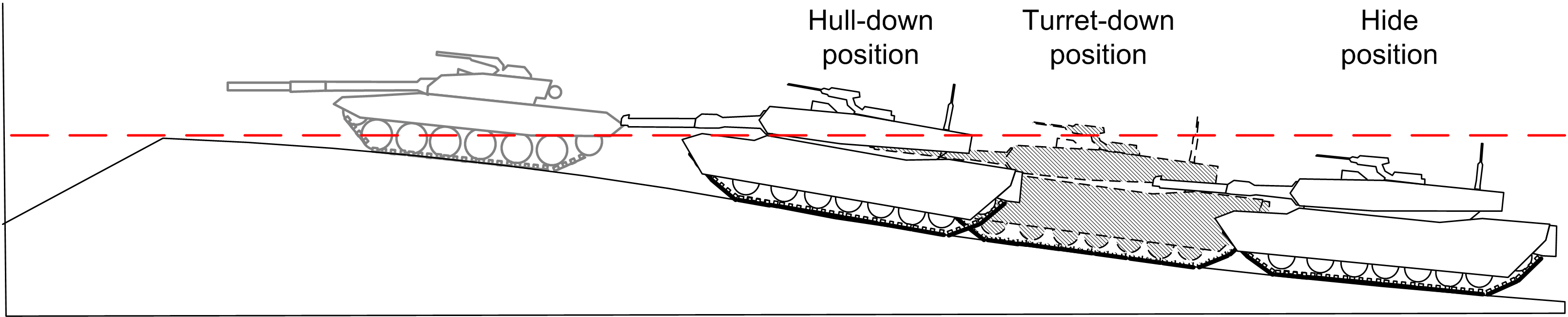
An M1 Abrams tank in hull down, turret down, and hidden positions behind a crest of ground. Shown to the left is the more exposed hull-down position a T-72 must adopt because of its main gun's limited range of depression (five degrees vs. the M1's ten degrees).

Tanks and other fighting vehicles must be able to depress their gun to be able to take advantage of many hull-down positions, since a vehicle's hull is usually tilted upwards when it is behind a crest. A vehicle with a relatively small range of gun depression may have to drive up onto an exposed crest or forward slope to be able to fire on lower ground to the front. Notably, Soviet and Russian tanks after World War II have very low profiles, but pay for this advantage by having a poor range of gun depression. Their low turret roof stops the rising gun breech when the muzzle is depressed. Thus, Soviet tank crews would have a hard time finding a hull-down position from which they could cover much of the terrain by fire. The typical Soviet tank had a range of elevation of -5 to +15 degrees, about two thirds that of Western tanks with a range of about -10 to +20 degrees.

This disadvantage was deemed acceptable, as Soviet tanks were designed to be used as an offensive weapon, fighting over flat terrain. Soviet tactics didn't neglect the defence, however. Newer Soviet tank models were equipped with an integral dozer blade, so given time, they could improve a hull-down position. Soviet tactics also emphasize the use of tanks on the defence in the counterattack role, rather than engaging an enemy advance from prepared positions.

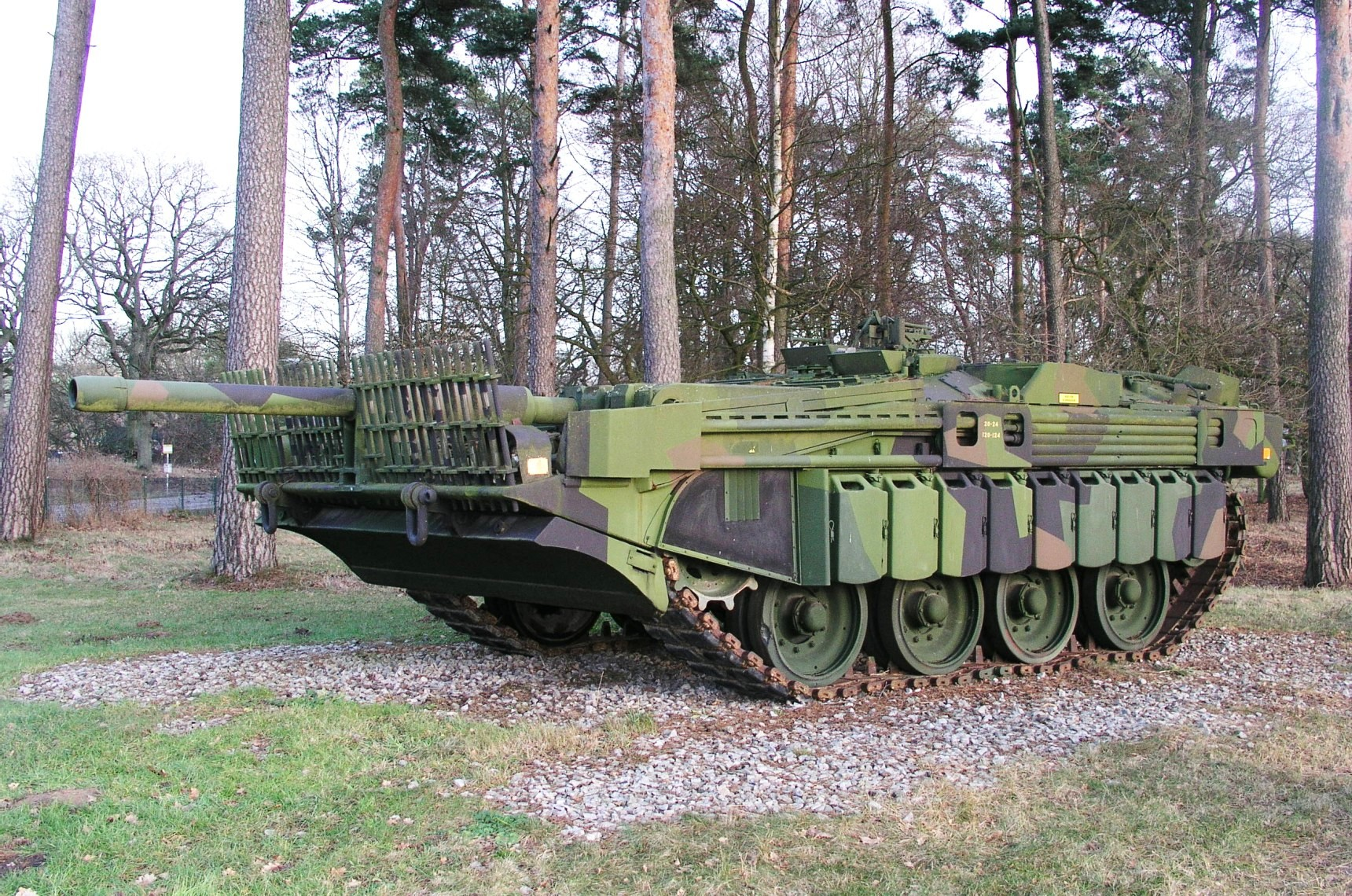
Stridsvagn 103

The Swedish Stridsvagn 103, while resembling a tank destroyer, was actually a main battle tank. The turretless design was chosen to give it a low profile and thus increase protection, including in a hull-down position. It was however intended to be used in the offensive role, as the armoured brigades it served in were assault brigades intended for counter-offensive operations against enemy beachheads and airborne landings.

== See also ==
- Radar horizon
- Spherical Earth
