= Moonlight Batteries, Royal Artillery =

The Moonlight Batteries were searchlight units of the British Army's Royal Artillery that specialised in providing 'artificial moonlight', otherwise known as 'movement light' or 'Monty's moonlight', for ground operations during the latter stages of World War II.

== Early uses ==
=== Sea ===
Navies were the first military forces to adopt the newly developed electric arc lamp searchlights (S/Ls) in the later 19th Century, to illuminate potential targets at night. Before the Bombardment of Alexandria in 1882, the Royal Navy force employed its searchlights to prove that Ahmed ‘Urabi's troops were strengthening the fortifications at night in defiance of the British ultimatum. Similarly, searchlights were also used to defend Ports against incursions by warships at night: in Britain this role became the responsibility of the fortress engineers and electrical engineers of the Royal Engineers (RE).

=== Land ===
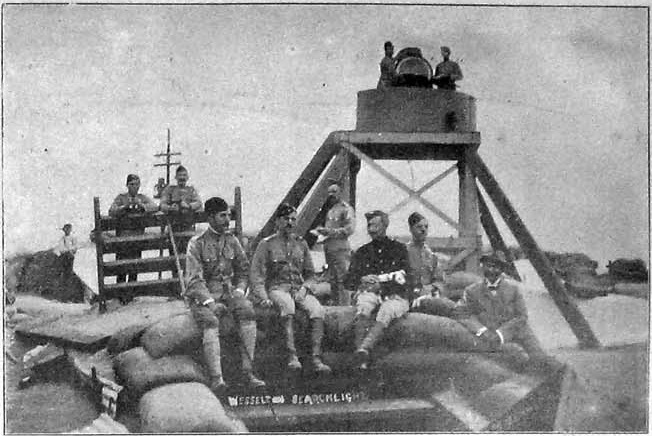
A searchlight set up at the Wesselton Mine during the Siege of Kimberley during the 2nd Boer War.

Early in the Second Boer War, Colonel Robert Baden-Powell improvised searchlights to deter night attacks on his lines during the Siege of Mafeking. Soon afterward Major Rookes Crompton led a detachment of the Electrical Engineers Volunteers to South Africa where they operated electric arc lamp S/Ls of his own design, the first use of such equipment by the RE on campaign. They provided a primitive 'artificial moonlight' by reflecting the searchlight beams from clouds. After the onset of trench warfare in World War I, the Tyne Electrical Engineers provided detachments to operate oxy-acetylene S/Ls in forward areas to assist in night defence, but these proved a failure.

=== Air ===
World War I saw massive expansion of searchlight use in Anti-Aircraft (AA) defence to illuminate Zeppelins and bomber aircraft at night so that they could be engaged by AA guns and fighter aircraft. This became the predominant military use for searchlights between the World Wars, and in the 1930s the threat from Luftwaffe bombers in the event of war with Germany led to rapid expansion in the number of AA S/L units in Britain's part-time Territorial Army. These were frequently converted infantry battalions transferred to the RE or the RA. They formed part of Anti-Aircraft Command in Air Defence of Great Britain, but some units were also sent overseas after the outbreak of war to supplement the small number of Regular Army S/L units in defending ports, bases, airfields and other vital points.

== World War II ==
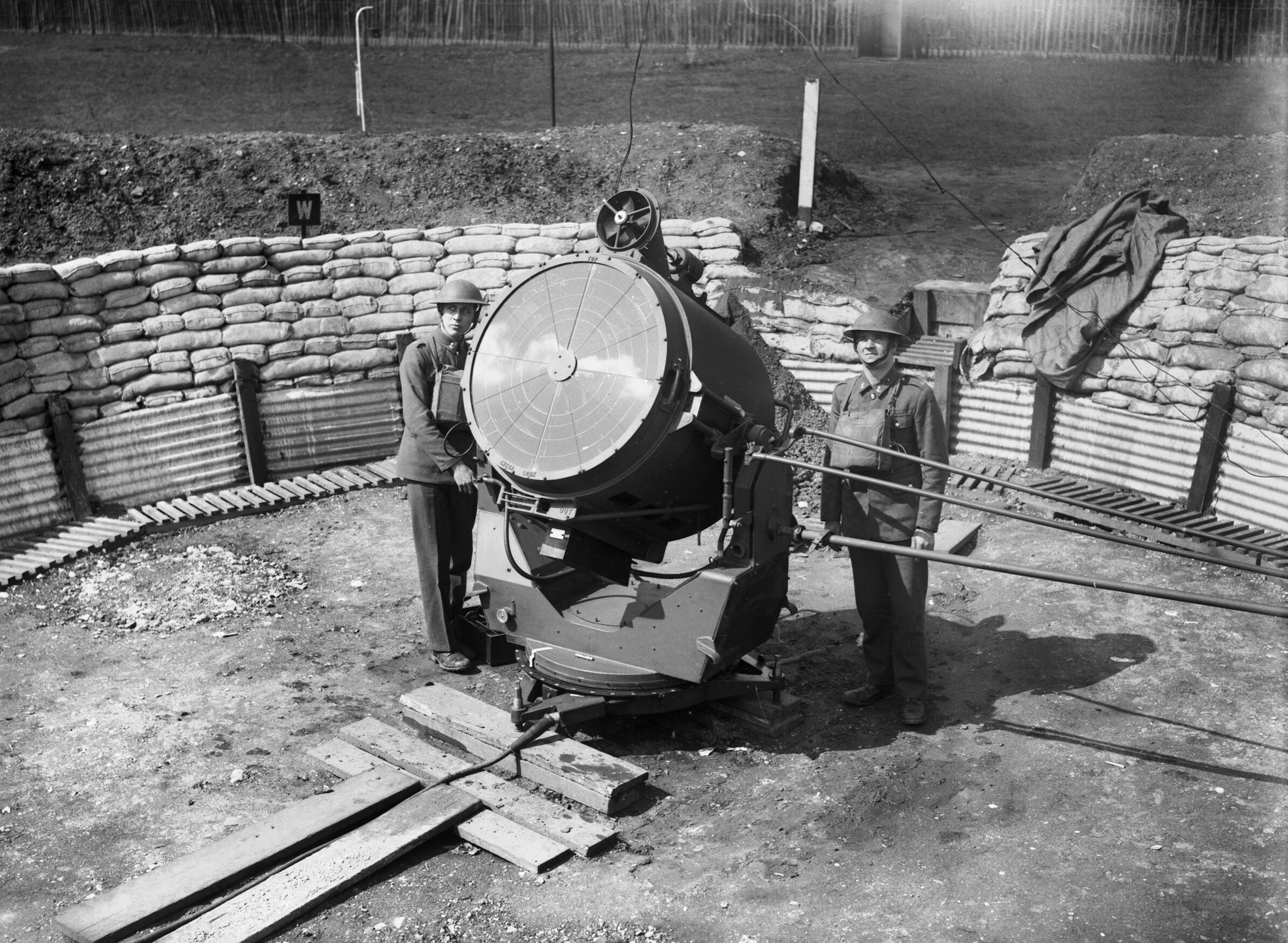
A British AA S/L deployed early in World War II.

All the Army's AA S/L units were transferred to the Royal Artillery during 1940. Their primary role was to illuminate enemy aircraft for AA guns or night fighters to engage, although providing directional beacons for friendly aircraft was a valuable secondary role. Searchlight units scored occasional successes by dazzling enemy pilots, but attempts to set up dazzle barrages (eg a 'Cardiff–Newport Dazzle Area') were not particularly successful. Other uses for S/Ls were slower to emerge.

=== Alamein ===
At the time of the Second Battle of El Alamein, the British Eighth Army had two troops of the London Electrical Engineers under its command for area AA protection, but five of their lights were used to assist advancing Allied troops in direction-keeping during Operation Lightfoot, the night attack that launched the battle. No attempt was made to illuminate the sky (the battle was fought in full moonlight, though this was much obscured by dust).

=== Sicily & Italy ===
Battlefield illumination was also used in the campaigns in Sicily and Italy up to and including the Gothic line. It was used to illuminate the battlefield for not only infantry attack but also, because of the ridge nature of the terrain, catching out German Artillery in the full glare of light on the opposite slopes. Careful reconnoitring of the area and individual placement achieved excellent results. The 1st Canadian Group had with them 422nd S/L Battery who undertook this task successfully.

=== Normandy ===
By the time of Operation Overlord and the Normandy campaign in the summer of 1944 the Luftwaffe was greatly weakened, and the use of radar by AA guns and night-fighters was widespread, so the S/L units in 21st Army Group were under-employed. Some lights from 474th S/L Battery were given a subsidiary coast defence role to protect the anchorages from E-Boat attacks. By late August, as 21st Army Group broke out of the beachhead, enemy night air raids were rare and 557th S/L Bty was used to provide floodlighting for round-the-clock bridge-building by the Royal Engineers; this soon became a routine task for S/L units. As the advance across France gathered momentum, newly arrived batteries of 41st and 42nd S/L Rgts found themselves providing security lighting for Prisoner of war (PoW) camps.

90 cm Projector Anti-Aircraft, displayed at Fort Nelson, Portsmouth

The major new use for S/L units in this campaign was to reflect light off the cloudbase to provide 'artificial moonlight' or 'movement light' (also known as 'Monty's moonlight' after 21st Army Group's commander, General Sir Bernard Montgomery) in support of night operations. 344th, 356th and 474th Independent S/L Batteries pioneered this technique using their mobile 90 cm searchlights. On 9 July, 474 Bty sent six S/L detachments to provide artificial moonlight in the forward area for 43rd (Wessex) Division, which was moving up to its starting positions for Operation Jupiter. Three days later, the battery repeated the process for 53rd (Welsh) Division.

The technique was next used operationally to assist the assembly of troops for Operation Greenline on the night of 14/15 July, when the drivers of 15th (Scottish) Division 'found the light a great help to them in finding their way up the pot-holed track through the blinding dust'. The S/L positions were subjected to light retaliatory shelling and mortar fire and to low-level air attack, suffering some casualties. However, during the fighting the following night, a jammed column of troops and vehicles was dangerously silhouetted in the movement light, while elsewhere a smoke cloud blotted it out. Nevertheless, from then on the S/L batteries were regularly called upon to send detachments to provide movement light to support British and Canadian formations as the Battle for Caen progressed This innovation in 21st Army Group narrowly preceded similar experiments by Eighth Army on the Italian front.

On 7/8 August, 344th S/L Bty provided lighting for II Canadian Corps' night attack south of Caen (Operation Totalize); officers of the newly arrived 557th S/L Bty attended to gain experience in this new technique.

=== The advance ===
After 21st Army Group broke out of its Normandy beachhead, 557th S/L Bty went to Le Havre where it provided artificial moonlight for the attack by I Corps on the night of 10/11 September (Operation Astonia). Here the technique proved particularly valuable for ensuring safe passage through gaps cut in the minefields. The battery then went on to provide lighting for the continued fighting in the town and docks.

In October, 557th S/L Bty joined II Canadian Corps in the Battle of the Scheldt (Operation Switchback), providing 'moonlight' for the attack on South Beveland and AA defence for the Canadian gun lines. Afterwards, it joined 344th, 356th, and 474th Btys in providing light for bridge and airfield construction, and AA defence for the bridges at Grave, Mook and Nijmegen that had been captured during Operation Market Garden. At Nijmegen the two vital bridges were under regular attack from the air and from frogmen with explosive charges, so that searchlights had to sweep the river as well as the sky.

On 4 November C Troop of 356 S/L Bty was detached to 51st (Highland) Division for its first experience with artificial moonlight. This was for an assault crossing of the Afwateringkanal and River Maas and subsequent bridgelaying. The troop stayed on to illuminate bridge repairs on the second night. After a difficult move, with several vehicles ditched, the troop was repositioned to join 474 S/L Bty in supporting a night move by 154 Bde into Nederweert on 9 November, during which the troop suffered minor damage from enemy shellfire. After a few nights providing movement light over canal and river bridges, XXX Corps sent C Troop to assist 84th US Division in its attack on Geilenkirchen as part of Operation Clipper. During the preparation period the S/Ls were exposed each night 'to fox the Boche' with 'stooge' beams in different directions. The attack went in at 04.00 on 18 November and the troop provided artificial moonlight until 07.00 to help the Flail tanks and engineers to breach the defences. The following night the troop assisted 43rd (Wessex) Division in the continuing attacks on the Geilenkirchen salient, receiving a retaliatory air raid that caused no damage. Heavy rain fell from 20 November onwards, and finding suitable S/L positions in the mud and minefields was difficult. Eventually the Troop deployed on a Hitler Youth campsite and at the railway station. As 84th Division's operation continued with the capture of Tripsrath, the lights attracted increasing amounts of enemy shellfire, causing minor casualties and damage. On 23 November the S/Ls were doused for a while to allow stretcher bearers to bring in the wounded. On 24 November a US S/L unit arrived to be briefed on the artificial moonlight technique, and the following day C Troop left 84th US Division and rejoined 43rd (Wessex) to resume routine movement light duties.

=== Experiments ===
Early in 1945, in preparation for the forthcoming attack in the Klever Reichswald (Operation Veritable), 31st (North Midland) Anti-Aircraft Brigade HQ in Belgium carried out experiments to optimise artificial moonlight techniques to provide lighting for night movement of ground troops, for floodlighting their objectives and for dazzling the defenders.

At the end of January 1945, 557th S/L Bty under First Canadian Army command began experiments to put a searchlight onto a Canadian Ram tank with its turret removed, with the electrical generator carried in a second accompanying tank. (The obsolete Rams were also being used as turretless armoured personnel carriers known as Kangaroos.) A section of 557 S/L Bty based at Nijmegen began operating these vehicles in February in support of 15th (Scottish) Division.

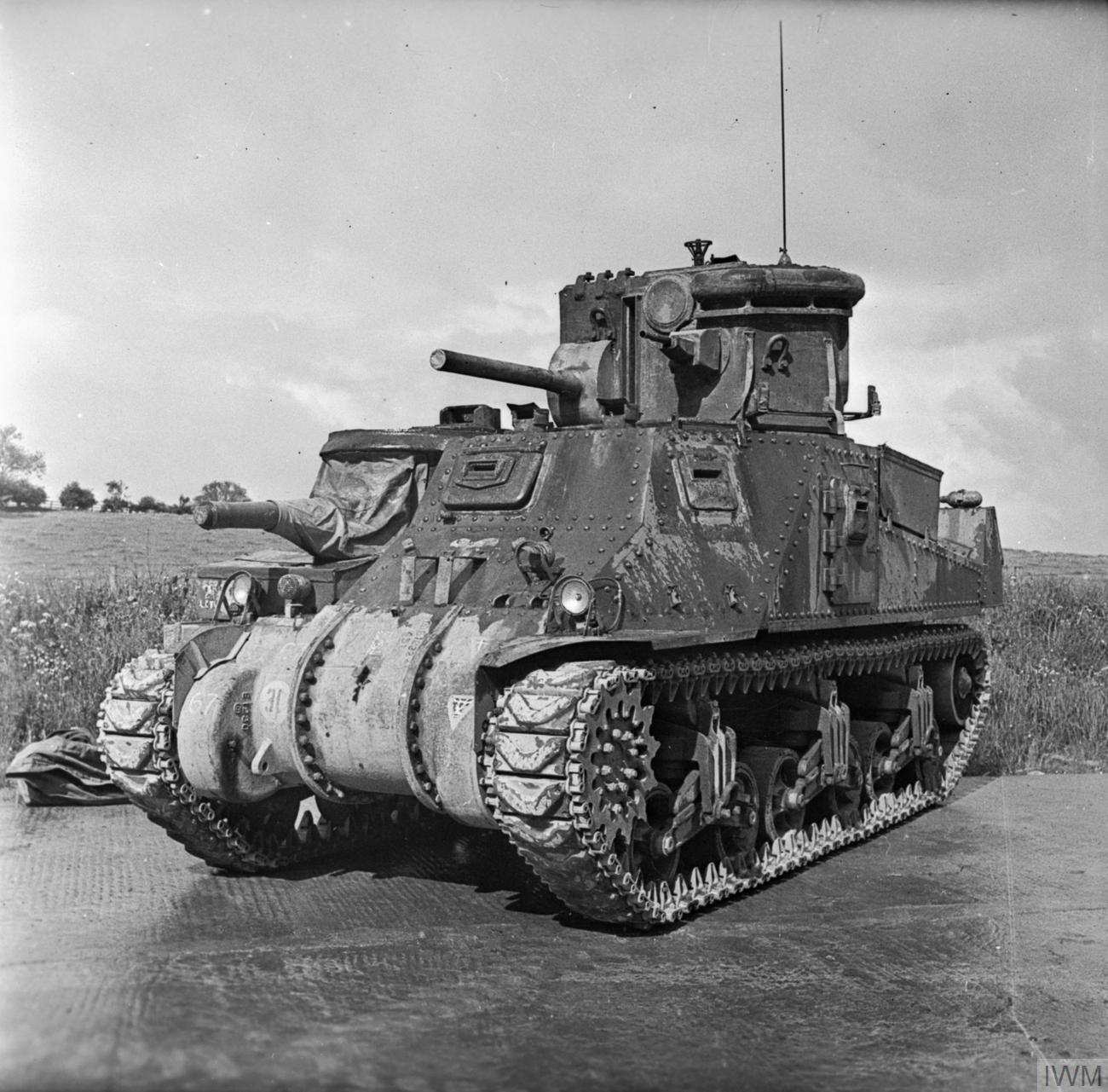
Grant CDL of 79th Armoured Division, with S/L and dummy gun in upper turret, 75 mm gun in side sponson.

The units involved were apparently unaware of the existence of the Canal Defence Lights (CDLs), which had been designed earlier in the war to equip night fighting tank battalions both to illuminate and to dazzle the enemy. The CDL consisted of a powerful searchlight fitted to a Matilda tank, replacing the turret and main armament. Later the Matilda CDLs were replaced by Grant tank CDLs, which retained the 75 mm main gun in its sponson. These weapons had been developed under great secrecy and by January 1942 a whole tank brigade had begun training on CDLs, later joining 79th Armoured Division, which concentrated all the specialised armour units training for Operation Overlord. In the end only one of the CDL units, 49th Royal Tank Regiment, went to Normandy, and it landed too late for Operation Totalize. The regiment was later converted into an Armoured Personnel Carrier Regiment (49 APCR) equipped with Kangaroos, and the CDLs were returned to store. 557th Battery's experiments were not continued, and CDLs were brought back out of storage for the assault crossing of the Rhine (Operation Plunder).

=== Germany ===
When Operation Veritable opened on 9 February, 356th, 474th and 557th Btys provided 'moonlight' for XXX Corps, VIII Corps and II Canadian Corps respectively. Four of 557th Bty's lights were mounted on steel towers specially erected by the RE. For the attacks on the Siegfried line (Westwall) bunkers, which took place on the night of D/D +1, part of the Klever Reichswald was floodlit, and some S/L positions were sited with the intention of dazzling the defenders while lighting up the obstacles.

During the battle, 557th Bty's lights were called upon to illuminate roads to help a Canadian brigade in danger from floods – presaging their later peacetime use in civil defence.

After their success in Veritable, three of the S/L batteries providing movement light were officially redesignated 'Moonlight' (M/L) batteries, and two further batteries (581st and 582nd) were formed. Each was assigned to an army corps. 356th Moonlight Battery continued with XXX Corps, whose commander, Lt-Gen Brian Horrocks, had highly commended the battery for its work in Veritable. However, in mid-March, while the battery was preparing for the Rhine crossing (Operation Plunder) it was ordered to revert to AA duties and transfer to 107th AA Bde under First Canadian Army. The whole battery, together with Horrocks and his Corps Commander Royal Artillery, resisted the transfer, and 356th M/L Bty continued planning for Plunder 'as if nothing had happened', while taking the precaution of refitting its lights with AA radar.

Trials of various S/L arrangements were carried out on the River Maas, and the plan decided on for the Rhine was for four banks of lights, one behind the assembly areas, two interspersed among them, and one well forward, close to the west bank of the river, a total of 33 S/L projectors per corps. The necessary build-up of material for Operation Plunder involved much night movement, and the deployment of lights included deception sites. The lights were used for several nights before the actual assault to 'accustom the Germans to their use'. For the assault crossing, 49 APCR formed 'B' Independent Squadron equipped with Grant CDLs, assigning a half squadron to each of the attacking corps, XII and XXX. During the assault on Rees by 51st (Highland) Division the Grants both illuminated the crossing and engaged the enemy on the far bank with their 75mm guns. The lighting was so intense that many of the troops crossing in the 'Buffalo' amphibious vehicles felt that they were dangerously silhouetted against the water.

After the Rhine had been crossed, 21st Army Group had to execute two further assault river crossings as it advanced across Germany: the Weser, where 581st M/L Bty supported XII Corps, and the Elbe (Operation Enterprise), with 581st M/L Bty in support of VIII Corps.

15th (Scottish) Division's experience of the Elbe crossing was described thus:

'The sky was densely overcast: so much so that the whole programme of air support for next morning had been cancelled. Yet so bright was the Movement Light of the many searchlights that slanted their diffused beams into the clouds from positions in rear that onlookers could stand unseen in the shadows of Artlenburg with nothing but the waters of the Elbe, molten and glowing, between them and the enemy'.

After VE Day the moonlight batteries carried out various occupation duties in Germany until their turn for demobilisation came round. Often this involved security lighting on important rivers, and for PoW camps.

== List of Moonlight Batteries in World War II ==
By the end of the war in Europe, there were five independent Moonlight Batteries operating in 21st Army Group:

- 344th Moonlight Battery: originally raised in 1936 as part of 36th (Middlesex) Anti-Aircraft Battalion, Royal Engineers, the battery later formed the cadre for 58th (Middlesex) Anti-Aircraft Battalion, Royal Engineers, transferred to the Royal Artillery in 1940 and became an independent mobile battery in 1943.
- 356th Moonlight Battery: originally a battery of 39th Searchlight Regiment, itself converted from the 7th Battalion, Lancashire Fusiliers in 1936; it became an independent mobile battery in 1943.
- 557th Moonlight Battery: originally a battery of 92nd S/L Regiment, RA formed in 1941; it became an independent mobile battery in 1943.
- 581st Moonlight Battery: formed as a duplicate by 344th Bty in March 1945.
- 582nd Moonlight Battery: formed from part of 557th Bty in March 1945.

In addition the following independent AA S/L Bty also operated in the M/L role on occasions, without change of designation:

- 474th Searchlight Battery: raised in March 1940; after forming part of 76th Searchlight Regiment it became an independent mobile battery in 1943.

== Postwar ==
The last RA S/L battery formed during World War II, 571 (Independent) S/L Bty raised on 1 April 1945, was redesignated 339 Movement Light Bty in the Regular Army on 1 April 1947. It was reduced to 4 Movement Light Troop on 14 October 1948, and disbanded on 1 February 1949.

When the Territorial Army was reconstituted in 1947, it included a number of Movement Light batteries:

- 856th Movement Light Battery (Devon & Cornwall Fortress Engineers): reconstituted from 432nd Light Anti-Aircraft Battery with HQ at Plymouth
- 858th Movement Light Battery (Carmarthenshire Fortress): reconstituted from 484th (Carmarthen) S/L Bty with HQ at Llanelli
- 871st (Independent) Movement Light Battery (Green Howards): reconstituted from 6th Bn Green Howards with HQ at Middlesbrough
- 873rd Movement Light Battery (The Middlesex Regiment): formed from part of 126th (Middlesex) Light Anti-Aircraft Regiment (formerly 60th (Middlesex) S/L Rgt) with HQ at Staines

During the East Coast Floods in February 1953, Q ('Quebec') Battery of 529 LAA/SL Rgt, stationed at Louth, deployed its gun towing vehicles to evacuate civilians from Sutton-on-Sea. It then employed the artificial moonlight technique with its S/Ls to allow round-the-clock working to repair the damaged sea defences, calling in additional lights from TA units across the North and Midlands. This commitment lasted for six weeks.

There were organisational changes in 1955, when 871st Bty was disbanded, but a new battery was formed:

- 863rd (County of Lincoln) Movement Light Battery: reconstituted from 539th (County of Lincoln) LAA Rgt

856th and 858th M/L Btys were transferred from the RA to the RE in 1956, with 858th being merged into 108 Field Engineer Rgt. The last RA M/L batteries were also converted to RE in 1961, becoming 863rd (County of Lincoln) Independent Movement Light Squadron and 873rd (Middlesex) Movement Light Squadron respectively.

873 Mov Lt Sqn provided lighting during the construction of the Medway bridges for the M2 motorway in 1962, but its offer to light the rescue efforts after the Aberfan disaster in 1966 was rejected. When the TA was converted into the smaller TAVR in 1967, 873 Sqn was reduced to Battery HQ and one Troop – the only dedicated searchlight unit remaining, not only in the British Army but the whole of NATO. It was finally disbanded in 1999.

== External sources ==
- Keith Brigstock 'Royal Artillery Searchlights', presentation to Royal Artillery Historical Society at Larkhill, 17 January 2007.
- British Army units from 1945 on (archive site)
- 873 Movement Light Squadron, RE.
- Stepping Forward: A Tribute to the Volunteer Military Reservists and Supporting Auxiliaries of Greater London.
- Yorkshire Volunteers Regimental Association.
