= 356th Moonlight Battery, Royal Artillery =

356th Moonlight Battery
- Cap badge of the Royal Artillery
- Active: 10 December 1936–31 May 1946
- Country: United Kingdom
- Branch: Territorial Army
- Role: Air defence Battlefield illumination
- Part of: 39th (Lancashire Fusiliers) Searchlight Regiment; XXX Corps
- Garrison/HQ: Salford, Greater Manchester
- Anniversaries: Minden Day
- Engagements: Liverpool Blitz; Operation Overlord; Operation Clipper; Operation Veritable; Operation Plunder

The 356th Moonlight Battery, Royal Artillery was a searchlight unit of the British Army that provided artificial illumination, or 'Monty's Moonlight', for night operations by 21st Army Group during the campaign in North West Europe in 1944–45. Previously, it had served on anti-aircraft (AA) duties during The Blitz.

== Origin ==
In the 1930s the increasing need for anti-aircraft (AA) defence for Britain's cities was addressed by converting a number of Territorial Army (TA) infantry battalions into searchlight battalions of the Royal Engineers (RE). The 7th Bn Lancashire Fusiliers was one unit selected for this role, becoming 39th (The Lancashire Fusiliers) AA Battalion, RE on 10 December 1936, consisting of HQ and four AA companies (354–357) at the Drill Hall, Cross Lane, Salford.

== World War II ==
=== Mobilisation ===
The TA's AA units were mobilised on 23 September 1938 during the Munich Crisis, with units manning their emergency positions within 24 hours, even though many did not yet have their full complement of men or equipment. The emergency lasted three weeks, and they were stood down on 13 October. In February 1939 the existing AA defences came under the control of a new Anti-Aircraft Command. In June, as the international situation worsened, a partial mobilisation of the TA was begun in a process known as 'couverture', whereby each AA unit did a month's tour of duty in rotation to man selected AA gun and searchlight positions. 356th AA Company was at Snaith in East Yorkshire when orders for full mobilisation were issued, and the company returned to Salford. It immediately manned two sections of four lights around Widnes and Knutsford, while the rest of the company manned Lewis gun positions at Latchford, Barton and Irwell Locks on the Manchester Ship Canal and at Barton Power Station. This deployment to guard Vital Points (VP) continued through the period known as the 'Phoney War' until the company was fully equipped with searchlights.

On 1 August 1940 the AA battalions of the RE were transferred to the Royal Artillery (RA), the 39th being designated 39th (The Lancashire Fusiliers) Searchlight Regiment, RA, and the Companies became Batteries. The day of the formal transfer happened to be Minden Day, celebrated in all battalions of the Lancashire Fusiliers by wearing red roses. 356 Battery held a parade at Salford. Despite transfer to the RE and then the RA, the regiment and its batteries continued to wear their Lancashire Fusiliers' cap badges and buttons.

=== Home Defence ===
Shortly afterwards, 355 and 356 Batteries went to Orkney, where they formed part of Orkney and Shetland Defences (OSDEF) guarding the vital Scapa Flow naval base against occasional Luftwaffe nuisance raids and reconnaissance aircraft. They were later joined by Regimental HQ.

39th Searchlight Regiment returned to England in April 1941, sailing from Kirkwall to Aberdeen, and then entraining for Liverpool, where it arrived just in time for a series of heavy night air raids that devastated the city of Liverpool ('the May Blitz'). The newly arrived searchlight crews were continuously in action, some stationed in the docks area that was a particular target of these raids. In mid-November 1941 the regiment was redeployed, with 356 Bty moving to east Preston.

In November 1942, 356 Battery handed over its searchlight sites and went into training prior to becoming an independent battery for overseas service. By January 1943, 356 Bty had completed mobile and battle training, and was temporarily attached to 59th S/L Rgt manning sites near Edinburgh. It became an independent battery on 20 February 1943.

=== Independent Battery ===
By May 1943 the threat from German air raids had receded, and a number of searchlight units were reduced or converted to other roles. 39th S/L Regiment HQ was reduced to a cadre and took no further part in the war. By this time, the battery had been designated 356 (Independent) Searchlight Battery, RA but continued to wear Lancashire Fusiliers' badges and buttons.

In April and May 1943 the battery underwent mobile training at Kinloss in Scotland and at Thurstaston on the Wirral, then in June it moved to Margate in Kent to begin training in cooperation with heavy anti-aircraft (HAA) guns under 74th AA Brigade, one of the formations preparing for Operation Overlord, the planned Allied invasion of Normandy. In the autumn it moved to Northampton and later Warwick, using Air Defence of Great Britain searchlight positions for training in cooperation with Royal Air Force night fighters and providing 'Canopy' coverage over VPs such as airfields.

In February 1944, 356 S/L Bty came under the command of 105th AA Brigade (another Overlord formation). In April the battery painted white Allied stars on its vehicles and moved to Southend-on-Sea for final preparations for the invasion; meanwhile its S/L crews were deployed to provide 'Canopy' coverage at RAF Twinwood Farm and RAF Coltishall. Late in the month, the whole battery moved into sealed camps in the invasion force's concentration area.

=== Normandy ===
Battery HQ and advanced parties of the S/L Troops embarked on LSTs at Southampton between 31 May and 4 June, and began landing on the King Beach sector of Gold Beach late on D-Day (6 June), although they were unable get any searchlights ashore before darkness fell. A Troop had seven lights (out of a planned 16) in operation by 20.30 on D + 1, in time for an air raid at 23.30. The first light exposed, A3, 'went straight up on a Ju 88'. The following night, with 15 lights in action, B6 caught a Heinkel He 111 and passed it to a succession of S/Ls while all the AA guns on land and sea fired, bringing it down in flames. The battery was operating under 76th AA Brigade, responsible for the AA defence of the Gold beachhead, the Mulberry harbour under construction at Arromanches, and the oil terminal at Port-en-Bessin.

C Troop and the remainder of the frontline elements of the battery arrived on Motor Transports from Southend on 9 June (D + 3), but the vehicles could not be landed until the next day. (The Royal Electrical and Mechanical Engineers workshop, Royal Corps of Signals section and rear echelon vehicles did not arrive until some weeks later.) Over succeeding nights the S/Ls were in use against nuisance raids over the beachhead, with some casualties suffered from the bombing. The lights forced the Luftwaffe to attack from greater height. From 14 June the battery also operated one S/L as an 'Orbit' beacon for RAF night fighters.

90 cm Projector Anti-Aircraft displayed at Fort Nelson, Portsmouth

On 12 July (D + 36) the routine for 356 Bty was broken when it was ordered to send three S/L detachments to cooperate with 474 (Ind) S/L Bty in providing 'artificial moonlight' for a tank concentration in the forward area. Apart from AA defence, mobile 90 cm searchlights were used in the North West Europe campaign to reflect light off the cloudbase to provide artificial moonlight or 'movement light' (also known as 'Monty's moonlight', after the commander of 21st Army Group, Gen Bernard Montgomery) in support of night operations. After the test carried out by 356 and 474 Btys, the newly arrived 344th (Ind) S/L Bty used the technique operationally for the first time to assist the assembly of 15th (Scottish) Division for Operation Greenline on the night of 14/15 July.

Meanwhile, S/L positions were in action nightly, and during the day were frequently subject to ground attack, to which they responded with Light machine guns. S/L detachments were routinely equipped with Bren guns for close AA defence, but in July they began to receive 20 mm Polsten guns. On 26 July the eight S/Ls of B Troop were sent to operate round the recently captured town of Caen under command of 100th AA Brigade. The bridges over the Caen Canal were under regular night air attack, causing casualties among the S/L crews, and the S/L positions were also under shellfire. B Troop was relieved by 557 (Ind) S/L Bty at the end of July.

=== North West Europe ===
After 21st Army Group's breakout from the Normandy beachhead at the end of August 1944, AA units began leap-frogging forwards. By 4 September, 76th AA Bde, including 356 Bty, was relieving the frontline troops in providing AA defence for Amiens and along the River Somme. The battery was relieved in turn on 22 September, and moved up to reinforce 107th AA Brigade in the Siege of Dunkirk. Here the task was to counter Luftwaffe bombers attempting to drop supplies to the German garrison. 356 S/L Bty was withdrawn from the Dunkirk siege lines on 1 November, and on 10 November a troop of the battery joined 74th AA Bde guarding Grave bridge.

On 4 November C Troop was detached to 51st (Highland) Division for its first experience with artificial moonlight. This was for an assault crossing of the Afwateringkanal and River Maas and subsequent bridgelaying. The troop stayed on to illuminate repairs to the bridge on the second night. After a difficult move, with several vehicles ditched, the troop was repositioned to join 474 S/L Bty in supporting a night move by 154 Bde into Nederweert on 9 November, during which the troop suffered minor damage from enemy shellfire. After a few nights providing movement light over canal and river bridges, XXX Corps sent C Troop to assist 84th US Division in its attack on Geilenkirchen as part of Operation Clipper. During the preparation period the S/Ls were exposed each night 'to fox the Boche' with 'stooge' beams in different directions. The attack went in at 04.00 on 18 November and the troop provided artificial moonlight until 07.00 to help the Flail tanks and engineers to breach the defences. The following night the troop assisted 43rd (Wessex) Division in the continuing attacks on the Geilenkirchen salient, receiving a retaliatory air raid that caused no damage. Heavy rain fell from 20 November onwards, and finding suitable S/L positions in the mud and minefields was difficult. Eventually the Troop deployed on a Hitler Youth campsite and at the railway station. As 84th Division's operation continued with the capture of Tripsrath, the lights attracted increasing amounts of enemy shellfire, causing minor casualties and damage. On 23 November the S/Ls were doused for a while to allow stretcher bearers to bring in the wounded. On 24 November a US S/L unit arrived to be briefed on the artificial moonlight technique, and the following day C Troop left 84th US Division and rejoined 43rd (Wessex) to resume routine movement light duties.

By the end of November, two troops were at the Grave and Mook bridges, while Battery HQ and the remainder of the battery were with 106th AA Brigade guarding river and canal crossings at Geleen and Maastricht in XXX Corps' area. From 17 December until 344 Bty relieved 356 Bty on 22 December, there was increased enemy air activity over the Maas bridges in connection with the German Ardennes Offensive.

=== Moonlight Battery ===
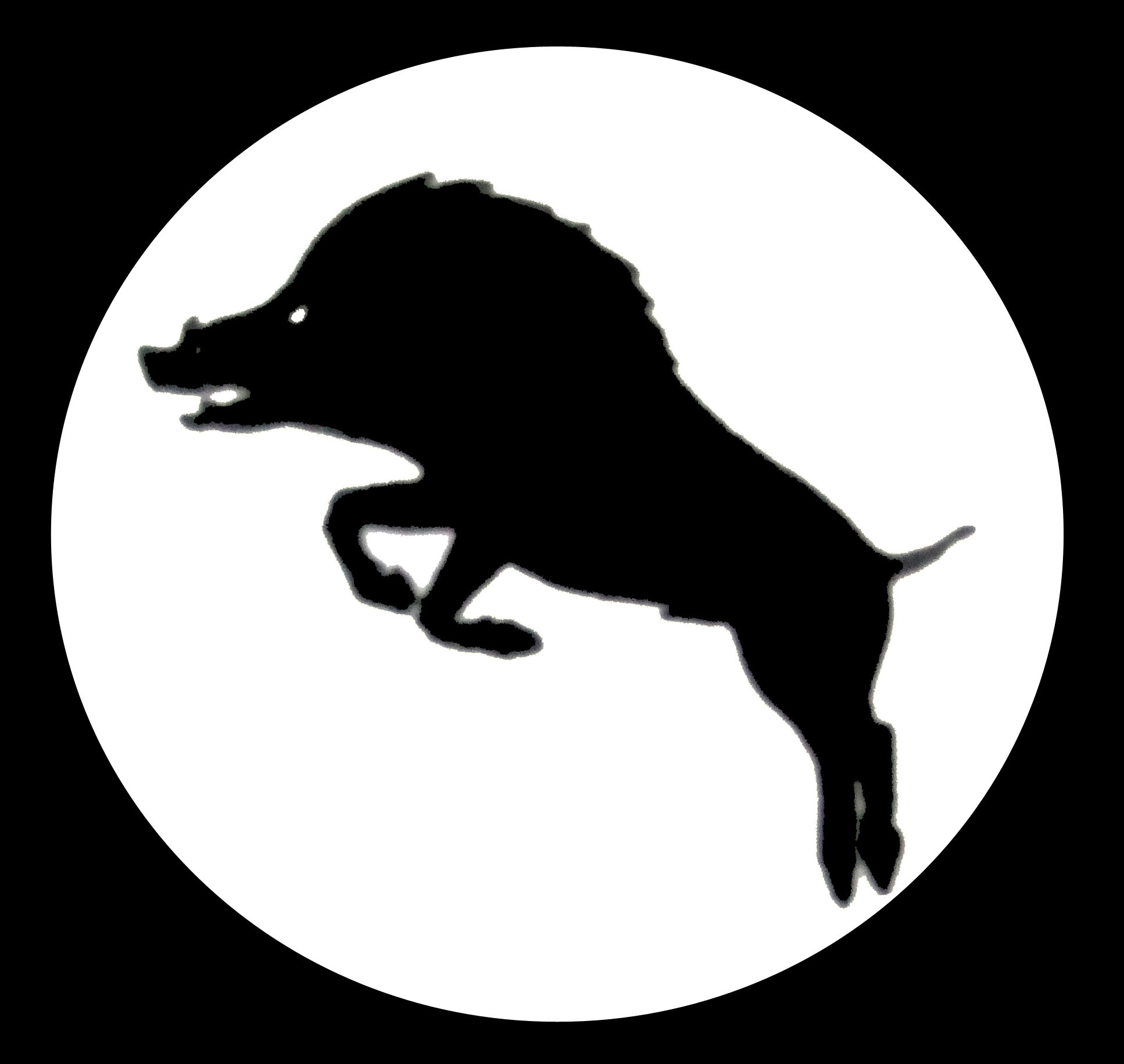
XXX Corps' shoulder flash

At the beginning of January 1945, 356 Bty moved to Namur to join 106th AA Bde supporting XXX Corps for the forthcoming Operation Veritable. A Troop provided artificial moonlight to assist bridgebuilding by the sappers of 6th Airborne Division and the battery provided low-intensity movement light for the Corps assembly areas. When Veritable opened on 9 February, 356 Bty also had 557 Bty under its command, with one troop supporting 3rd Canadian Division and the other two providing movement light on the roads. For the attacks on the Siegfried line (Westwall) bunkers, which took place on the night of D/D +1, part of the Klever Reichswald was floodlit, and some S/L positions were sited with the intention of dazzling the defenders while lighting up the obstacles.

After their success in Veritable, 356 and the other S/L batteries providing movement light were redesignated 'Moonlight' batteries and assigned to corps. 356th Moonlight Battery continued with XXX Corps, whose commander, Lt-Gen Brian Horrocks, had highly commended the battery. However, in mid-March, while the battery was preparing for the Rhine crossing (Operation Plunder), it was ordered to revert to AA duties and transfer to 107 AA Bde under First Canadian Army. The whole battery, together with Horrocks and his Corps Commander Royal Artillery, resisted the transfer, and the battery continued planning for Plunder 'as if nothing had happened', while taking the precaution of refitting its lights with AA radar. Members of the battery were given permission to wear the XXX Corps wild boar (or 'Old Pig') shoulder flash for the Rhine crossing.

Trials of various S/L arrangements were carried out on the River Maas, and the plan decided on was for four banks of lights, one behind the assembly areas, two interspersed among them, and one well forward, close to the west bank of the river, a total of 33 S/L projectors per corps. As part of the deception plan, artificial moonlight was deployed randomly along the Rhine for some nights prior to the assault, to accustom the Germans to it. A, B and C Troops were assigned to go forward with 43rd (Wessex) Division, Guards Armoured Division and 51st (Highland) Division respectively, while 582 M/L Bty, under operational command of 356 Bty, was with XXX Corps HQ. H-Hour for Plunder was 21.00 on 23 March, and at first only C Troop supporting 51st (Highland) Division was committed, with its radio communications assisted by reconnaissance cars of the Derbyshire Yeomanry. The assault waves of amphibious Buffaloes and DD Shermans began moving down to their crossing points under the movement light. By 27 March, after the success of the crossings, A and C Troops were operating on the east side of the river.

The Luftwaffe made determined efforts to destroy the bridges being built behind the assault troops, and were engaged at night by AA fire directed both by searchlight and by radar. On 29 March, 356 Bty did finally transfer to 107 AA Bde for AA defence of the II Canadian Corps crossing at Emmerich, except A Troop, which continued in the movement light and 'fighting light' role with 43rd (Wessex) Division as it advanced into Germany. By mid April the Rhine was already a 'back area', and 107 AA Bde advanced with the Canadians to the coast. On 24 April, 356 deployed Troops and Sections with batteries from 109th HAA Regiment to light and control the channels into the port of Emden. The battery was under the command of 5th Canadian Armoured Division when the German surrender at Lüneburg Heath came on 4 May.

The battery was thereafter engaged in occupation duties in Germany. The War Diary reports on 1 August 1945 that 'Minden Day was celebrated as well as it was possible to do so with the Bty so widely deployed'. It was disbanded on 31 May 1946.

== External sources ==
- Royal Artillery 1939–1945
