= Cross Lane drill hall =

Military building in Salford, England

- Salford
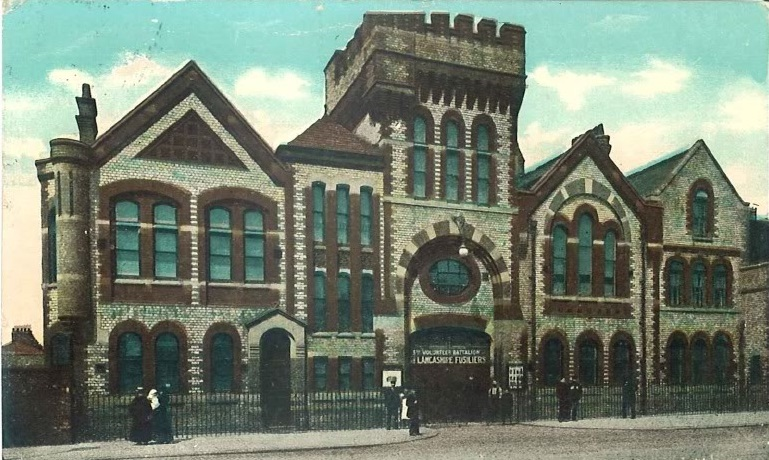
- Cross Lane drill hall

Site information
- Type: Drill hall

Location
- Location within Greater Manchester
- Coordinates: 53.48105°N 2.28134°W

Site history
- Built: 1899
- Built for: War Office
- In use: 1899-1960s

The Cross Lane drill hall was a military installation in Salford, England.

== History ==
The building, which was designed by John Eaton, Sons, & Cantrell as the headquarters of the 3rd Volunteer Battalion Lancashire Fusiliers and built by Edwin Marshall & Sons, was opened by Colonel Lees Knowles in December 1899. The unit evolved to become the 7th and 8th Battalions of the Lancashire Fusiliers in 1908. The battalions were mobilised at the drill hall in August 1914 before being deployed to Gallipoli and ultimately to the Western Front. The 7th Battalion converted to become the 39th (The Lancashire Fusiliers) AA Battalion, RE, at the Cross Lane drill hall in 1936 but moved to Flixton in spring 1940 while the 8th Battalion was disbanded shortly after the Second World War. The drill hall, being surplus to requirements, was decommissioned and then demolished in the 1960s.
