= 7th Battalion, Lancashire Fusiliers =

UK Territorial Army unit

7th Battalion, Lancashire Fusiliers 39th (Lancashire Fusiliers) Searchlight Regiment
- Active: 1908–1967
- Country: United Kingdom
- Branch: Territorial Army
- Type: Infantry Battalion; Searchlight Regiment
- Part of: Lancashire Fusiliers
- Garrison/HQ: Salford
- Anniversaries: Minden Day
- Engagements: First World War: Gallipoli; Egypt; Western Front; Second World War: Liverpool Blitz; Operation Diver; North West Europe

The 7th Battalion, Lancashire Fusiliers, was a volunteer unit of Britain's Territorial Army from 1908 until 1967. Raised in Salford, Greater Manchester, it fought as infantry at Gallipoli, in Egypt and on the Western Front during the First World War. It served as a searchlight unit during the Second World War, particularly during the 'Liverpool Blitz', and continued in an air defence role postwar.

== Origin ==
The origin of the 7th Lancashire Fusiliers lies in the 56th Lancashire Rifle Volunteers of four companies, formed at Salford on 5 March 1860 as part of the enthusiasm for joining local Rifle Volunteer Corps (RVCs) following an invasion scare. When the RVCs were consolidated the 56th Lancashire was renumbered 17th on 3 September 1880, and in the following year, under the Childers Reforms, RVCs were attached to Regular Army regiments. The 17th Lancashire became a Volunteer Battalion of the Manchester Regiment on 1 July 1881 without changing its title, but on 1 March 1886 it transferred to the Lancashire Fusiliers as its 3rd Volunteer Battalion. In December 1899 the Cross Lane drill hall in Salford was opened and occupied by the battalion. Some 117 volunteers from the battalion served in the 2nd Boer War, earning the Battle honour South Africa 1900–1902.

== Territorial Force ==
On the formation of the Territorial Force (TF) under the Haldane Reforms in 1908, the 3rd VB formed two battalions of the Lancashire Fusiliers, the 7th and 8th. The two battalions continued to share the Drill Hall at Cross Lane, Salford, and formally separated on 24 January 1914. Previously, the Lancashire Fusiliers' VBs had been part of the North Lancashire Volunteer Infantry Brigade; now they formed a full brigade in their own right (the Lancashire Fusiliers Brigade in the East Lancashire Division).

== First World War ==
On the outbreak of war, the units of the East Lancashire Division were at their annual training camps. They received the order to mobilise at 17.30 on 4 August, and returned to their battalion HQs, where the men were billeted close by. On 10 August the TF was invited to volunteer for overseas service, and within a few days 90 per cent of the division had accepted. On 20 August the division moved into camps for training, with 7th Lancashire Fusiliers at Turton, and on 9 September it entrained for Southampton to embark for Egypt. The division began to disembark at Alexandria on 25 September and the Lancashire Fusiliers Brigade concentrated for training round Cairo. At first their role was simply to relieve Regular troops from the garrison for service on the Western Front, but on 5 November Britain declared war on the Ottoman Empire and Egypt became a war zone. The East Lancashire Division went to guard the Suez Canal.

Meanwhile, those men who had not volunteered for overseas service, or were unfit, remained at Salford to help train the flood of recruits coming in. On 31 August 1914, the formation of Reserve or 2nd Line units for each existing TF unit was authorised, and the men at Salford became the 2/7th Bn, after which the parent battalion was designated the 1/7th. Later a 3/7th Bn was raised to provide reinforcements for the 1st and 2nd Line.

=== 1/7th Battalion ===
==== Gallipoli ====
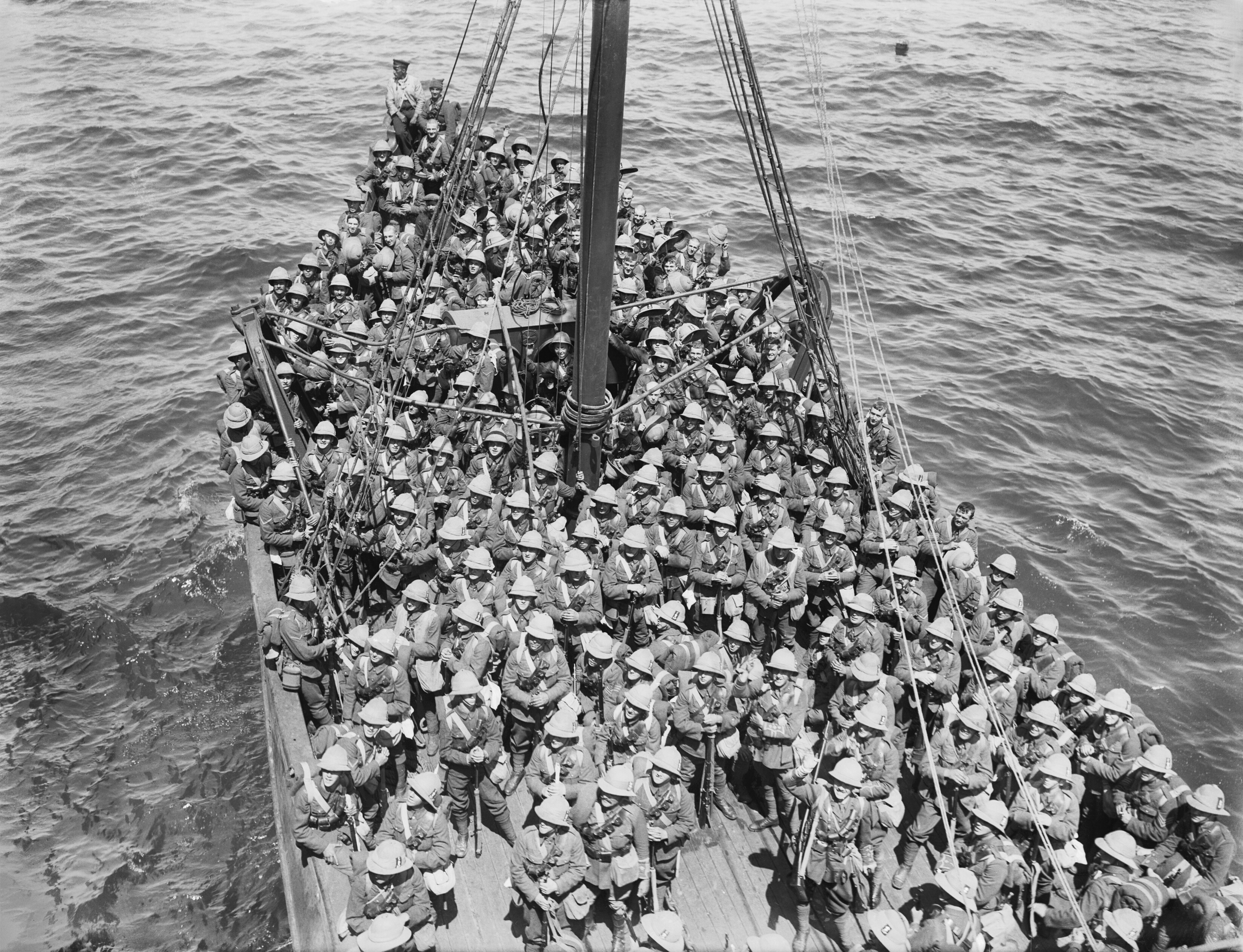
A boat carrying men of 125th (Lancashire Fusiliers) Brigade ashore at Cape Helles, May 1915. Photo by Ernest Brooks

After a period spent in the canal defences, the battalion embarked on SS Nile at Alexandria between 1 and 6 May 1915 for the Gallipoli Peninsula and disembarked at 'W' Beach at Cape Helles, where Allied troops had landed a few days earlier. The Lancashire Fusilier Brigade was the first part of the division to go into action, temporarily attached to the 29th Division for the Second Battle of Krithia on 6 May. The 1/7th supported an attack by the 1/6th Bn and the following day moved forward through the captured line, but was forced to retire after two attempts to take Gurkha Bluff. The battalion was relieved at sundown.

The Lancashire Fusiliers Brigade then reverted to the East Lancashire Division, which later that month was numbered as the 42nd (East Lancashire) Division, when the brigade became the 125th (Lancashire Fusiliers) Brigade. For the next three weeks there was little actual fighting, and the brigade occupied part of the Redoubt Line. On 4 June it took part in the Third Battle of Krithia, where the 1/7th moved up from divisional reserve to join the fighting, but was more heavily engaged on 6 June in fending off Turkish counter-attacks. The battalion suffered 179 casualties.

During July the battalion took turns in holding the front and support lines, apart from a brief relief (8–13 July) to the island of Imbros. On 4 August it moved into the Redoubt Line and on 7 August to the front line at Krithia Road to take part in the Battle of Krithia Vineyard. The fighting was 'a singularly brainless and suicidal type of warfare', and virtually nothing was achieved in any of these attacks, at the cost of heavy casualties. Two brigades of 42nd Division attacked on the second day of the Krithia Vineyard battle: 'By nightfall both brigades were back in their old lines, with the exception of some parties of the 6th and 7th Lancashire Fusiliers, who defended the Vineyard against repeated Turkish attacks until, after a bitter and pointless struggle during the following five days, a trench dug across the centre of this worthless tract of scrub became the British front line'. The battalion war diary notes that the men were 'thoroughly worn out; and that out of a strength of 410 NCOs and men, only 139 returned when they were relieved. Three Distinguished Conduct Medals were awarded to members of the battalion.

After this failure, the Helles front was shut down and no further attacks were made. The 1/7th Bn took turns in the front and reserve lines at Gully Ravine, Gully Beach and Gully Spur, losing several men buried when the Turks exploded a mine at Cawley's Crater. In October the 1/7th was temporarily amalgamated with the 1/6th Lancashire Fusiliers due to casualties and sickness.

Throughout the first two weeks of December, the 1/7th Bn dug and sniped its way forwards by slow and steady stages. On 14 December the 1/7th was occupying Cawley's Crater when a patrol detected an enemy mine-shaft at the Gridiron, just 6 yards from the battalion's position. The following day a party led by Capt A.W. Boyd successfully laid and exploded a charge in the enemy mine-shaft. A decision had been made to evacuate the Peninsula, beginning on 16 December. A small operation was laid on at the Gridiron for that day as a diversion. The attacking force under Capt Boyd was drawn from 1/7th Bn, supported by 1/2nd West Lancashire Field Company, Royal Engineers and by 1/6th Bn behind using catapults to throw grenades. A mine was exploded on the far side of the crater, blowing in the Turkish trench and extending the crater, and the storming party occupied the trench and advanced some way along it in both directions, erecting barricades. That evening a Turkish counter-attack drove them out, but Boyd organised a fresh attack, supported by a bombing team from the Sussex Yeomanry, and regained the position within 15 minutes – the bombing teams had to be restrained from penetrating too far down the trenches in pursuit. The VIII Corps commander (Lt-Gen Sir Francis Davies) officially named the position 'Boyd's Crater'.

The 1/7th Bn moved down to 'W' Beach on 27 December and sailed aboard the SS Ermine for Mudros and then to Egypt, landing at Alexandria on 15 January 1916. Its battle casualties for the Gallipoli campaign had been 7 officers and 242 other ranks, but the numbers hospitalised for sickness were considerably higher.

==== Egypt ====
The 42nd Division settled into No 3 Section of the Suez Canal defences at Kantara until 4 August when a Turkish attack began the Battle of Romani. The division entrained for Pelusium. The following day the British sallied out from their entrenched positions to support the ANZAC Mounted Division in pursuing the enemy. However, the 42nd was untrained in desert conditions, and suffered badly from heat and thirst in the Sinai Desert: large numbers fell out and there were many deaths. The infantry pursuit was ineffective and the enemy retreated in good order.

In December 1916, the Egyptian Expeditionary Force began its advance across Sinai to attack the Turkish forces in Palestine. 42nd Division's units were protecting the lines of communication, and on 13 December took part in a practice attack. However, after reaching El Arish, the division received orders on 28 January 1917 to transfer to the Western Front. On 22 February it began embarking at Alexandria for Marseille, landing on 27 February.

==== Ypres ====
The move of the 42nd Division to France was completed on 15 March, and on 8 April it went into the line near Épehy, the 1/7th being the first battalion to enter the line. The division remained in that sector until 8 July, when it moved to the Ypres Salient. From 23 August until the end of the month the infantry were behind the line at Poperinghe, training to take part in the Third Ypres Offensive then under way. On 1 September the division went into the line near Frezenberg Ridge, and on 6 September the Lancashire Fusiliers made an unsuccessful attempt to capture the fortified Iberian, Borry and Beck Farms; the 1/7th was not in the attack, but still suffered casualties, particularly among a carrying party supporting the 1/5th Bn. The division's infantry were relieved and returned for rest at Poperinghe on 18 September, then moved to the Nieuport area until November.

==== Spring Offensive ====
During the winter, the division held the line near Givenchy, constructing defences on the new principle of 'defended localities' in anticipation of the German spring offensive. On 12 February a patrol from 1/7th Bn detected a German mine-shaft, and fetched a demolition party to destroy it. When the German attack came on 21 March the division was in General Headquarters reserve, but it was moved into the line to relieve 40th Division and defend against the north wing of the German offensive (the 1st Battle of Bapaume). On the morning of 25 March the Germans pushed through 40th Division to Sapignies: a company of 1/7th Bn and part of 1/5th Bn Lancashire Fusiliers tried to check this advance and were subjected to fire from massed machine guns and a field artillery battery until support arrived and Sapignies was regained. The remainder of 1/7th Bn was dug in on the ridge to the north, and was also heavily attacked.

Despite having held its positions, both of 42nd Division's flanks were 'in the air' and it had to withdraw the following day, retiring to Bucquoy to continue the defence during the 1st Battle of Arras (28 March). They were in old, dilapidated trenches, but held the line, and the German advance was checked. The division was relieved on the night of 29/30 March. It returned to the front line on 1/2 April near Ayete and the following night 125th Bde raided a new enemy strongpoint. At 05.00 on 5 April heavy shelling with high explosive and poison gas on the brigade front heralded the opening of the Battle of the Ancre. Although half of 1/8th Lancashire Fusiliers was overrun, 1/7th Bn and the remainder were able to hold their ground. Supported by 1/5th Bn forming a defensive flank, the battalion fought a bitter battle all day, until the enemy advance was brought to a standstill that evening.

The division was withdrawn for rest and refit, returning to a quiet sector of the line around Gommecourt, where they refortified parts of the old Somme battlefield and helped to train newly arrived US Army troops. On 17 July, 1/7th Bn carried out a successful daylight raid on enemy lines, and Private G. Heardley distinguished himself in two further attacks on 22 and 24 July; he was awarded the DCM.

==== Hundred Days ====
On 21 August 1918 the 42nd Division joined in the Second Battle of the Somme by attacking towards Miraumont in the Battle of Albert. 125th Brigade captured a strongpoint named 'The Lozenge', after which 1/7th Lancashire Fusiliers was tasked with taking the second objective, 'The Dovecot'. When the morning mist cleared, the battalion 'found that they were advancing upon an enemy battery, which opened fire at point-blank range. An attempt was made to hold a shell-hole position but the enemy was in strong force, and a fierce counter-attack practically wiped out the defenders. However, in the course of the afternoon a joint attack by the two brigades drove the enemy from the entire line of the final objective, the 7th L.F., assisted by two machine-gun sections, capturing the Dovecot'. However, in a pre-dawn counter-attack the following morning the Germans overran the battalion's outposts and recaptured the Dovecot, until they were halted on a line just to the west that the battalion had consolidated the previous night. The division recaptured the Dovecot on 23 August and pushed on across the River Ancre to Miraumont.

After two days' rest (26–27 August) the division returned to the attack in the Second Battle of Bapaume, and by 3 September it was advancing across open country in pursuit of the enemy until they reached the line of the Canal du Nord. Considerable resistance was met with at Neuville-Bourjonval and a trench system beyond. A company of 1/7th Bn, supported by a Box barrage laid down by B company of the 42nd Machine Gun Bn, attacked these trenches on the afternoon of 5 September. 'The attack was brilliantly successful, the trench system being captured and more than 100 prisoners taken, with very slight loss to the company'. The 42nd Division was withdrawn for rest that night.

On the opening day of the Battle of the Canal du Nord (27 September), 42nd Division failed to achieve its objectives, the 1/7th and 1/8th Bns being 'exposed to a terrible enfilading fire from the high ground around Beaucamp, and the leading companies were practically blotted out ... With great gallantry the two battalions persisted in face of a murderous fire, but the failure to drive the enemy out of Beaucamp made it impossible for the Fusiliers to get beyond their first objective ... until towards midday'. However, on the second day (28 September) 125th Brigade went forward at 02.30 and caught the enemy by surprise. The attack was completely successful, rolling up the Hindenburg Line defences and taking many prisoners. Resuming the attack the following morning, the brigade reached the division's objective of Welsh Ridge.

After a short rest the division marched up to the advancing front line and on 12 October relieved the New Zealand Division, which had established a bridgehead across the River Selle at Briastre. For the next 10 days 125th Bde held this position against heavy counter-attacks and shelling. The other two brigades then attacked through them on 20 October, taking all their objectives. The Battle of the Selle ended on 23 October with a full-scale advance, led for 42nd Division by 125th Bde with 1/7th Bn on the right. The 1/7th met the fiercest opposition and were held up, the troops suffering heavy casualties from enemy shellfire while forming up, and the enemy held the Beaurain ridge stoutly. But the attack was supported by two stray tanks from a neighbouring brigade, and the Lancashire Fusiliers took their successive objectives between 04.45 and 08.00. Lieutenant W.J. O'Bryen won a rare second bar to his MC by leading his men round by a flank and capturing a machine gun nest that was holding them up.

The division was then withdrawn into reserve and halted around Beauvois-en-Cambrésis from 24 October until the advance was resumed on 3 November. The 42nd Division moved up through Le Quesnoy and the Forest of Mormal and relieved the New Zealanders on 6 November. The advance was continued through Hautmont on 8 November, but 125 Bde was unable to cross the Sambre because the pontoons had not arrived, so it retraced its steps to its overnight billets near Pont sur Sambre and crossed there. The Fusiliers then forced back the enemy rearguards, and after dark its patrols went forward and the 1/7th Bn cleared them off the high ground near Fort d'Hautmont, one of the outer forts of the Fortress of Maubeuge.

Early on the morning of 9 November, patrols of 1/7th Bn went forward and found that the enemy had gone. After the sappers had bridged the Sambre, the battalion pushed outposts beyond the Maubeuge–Avesnes-sur-Helpe road, taking over the whole divisional front while the rest of the battalions were withdrawn into billets. In the evening the 1/7th's patrols entered Ferrière and Les Trieux – nearly two miles beyond the outpost line – and captured three trains full of munitions, together with a lorry and machine guns. On 10 November the battalion took over the outposts of the whole corps frontage. This was the end of the fighting, because the Armistice with Germany came into the effect the following day. In December the division moved into quarters in the Charleroi area and by mid-March 1919 most of its troops had gone home for demobilisation. 1/7th Lancashire Fusiiers was formally disembodied on 18 April 1919.

The divisional history lists 27 officers (including those attached) and 540 other ranks of the 1/7th Bn who were killed, died of wounds or sickness, or were posted missing during the war.

==== Commanding Officers ====
The following officers commanded 1/7th Lancashire Fusiliers during the First World War:

- Lt-Col A.F. Maclure, TD, 17 September 1913 – 6 May 1915.
- Lt-Col C.T. Alexander, DSO, 5 May–24 September, 10 November–1 December 1915.
- Maj M.R.P.W. Gledhill, MC, (Royal Irish Regiment), 25 September–31 October; 20 December 1915 – 2 February 1916.
- Maj W.J. Law, 2–9 November; 2–19 December 1915 (killed)
- Lt-Col H.C. Woodcock (6th Bn Gloucestershire Regiment) 3 February–8 August 16 – 28 August 1916
- Maj E.W. Lennard (6th Bn Gloucestershire Regiment) 9–15 August 1916
- Lt-Col W.E. Maskell (Devonshire Regiment) 29 August 1916 – 12 September 1917
- Lt-Col G.S. Brewis, DSO and Bar, (Welsh Regiment) 13 September 1917 – 25 October 1918; 28 January 1919 to disembodiment
- Lt-Col T.J. Kelly, DSO, MC, (Manchester Regiment) 26 October 1918 – 27 January 1919

=== 2/7th Battalion ===
After the 1st East Lancashire Division had embarked for Egypt, the formation of its 2nd Line was pushed forwards. A large number of volunteers came from Salford Corporation Transport employees, including tram drivers and guards. Recruiting was carried out in Salford, Pendleton and surrounding areas. Large drafts came from Bury and Radcliffe, and later from Cheshire and Wales. The battalion went to Mossborough for training in September, and then into billets in Southport in October.

The 2nd Lancashire Fusilier Brigade was numbered as the 197th (2/1st Lancashire Fusilier) Brigade in August 1915 when the 2nd East Lancashire Division became the 66th (2nd East Lancashire) Division. There was a shortage of instructors, weapons and equipment. Eventually, the men were issued with .256-in Japanese Ariska rifles with which to train. These were not replaced with Lee-Enfield rifles until the end of 1915.

Preliminary training of the division had been made harder by the need to supply drafts to the 1st Line overseas, and it was not until August 1915 that the 66th Division concentrated round Crowborough in Sussex, moving to Tunbridge Wells in October. It now formed part of Second Army of Central Force and all the Home Service men had been posted away, so that it could train for overseas service. However, training continued to be delayed by the provision of drafts. In 1916 the division was transferred to Southern Army of Home Forces and made responsible for a portion of the East Coast defences, with the 2/7th based at Hyderabad Barracks, Colchester. It was not until January 1917 that the 66th was deemed ready to go overseas (the last TF division to do so).

Embarkation orders were received on 11 February, the battalion landed at Le Havre on 28 February, and by 16 March the division's units had concentrated in France. Once again, it was the 2/7th Bn that was the first into the line. From June to September the division was engaged in minor operations along the Flanders coast, but in October it moved into the Ypres Salient where it took part in the Battle of Poelcappelle (9 October). The 2/7th advanced after an exhausting 11-hour approach march; the DSO was awarded both to the Commanding Officer, Lt-Col W.A. Hobbins, (Note: His citation in the London Gazette reads: Awarded the Distinguished Service Order. Capt. (A./Lt.-Col.) Wilfred Alston Hobbins, Lan. Fus. For conspicuous gallantry and devotion to duty. By skilful leading he brought his battalion into action at a most opportune time. He behaved with the utmost resource against counter-attacks, and rallied the remnants of the front line when, being unsupported, he was compelled to withdraw.) and to his Second-in-Command, Maj. C. Alderson. (Note: Awarded the Distinguished Service Order. Maj. Christopher Alderson, Lan. Fus. For conspicuous gallantry and devotion to duty when in charge of the front line. He organised the men of all units of the brigade, who were mixed together, with energy and skill. He held on in the face of a heavy and accurate barrage.) for their work in organising a chaotic situation and driving off enemy counter-attacks.

==== Spring Offensive ====
In February the 66th Division was sent south to reinforce Fifth Army, which was badly strung out. To make best use of manpower, the divisions were deployed for defence in depth. On the opening day of the German spring offensive (21 March 1918), the 2/8th Lancashire Fusiliers in 197 Bde's Forward Zone were quickly overwhelmed by German attackers appearing out of an early morning fog. The Battle Zone was anchored on a heavily fortified quarry outside the village of Templeux-le-Guérard, held by two and a half companies of the 2/7th Lancashire Fusiliers and two companies of the divisional pioneer battalion (1/5th Border Regiment); however, this strongpoint was quickly surrounded and bypassed by the attackers, who began a furious attack on the rest of the brigade in Templeux-le-Guérard. At 3.00 pm the Germans brought up some heavy Minenwerfers, which destroyed the positions in the quarry, and at the same time they entered the quarry tunnels. Of 450 men in the quarry garrison only about 60 were left on their feet when they surrendered two hours later. That night the remnant of the brigade in Templeux-le-Guérard were overrun and most were captured.

What remained of the 66th Division – maybe only 500 fighting men by the end – retreated for a week, with one brief stand on the Somme Canal, until a line was patched up by reinforcements on 29 March. The remains of the 2/7th Bn were reduced to a cadre in April 1918, and used to train newly arrived US Army units for trench warfare. The battalion then returned to England as part of 74th Brigade, 25th Division, disembarking at Folkestone on 30 June and going to Aldershot. On 9 July, the cadre was reconstituted as 24th Bn Lancashire Fusiliers. This was a training unit based at Cromer until the end of the war; it was disbanded on 21 November 1918.

==== Commanding Officers ====
The following officers commanded 2/7th Lancashire Fusiliers during the First World War:

- Lt-Col A.J. Bailey, TD, 20 October 1914 – 9 June 1915
- Lt-Col C. Hodgkinson, VD, 10 June 1915 – 2 August 1916
- Lt-Col S.H. Hingley (Middlesex Regiment) 3 August 1916 – 15 May 1917
- Lt-Col W.A. Hobbins, DSO, 16 May 1917 – 4 January 1918
- Lt-Col E.A.S. Gell, MC, (Royal Fusiliers) 5 January–21 March 1918
- Maj C. Alderson, DSO, 21 March–10 April 1918
- Lt-Col B.A. Smith, MC, (South Nottinghamshire Hussars) 11–20 April
- Maj L.B.L. Seckham, MC, 21 April–9 May 1918
- Lt-Col G.T.B. Wilson, DSO, (Highland Light Infantry) 10 May–9 July 1918

=== 3/7th Battalion ===
The 3/7th Bn was formed on 25 March 1915 at Salford as a training unit. It went to Codford near Salisbury Plain, and then in April 1916 to Witley Camp in Surrey. On 8 April it became 7th Reserve Bn, Lancashire Fusiliers, and in September 1916 it was absorbed into the 6th Reserve Bn, in the East Lancashire Reserve Brigade at Southport. The 6th (R) Bn was later stationed at Ripon, and then at Scarborough, where it had responsibility for coast defence as well as training under-18-year-old recruits. It ended the war at Bridlington.

=== 45th Provisional Battalion ===
The Home Service men of the 7th Battalion, together with those of other TF battalions of the Manchesters and Lancashire Fusiliers, were combined into 45th Provisional Battalion, which became 28th Manchesters on 1 January 1917. It served in 73rd Division and was disbanded in 1918.

== Interwar ==
The TF was reconstituted on 7 February 1920 and the 42nd Division and its units began to reform in April. The TF was reorganised as the Territorial Army (TA) the following year. Once again it was in 125th (Lancashire Fusiliers) Bde of 42nd (East Lancashire) Division.

In the 1930s the increasing need for anti-aircraft (AA) defence for Britain's cities was addressed by converting a number of TA infantry battalions into searchlight battalions of the Royal Engineers (RE). The 7th Lancashire Fusiliers was one unit selected for this role, becoming 39th (The Lancashire Fusiliers) AA Battalion, RE in 1936. Consisting of HQ and four AA companies (354–357) at the Drill Hall, Cross Lane, Salford (355 AA Company later moved to Clifton). The battalion was subordinated to 33rd (Western) AA Group (later Brigade) in 2nd AA Division.

With the expansion of Britain's AA Defences, new formations were created, and in 1938 the battalion transferred to 44th AA Brigade based in Manchester in a new 4th AA Division.

== Second World War ==
=== 39th Searchlight Regiment ===
==== Mobilisation ====
The TA's AA units were mobilised on 23 September 1938 during the Munich Crisis, with units manning their emergency positions within 24 hours, even though many did not yet have their full complement of men or equipment. The emergency lasted three weeks, and they were stood down on 13 October. In February 1939 the existing AA defences came under the control of a new Anti-Aircraft Command. In June, as the international situation worsened, a partial mobilisation of the TA was begun in a process known as 'couverture', whereby each AA unit did a month's tour of duty in rotation to man selected AA gun and searchlight positions. On 12 August 355 AA Company mobilised to relieve 353 AA Company (from the Liverpool-based 38th (The King's Regiment) AA Bn) at 24 S/L sites across South Yorkshire and North Lincolnshire, with company HQ at Hatfield Woodhouse. 356 AA Company was nearby at Snaith, and battalion HQ was at RAF Church Fenton. However, 12 days later the whole of AA Command was fully mobilised ahead of the declaration of war. 39th AA Bn returned to Lancashire to take up its war stations.

==== Home defence ====
By the outbreak of war on 3 September the battalion was manning a few searchlights, but also using its Lewis guns to guard key points such as Manchester Ship Canal and docks, some of 354 Company being stationed on top of Barton Power Station. This continued through the period known as the 'Phoney War'. On 1 November 1939 the 39th S/L Bn was transferred to a newly formed 53rd Light Anti-Aircraft Brigade, based at Alkrington Hall.

In the spring of 1940, the battalion HQ moved from Salford to Flixton, still near Manchester, but 354 Company was detached to Boston, Lincolnshire, where it was attached to 44th (The Leicestershire Regiment) AA Bn, and 357 Company was detached to the South Coast of England, later moving to Shaftesbury in Dorset.

On 1 August 1940 the AA battalions of the RE were transferred to the Royal Artillery (RA), the 39th being designated 39th (The Lancashire Fusiliers) Searchlight Regiment, RA. The day of the formal transfer happened to be Minden Day, celebrated in all battalions of the Lancashire Fusiliers by wearing red roses. The regiment continued to wear its Lancashire Fusiliers cap badges and buttons.

Shortly afterwards, 355 and 356 Batteries (as the companies were now termed in the RA) went to Orkney, where they formed part of Orkney and Shetland Defences (OSDEF) guarding the vital Scapa Flow naval base against occasional nuisance raids and reconnaissance aircraft. 357 Battery returned to the Manchester area and then in September followed the others to Stromness in Orkney, together with Regimental HQ. 354 Battery remained detached, with half batteries deployed to Bristol and Southampton where their searchlights and Lewis guns were frequently in action against Luftwaffe air raids. The gunners were also deployed to guard property during the Bristol Blitz.

39th Searchlight Regiment returned to England in April 1941, sailing from Kirkwall to Aberdeen, and then entraining for Liverpool, where it rejoined 53 AA Bde in 4 AA Division, and where 354 Bty had been stationed since the beginning of the year. The regiment arrived just in time for a series of heavy night air raids that devastated the city of Liverpool ('the May Blitz'). The newly arrived searchlight crews were continuously in action, some stationed in the docks area that was a particular target of these raids. Some of the regiment's lights were mounted on two motor vessels named Fiat and Castor.

Enemy activity died away after May, and opportunities were taken for training and equipment upgrades. In August 1941, the regiment began trials with Searchlight Control (SLC) radar, and by the end of the year women of the Auxiliary Territorial Service (ATS) were being trained to take more responsible roles within the regiment. In mid-November the regiment was redeployed, with 354 Bty in Liverpool, 355 and 356 moving to west and east Preston respectively, and 357 to training camp.

On 23 January 1942 357 Bty was transferred to 56th (5th Battalion, Cameronian Scottish Rifles) S/L Rgt. In April 1942, 354 Bty was converted into a mobile searchlight battery and moved away to Peterborough, and regimental HQ shifted to Myerscough House near Preston the following month. In June, the ATS attached to the regiment were formed into a separate company.

In November 1942, 356 Battery handed over its searchlight sites [to 556 Bty] and went into training prior to becoming an independent battery for overseas service. The following month, 354 Bty at Peterborough was formally re-regimented with 69th S/L Rgt. Regimental HQ moved to Todmorden and took over control of 435 S/L Bty (from 62nd S/L Rgt) and 499 S/L Bty (from 78th S/L Rgt). 435 Bty was soon replaced by 423 Bty (57th (8th Battalion, Cameronian Scottish Rifles) S/L Rgt), and that in turn by 474 Bty (76th S/L Rgt), which was just completing mobile training.

By January 1943, 356 Bty had completed mobile and battle training, and was temporarily attached to 59th S/L Rgt manning sites near Edinburgh. 474 Bty on arrival took over some AA sites, but also anti-minelaying sites on the Mersey and at Barrow-in-Furness. It formally became an independent battery on 20 February. By early 1943 the threat from Luftwaffe air raids in Northern England had receded, and a number of searchlight units were reduced or converted to other roles. A reorganisation of 53 AA Bde in February saw all its S/L units move away, except 39th S/L Rgt HQ and 474 Bty, which occupied the remaining 24 sites. 355 Bty moved to 27 AA Bde in 2 AA Group on the South Coast, and 499 Bty to 67 AA Bde in 3 AA Group. RHQ moved from Todmorden, first to Maghull on Merseyside, and then in March to Swansea in 61 AA Bde's area to act as a headquarters for independent S/L batteries, including 557 S/L Bty.

==== Disbandment ====
However, in April, AA Command deemed 39th S/L Regiment to be surplus to requirements and ordered it to be disbanded, together with 355 Bty. By now, 356, 474 and 557 Btys had become independent mobile units destined for the invasion of Europe (Operation Overlord), and 357 Bty had been converted into 414 Light Anti-Aircraft (LAA) Battery. The Commanding Officer argued that disbandment would be contrary to the constitution of 7th Bn Lancashire Fusiliers, so instead on 31 May 39th S/L Regiment was reduced to a cadre of one officer and four other ranks and reverted to infantry as 7th Bn LF; it was not assigned to a fighting formation and officially passed into suspended animation on 31 May. Its remaining original batteries (354, 356 and 414 LAA) continued to wear the LF regimental badges and buttons.

==== Commanding officers ====
The following officers commanded 39th S/L Rgt during the Second World War:

- Lt-Col J. Allen from outbreak of war to 29 June 1940, when he was posted to 36th AA Bn.
- Lt-Col A.V. Gordon-Dower from 29 June 1940 to 7 July 1941.
- Lt-Col R.R. Rainsford, TD, from 7 July 1941 until disbandment; on 5 July 1943 when he was posted to command 69th S/L Rgt (which included 354 Bty).

=== 354 Searchlight Battery ===
354 Searchlight Battery was formally re-regimented with 69th (3rd City of London) S/L Rgt in December 1942 when it was at Peterborough. It continued in an air defence role until VE Day, particularly during the V-1 flying bomb offensive (Operation Diver)

=== 355 Searchlight Battery ===
This battery was detached in February 1943, moving by train to join 27 AA Bde on the South Coast, with Battery HQ at The Grange, St Helens, East Sussex, A Troop at Lewes, B Tp at Hailsham, C Tp at Ashford, Kent, and D Tp at Adisham. The area was subject to 'Fringe' attacks by Luftwaffe fighter-bombers attacking at low level in daylight, so the allocation of Lewis guns for local defence was increased from one to four and later six per S/L site. The guns had to be manned throughout the hours of daylight. On 11 March a raid on Hastings by Focke-Wulf Fw 190s and Messerschmitt Bf 109s flew right over Battery HQ, and a raid by Bf 109s on Ashford on 24 March was engaged by one of C Tp's sites.

However, in May 1943 the battery was disbanded, the ATS personnel and specialists being posted to other units in 27 AA Bde, the remainder being posted as reinforcements to 97th and 143rd LAA Rgts. The men of A Tp were kept together as a troop in 413 LAA Bty, but the rest were split up. 143 Regiment remained in Home Forces, but 97 LAA was converted into 626 Infantry Regiment, RA, in January 1945 and ended the war on line of communication duties in North West Europe.

=== 356 Searchlight Battery ===
See separate article, 356th Moonlight Battery, Royal Artillery

356 Battery became an independent unit before the regiment was reduced to cadre, and it took part in the campaign in NW Europe, leading elements landing on D-day itself. As the campaign progressed, the searchlight units with 21st Army Group were increasingly used to provide artificial illumination, or 'Monty's Moonlight', for night operations. 356 Battery was particularly commended by Lt-Gen Brian Horrocks, commander of XXX Corps, for its work in the Klever Reichswald battles (Operation Veritable). Soon afterwards, 356 and some other S/L batteries were formally redesignated as 'Moonlight Batteries', and played a major role in the crossing of the Rhine (Operation Plunder). It was disbanded on 31 May 1945.

=== 357 Searchlight Battery ===
This battery had been transferred to 56th (5th Bn Cameronian (Scottish Rifles)) S/L Rgt on 23 January 1942, and on 18 February the regiment was converted to the Light AA role as 125th (Cameronians) LAA Rgt, with 357 S/L Bty redesignated as 414 LAA Bty. However, the battery left the regiment on 3 October, and joined 144th LAA Rgt based in Northern Ireland under 7 AA Group.

During the summer of 1944, as part of the redistribution of LAA guns under 'Operation Diver', to defend against the V-1 flying bombs aimed at London, 144th LAA Rgt was brought over to join 28 (Thames & Medway) AA Bde in 1 AA Group. At the height of the V-1 flying bomb offensive in August, 414 LAA Bty was detached to Hawkinge just inland from the Kent coast under the command of 131 LAA Rgt.

== Postwar ==
The battalion was reconstituted at Salford on 1 January 1947 as 574th (7th Bn, The Lancashire Fusiliers) (Mixed) Heavy Anti-Aircraft Regiment, Royal Artillery (TA), ('mixed' indicating that members of the ATS (Women's Royal Army Corps from 1949) were integrated into the unit). It formed part of 70 AA Bde (the former 44 AA Bde, now based in Salford).

AA Command was disbanded on 10 March 1955, and a number of mergers took place among TA air defence units. 574 HAA Regiment was amalgamated with four other HAA regiments in the Manchester area: 310 (8th Lancashire Fusiliers), 360 (based in Stockport), 465 (The Manchester Regiment), and 606 (East Lancashire). Together, they formed a new 314th Heavy Anti-Aircraft Regiment, Royal Artillery in 2nd Army Group Royal Artillery (AA). By this merger the 7th and 8th Bns Lancashire Fusiliers, both descended from the 56th Lancashire RVC, were brought back together. They formed Q (Salford) Battery in the new regiment.

On 1 May 1961, Q Battery transferred to 253 Field Regiment (The Bolton Artillery). Since the reduction of the TA in 1967, the Bolton Artillery has existed as a battery of 103 (Lancashire Artillery Volunteers) Regiment RA, but it no longer has a presence in Salford.

== Heritage & Ceremonial ==
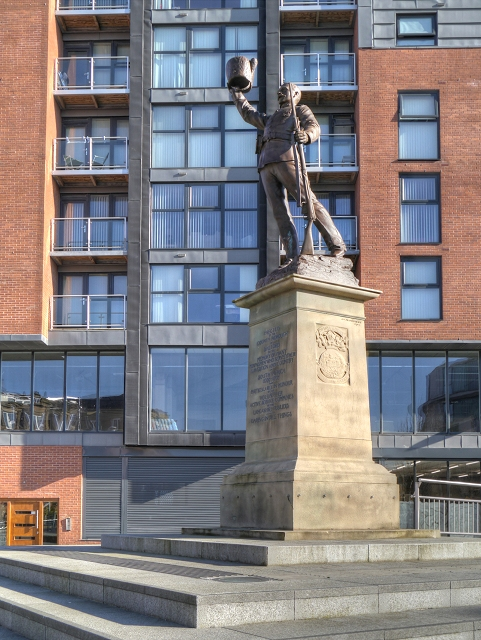

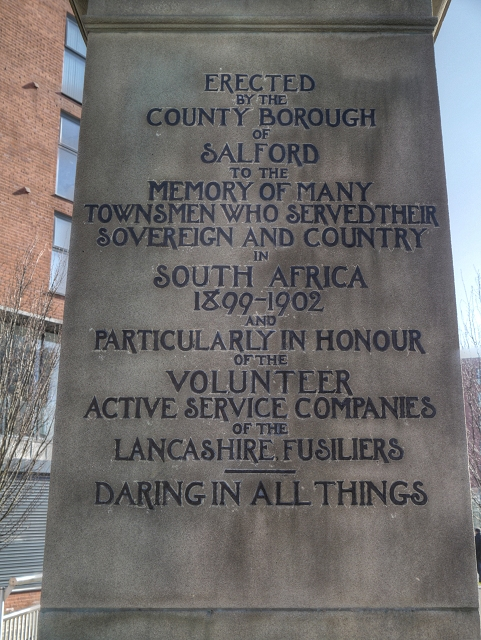

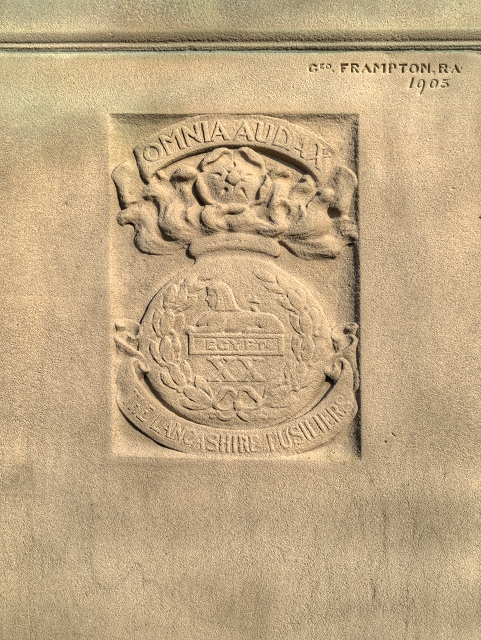
The Salford Boer War memorial

=== Insignia ===
Battalion signs were introduced in 1916, worn on the upper arm and on vehicles. The 1/7th wore a red diamond bearing the figure '7' in white, on both sleeves. The 2/7th wore a yellow diamond on both sleeves (1.75" per side, in cotton).

39th Searchlight Regiment (and later its independent batteries) continued to wear Lancashire Fusiliers badges and buttons after transfer to the RE and then to the RA. At the time of transfer from the RE to the RA, it appears that the regiment was wearing a supplementary arm title with 'LAN. FUS.' embroidered in red letters on dark blue.

=== Traditions ===
As a battalion of the Lancashire Fusiliers, the unit celebrated Minden Day on 1 August each year. This was continued even after it had transferred to the RE and later RA, and by the detached and independent batteries after the battalion was broken up in the Second World War. In 1942, women members of the Auxiliary Territorial Service attached to the battalion took part in the parade for the first time, and at the Minden Day Dinner that year the Loyal toast was given by the ATS Commander as vice-president of the officers' mess.

=== Memorials ===
A memorial to the Volunteer Service Companies of the Lancashire Fusiliers and other townsmen who served in the Second Boer War stands in Salford City Centre. It is surmounted by a bronze sculpture by Sir George Frampton, known as the 'Cheering Fusilier', depicting a Lancashire Fusilier in full dress waving his fusilier cap. (Another copy is on the war memorial in Bury, Greater Manchester, location of the 5th Lancashire Fusiliers.)

The World War I memorial to the various Salford battalions of the Lancashire Fusiliers is a cenotaph in Acton Square, Salford, erected by the Lancashire Fusiliers (Salford) War Memorial Committee. A World War II dedication was added later.

The Lancashire Fusiliers War Memorial, designed by Sir Edwin Lutyens, stands outside the Fusilier Museum and Regimental HQ at Gallipoli Garden, Moss Street, Bury.

=== Battle Honours ===
The battalion was awarded South Africa 1900–1902 for the service of its volunteers during the 2nd Boer War. During the First World War, the battalion contributed to the honours of the Lancashire Fusiliers. The RE and RA do not carry Battle Honours, so none were awarded to 39th S/L Regiment.

=== Honorary Colonels ===
The following officers served as Honorary Colonel of the battalion:

- L. Knowles, appointed 21 June 1899.
- Col F. Haworth, VD, former Commanding Officer, appointed 10 February 1906.
- Brig-Gen A.H. Spooner, CB, CMG, DSO, appointed 28 August 1929.
