= 92nd Searchlight Regiment, Royal Artillery =

92nd Searchlight Regiment, RA
- Royal Artillery cap badge
- Active: 1 May 1941 – 31 May 1943
- Country: United Kingdom
- Branch: British Army
- Type: Searchlight
- Role: Air Defence
- Size: 3 Batteries
- Part of: Anti-Aircraft Command

The 92nd Searchlight Regiment (92nd S/L Rgt) was an air defence unit of Britain's Royal Artillery during World War II. The regiment was formed in May 1941 as part of the rapid expansion of Anti-Aircraft (AA) defences during The Blitz. It served in AA Command until disbandment in 1943.

== Origin ==
92nd Searchlight Regiment was created during the rapid expansion of AA defences during The Blitz. Regimental Headquarters (RHQ) was formed at Dallam Tower near Milnthorpe, Westmorland, on 1 May 1941 and it was allocated three S/L batteries numbered 556–8. The batteries came from different training regiments, where each had been formed on 13 February around a cadre of experienced officers and men drawn from existing S/L units:

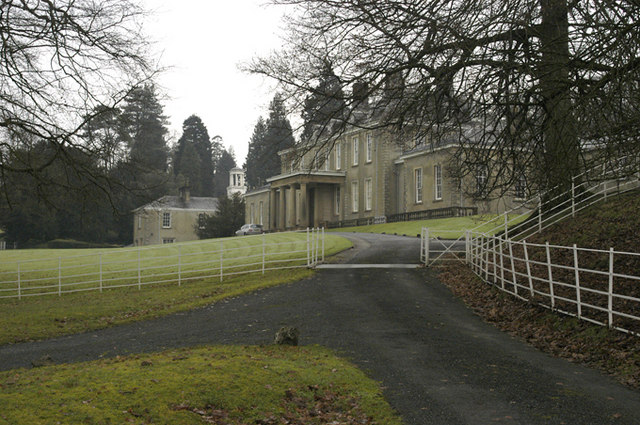
Dallam Tower, original RHQ of 92nd S/L Rgt.

- 556 S/L Bty formed by 233rd S/L Training Rgt at Saighton Camp, cadre from 50th (The Northamptonshire Regiment) S/L Rgt
- 557 S/L Bty formed by 234th S/L Training Rgt at Carlisle, cadre from 55th (Durham Light Infantry) S/L Rgt
- 558 S/L Bty formed by 235th S/L Training Rgt at Ayr, cadre from 47th (Durham Light Infantry) S/L Rgt

It was the last all-male S/L regiment to be formed in AA Command during the war (the remaining batteries and regiments formed were 'Mixed', where the majority of the personnel were women of the Auxiliary Territorial Service). The regiment was assigned to 53rd Light AA Brigade in 4th AA Division. The brigade's role was to provide S/L cover for the North Midlands of England.

== Service ==
Formation sign of 4th AA Division.

The task of the S/L units was to track and illuminate raiders for the Heavy AA (HAA) guns of the Gun Defence Areas (GDAs) and for the few available Royal Air Force (RAF) Night fighters. During the Blitz (which was just ending when the regiment was formed) AA Command had adopted a system of clustering three S/Ls together to improve illumination, but this meant that the clusters had to be spaced 10,400 yards (9,500 m) apart. This layout was an attempt to improve the chances of picking up enemy bombers and keeping them illuminated for engagement by AA guns or night fighters. Eventually, one light in each cluster was to be equipped with Searchlight Control radar (SLC) and act as 'master light', but the radar equipment was still in short supply. In 1941 the searchlight layout over the Midlands was reorganised, so that any hostile raid approaching the GDAs around the towns must cross more than one searchlight belt, and then within the GDAs the concentration of lights was increased.

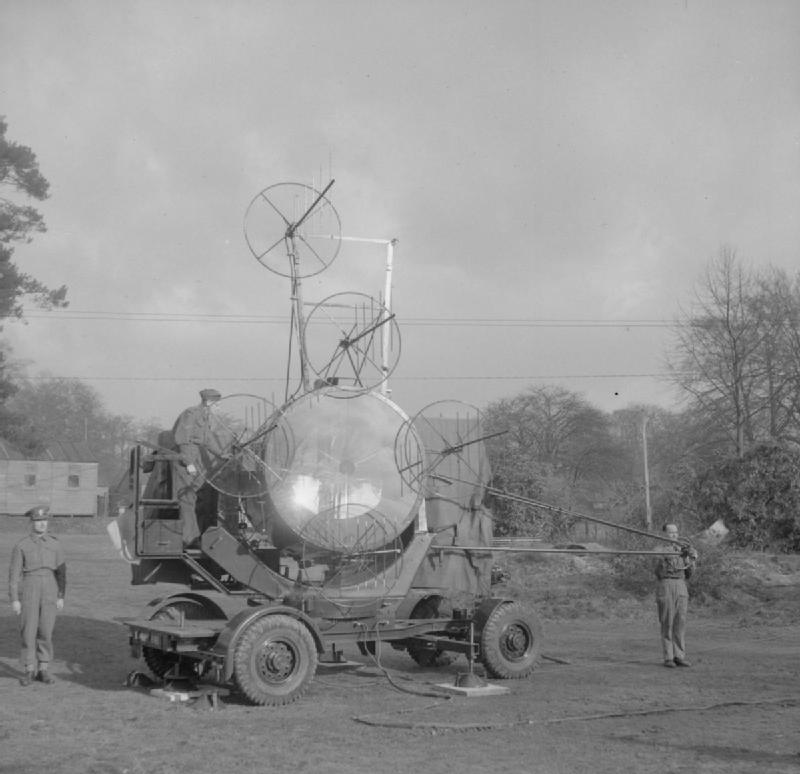
150 cm S/L with AA Radar No 2.

In the summer of 1941, 92nd S/L Rgt transferred to a new 70th AA Bde formed in 4th AA Division. While the HAA and Light AA (LAA) units in the brigade were regularly rotated, 92nd S/L Rgt remained with it until 1943.

A reorganisation of AA Command in October 1942 saw the AA divisions disbanded and replaced by a smaller number of AA Groups more closely aligned with the groups of RAF Fighter Command. Thus 4th AA Division merged with 11th AA Division into 4 AA Group based at Preston and cooperating with No. 9 Group RAF, covering the industrial West Midlands and North West. 70th AA Brigade, including 92nd S/L Rgt, transferred to the new group, but shortly afterwards 557 S/L Bty was attached directly to 5 AA Group covering the East Midlands and Humberside.

== Disbandment ==
By 1943, AA Command was suffering a manpower crisis: it was required to release units and personnel to the field armies and was itself still short of LAA gun units, but it was over-provided with S/L units. The solution was to convert existing S/L units or to disband them and redistribute the personnel. On 24 February 1943, 557 S/L Bty was formally detached from 92 S/L Rgt and became an independent mobile unit in 21st Army Group. It served in the campaign in North West Europe, where it became a 'Moonlight Battery' providing illumination for night operations such as the Rhine crossing (Operation Plunder).

Meanwhile, the rest of 92nd S/L Rgt with its two remaining batteries, which had reverted to the command of 53rd AA Bde, was disbanded on 31 May 1943.
