= 557th Moonlight Battery, Royal Artillery =

557th Independent Moonlight Battery, RA 582nd Independent Moonlight Battery, RA
- Royal Artillery cap badge
- Active: 13 February 1941–10 October 1945
- Country: United Kingdom
- Branch: British Army
- Type: Searchlight Battery
- Role: Air Defence; Movement light
- Part of: II Canadian Corps (557 M/L Bty); XXX Corps (582 M/L Bty)
- Nickname(s): 'Wright's Irregulars' (582 M/L Bty)
- Engagements: Operation Overlord; Operation Astonia; Operation Switchback; Operation Veritable; Operation Plunder

The 557th Independent Moonlight Battery, Royal Artillery was a Searchlight (S/L) unit of the British Army that provided artificial illumination, or 'Monty's Moonlight', for night operations by 21st Army Group during the campaign in North West Europe in 1944–45. Previously, it had served on anti-aircraft (AA) duties in the United Kingdom and Normandy.

== Origin ==
The battery was formed on 13 February 1941 at 234th S/L Training Rgt at Carlisle, with a cadre of experienced officers and men from 55th (Durham Light Infantry) S/L Rgt. On 1 May it was assigned to the new 92nd S/L Regiment, the last all-male S/L regiment to be formed in Anti-Aircraft Command. 92nd S/L Regiment comprised 556, 557, 558 S/L Btys and was assigned to 53rd Light AA Brigade in 4th AA Division. 53rd Light AA Brigade's role was to provide S/L cover for the North Midlands of England.

In the summer of 1941, 92nd S/L Rgt transferred to a new 70th AA Bde in 4th AA Division. Then in October 557th Bty was attached directly to 5 AA Group (which had replaced 4th AA Division), and on 20 February 1943 it was formally detached from 92 S/L Rgt and became an independent mobile unit in 21st Army Group.

== Independent battery ==
On 1 June 1943 the battery was at Toft Hall Camp in Cheshire, where it came under command of the newly formed 76th AA Bde HQ at nearby Peover Hall at Knutsford, which was training for the planned invasion of Normandy (Operation Overlord). Mobile S/L units had their own Royal Electrical and Mechanical Engineers (REME) detachments, and 'N' S/L Battery Workshop was formed on 18 May 1943 at the REME Mobilisation and Holding Centre, Bestwood Camp, Arnold, Nottinghamshire. It was formally designated 557 S/L Battery Workshop on 3 June and mobilised for overseas service on 29 June. It travelled to join the battery at Oulton Park Camp, Tarporley, Cheshire, on 4 August.

557 S/L Battery left Oulton Camp on 3 January 1944, when it moved to Southend-on-Sea. From here its individual Troops went to practise 'Canopy' S/L defences at RAF stations at Bradwell-on-Sea, Coltishall and Twinwood Farm.

76th AA Bde HQ was to be part of the initial assault forces on D-Day, while 557 S/L Bty was among the follow-up units, so in April 1944 it was transferred from 76 AA Bde to 51st AA Defence HQ in 21st Army Group, then to 103rd AA Bde, and finally to 107th AA Bde, which was scheduled to cross to Normandy after D-Day. The battery moved to Nettlebed in Oxfordshire where it was joined by a small signals section of the Royal Corps of Signals in preparation for its mobile role.

== Normandy ==
90 cm Projector Anti-Aircraft, as used for 'artificial moonlight', displayed at Fort Nelson, Portsmouth

Finally, 557 S/L Bty embarked at Gosport on 26 July and landed in Normandy the following day, where it came under the command of 100th AA Bde until 107th AA Bde HQ arrived and took over on 12 August. On arrival, A Troop and a section of B Troop were deployed to defend Caen, where a S/L lorry was burnt out by enemy shellfire on 3 August. The remainder of B Troop deployed south of Caen on 10 August.

On 7 August, 344th Independent S/L Bty provided 'artificial moonlight' (or 'Monty's Moonlight') for a night attack south of Caen (Operation Totalize); officers of 557th S/L Bty attended to gain experience in this new technique.

557th's lights obtained several good illuminations during a Luftwaffe night raid on 15 August, and C Trp was deployed under 80th AA Bde to defend the bridges over the River Orne, and then moved forward to the bridges at St-Pierre-sur-Dives.

== Breakout ==
As 21st Army Group's breakout from the beachhead got under way, A and B Trps were sent forward on 22 August to defend Troarn and Falaise, while a section of A Trp provided lighting for Royal Engineers (RE) working parties. By early September, the battery was with 107th AA Bde assisting the River Somme crossings. It then made a diversion to Le Havre where it provided artificial moonlight for the attack by I Corps on the night of 10/11 September (Operation Astonia) –when it proved particularly valuable for ensuring safe passage through gaps cut in the minefields – and then lighting for the continued fighting in the town and docks. While C Trp went to the newly captured bridge at Nijmegen, the rest of the battery assisted at the Siege of Dunkirk.

In October the battery joined II Canadian Corps in the Battle of the Scheldt (Operation Switchback), providing 'moonlight' for the attack on South Beveland and AA Defence for the Canadian gun lines. Afterwards, it provided lighting for bridge and airfield construction, and AA defence for the bridges at Grave (A Trp), Mook (B Trp) and Nijmegen (C Trp) that had been captured during Operation Market Garden. In mid-November most of the battery relieved 344 and 356 S/L Btys at Nijmegen where the two vital bridge were under regular attack from the air and from frogmen with explosive charges, so that searchlights had to sweep the river as well as the sky.

For the rest of 1944 and into January 1945, the battery remained at Nijmegen, under 74th AA Bde in First Canadian Army, with A Trp detached to Grave.

== Moonlight batteries ==
At the end of January, in preparation for Operation Veritable, the battery began experiments to put a 90 cm searchlight onto a Canadian Ram tank with its turret removed, while the electric generator was placed in an accompanying tank. (The obsolete Rams were also being used as turretless armoured personnel carriers known as Kangaroos.) The aim was to give greater cross-country mobility to the lights. A section of C Troop began operating these vehicles in support of 15th (Scottish) Division during Veritable. However, this project was not proceeded with, because existing Canal Defence Lights on Grant tank chassis were brought of out storage and operated by 49th Armoured Personnel Carrier Regiment of 79th Armoured Division.

When Veritable opened on 9 February, 557 Bty supported the attack by 3rd Canadian Division and 15th (Scottish) Division, providing low-intensity lighting for routes and marshalling areas. Four of the battery's 90 cm light, with their generators, were mounted on steel towers constructed by the Royal Engineers. The following day the battery's lights were called upon to illuminate roads, and particularly to help a Canadian brigade in danger from floods.

After their success in Veritable, the independent S/L batteries providing movement light were reorganised, officially redesignated 'Moonlight Batteries', and assigned directly to corps HQs. Between 5 and 14 March, 557 (Ind) S/L Bty was broken up at Vilvoorde to form 557 and 582 (Independent) Moonlight Batteries, each with about 250 men and 24 S/Ls, and a REME workshop of 33 men. These were assigned to II Canadian Corps and XXX Corps respectively as those formations assembled troops and equipment for the assault crossing of the Rhine (Operation Plunder).

=== 557 Moonlight Battery ===
II Canadian Corps was only peripherally involved in the early stages of Plunder, but the necessary build-up of material involved much night movement, and the deployment of lights included deception sites. The lights were used for several nights before the actual assault to 'accustom the Germans to their use'. Nor did the battery entirely give up its AA role: on the night of 26 March it engaged a formation of three aircraft and claimed one Category B 'kill' with 20mm gun fire. The work was also dangerous: mines were plentiful, searchlight positions were singled out for retaliatory fire, and two of A Trp's forward S/Ls and equipment had to be abandoned for several days under machine gun and mortar fire. The battery borrowed two tanks from 25 Canadian Tank Delivery Squadron to reconnoitre the position, and the equipment was finally recovered. Meanwhile, A Troop deployed detachments as infantry in daytime to protect the flanks of the supply route to the advancing Canadians.

Once II Canadian Corps was across the Rhine at Emmerich, A Trp supported the advance of 4th Canadian Armoured Division, B Trp 3rd Canadian Infantry Division and C Trp 2nd Canadian Infantry Division, all providing movement light and fighting light virtually every night, and also floodlighting for the engineers bridging the river. Occasionally the battery's 20 mm guns were called upon for ground shooting.

When the German surrender at Lüneburg Heath came into effect on 5 May, 557 M/L Bty had reached Borken. Its detached Troops rejoined Battery HQ (BHQ), and all 24 S/Ls were used to illuminate the huge Prisoner of war concentration guarded by 2nd Canadian Division.

Orders to disband were received on 2 August, when the battery was at Aurich, but its vehicles were still being used to transport German refugees in September, and final disbandment was only completed on 31 October.

=== 582 Moonlight Battery ===
The Battery formed on 5 March 1945 at Vilvoorde under the command of Major A.L. Wright, and referred to itself as 'Wright's Irregulars'. For Operation Plunder, A Trp supported 3rd Division and B Trp Guards Armoured Division, which were the follow-up forces, while C Trp was assigned to 51st (Highland) Division, which led the assault. During the operation the battery provided artificial moonlight for XXX Corps' forming up areas, while half a squadron of CDLs of 49th APC Rgt illuminated the assault crossing on 23/24 March and engaged the enemy on the far bank with their 75mm guns. C Trp, also providing fighting light, came under air attack during the night. Artificial moonlight was not universally welcomed by the assaulting troops, some feeling that they were silhouetted while crossing the river.

C Trp crossed the Rhine on the afternoon of 28 March, followed the next day by BHQ. The Troops continued to advance with their respective divisions, lighting routes and bridge construction as well as providing fighting light. Guards Armoured decided to cloak its area in darkness, to hinder the scattered Germans from reorganising, so B Trp thickened up the lighting for 51st (H) Division. Both B and C Trps were bombed, with some casualties. A German wireless station attempted to cause confusion by broadcasting bogus orders to switch off the S/Ls.

The battery provided movement light and fighting light almost nightly throughout April as XXX Corps advanced across Germany. When C Trp came under fire on 15 April a section commander was killed and two S/L projectors and their equipment were put out of action. Sergeant H. Wilson took over, applied first aid to the casualties and saw to their evacuation, then went forward under fire to assess the extent of the damage, extracting the undamaged vehicles.. He was later awarded the Military Medal. Captain A.J. Daymond, a troop commander, was awarded a Military Cross for getting a section back into action after it had suffered casualties from a German self-propelled gun and small-arms fire.

When 3rd Division assaulted across flooded country towards Bremen on 23 April, B Trp provided subdued light beams to indicate the axis of advance. C Troop then deployed a section to assist an anti-tank battery tasked with anti-submarine watch on the approaches to the port. The troop engaged one midget submarine with small arms fire. 582 Battery continued to provide fighting light for infantry attacks up to 3 May; 21st Army Group ceased fire on 5 May following the German surrender.

After VE Day, BHQ was established at Zeven outside Bremen to undertake occupation duties, which mainly consisted of providing security lighting for prison camps by exposing lights horizontally along the fences.

Disbandment was ordered on 7 September and completed on 10 October 1945. The final War Diary entry commented 'Conclusion of the short but merry life of 'Wight's Irregulars'.'

== External sources ==
- Royal Artillery 1939–1945
- Royal Artillery Units Netherlands 1944–1945
