= 344th Moonlight Battery, Royal Artillery =

344th Independent Moonlight Battery, RA 581st Independent Moonlight Battery, RA
- Cap badge of the Royal Artillery
- Active: 15 December 1935–30 August 1945
- Country: United Kingdom
- Branch: Territorial Army
- Type: Searchlight Battery
- Role: Air Defence; Movement light
- Garrison/HQ: Harrow, Middlesex
- Engagements: Battle of Britain; The Blitz; Operation Overlord; Operation Market Garden; Operation Veritable; Operation Plunder; Operation Enterprise

The 344th Moonlight Battery, Royal Artillery was a searchlight unit of the British Army that provided artificial illumination, or 'Monty's Moonlight', for night operations by 21st Army Group during the campaign in North West Europe in 1944–45. Previously, it had served on anti-aircraft (AA) duties during The Blitz.

== Origin ==
See main article 36th (Middlesex) Anti-Aircraft Battalion, Royal Engineers

344th Battery began as a part-time AA searchlight (SL) unit of the Territorial Army (TA). In 1924, the Royal Engineers (RE) formed a number of independent AASL companies of the TA in the Home Counties round London. One of these was 317th (Middlesex) Independent AASL Company based at Harrow. With the expansion of the TA's AA defences in the 1930s, this company was expanded into a full battalion (36th (Middlesex) AA Battalion) on 15 December 1935. While the battalion was based at Edgware, Middlesex, one of the new companies was 344th AA Company, which remained at Harrow. Major Edward Boggis, MBE, was transferred from 26th (London) Air Defence Brigade Signals, Royal Corps of Signals, to be Officer Commanding 344th AA Company.

After the Munich Crisis in 1938, the TA was doubled in size, and 344th AA Company was detached from 36th AA Bn to provide the cadre for a duplicate unit, 58th (Middlesex) AA Battalion, RE. The new battalion had its headquarters at Harrow and was commanded by Brevet Lt-Col Boggis.

== Mobilisation ==
See main article 58th (Middlesex) Searchlight Regiment, Royal Artillery

In view of the worsening international situation, a partial mobilisation of TA units was begun in June 1939 with a process known as 'couverture', whereby each AA unit did a month's tour of duty in rotation to man selected AA and searchlight positions. On 24 August, ahead of the declaration of World War II, Anti-Aircraft Command was fully mobilised at its war stations. 58th AA Battalion formed part of 40th Anti-Aircraft Brigade in 2nd AA Division. Based at RAF Duxford, the brigade was responsible for providing AA defence for RAF airfields in Eastern England. 344th AA Company was stationed at Spalding, Lincolnshire, moving to Alford, Lincolnshire in April 1940.

== The Blitz ==
On 1 August 1940 the RE AA Battalions were transferred to the Royal Artillery (RA) and were redesignated searchlight regiments, the companies becoming batteries. By this time 58th S/L Regiment had been moved to 32nd (Midland) Anti-Aircraft Brigade, still in 2 AA Division, but now responsible for AA defence of the East Midlands during the forthcoming Blitz. 344 S/L Battery was based at Woodhouse Eaves in Leicestershire.

There were heavy air raids on Leicester and Nottingham on the nights of 19/20 and 20/21 November 1940. During the latter raid one of the battery's lights was following an enemy aircraft when the aircraft dive-bombed and machine-gunned the site, causing casualties (one killed, one mortally wounded) and damaging the light before the detachment could respond with its defensive Light machine gun (LMG).

One notable raid on Nottingham and Derby on the night of 8/9 May 1941 became known as the Nottingham Blitz. Later in 1941 the searchlight layout over the Midlands was reorganised, so that any hostile raid approaching the Gun Defended Areas (GDA) around the towns must cross more than one searchlight belt, and then within the GDAs the concentration of lights was increased. In March 1942 the Battery HQ moved from Woodhouse Eaves to the Militia Camp at Melton Mowbray.

== Mobile role ==
On 19 April 1943, 344 S/L Bty received a warning order that it was to train for a mobile role. It became an independent battery on that day, no longer part of 58th S/L Regiment. During May it drew motor transport and attended No 3 Battle Training School at Penybont in Radnorshire, then in June it carried out mobile training under 11 AA Bde at Wivenhoe Camp in Essex. Finally, in July, it moved to Grimsditch Camp, near Salisbury and joined 100 AA Bde, one of the formations preparing for Operation Overlord, the planned Allied invasion of Normandy.

By the end of 1943, Battery HQ was stationed at Oadby in Leicestershire and formed part of 74 AA Bde (another Overlord formation). On 1 January 1944, Major R.H. Taylor assumed command of the battery. In February and March it practised air cooperation at Cleethorpes on the Lincolnshire coast and at Easingwold in East Yorkshire, transferring to the command of 105 AA Bde. The battery was not scheduled to land in Normandy during the early stages of Overlord, so in April its personnel were deployed to Southampton to maintain security around the expeditionary force's marshalling area, while a rear party and the battery's Royal Electrical and Mechanical Engineers (REME) workshop remained at Corsham in Wiltshire to maintain and modify the equipment that it would take overseas.

== North West Europe ==
On 7 June, the day after D-Day, the battery was able to withdraw its security patrols and concentrate once more in order to waterproof its equipment for the voyage to Normandy. The battery moved to its marshalling area on 5 July, embarked on 7 July (less B Troop) and after a few days anchored off Southend-on-Sea, completing its disembarkation at the beachhead on 13 July. It immediately began 'movement light' training exercises with 15th (Scottish) Division (part of XII Corps) on the nights of 13/14 and 14/15 July.

90 cm Projector Anti-Aircraft, displayed at Fort Nelson, Portsmouth

Apart from AA defence, searchlights were used in the North West Europe campaign to reflect light off the cloudbase to provide 'artificial moonlight' or 'movement light' (also known as 'Monty's moonlight') in support of night operations. 344th and 356th Independent S/L Batteries pioneered this technique using their mobile 90 cm searchlights. It was first used to assist the assembly of troops for Operation Greenline on the night of 14/15 July, when the drivers of 15th (Scottish) Division 'found the light a great help to them in finding their way up the pot-holed track through the blinding dust'. The searchlight positions were subjected to light shelling and mortar fire and to low-level air attack, suffering three wounded. However, during the fighting the following night, a jammed column of troops and vehicles was dangerously silhouetted in the movement light, while elsewhere a smoke cloud blotted it out. The battery continued to support British and Canadian formations as the Battle for Caen progressed, providing movement light for II Canadian Corps on 7/8 August. B Troop finally caught up with the battery in 9 August, having landed with the AA reinforcements under 107 AA Bde.

After the break-out from Normandy, 344 Bty provided illumination for the engineers engaged in bridging operations at the River Seine on the night of 29/30 August, a section of A Troop with XXX Corps at Vernon, and B Troop with XII Corps at Louviers. In the subsequent pursuit over Northern France and Belgium, 344 Bty formed part of 106 AA Bde protecting XII Corps as it advanced from the River Somme to Antwerp, with individual Troops widely scattered supporting different formations. This caused practical problems for the BHQ and REME workshop in supplying carbon rods to individual detachments for the arc lamps and in servicing their searchlight control (SLC) radars.

During Operation Market Garden, B Troop advanced with XXX Corps to Eindhoven and provided lighting for bridging operations on the Wilhelmina Canal at Son on the night of 22/23 September, while C Troop provided movement light along the vital traffic routes and A Troop later took up AA defence positions at Grave bridge.

On 1 October, 344 Bty came under the command of 100 AA Bde in XXX Corps, and was deployed to defend the vital bridges at Nijmegen. These bridges were under regular attack from the air and from frogmen with explosive charges, so searchlights had to sweep the river as well as the sky. The battery (less B Troop, which was providing movement light for various formations' night moves and bridging operations) remained at Nijmegen until 11 November, when it handed over its commitments to 356 S/L Bty of 74 AA Bde, and moved up with 100 AA Bde to rejoin XII Corps. It provided movement light for operations by 51st (Highland) Division towards Weert and Roermond (14–21 November), during which it was sometimes subjected to shelling and bombing. At the end of November it moved from Weert to Helden, where it resumed an AA role, and then in December went into Corps reserve at Nederweert for rest and maintenance.

On 22 December the battery relieved 356 Bty in the AA role at Geleen and round Maastricht, where there was increased enemy air activity over the Maas bridges in connection with the German Ardennes Offensive.

== 344th Moonlight Battery ==
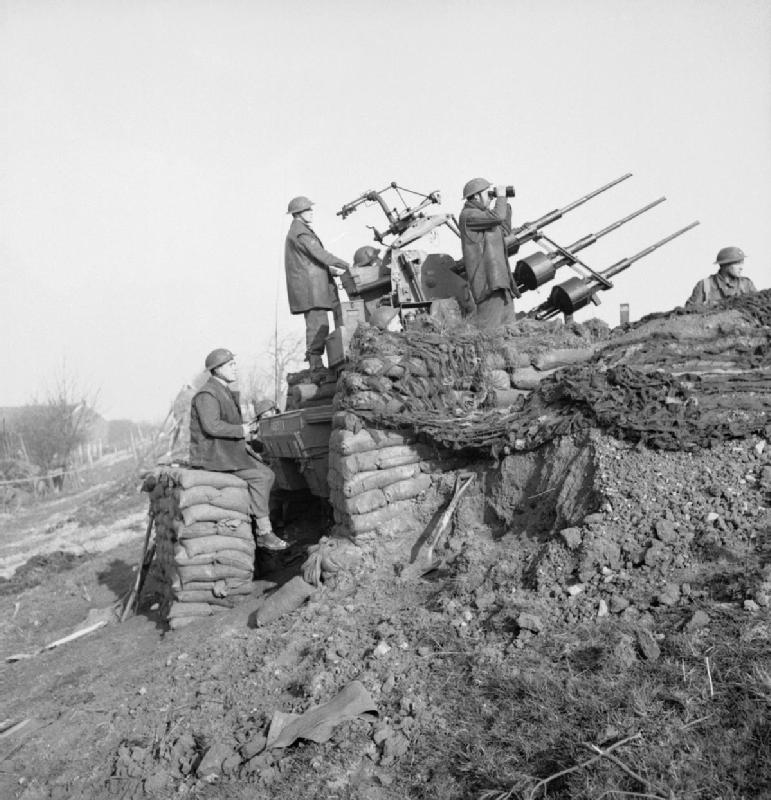
British triple 20mm Polsten gun AA mounting on the bank of the Rhine, 25 March 1945.

The artificial moonlight technique was again used successfully in the Rhineland fighting in February 1945 (Operation Veritable), and a number of searchlight batteries were formally renamed 'Moonlight' batteries, including 344, which split to create 344 and 581 Independent Moonlight Batteries, with some additional manpower coming from 1st, 2nd and 42nd (Robin Hoods, Sherwood Foresters) S/L Rgts. In preparation for the assault crossing of the Rhine (Operation Plunder) the battery underwent intensive training in movement light and in using the 20 mm Polsten gun, which was replacing the LMGs issued to searchlight detachments for AA defence.

As part of the deception plan for Operation Plunder the searchlight detachments exposed some of their lights every night for at least a week before D-Day to accustom the enemy to their use. 344 M/L Battery (including an attached Troop of 581 M/L Bty) was under the command of 100 AA Bde, supporting XII Corps, providing light for marshalling troops before the attack and during the assault itself on the night of 23/24 March. When all three banks of lights were exposed they drew enemy fire and air attacks, which destroyed one of 344 Bty's S/L generators and set fire to nearby ammunition. On XII Corps' front the assault was made by 15th (Scottish) Division, in the appropriately-named Operation Torchlight.

After the successful operation, the battery crossed the Rhine on 27 March, with A, B and C Troops assigned to 7th Armoured Division, 15th (Scottish) Division and 53rd (Welsh) Division respectively. 344 Bty continued to act as the moonlight battery for XII Corps for the rest of the campaign.

== 581st Moonlight Battery ==
This battery formally came into existence on 21 February at Vilvoorde under the command of Maj R.V Spens (previously Battery Captain in 344 Bty). By 1 March its sections were deployed along the Maas, providing light for bridging operations and to assist patrols. During preparations for the Rhine Crossing, C Troop worked with the specialised armour of 79th Armoured Division at Nijmegen on trials of river crossing techniques, while A and B Troops were attached to 52nd (Lowland) and 3rd (British) Divisions respectively to provide movement light. A Troop then joined 344 Bty in the deception lighting before Operation Plunder and supplemented 344 Bty's lights during the battle. Once the river was crossed, 581 Bty helped to transport fuel to the front line, then sent A Troop to support 6th Airborne Division during its overland advance.

In early April the battery was illuminating bridging on the Weser and then helping 15th (Scottish) Division in its advance, including defending divisional HQ against roving groups of German soldiers. On 23 April it began deception lighting at Artlenburg in preparation for the assault crossing of the River Elbe by 15th (Scottish) Division (Operation Enterprise). This took place on 29 April:

'The sky was densely overcast: so much so that the whole programme of air support for the next morning had been cancelled. Yet so bright was the Movement Light of the many searchlights that slanted their diffused beams into the clouds from positions in rear that onlookers could stand unseen in the shadows of Artlenburg with nothing but the waters of the Elbe, molten and gleaming, between them and the enemy'.

After the river had been bridged, A Troop provided lighting to prevent sabotage by frogmen, while the rest of the battery provided movement light for the convoys crossing over and advancing towards Hamburg.

== Postwar ==
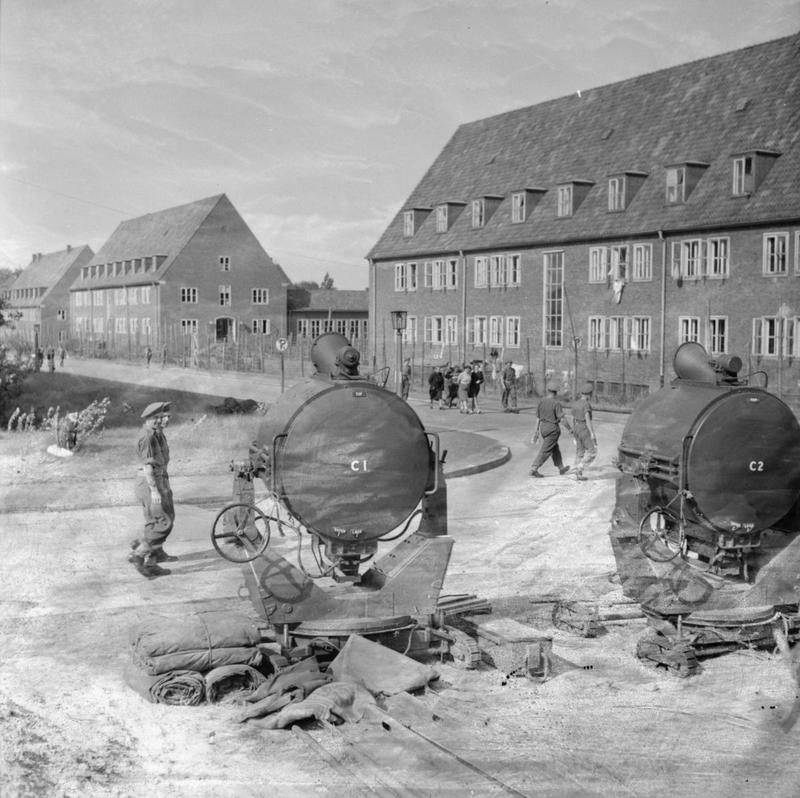
Searchlights set up to illuminate the Isenbruck Barracks near Hamburg, used to house German political prisoners after World War II

In May 1945, after the German surrender at Lüneburg Heath, 344 Bty was used to provide illumination over Hamburg, particularly the Prisoner of War (PoW) cages and the bridging operations on the Elbe. In July it was moved to Spandau, near Berlin, and then back to Brussels, on PoW escort duty. The order to disband the battery was received on 30 August 1945.

581 Bty's lights were used to control shipping on the Kiel Canal until it received its disbandment orders on 15 August, and completed disbandment on 30 August.

In 1947, 58th S/L Regiment reformed in the TA as an AA artillery unit, with members of the Women's Royal Army Corps integrated into its ranks, as 593rd (Mixed) Heavy Anti-Aircraft Regiment, RA (Harrow). It was disbanded in 1955.

== Prominent personalities ==
Among the early officers of the battery were:

- Edward Boggis, born 1898, a clerk at the War Office, volunteered in 1914 and served on the Western Front 1915–18 with the 18th London Regiment (London Irish Rifles). Commissioned into the Royal Corps of Signals (TA) in 1927, and served in 26th (London) Air Defence Brigade Signals, transferred to the RE as OC 344th AA Company 1936 and to the RA as CO 58th Searchlight Regiment 1940. Awarded the MBE 1935, the TD in 1942, and advanced to OBE 1949. He ended his career as a Brevet Colonel in the Royal Army Ordnance Corps (Supplementary Reserve). He committed suicide on 19 November 1955.
- Hon William Speke Philipps, born in 1908, youngest son of Laurence Philipps, 1st Baron Milford. Commissioned Second Lieutenant, RE, in 344 Company on 10 December 1938. Ended World War II as War Substantive Lieutenant (15 July 1941) and Honorary Captain, RA, and was mentioned in despatches. After the war he was chairman of the British National Life Insurance Society and a director of the Court Line shipping company, and died in 1975.
- Hon David Edward Hely-Hutchinson, born in 1911, second son of Richard Hely-Hutchinson, 6th Earl of Donoughmore. Commissioned Second Lieutenant, RE, in 344 Company on 12 January 1939. Ended World War II as War Substantive Major and Temporary Lieutenant-Colonel, RA, (both dated 5 February 1944). After the war he ran a thoroughbred stud in County Tipperary (1946–71) and died in 1984.

== Online sources ==
- British Army units from 1945 on
- British Military History
- Royal Artillery 1939–1945
