= 25th Light Anti-Aircraft Regiment, Royal Artillery =

25th Light Anti-Aircraft Regiment, RA 525th LAA/SL Regiment, RA
- Royal Artillery cap badge
- Active: 23 June 1939 – 10 March 1955
- Country: United Kingdom
- Branch: Territorial Army
- Role: Air Defence
- Size: Regiment
- Part of: Anti-Aircraft Command; 50th (Northumbrian) Division; 53rd (Welsh) Division
- Garrison/HQ: Liverpool
- Engagements: Battle of Gazala; Battle of the Mareth Line; Operation Husky; D-Day; Operation Veritable; Operation Plunder

25th Light Anti-Aircraft Regiment, Royal Artillery was an air defence unit of Britain's Territorial Army (TA) formed in Liverpool just before the outbreak of World War II. It saw active service in the Western Desert Campaign, losing a battery at the Battle of Gazala, and then joined 50th (Northumbrian) Infantry Division for the assault landings in Sicily (Operation Husky) and Normandy (Operation Overlord). It ended the war with 53rd (Welsh) Infantry Division in Germany, and was reformed in the postwar TA, eventually merging with other Liverpool units.

== Origin ==
The regiment had its origin in the 12th Lancashire Battery of the 3rd West Lancashire Brigade, Royal Field Artillery, headquartered at 65 Admiral Street, Toxteth, Liverpool. The '3rd West Lancs' had fought on the Western Front in World War I as part of 55th (West Lancashire) Infantry Division and then as an independent 'Army' field brigade. After the old Territorial Force was reconstituted as the Territorial Army (TA) in 1921, the units were redesignated, the battery becoming 353 (12th West Lancashire) Field Battery in 89th (3rd West Lancashire) Field Brigade of the Royal Artillery (RA).

In the late 1930s the need for improved anti-aircraft (AA) defences for Britain's cities became apparent, and a programme of converting some existing TA units was pushed forward. In October 1937 89th Field Brigade (now based at Tramway Road, Aigburth, Liverpool) became 70th (3rd West Lancashire) Anti-Aircraft Brigade. Three of the batteries were equipped with 3-inch guns, later defined as Heavy AA (HAA), while 353 Field Battery became 225 (12th West Lancashire) Light Anti-Aircraft Battery. At this stage Light AA (LAA) units were armed with Light machine guns (AALMGs), but the new Bofors 40 mm gun was on order.

The TA's AA units were mobilised on 23 September 1938 during the Munich Crisis, with units manning their emergency positions within 24 hours, even though many did not yet have their full complement of men or equipment. The emergency lasted three weeks, and they were stood down on 13 October. The TA was doubled in size after the Munich Crisis, and on 23 June 1939, 225 LAA Bty was expanded to form 25th Light Anti-Aircraft Regiment consisting of 81 and 82 LAA Btys in addition to 225.

== World War II ==
=== Mobilisation and Phoney War ===
In June 1939, as the international situation worsened, a partial mobilisation of the TA was begun in a process known as 'couverture', whereby each AA unit did a month's tour of duty in rotation to man selected AA sites. On 24 August, ahead of the declaration of war, Anti-Aircraft Command was fully mobilised at its war stations, with LAA units distributed to defend Vulnerable Points (VPs) such as factories and airfields. 25th LAA Regiment was part of a new 53rd Light Anti-Aircraft Brigade that was forming in 4th Anti-Aircraft Division, responsible for defending the industrial areas of North West England. During the period of the Phoney War the AA defences of NW England were not tested in action, and the time was spent in equipping and training the TA units.

=== Egypt ===
After the entry of Italy into the war in June 1940 there was an urgent need to reinforce British forces in the Middle East, and a series of convoys began shipping troops (including AA units) on the six-week journey via the Cape of Good Hope and the Red Sea to Egypt. 25th LAA Regiment was one of the first units selected and arrived early in 1941. By then the Italian invasion of Egypt had been defeated, but the commitments of Middle East Forces were widening, including campaigns in East Africa and Greece, and the Siege of Malta. On 4 March 1941 225 LAA Bty was put on 12 hours' notice to move to Malta. On 16 March it left El Tahag Camp and moved by rail to the Alexandria area. On 17 March the first party boarded a transport that sailed to Haifa and then in a convoy to Malta. On 20 March the rest of the battery embarked in Royal Navy warships which met the transports from Haifa. The convoy was divebombed on 21 March without serious damage, and docked in Malta on 23 March. The battery proceeded to St Andrews Barracks where it became part of 74th LAA Rgt, which had been formed on the island the previous month. It served throughout the Siege of Malta and later took part in the campaigns in Sicily and Italy.

Meanwhile, 25th LAA Rgt was brought back to strength on 14 March by the addition of A Bty from 102nd (Northumberland Hussars) LAA/Anti-Tank Rgt, which formed 274 (Northumberland Hussars) LAA Bty. (102 (NH) Regiment continued as a pure anti-tank (A/T) unit thereafter).

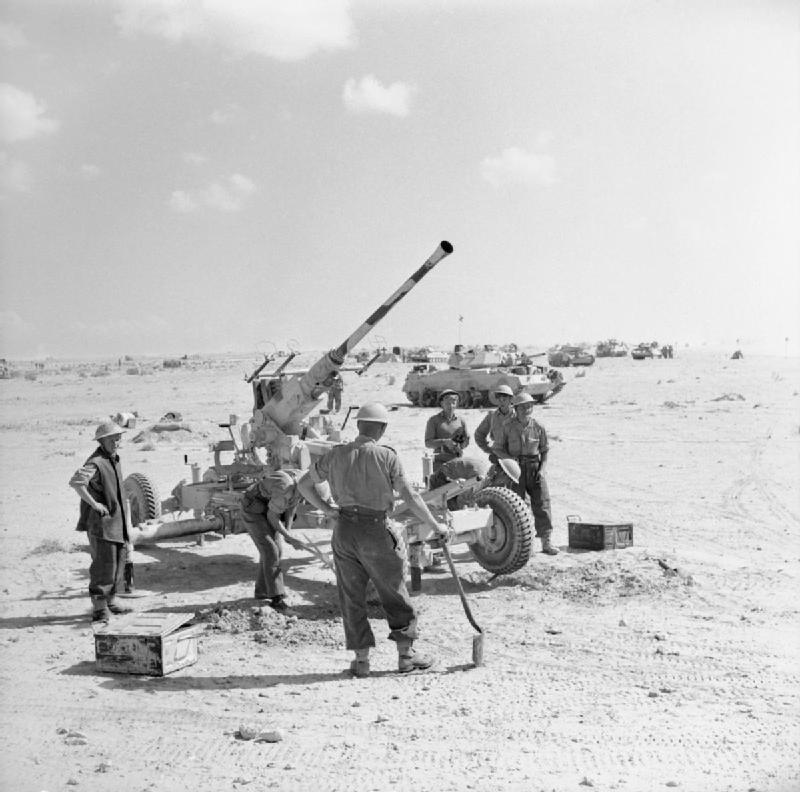
Bofors gun being emplaced in the Western Desert, 1942.

Towards the end of January the Luftwaffe had begun attacking the Suez Canal from Italian bases on Rhodes, dropping magnetic and acoustic mines at night to disrupt shipping in the canal. Most of the vital supplies and reinforcements therefore had to be landed at Suez rather than passing through the canal. Defending against these attacks was an obvious role for searchlights (S/Ls) and LAA guns, but the numbers required for complete coverage were excessive. The compromise plan involved siting single S/Ls on either side of the canal at 2,200 yards (2,000 m) intervals, with additional rows on the flanks spaced at 5-6000-yard intervals. Thus illumination was restricted to a belt along the length of the canal. Fighter aircraft were to provide the main defence, but the need to defend against low-level raids led to the deployment of single Bofors guns spaced at intervals of about 3,500 yards (3,200 m) yards on the banks of the narrow stretches of the canal. 25th LAA Regiment was given responsibility under 2 AA Bde for the 'Canal North' sector with its commanding officer (CO), Lieutenant-Colonel F.L. Orme, appointed as AA Defence Commander (AADC).

Occasional bombing raids by Junkers Ju 88s flying from Greece against Suez began in July and became almost nightly in August and September. The targets were the Port Tewfik dock installations, the oil refinery, railway marshalling yards, Shallufa Airfield and shipping at the anchorage in the bay. During September and October the AA defences were strengthened further and by the end of October 81 LAA Bty with its 12 Bofors was operating in the Suez and Shallufa area under AADC Suez. By this time the Canal defences had absorbed 96 LAA guns and 66 S/Ls.

=== Gazala ===
In October 1941 25th LAA Rgt transferred to 12 AA Bde which had been reorganised as a mobile formation to provide AA cover for Eighth Army and the landing grounds (LGs) of Desert Air Force during the new British offensive into Libya (Operation Crusader). 'Crusader' began on 18 November 1941, and 12 AA Bde's units moved up behind the advance, spread over many LGs and other VPs. Despite a counter-attack by Gen Erwin Rommel that created confusion among the leading LAA units, Eighth Army attacked again, relieving the Siege of Tobruk and capturing the LGs around Sidi Rezegh, where 12 AA Bde established itself.

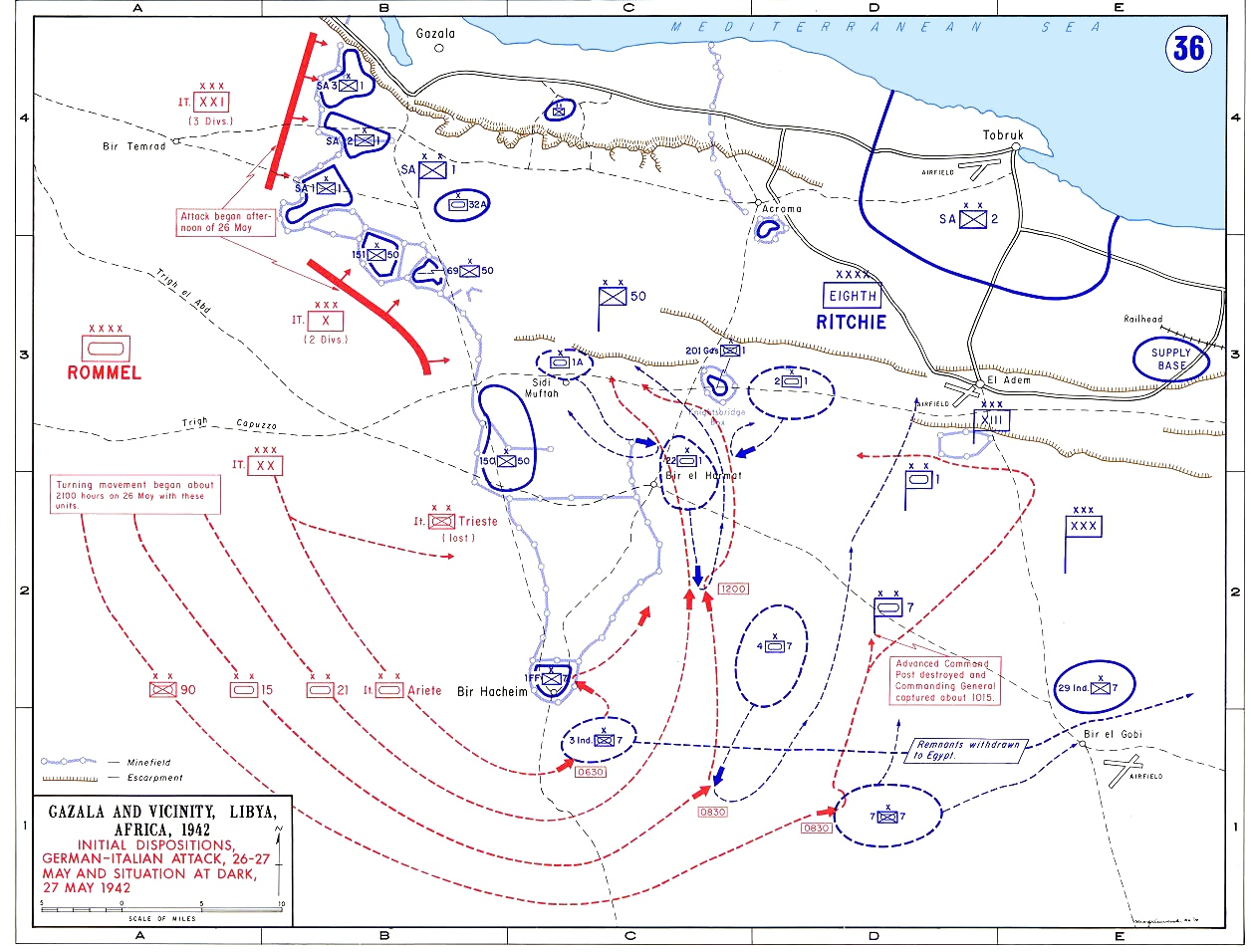
The opening of the Battle of Gazala, 26–27 May 1942.

There was then a pause in the fighting as both sides regrouped. Eighth Army established defensive positions along the Gazala Line. By 22 May 1942, 25 LAA Rgt with 81, 82 and 274 (NH) LAA Btys was listed as 'Army Troops' attached to the recently arrived 50th (Northumbrian) Infantry Division occupying part of this line. The Gazala Line consisted of a series of occupied 'boxes' each of brigade strength set out across the desert with minefields and barbed wire watched by regular patrols between the boxes. 51st (N) Division was operating as three independent brigade groups, each with an attached LAA battery. 81 LAA Battery was with 150th Brigade at Sidi Muftah in the centre of the line, with a gap of 13 miles (21 km) to 1st Free French Brigade's box at Bir Hakeim in the south, and 6 miles (9.7 km) to 51st (N) Division's 69th Bde in the north, then 151st Bde was stationed just north west of 69th. The Gazala Line was not equally manned, a greater number of troops covering the coast route leaving the south less well guarded.

Rommel attacked on 26 May, launching the Battle of Gazala. The German advance was spotted at first light on 27 May. While the northern boxes were pinned by direct attacks, the bulk of the Axis armour swung round Bir Hakeim. The ensuing armoured fighting (the Battle of the Cauldron) therefore occurred to the east, behind 150th Bde's positions. By the evening of 28 May it was clear that 150th Bde was going to be attacked from this direction, and it prepared for all-round defence, reinforced by a few tanks. Early on 30 May elements of the Afrika Korps attempted to break through the position but drew off after taking losses. Next day the Italian Trieste Division and German 90th Light Division attacked, but made little progress against a defence that they described as 'skilful and stubborn'. On 1 June Rommel reinforced the attackers with the 21st Panzer Division and more artillery, and the assault was resumed after heavy dive-bombing. Early in the afternoon 150th Bde was overrun by a series of concentric attacks, the brigadier was killed, and the survivors including most of 81 LAA Bty became prisoners of war.

The battle raged around the remaining boxes for several days until the Axis broke through on 13 June. On the night of 14/15 June the rest of 50th (N) Division broke out of its boxes and escaped towards the Egyptian frontier. 25th LAA Regiment's Royal Army Service Corps transport section had been with 69th (Royal Warwickshire) Heavy AA Rgt in Tobruk. On 16 June, 69th HAA Rgt was ordered back to the Egyptian border with its attached units: the convoy drove through the night to Sollum and therefore escaped the surrender of Tobruk four days later.

81 LAA Battery was not reformed after the battle; it was reduced to a cadre in September 1942 and was later placed in suspended animation. 25th LAA Regiment, with its two remaining batteries, was with XXX Corps in August, then returned to 12 AA Bde's command, while 34th LAA Rgt took over as 50th (N) Division's LAA component for the Battle of Alamein. Indeed, 25th LAA Rgt remained in the rear and was not up with 12 AA Bde when the battle began on 23 October.

50th (Northumbrian) Division's formation sign.

=== Tunisia ===
After Alamein, 50th (N) Division went into reserve and did not follow Eighth Army into Libya until early December. 25th LAA Regiment moved up and formally joined 50th (N) Division on 16 December 1942; 102nd (Northumberland Hussars) had been the division's A/T regiment since October, and both remained with the division for the rest of its active involvement in the war. 83 LAA Battery from 16th LAA Rgt was apparently regimented with 25th LAA Rgt at this time, but the division still consisted of only two brigades, so its LAA regiment only required two batteries. During January–May 1943 83 LAA Bty remained detached to 27th LAA Rgt defending the LGs and bases under 2 and 12 AA Bdes. 83 Bty later joined 27th LAA permanently.

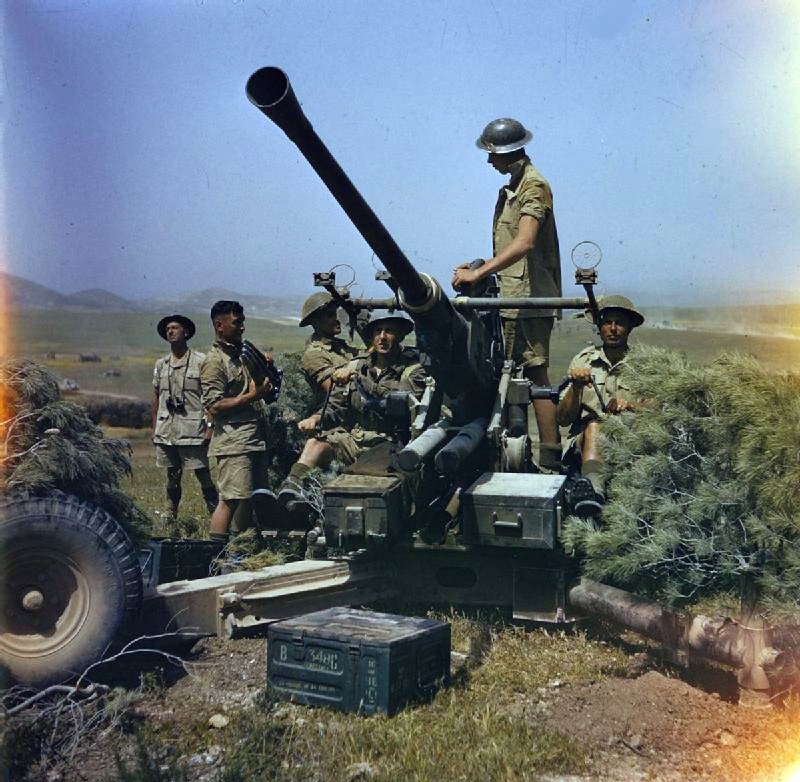
Bofors gun and crew in Tunisia, 1943.

50th (Northumbrian) Division moved up from Tripoli to the front and led Eighth Army's attack on the Mareth line on the night of 19/20 March It took three nights' hard fighting to establish bridgeheads over the Wadi Zigzaou, and in the end the Mareth Line was taken by a wider outflanking move. Then on 6–7 April 50th (N) Division followed 4th Indian Division to breach the anti-tank ditch and wadi at the Battle of Wadi Akarit, another difficult operation but this time successful. The division then followed up and took part in the fighting round Enfidaville before the Tunisian campaign ended with the capture of Tunis on 13 May. Although Axis air attacks against LGs, artillery positions etc had been frequent early in the campaign, these had tailed off as the Allies achieved air superiority. By this stage of the war 25th LAA Rgt was commanded by Lt-Col G.G.O. Lyons, MBE.

=== Sicily ===
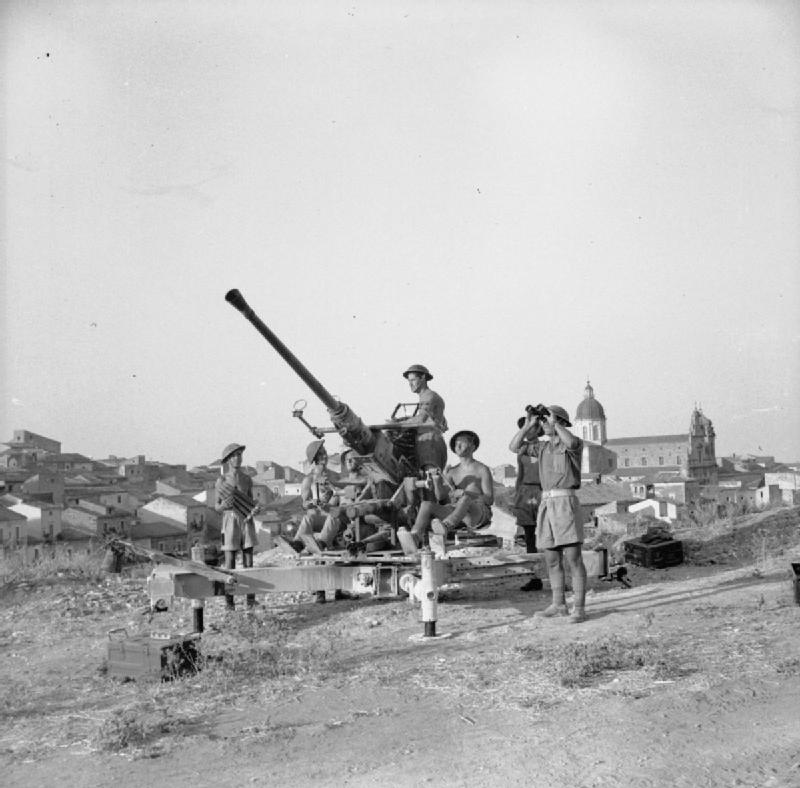
Bofors gun and crew in Sicily, 1943.

50th (Northumbrian) Division was selected as one of the assault formations for the Allied invasion of Sicily (Operation Husky). It returned to Egypt and sailed aboard a Fast Assault convoy from Port Said on 6 July; its first wave began landing before dawn on 10 July. Despite some initial confusion the division secured its beaches, but after sunrise subsequent waves were attacked by Axis aircraft. Anti-aircraft cover for the beaches was the responsibility of 2 AA Bde, which had the tricky task of landing LAA and HAA guns, radars etc, across open beaches with the Beach groups. The divisional LAA regiments were thus freed to land with later waves and advance inland with their parent formations. 2 AA Brigade's guns began landing during the morning and by the end of the day leading elements of 50th (N) Division were moving inland, though few of its guns had yet arrived. The division advanced against rearguards for the next three days along poor inland roads to protect the left flank of XIII Corps on the coastal road.

On the night of 13/14 July 50th (N) Division was ordered to advance up Highway 114 to Lentini to link up first with No. 3 Commando, which had landed from the sea to capture Malati bridge there, and then press on to link up with 1st Parachute Bde, which had carried out a landing (Operation Fustian) to capture Primosole Bridge and clear the way for Eighth Army to advance on Catania Airfield and the city beyond.. Both the commandos and paratroops ran into heavier than expected opposition, and 50th (N) Division was also held up: the paratroops were driven off Primosole Bridge before help could arrive, and the operation turned into a bitter four-day fight to recapture the bridge and cross the big irrigation canal beyond. In the end the attempt was given up and 50th (N) Division went on the defensive while other formations outflanked the enemy positions and captured Catania on 5 August. By now the Luftwaffe was carrying out frequent low-level divebombing and strafing attacks, but these were concentrated against airfields and ports. During August 50th (N) Division slowly advanced up Highway 114 as the Allies drove the Axis troops out of Sicily.

=== Overlord training ===
50th (Northumbrian) Division played no part in the subsequent Italian campaign, having been chosen to return to the UK and prepare for the Allied invasion of Normandy (Operation Overlord). In Sicily the division had operated with a third brigade on loan from 56th (London) Division, but this was earmarked for the Italian campaign. 50th (Northumbrian) Division was therefore brought up to full strength by the permanent addition of 231st Bde, originally part of the Malta garrison, which had fought as an independent brigade group in Sicily and the initial landings in Italy. The divisional LAA regiment consequently required three batteries once more, and on 23 September 1943 25th LAA Rgt was joined by 138 LAA Bty from 27th LAA Rgt (which had previously gained 83 LAA Bty after its loose association with 25th LAA Rgt). The enlarged 50th (N) Division left Sicily on 10 October 1943 and sailed back to the UK as part of XXX Corps to train for Overlord.

The ships carrying 50th (N) Division arrived in the Mersey Estuary in November. Its units were brought up to strength and refitted, and carried out training in the south of England and at combined training centres in Scotland. On 14 March 1944 the absent 81 LAA Bty was formally placed in suspended animation and the regiment's other three (82, 138 and 274 (NH) LAA Btys) were augmented to a strength of four troops each when 75–77 Trps joined from 501 Independent LAA Bty. 501 LAA Battery had been formed on 7 June 1943 from 358 S/L Bty of 40th (Sherwood Foresters) S/L Rgt on its conversion to 149th (Sherwood Foresters) LAA Rgt. It had become independent on 23 February 1944 before joining 25th AA Rgt and being split up. The regiment was still commanded by Lt-Col Lyon.

=== D-Day ===
For the actual assault on 6 June (D-Day), 50th (N) Division was reinforced by 8th Armoured Bde and 56th Independent Infantry Bde. Its target was Gold Beach, between Le Hamel, and La Rivière, on which it was to land two assault brigades. AA cover for Gold Beach and the beach exits on D Day was the responsibility of 76 AA Bde, which was to land three LAA batteries, including 320 LAA Bty of 93rd LAA Rgt equipped with triple 20 mm Polsten guns, half of them self-propelled (SP), mounted on Crusader tank chassis to go inland with the assault troops. Although 76 AA Bde could not land all its guns on D Day, the Luftwaffe only made a few scattered attacks during the first 24 hours. 50th (Northumbrian) Division's own units landing during D Day included 82 LAA Bty, which arrived that night and moved up to defend the division's field artillery area.

As the build-up continued on 7 June (D + 1) the other batteries of 25th LAA Rgt landed. Their convoy had been shelled during the voyage down the English Channel and had suffered casualties and some loss of equipment. They arrived with a mixture of 20 mm and 40 mm equipment to cover the divisional area, while 320 LAA Bty left to protect the site for the Mulberry harbour at Arromanches. Enemy air activity rose sharply on D + 1 and continued for the next two weeks, though the day and night raids were mainly directed against the landing beaches and harbours, and the airborne bridgehead over the River Orne.

=== Normandy and the Low Countries ===
For the next two months the division fought its way slowly through the Bocage country. Since the Allies had achieved air superiority over the beachhead, there was little call for AA defence, and AA units became increasingly used to supplement the divisional artillery to support ground operations. LAA units fired tracer to guide night attacks onto their objectives, and the Bofors guns were much in demand for infantry support. They could give useful close-range fire to help infantry working from cover to cover in the bocage; their rapid fire was good for suppressing enemy heavy weapons, the 40 mm round's sensitive percussion fuze providing an airburst effect among trees. It was also used for 'bunker-busting', though the lack of protection made the gun detachment vulnerable to return fire. LAA units also provided 'refuge strips' for air observation post aircraft spotting for the field guns: a Bofors troop deployed with Local Warning radar and ground observers could alert the pilot to the presence of enemy aircraft and provide protection for him.

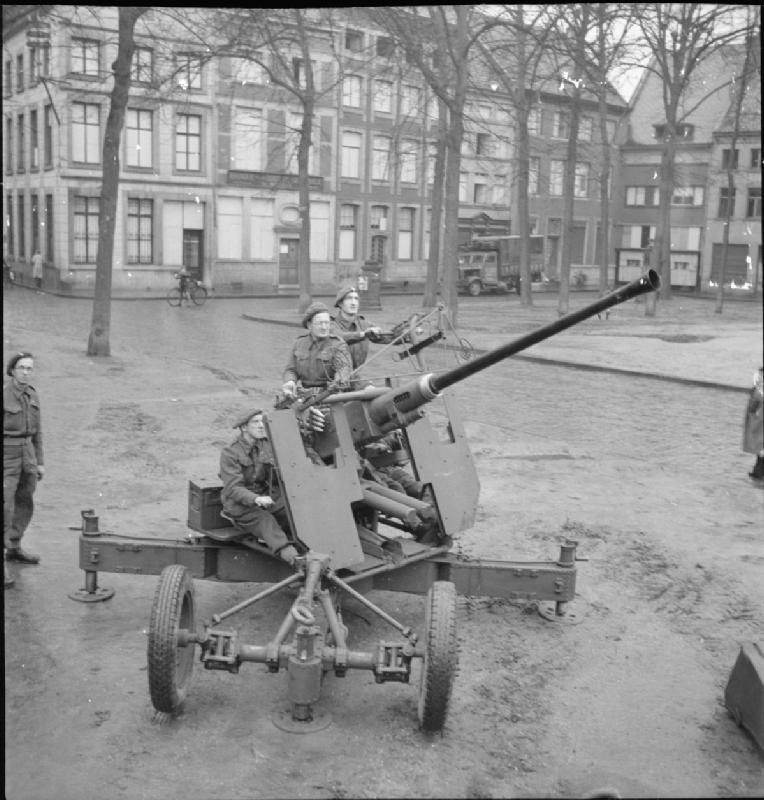
Bofors gun deployed in North West Europe, 1944.

50th (Northumbrian) Division was relieved on 5 August, but was back in action on 9 August, attacking against stiff opposition in the advance beyond Mont Pincon as the Allies closed the Falaise Gap. Once the Seine was crossed and the pursuit began, 50th (N) Division supported 11th Armoured Division's rapid advance, protecting the flank and 'mopping up' local resistance. On 1 September the division secured bridges over the River Somme near Amiens and reached Arras. The AA brigades accompanying 21st Army Group quickly followed up to provided cover for these bridges, while 25th LAA Rgt was able to continue the advance with its division, which took part in the Liberation of Brussels on 3 September.

More resistance was met at the Albert Canal, where 50th (N) Division had to make an assault crossing before pushing on to capture Gheel after bitter fighting (7–11 September). The division was due to play a minor role in Operation Market Garden, holding the bridgehead from which Guards Armoured Division advanced, and later defending the road and bridge at Nijmegen, but the latter turned into a major defensive battle after the defeat at Arnhem, when the bridges came under heavy air attack.

53rd (Welsh) Division's formation sign.

=== Reorganisation ===
The static warfare in the Nijmegen bridgehead was 50th (N) Division's last operation. It was now very weak and in view of 21st Army Group's acute manpower crisis it was broken up at the end of November to provide reinforcements for other formations. The infantry battalions were reduced to cadres which were sent home to train surplus Royal Navy and Royal Air Force personnel as infantry replacements; however, the divisional artillery remained with 21st AG. 25th LAA Regiment was assigned to 53rd (Welsh) Infantry Division on 1 December, replacing that division's 116th LAA Rgt which was disbanded on 31 January 1945.

When the German Ardennes Offensive threatened to break through in December, 53rd (W) Division was among XXX Corps' formations rushed up to seal off the 'Bulge'. It then took part in the counter-attack beginning on 3 January 1945.

=== Germany ===
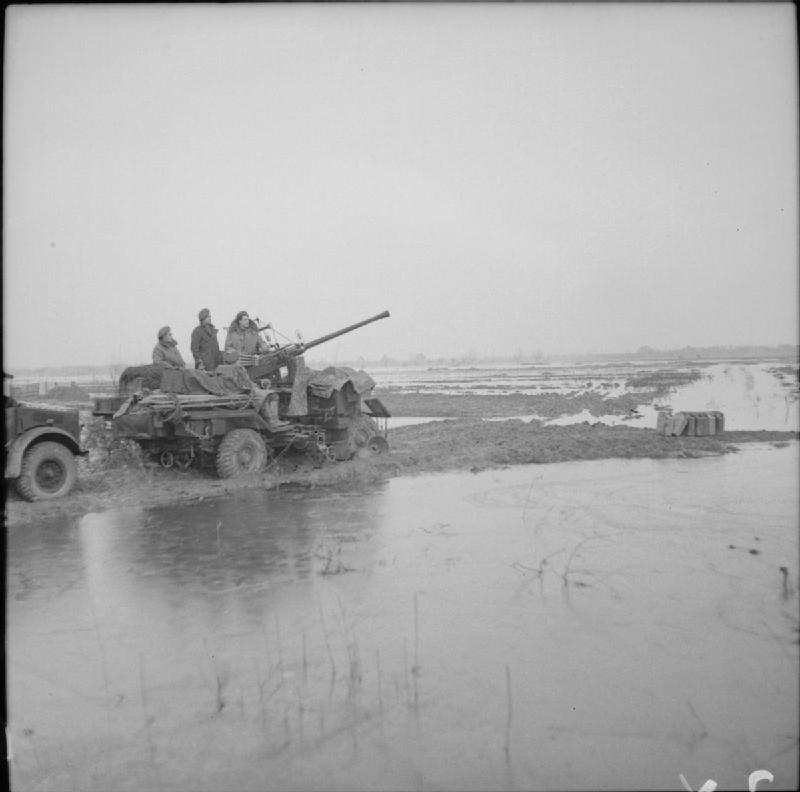
SP Bofors in Holland, December 1944.

53rd (Welsh) Division was next engaged in the fighting in the Reichswald, (Operation Veritable). XXX Corps launched its attack at 05.00 on 8 February, and as the field and medium artillery concentrated on the enemy's batteries, command posts and communication centres, the divisional LAA regiments took part in the 'Pepperpot', in which guns and mortars of all calibres saturated the enemy positions in front of the assaulting infantry. By this stage of the war divisional LAA regiments had received quadruple 0.5-inch Browning machine guns on SP mountings (the M51 Quadmount) in place of a proportion of their Bofors guns, to improve their capability against 'snap' attacks by the new German jet fighter-bombers. Under this arrangement a troop comprised four SP or towed Bofors and two quadruple SP Brownings. The improvement in LAA barrages led to the resumption of high-level bombing by the Luftwaffe.

53rd (Welsh) Division's role in Veritable was to capture the northern half of the Reichswald, and by 02.00 on 9 February it was through the Siegfried Line defences. It was then engaged in a week-long fight through the forests as a thaw set in and turned the roads to mud, though the bad weather prevented much air activity on either side. By 17 February the division was approaching the Goch escarpment. The next phase of the operation began on 22 February, with 53rd (W) Division joining on 24 February with an advance from Goch towards Weeze against heavy opposition. By 3 March the division had taken Weeze and met up with the converging US troops: the west bank of the Rhine was effectively cleared.

The assault crossing of the Rhine, Operation Plunder, involved a large and complex air defence plan. Although 53rd (W) Division was not involved in the initial assault, 25th LAA Rgt was one of the LAA units moved up close to the west bank where it was dug-in and carefully concealed in the 48 hours before D-Day. Their role was both to provide AA cover during the night and to take part in the initial 'Pepperpot'. 15th (Scottish) Infantry Division, leading the assault for XII Corps had over 700 guns of all types on call when the bombardment began at 23.30 on 23 March, followed by 'the start of the Divisional "Pepperpot" at 1 A.M. to swell the din in a mad crescendo and to criss-cross the darkness with the vivid red of anti-aircraft and anti-tank and machine-gun tracer'. The infantry set off across the river in amphibious Buffaloes at 02.00 on 24 March, and made rapid progress inland to link up with the airborne troops who landed during the morning (Operation Varsity). The Luftwaffe did virtually nothing during the assaults or during D-Day itself: only after nightfall did Junkers Ju 88s begin scattered divebombing attacks at medium and low level against the British bridging sites, artillery positions and supply routes. Some of these were engaged by searchlights and LAA guns. The number of attacks increased the following night and were maintained on the fourth night, but after that 21st AG's exploitation was so deep that the Luftwaffe was forced to switch its attacks away from the Rhine to harassing the leading formations. These nuisance raids continued until the German surrender and were dealt with by divisional LAA units.

53rd (Welsh) Division crossed the river on 26 March and continued the advance into Germany. By 10 April it had crossed the Weser and was attacking up the road to Hamburg. It failed to take Rethem, but then found a way over the Aller 5 miles (8.0 km) downstream and advanced towards Verden, which it captured on 17 April. 21st Army Group then closed up to and crossed the Elbe, and 53rd (W) Division had reached the outskirts of Hamburg by the time of the German surrender at Lüneburg Heath.

25th LAA Regiment with 82, 138 and 274 (NH) LAA Btys was placed in suspended animation in British Army of the Rhine on 4 February 1946.

== Postwar ==
When the TA was reconstituted on 1 January 1947 the regiment reformed at Liverpool as 525 LAA Regiment in 79 AA Bde (reformed from the original 53 LAA Bde).

On 16 March 1949, the regiment was redesignated as an LAA/Searchlight regiment, and on 22 July 1950 it absorbed 655 (Liverpool Scottish) LAA/SL Rgt.

When AA Command was disbanded on 10 March 1955 there were wholesale mergers among its units. 525 LAA/SL Regiment, together with 626 (Liverpool Irish) Heavy AA Rgt, was amalgamated into 470 (3rd West Lancs) HAA Rgt, descended from the 70th HAA Rgt that had provided 25th LAA Rgt's original cadre battery in 1939.

== External sources ==
- British Army units from 1945 on
- Orders of Battle at Patriot Files
- Land Forces of Britain, the Empire and Commonwealth – Regiments.org (archive site)
- Graham Watson, The Territorial Army 1947
