= 215th Brigade (United Kingdom) =

215th Infantry Brigade 215th Independent Infantry Brigade (Home)
- Active: 1916–8 April 1918; 20 October 1940-22 December 1941
- Country: United Kingdom
- Branch: British Army
- Type: Infantry Brigade
- Role: Training and Home Defence

215th Brigade was a Home Service formation of the British Army during the First and the Second World Wars.

== First World War ==
The 215th Brigade was part of the 72nd Division, a Home Service division raised in late 1916. It had the dual role of training men for overseas drafts and providing forces for home defence. The brigade was previously known as the 8th Provisional Brigade. The brigade was commanded from 1 November 1916 to 17 January 1918 by Brigadier-General P.W.Hendry. On 21 December 1917 orders were issued to break up 72nd Division. Disbandment began in January 1918 and its last elements dispersed on 8 April 1918.

=== Order of Battle ===
The following infantry battalions served in brigade:

- 28th Provisional Battalion, became 13th Battalion, Lincolnshire Regiment (left July 1917)
- 70th Provisional Battalion, became 15th Battalion, Royal Sussex Regiment
- 81st Provisional Battalion, became 18th Battalion, Royal Warwickshire Regiment (left 24 December 1917)
- 258th Graduated Battalion, (joined 23 July 1917, became 51st (Graduated) Battalion, Durham Light Infantry, 27 October 1917)
- 259th Graduated Battalion, (joined 24 September 1917, became 51st (Graduated) Battalion, Royal Fusiliers, 27 October 1917)

== Second World War ==
=== Formation and Service ===
A new brigade was formed under the title of 215th Independent Infantry Brigade (Home), for service in the United Kingdom, on 10 October 1940 when the No 15 Infantry Training Group was redesignated. It was composed of newly raised infantry battalions. Home brigades had a purely static defence role. The brigade briefly served under 59th (Staffordshire) Infantry Division (10 February–16 March 1941) and then became an integral part of the new Durham and North Riding County Division. The county division ceased to function on 1 December 1941, and the brigade headquarters was disbanded on 22 December 1941.

=== Order of Battle ===
The composition of 215th Brigade:

- 7th Battalion, Loyal Regiment (North Lancashire) formed 4 July 1940 at Preston, Lancashire; left 27 November 1941, converted that month to 92nd Light Anti-Aircraft Regiment, Royal Artillery)
- 8th Battalion, Loyal Regiment (North Lancashire) formed 4 July 1940 at Ashton-under-Lyne, Lancashire; left 27 November 1941, converted that month to 93rd Light Anti-Aircraft Regiment, Royal Artillery)
- 9th Battalion, Loyal Regiment (North Lancashire) formed 4 July 1940 at Lancaster, Lancashire; left 19 November 1941, converted that year to 148th Regiment Royal Armoured Corps)
- 12th Battalion, Royal Welch Fusiliers formed July 1940 at Wrexham; transferred to 217th Independent Infantry Brigade (Home) 8 May 1941, returned 24 October; left 21 December 1941, converted to 116th Light Anti-Aircraft Regiment, Royal Artillery)
- 8th Battalion, Royal Ulster Rifles (9 – 31 May 1941)

=== Commanders ===
The following officers commanded 215th Bde during:

- Brig E.O. Skaife
- Brig C.G.C. Balfour-Davey (from 15 February 1941)
- Brig L. Bootle-Wilbraham (from 22 September 1941)
- Brig J.H. Jewson (from 6 October 1941)

== External sources ==
- The Long, Long Trail
- True Loyals
- The Royal Artillery 1939–45
