= 110th Light Anti-Aircraft Regiment, Royal Artillery =

WWII British Army military unit

7th Battalion, Dorsetshire Regiment 110th Light Anti-Aircraft Regiment, RA
- Cap badge of the Royal Artillery
- Active: 10 May 1940–6 April 1946
- Country: United Kingdom
- Branch: British Army
- Role: Infantry; Air defence
- Size: Battalion; Regiment
- Part of: 43rd (Wessex) Infantry Division
- Engagements: Operation Epsom; Operation Jupiter; Operation Bluecoat; Crossing of the Seine; Operation Market Garden; Operation Clipper; Operation Blackcock; Operation Veritable; Operation Plunder; North Germany

The 110th Light Anti-Aircraft Regiment, Royal Artillery, (110th LAA Rgt) was an air defence unit of the British Army during World War II. Initially raised as an infantry battalion of the Dorsetshire Regiment in 1940, it transferred to the Royal Artillery in 1942. It served with 43rd (Wessex) Infantry Division in Normandy (Operation Overlord) and through the campaign in North West Europe until VE Day.

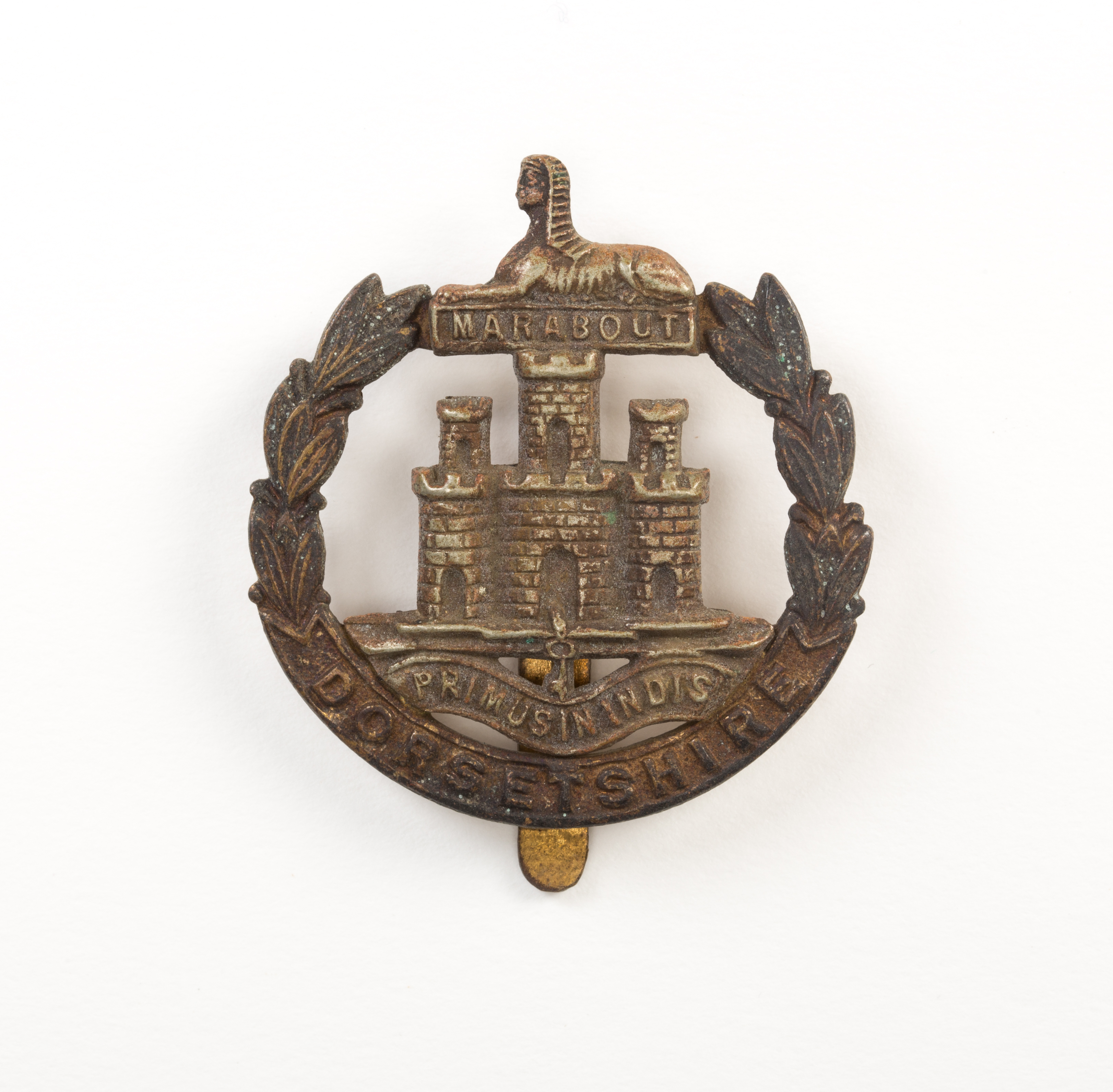
The Dorsets' cap badge.

== 7th (Garrison) Battalion, Dorsetshire Regiment ==
The unit was originally formed on 10 May 1940 at Bletchingley, Surrey, as 7th (Garrison) Battalion, Dorsetshire Regiment. As a designated Garrison battalion, the 7th does not appear to have been assigned to any field force or home defence formation.

At the end of 1941 the battalion was selected to be retrained in the light anti-aircraft (LAA) role equipped with Bofors 40 mm guns: on 1 January 1942 it transferred to the Royal Artillery (RA) as 110th LAA Regiment, comprising Regimental Headquarters (RHQ) and 360, 361 and 362 LAA Batteries.

== 110th Light Anti-Aircraft Regiment ==
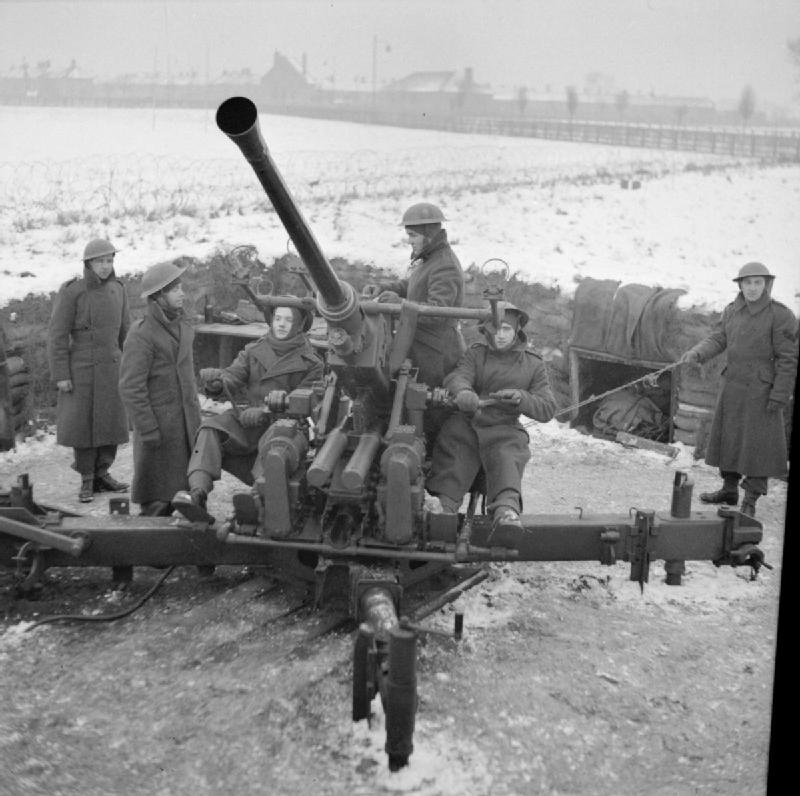
A Bofors 40 mm LAA gun crew under training, January 1942.

The new regiment was originally part of Anti-Aircraft Command, but left in February before it was allocated to a brigade, and instead it joined 43rd (Wessex) Infantry Division on 23 March 1942; it would stay with this formation (alongside two infantry battalions of the Dorsets) for the rest of the war.

=== Overlord training ===
43rd (W) Division was stationed in Kent at this time, and as part of XII Corps was training hard for eventual deployment overseas. By July 1943 it was included in 21st Army Group for the planned Allied invasion of Normandy (Operation Overlord).

43rd (Wessex) Division's formation sign.

On 14 March 1944 the regiment's three batteries were augmented to a strength of four Troops each when 58 LAA Bty of 50th LAA Rgt joined and was broken up to form 30–32 Trps. This brought the establishment of Bofors guns up to 72, but before D Day many divisional LAA regiments exchanged some of their Bofors for multiple-barrelled 20 mm guns (usually Oerlikons or Polstens). Normally half the Bofors troops operated self-propelled (SP) guns. Tactically, 110th LAA Rgt was usually distributed with one SP troop attached to each of the infantry brigade groups:

- One trp 360 LAA Bty with 129 Bde Group
- One trp 361 LAA Bty with 130 Bde Group
- One trp 362 LAA Bty with 214 Bde Group

=== Normandy ===
43rd (W) Division moved into its concentration area in Sussex round Battle, Hastings and Rye by 6 April. D Day for Overlord was 6 June, and on 13 June the division began moving to the embarkation ports. Disembarkation was delayed by bad weather, but the bulk of the division was concentrated north of Bayeux by 24 June with VIII Corps.

The division was committed to its first action in the Battle of the Odon (Operation Epsom) starting on 26 June. The object as to follow 15th (Scottish) Division's advance and then secure the captured objectives in 'Scottish Corridor'. However, this entailed some heavy fighting for the infantry against a Panzer counter-attack on 27 June, an attack cross open cornfields on 28 June and an advance under fire to ford the River Odon and dig in on 29 June. A German counter-attack against them in the evening was destroyed by the divisional artillery. Since the Allies had achieved air superiority over the beachhead, there was little call for AA defence, and AA units became increasingly used to supplement the divisional artillery to support ground operations. LAA units fired tracer to guide night attacks onto their objectives, and the Bofors guns were much in demand for infantry support. They could give useful close-range fire to help infantry working from cover to cover in the bocage; the Bofors' rapid fire was good for suppressing enemy heavy weapons, the 40 mm round's sensitive percussion fuze providing an airburst effect among trees. It was also used for 'bunker-busting', though the lack of protection made the gun detachment vulnerable to return fire. LAA units also provided 'refuge strips' for air observation post aircraft spotting for the field guns: a Bofors troop deployed with Local Warning radar and ground observers could alert the pilot to the presence of enemy aircraft and provide protection for him.

The division's first major offensive action of its own was Operation Jupiter, to take Hill 112, which had been briefly captured by British armour during 'Epsom' but had to be abandoned. The attack on 10 July was supported by all the divisional artillery and mortars, plus the artillery of adjacent divisions. It was supposed to break through and seize bridgeheads over the River Orne, but the massive barrage stunned but failed to suppress the defenders from 10th SS Panzer Division. When the Wessex infantry went forward they came under heavy fire as they fought their way up the slopes. The fighting drew in all the reserves until 5th Battalion Duke of Cornwall's Light Infantry (DCLI) was the last uncommitted battalion. It attacked up the slopes of Hill 112, described as 'one of the most tragic acts of self-sacrifice in the entire North West European Campaign'. Launched at 20.30 towards 'The Orchard' on the crest of the hill, and supported by a squadron of tanks and all available guns, including the Bofors of 110th LAA Rgt, the attack reached the orchard, but could get no further. The DCLI held out through the night but by mid-afternoon on 11 July all the anti-tank guns on the hill had been knocked out, the tanks had to retire to the reverse slope, and the defence was almost over. When the order was given to withdraw some 60 survivors of 5th DCLI were brought down. Both sides remained dug in on the slopes, with the hilltop left in No man's land. The division had to hold its positions under mortar fire for another 10 days, described by the commander of 214th Bde as comparable only 'to the bombardment at Passchendaele'. This defence was followed by a final set-piece attack, Operation Express, which succeeded in capturing Maltot on 22 July.

After a short rest 43rd (W) Division moved to XXX Corps to launch an attack towards the dominating height of Mont Pinçon as part of Operation Bluecoat. Casualties were heavy, particularly from mines, and the advance was slow. After a succession of pre-dawn attacks, the division was still 4 miles (6.4 km) from Mont Pinçon on 5 August. In the end the hill fell to a surprise attack by a few tanks on the evening of 6 August. By daybreak the summit was firmly held by tanks and infantry, despite heavy German bombardment.

43rd (W) Division then participated in XXX Corps' pursuit of the broken enemy, many of whom were caught in the Falaise pocket. The main opposition came from mortars and booby-trapped mines. 110th LAA Regiment's commanding officer, Lt-Col Oscar Dent, TD, was killed on 18 August and was succeeded by Lt-Col F.S. Cowan, who commanded the regiment until the end of the war. (Note: On the outbreak of war Lt-Col Dent had been a battery commander in 67th (South Midland) Field Rgt of the Territorial Army. He was buried near Pont-Erembourg (Saint-Denis-de-Méré). After the war he was reburied in the Bayeux Commonwealth War Graves Commission Cemetery.)

=== Seine crossing ===
The breakout achieved, XXX Corps drove flat out for the River Seine (Operation Loopy), with 43rd (W) Division sent ahead to make an assault crossing at Vernon. The division had to move in three groups at specific times to cross a road that was also being used by US troops. The AA elements of the groups were arranged as follows:

- 360 LAA Bty (25 vehicles) moved with Group One (the assault group, including 129th Bde)
- 71st LAA Rgt from 100th AA Bde, attached to XXX Corps, was with Group Two (214th Bde and the artillery)
- The rest of 110th LAA Rgt (50 vehicles) came up with Group Three (130th Bde and the bridging engineers of 15th (Kent) GHQ Troops Royal Engineers)

Group One arrived at Vernon on the afternoon of 25 August, ready to begin the assault crossing that evening. Parties of infantry struggled across by stormboat and amphibious vehicle, and by using the broken bridges, to establish bridgeheads by morning. This was followed by two days of bitter fighting as the defenders counter-attacked the bridgeheads and shelled the bridging sites. On 28 August the armour began to cross in numbers. The Luftwaffe had been unable to intervene, having suffered a heavy defeat at the end of the Normandy campaign and been forced to reposition to airfields further back. After the Seine crossing, 43rd (W) Division was 'grounded' while the rest of XXX Corps raced across northern France and Belgium. 100th AA Brigade then moved up to defend the Seine crossings, including that at Vernon.

=== Operation Market Garden ===
When 43rd (W) Division next moved, the war was now 250 miles (400 km) away. The first elements moved up to Brussels to protect headquarters, then the division concentrated at Diest to take part in Operation Market Garden, beginning on 17 September. In 'Garden', the ground part of the operation, XXX Corps was to link up river crossings as far as the Nederrijn at Arnhem via a 'carpet' of airborne troops. 43rd (W) Division was to follow Guards Armoured Division, carrying out assault crossings if any of the bridges were found to be destroyed, and guarding the 'corridor' to Arnhem. The advance up the only road ('Club Route') was slow but on 21 September 43rd (W) Division caught up with the Guards at Nijmegen. Further progress was blocked by strong German forces, and 1st Airborne Division holding out at Arnhem was in a desperate plight. 43rd (W) Division fought its way through to the Nederrijn, with the road behind being frequently cut by German tanks. During the night of 23/24 September the division ferried a few reinforcements across to 1st Airborne, but another assault crossing on the night of 24/25 September suffered heavy casualties and few supplies were got across. By now 1st Airborne had been effectively destroyed, and the only course now was to evacuate the survivors. This was carried out on 25/26 September, a dark night with heavy rain. The whole divisional artillery opened up at 21.00, with tracer fired by 110th LAA Rgt marking the flanks of the crossings while the sappers crossed and recrossed the river in stormboats ferrying around 2300 exhausted survivors of 1st Airborne back to the south bank.

In the aftermath of Market Garden, 43rd (W) Division was stationed on 'The Island' (between the Rivers Waal and Nederrijn), fighting off some serious counter-attacks in early October. Further back the vital bridges at Nijmegen came under air attack, but their defence was handled by 100th AA Bde, while divisional LAA regiments protected their own field gun positions.

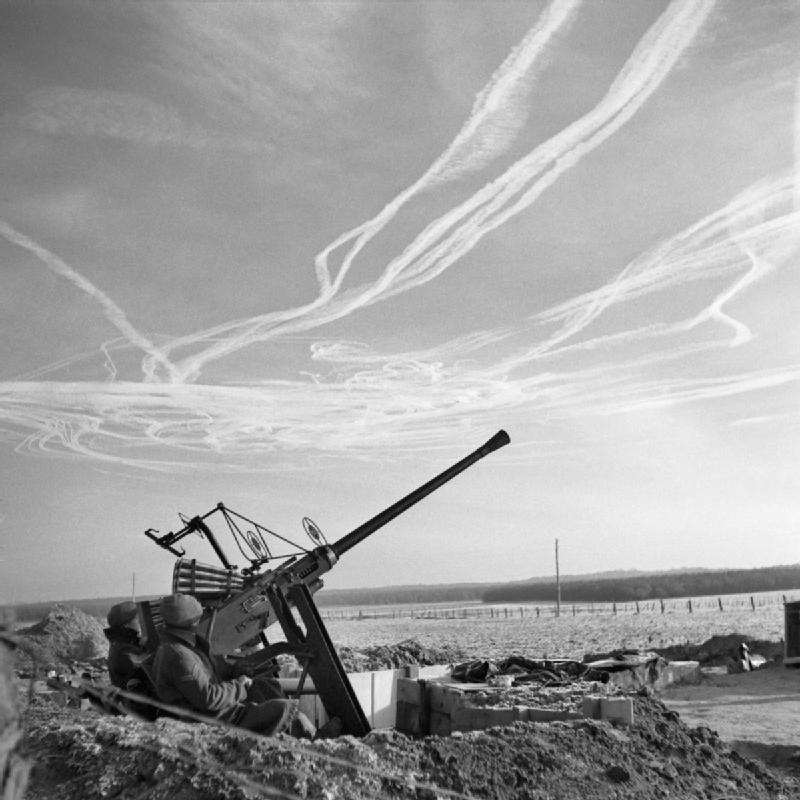
A Bofors crew watches aircraft vapour trails above the German border, 25 December 1944.

=== Operation Clipper ===
43rd (W) Division was relieved on 10 November and then shifted east with XXX Corps to cooperate with the Ninth US Army by capturing the Geilenkirchen salient in Operation Clipper. This entailed breaching the Siegfried Line defences and capturing a string of fortified villages. For two nights before the attack the divisional machine gun (MG) battalion laid down a heavy harassing fire programme of MGs and mortars on the opposing positions, augmented by tank and anti-tank guns, and the AA guns of 110th LAA Rgt – a forerunner of the later 'Pepperpot' (see below). The division's attack was launched on 18 November and after bitter fighting Geilenkirchen was surrounded by nightfall. After driving off some counter-attacks byPanzers during the night, the division captured the town next day. But thereafter heavy rain turned the whole battlefield into mud and guns could not be moved, while the infantry struggled to consolidate their positions under heavy shellfire from the Siegfried Line guns. By 22 November any further advance was impossible due to the waterlogged state of the country, which then had to be defended in conditions resembling the worst of the Western Front in World War I.

Planning was under way to renew the offensive when the Germans attacked in the Ardennes (the Battle of the Bulge) on 16 December. 43rd (W) Division was positioned to counter-attack should the Germans cross the Meuse (Dutch: Maas) but was not needed. When the Luftwaffe launched its Operation Bodenplatte against Allied airfields on 1 January 1945, GHQ AA Troops for 21st Army Group reported that '40 mm LAA had the time of its life'. 110th LAA Regiment shot down six aircraft on that day, including one Messerschmitt Me 262 jet.

=== Rhineland ===
Once the German Ardennes Offensive had been halted, 43rd (W) Division returned to the offensive in early 1945 in Operation Blackcock to reduce the Roer Triangle. The advance was supported by massive artillery concentrations, supplemented by 43rd (W) Division's 'Pepperpots', involving 110th LAA Rgt's Bofors guns, as well as MGs, mortars and tank guns. However, further exploitation was prevented by bad weather. The division then fought through the month-long battle of the Reichswald (Operation Veritable). This was also launched before dawn on 8 February with a massive bombardment: 'The night was lit by flashes of every colour and the tracer of the Bofors guns weaved patterns in the sky. It was light enough to read a book'. The divisional objective was to follow 15th (S) Division's advance and then pass through to capture Kleve. However, the main roads were blocked, the minor roads flooded, and a huge traffic jam of wheeled vehicles resulted. For much of the battle only tracked or amphibious vehicles could be used beyond Kleve and the guns were immobile. On 16 February 43rd (W) Division broke through to the Goch escarpment and on 8 March it entered Xanten on the Rhine.

=== Operation Plunder ===
Although 43rd (W) Division was not scheduled to take part in the assault crossing of the Rhine (Operation Plunder), 110th LAA Rgt played a full part with the other follow-up divisions' LAA units in the 'Pepperpot'.This was a bombardment by massed LAA and A/T guns, machine guns and mortars of all calibres to saturate the enemy positions in front of the assaulting infantry, while the field and medium artillery concentrated on specific targets. The LAA units also fired lines of tracer to guide the amphibious vehicles across the wide river in the dark.

By this stage of the war divisional LAA regiments had started to receive quadruple 0.5-inch Browning machine guns on SP mountings (the M51 Quadmount) in place of a proportion of their Bofors guns, to improve their capability against 'snap' attacks by the new German jet fighter-bombers. Under this arrangement a troop comprised four SP or towed Bofors and two quadruple SP Brownings.

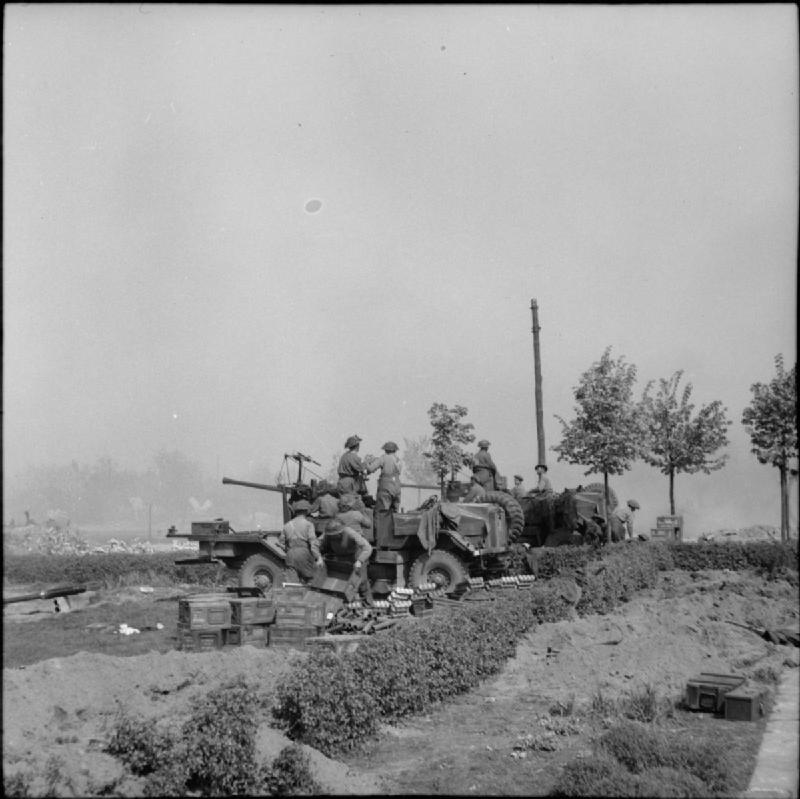
SP Bofors in action against German positions at Bremen 26 April 1945.

The division's leading brigade crossed the river on 25 March behind 51st (Highland) Division, and found itself in immediate combat, but had broken through by 29 March. During the subsequent pursuit, 43rd (W) Division was given the task of opening 'Club Route' for XXX Corps. The division combined with 8th Armoured Brigade to form five battle groups for the first 25 miles (40 km) drive. The advance began on 30 March: after initial traffic jams, the groups either overcame or bypassed German rearguards and Lochem was liberated on 1–2 April. The division was then given the task of taking Hengelo to secure the flank while Guards Armoured Division drove for the Dortmund–Ems Canal; 43rd (W) by-passed the end of the Twente Canal and liberated the town. It then moved back into Germany to capture Cloppenburg on 14 April after a stiff fight and fight off a final counter-attack next day. During these advances the Luftwaffe attacked bridging sites, artillery positions and road movements. For the divisional LAA guns most of these involved 'snap' actions, against low-flying attackers using cloud cover, and often using jet aircraft.

The pursuit continued through April and ended with the division's capture of Bremen against spasmodic opposition and XXX Corps' drive into the Cuxhaven peninsula. The number of Luftwaffe attacks on the advancing divisions peaked in the last week of the war before the German surrender at Lüneburg Heath came on 4 May. That night 110th LAA Rgt lit up the sky with tracer fire, and hostilities ended at 08.00 next day.

The division's units were then employed as occupation forces in XXX Corps' district in Germany. The regiment was serving in British Army of the Rhine (BAOR) when it began to disband on 1 March 1946, completing the process by 6 April.
