= 92nd (Loyals) Light Anti-Aircraft Regiment, Royal Artillery =

WWII British Army military unit

7th Bn Loyal Regiment (North Lancashire) 92nd (Loyals) Light AA Regiment, RA
- Active: July 1940–November 1941 (7th Bn Loyals); November 1941–February 1946 (92nd (Loyals) LAA Rgt)
- Country: United Kingdom
- Branch: British Army
- Role: Air Defence
- Size: Regiment
- Part of: 3rd Infantry Division
- Mottos: Loyaute M'Oblige (Loyals); Quo Fas et Gloria Ducunt (RA)
- Anniversaries: Maida Day (4 July); D-Day (6 June)
- Engagements: D-Day; Defence of Pegasus Bridge; Normandy Campaign; Operation Bodenplatte; Operation Plunder

The 92nd (Loyals) Light Anti-Aircraft Regiment (92nd LAA Rgt) was a mobile air defence unit of the British Army's Royal Artillery (RA) during World War II. The regiment had a special role on D-Day, and afterwards served throughout the campaign in North West Europe.

== Origin ==
92nd LAA Regiment was formed in November 1941 by converting the 7th Battalion, Loyal Regiment (North Lancashire), a war service infantry battalion that had only been raised in the previous year as part of the rapid wartime expansion of the British Army.

=== 7th Loyals ===
A cadre of experienced officers and non-commissioned officers (NCOs) from the Loyals, several recently returned from the Dunkirk evacuation, arrived at Coed Helen Camp at Caernarfon on 5 July 1940, where they were joined by a draft of new conscripts on 17 July to begin forming the new battalion. Most of the recruits came from Liverpool and Birkenhead. Also at Caernarfon were the newly raised 8th and 9th Battalions of the Loyals which (together with 12th Battalion Royal Welch Fusiliers) constituted No 15 Infantry Training Group. In October 1940 the 15th ITG became 215th Independent Infantry Brigade (Home), a home defence formation.

Training was hampered by the shortage of rifles and equipment, and the tented camp became uninhabitable during winter gales. The battalion moved to barracks and billets in the Liverpool area, where the men assisted in firefighting and rescue work during the Liverpool Blitz.

In February 1941, 215th Brigade joined the Durham and North Riding County Division in North East England, where it took up an operational role in beach defence, with 7th Bn at Ravenscar.

=== 92nd (Loyals) LAA ===
In November 1941, the county division and 215 Bde were disbanded. At this point the three battalions of the Loyals were converted from infantry to other roles: the 7th and 8th became the 92nd (Loyals) and 93rd Light Anti-Aircraft Regiments of the RA, while the 9th became 148th Regiment Royal Armoured Corps. The new 92nd LAA Regiment came into existence at Redcar on 15 November, consisting of Regimental HQ (RHQ) and 317, 318 and 319 LAA Batteries, equipped with Bofors 40 mm guns. Surplus men were drafted on 26 November to 211th Heavy Anti-Aircraft Training Regiment at Oswestry where they joined a new 494 (Mixed) Heavy AA Bty that was being formed for 143rd (Mixed) HAA Rgt ('Mixed' indicating that women from the Auxiliary Territorial Service were integrated into the unit's personnel).

At first, the 92nd LAA Rgt assisted Anti-Aircraft Command by deploying to provide LAA cover at Vulnerable Points (VPs) including Stanmore, Luton, Uxbridge and the waterworks at Kempton Park and Hampton, while batteries rotated to gunnery ranges for training. RHQ was established at Frogmore Hall, Watton-at-Stone, Hertfordshire.

== Mobile training ==
On 24 March 1942, 92nd LAA joined 3rd Division, with which it would serve until the end of the war. The regiment underwent mobile training at various locations for the next two years, and when not training were sent on short attachments with AA Command on the South Coast of England, where all available LAA guns were needed to defend against 'hit and run' attacks by Luftwaffe fighter-bombers. 92nd LAA had a few inconclusive engagements with raiders in this period, finally claiming its first 'kill' when 319 Bty shot down a Dornier Do 17 over Newhaven on 10 February 1943.

In early 1943, 3rd Division began training for the invasion of Normandy (Operation Overlord). 92nd LAA went to Scotland for intensive training, being based in Castle Douglas, Kirkcudbrightshire and nearby Dalbeattie, apart from a 'snap' redeployment back to the South Coast for a month in June–July, both for practice in moving and to assist AA Command. By now one troop in each battery was equipped with six self-propelled (SP) Bofors guns, and in March 1944 each battery was given an extra troop equipped with eight 20 mm guns. These additional troops were provided by 214 Bty of 62nd LAA Rgt, which joined on 14 March 1944 and was broken up, with its three Trps (39, 40 and 50) joining 317, 318 and 319 Btys respectively. As a mobile unit the regiment also had its own Royal Electrical and Mechanical Engineers (REME) workshop.

In April 1944 the regiment moved from Castle Douglas to Horndean in Hampshire to make final preparations for Overlord. 3rd Division had been selected as the assault formation to make the first landing on Sword Beach near La Breche d'Hermanville, in Normandy on D-Day. AA defence of the beachhead on D-Day was the responsibility of 80th AA Brigade, and the only divisional LAA unit to land that day would be F Troop of 92nd (Loyals), which was trained for a special role. RHQ and the rest of 318 Bty would land on D +1, while 317 and 319 Btys would arrive in the following weeks. F Troop loaded its six SP Bofors guns onto two Landing Craft, Tank (LCTs) at Gosport, while RHQ, D and E Troops loaded onto larger Landing Ships, Tank at Tilbury on the Thames Estuary.

== D-Day ==
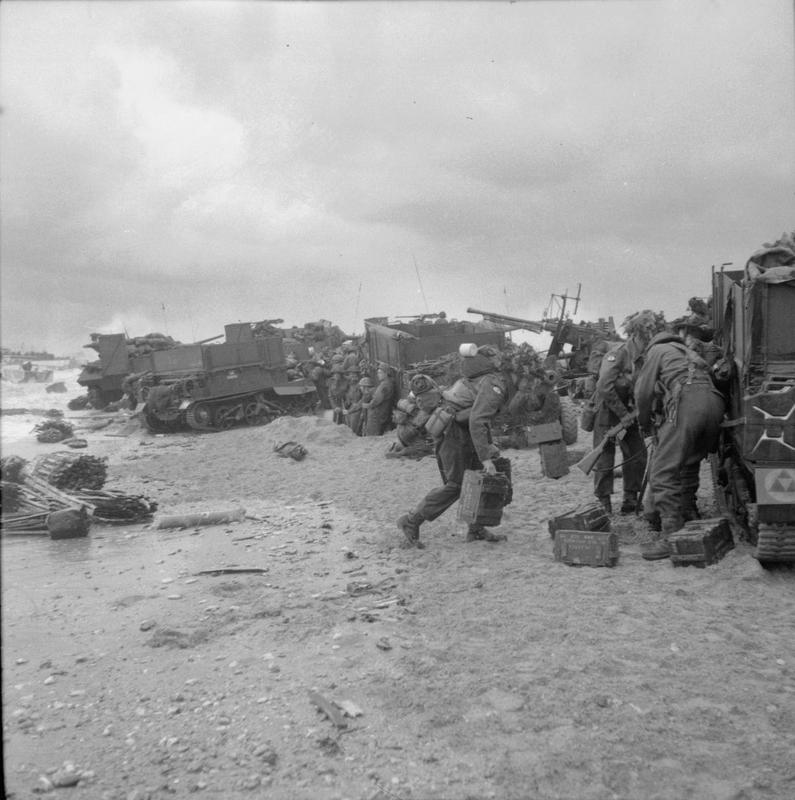
Troops of 3rd Division sheltering on Sword Beach on D-Day, with Bofors gun in background.

F Troop's task on D-Day (6 June) was to drive from Sword Beach to the bridges over the River Orne and Caen Canal at Benouville that had been seized overnight by the glider-borne infantry of the 2nd Battalion Oxfordshire and Buckinghamshire Light Infantry (6th Airborne Division), led by Major John Howard. The reconnaissance party of F Troop (Captain Reid and Sergeant Connor) went ashore with the division's first wave (8th Brigade) soon after H-Hour, while the guns landed with the third wave (9th Brigade) in the afternoon. Reid and Connor accompanied the Commandos of Lord Lovat's 1st Special Service Brigade to the bridges, which were held by 2nd Bn Oxfordshire and Buckinghamshire Light Infantry.

Three SP guns successfully landed on Queen Red beach, but the other LCT was damaged in the final approach and had to land on Queen White. The Troop rendezvoused at Colleville and then moved towards 6th Airlanding Brigade's landing zone, where it spent the night.

Meanwhile, the Thames convoy was shelled by coast guns as it passed down the English Channel, and the Liberty ship Sambut carrying RHQ and the remainder of 318 Bty was damaged and had to be abandoned, with a number of casualties, eight fatal. However further elements of 92nd LAA got ashore on D + 1 (7 June).

== Benouville ==
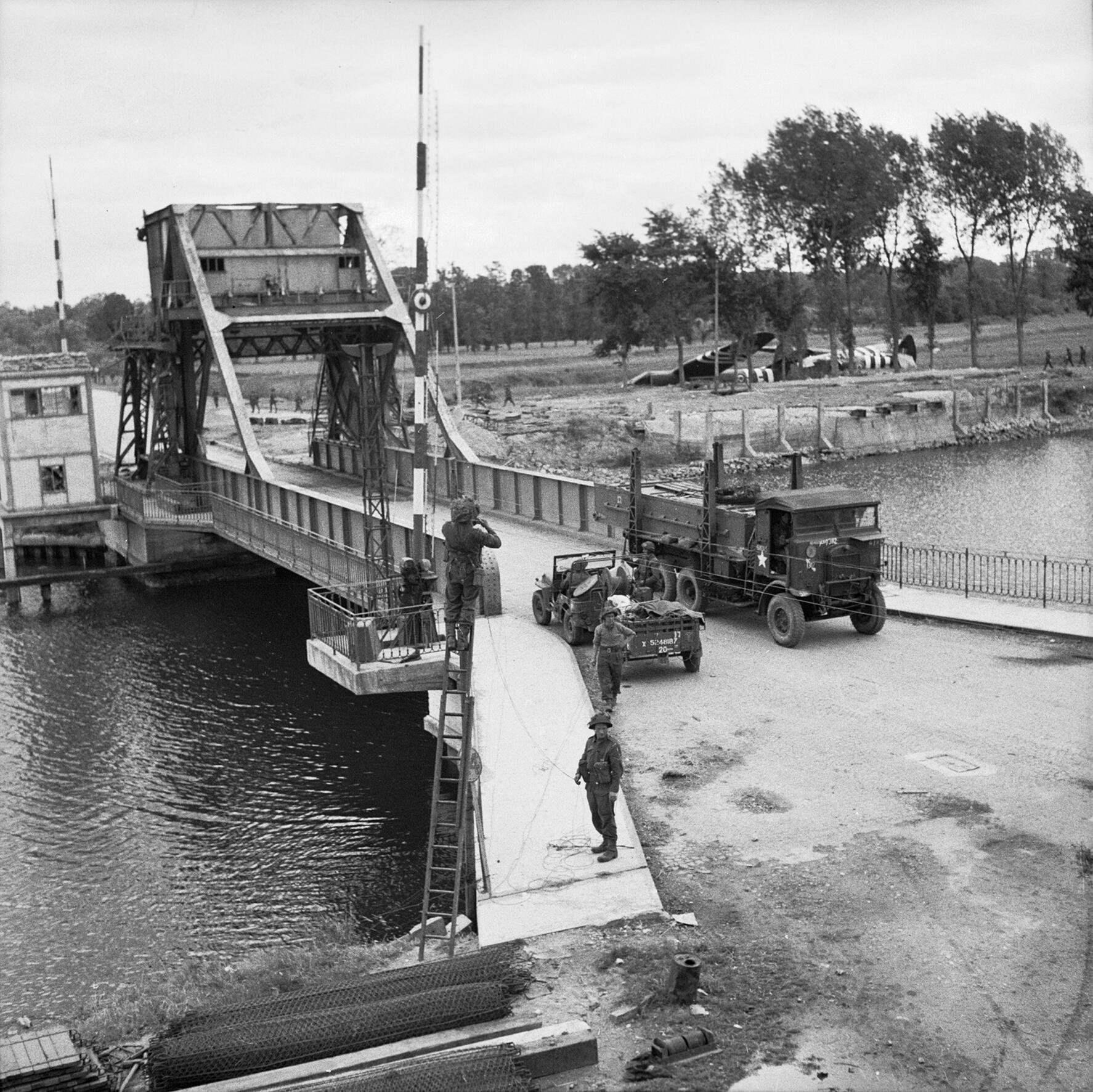
Pegasus Bridge, 9 June 1944.

F Troop deployed around the vital bridges at dawn on D + 1, two guns round the canal bridge (later renamed Pegasus Bridge), two round the river bridge (later renamed Horsa Bridge), and two in between. It was immediately in action against low-level and dive-bombing attacks, during which it shot down two Messerschmitt Bf 109s.

On D + 2 the hottest spot in the beachhead for AA action was Benouville, where F Troop bore the brunt while as many as 45 enemy aircraft milled about in cannon and machine-gun attacks: the Troop shot down three Focke-Wulf Fw 190s. They were joined the following day by D and E Troops of 92nd and four triple 20 mm Polsten mountings from 93rd LAA (the other Loyals LAA unit). That day (D + 3) was the peak, with waves of 50 aircraft attacking; nine more were shot down. Attacks continued until D + 4 (10 June) when another two aircraft were shot down. The six guns of F Troop had fired 5000 rounds of Bofors ammunition in four days.

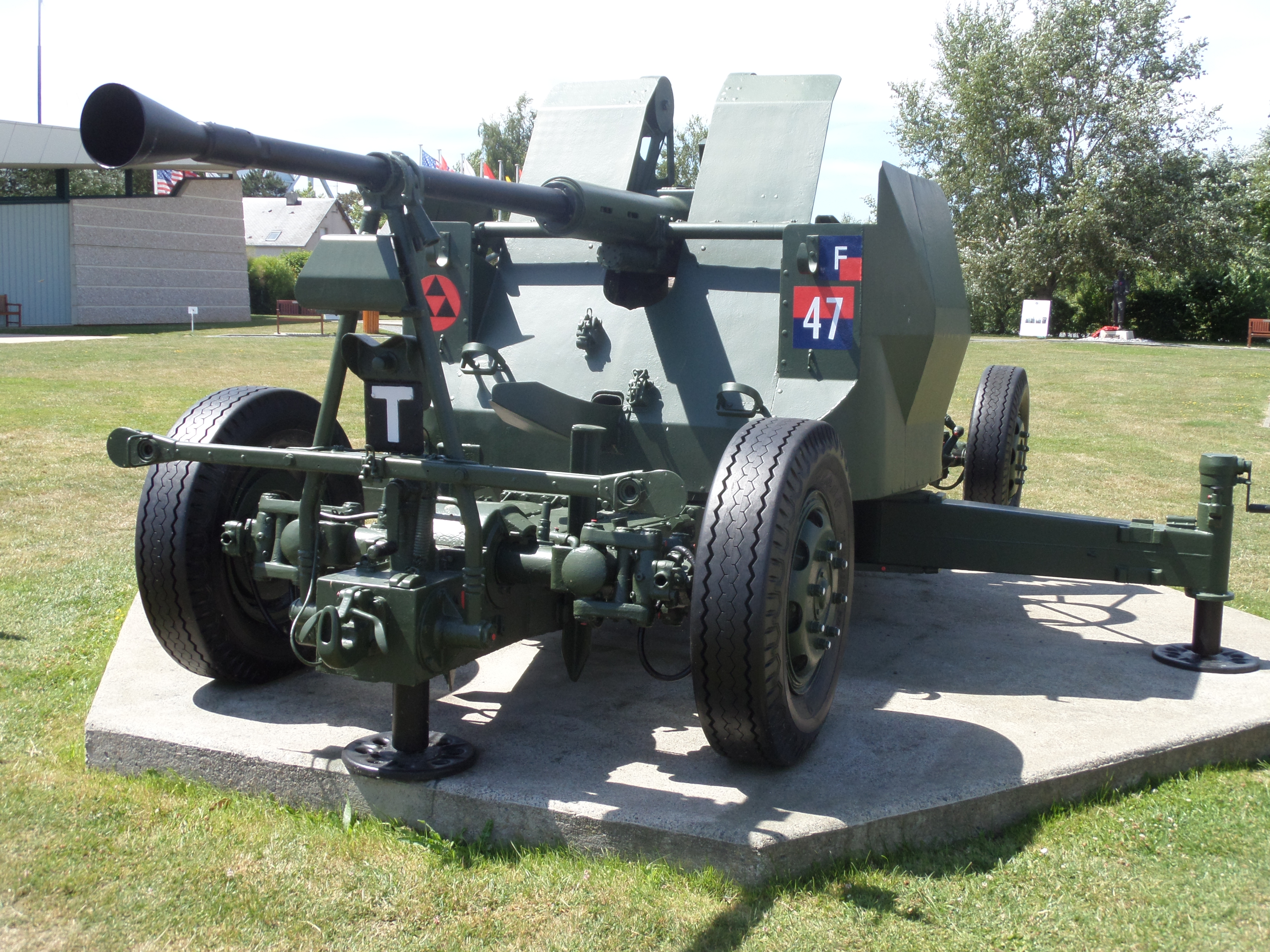
Bofors gun in 92 LAA Rgt's markings displayed at Pegasus Bridge Museum

In addition to air attack, the positions round Benouville were regularly shelled and mortared. On one occasion the oil in the breech of gun F3 caught fire during a mortar bombardment, and Sergeant Clements risked his life by leaving his slit trench to unload the shells from the Bofors. He was later awarded a Mention in Despatches. On another occasion, the Troop prepared to repel enemy tanks and infantry with armour-piercing 40 mm shot and Bren guns.

Benouville continued to be a hot spot, with fierce AA battles throughout June. The 20mm and 40 mm guns of 92nd LAA, together with 40th LAA Rgt from 51st (Highland) Division and 4th Canadian LAA Rgt from 3rd Canadian Division, were in constant action, shooting down 17 aircraft and driving off many others, preventing them from pressing home their attacks.

== Normandy campaign ==
After nine days at Benouville, F Trp was relieved and went to Plumetot airfield to rest and refit with Bofors guns equipped with rangefinders suitable for ground action. Their role at the airstrip was to protect the Auster aircraft operating as air observation posts for the guns of HMS Rodney.

Battery HQ and A Troop of 317 Bty embarked on 13 June and landed at Jig Sector of Gold Beach on 16 June, linking up with B and C Troops already landed. RHQ and the remainder of 318 Bty from the Sambut were re-equipped at Blenheim Barracks, Aldershot, and landed in Normandy on 2 July. The whole regiment had now arrived and was deployed with 318 Bty around Hermanville-sur-Mer to protect gun and vehicle concentrations, while 317 and 319 Btys were on Perrier Ridge. On 4 July the regiment celebrated Maida Day, remembering one of the Loyals' main battle honours.

On 8 and 9 July, A, B and C Trps advanced with 3rd Division in an attack on Caen (Operation Charnwood), but the advance stalled. RHQ at Colleville was shelled and suffered several casualties. 92nd LAA Rgt also participated in Operation Goodwood, setting up observation posts to spot enemy mortar positions and call down divisional artillery or Royal Air Force fighter-bombers to counter them.

The regiment was deployed east of the Orne for three weeks after Goodwood, and suffered a number of casualties from night bombers, but participated in unseen barrage fire directed by the AA Operations Rooms against night attacks. 3rd Division moved back west of the Orne on 31 July to participate in Operation Bluecoat.

The Allied air forces now had complete superiority over the Normandy beachhead and the need for AA defence was reduced. 92nd LAA Regiment was reduced by three Bofors Troops (C, E and H) and the three additional 20 mm Troops (X, Y and Z), leaving each battery with two Troops, one each of towed and SP Bofors. From now on the Bofors regiments were often used for direct and indirect ground shoots. 92nd LAA Rgt also retained responsibility for 3rd Division's counter-mortar teams.

== Low Countries ==
At the end of August, 21st Army Group broke out of the Normandy beachhead, and 3rd Division was given a period for rest and training. It them moved up into Belgium and forced the Meuse-Escaut Canal on 19 September, with 92nd LAA following up to protect the canal bridge at Lille St Hubert. It then crossed the Dutch border and moved on to protect the bridges over the s'Hertogenbosch Canal. There were a number of engagements with Luftwaffe fighter-bombers, including one while on the move, when a strafing Bf 109 was destroyed. In early October the regiment suffered the heaviest period of air attack since Normandy. It also contributed to the artillery bombardment for 3rd Division's capture of Overloon (Operation Aintree), firing 1800 rounds. At the end of the month, 21st Army Group's line was extended, and B, D and F Trps had to go into the line temporarily as infantry to hold a sector on the Meuse (Dutch: Maas).

On 1 January 1945, in support of their Ardennes offensive (a.k.a. Battle of the Bulge), the Luftwaffe launched large numbers of fighter-bombers against the airfields of RAF Second Tactical Air Force (Operation Bodenplatte). After their bombing runs they returned making low-level attacks. Many passed over 92nd LAA's positions, and the regiment's Bofors fired continuously for around 45 minutes. In all it fired 1765 rounds, destroying seven aircraft outright and two more shared, with another five 'probables' – the largest contribution by an LAA regiment on that day.

On 24 February, 3rd Division moved out of rest areas and crossed the Mass to reinforce Operation Veritable, the clearance of the Klever Reichswald. 92nd LAA Rgt crossed the Geran frontier on 27 February and deployed around Goch taking part in ground shoots. During 185 Brigade's attack on Kervenheim, 318 battery fired 2400 rounds in 20 minutes in indirect shooting against enemy trenches.

== Crossing the Rhine ==
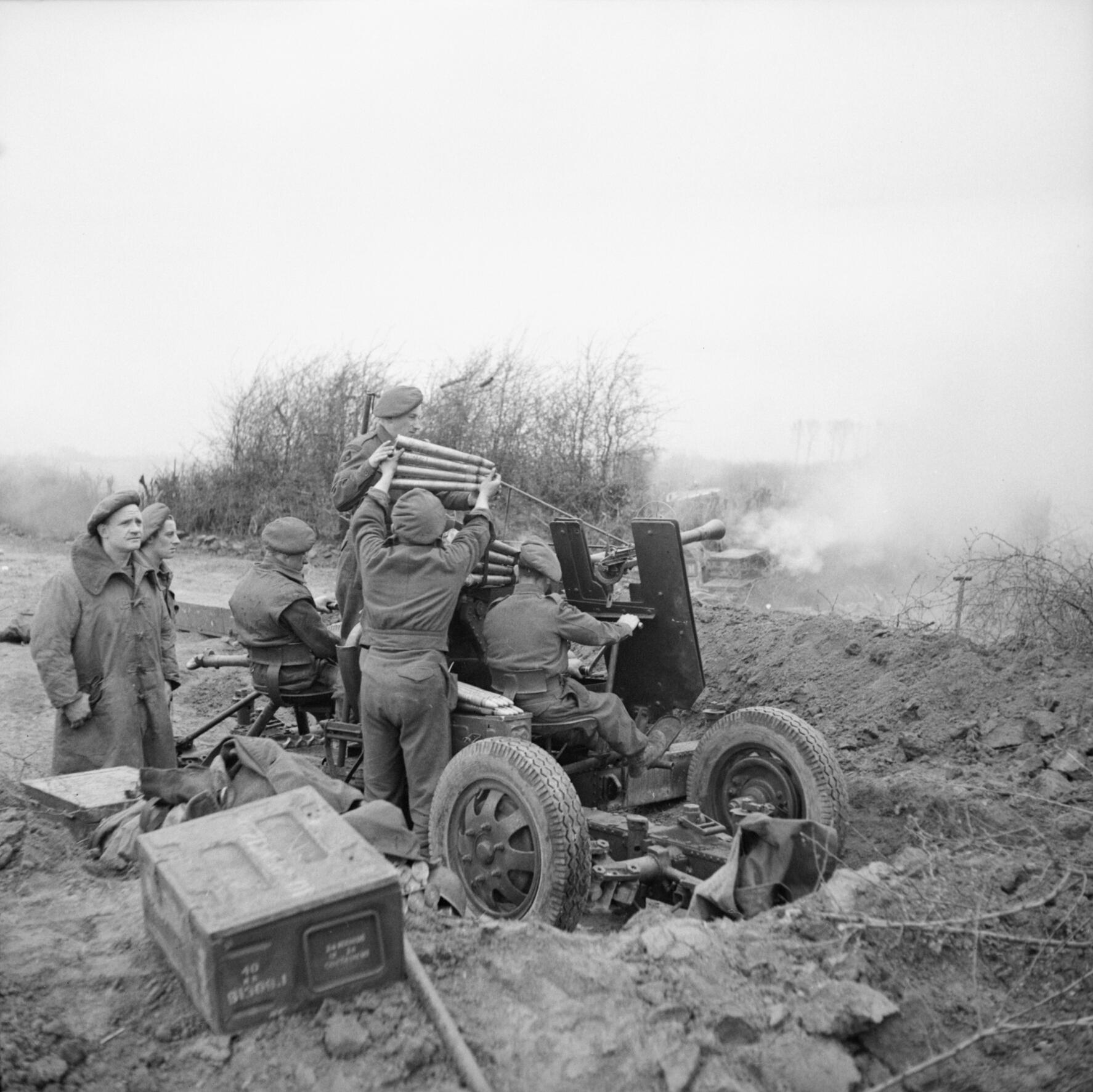
Bofors gun of 319 Bty, 92nd (Loyals) LAA Rgt in ground support role east of the Rhine, 26 Mar 1945.

During the opening stage of the Rhine crossing (Operation Plunder) 3rd Division was a follow-up formation, holding the west bank of the river while 51st Highland made the assault crossing on the night of 23/24 March 1945. However, 92nd LAA Rgt participated in the 'Pepperpot' attacks, in which every gun or mortar in range fired intensively to saturate enemy ground positions before the infantry went in. Each battery of 92nd fired between 4500 and 6500 rounds, the regiment as whole firing 32,000 rounds over the fours days. D Troop also fired 46 rounds from a captured 88 mm Flak gun.

92nd LAA Regiment crossed the Rhine on 28 March. 3rd Division now pushed on rapidly towards its objective of Bremen. To improve mobility, 92nd left its towed Bofors behind, advancing only with RHQ and three SP troops (attached to the three RA field regiments), while 12 three-ton lorries were lent to 185 Brigade as a troop-carrying platoon. On 4 April, 3rd Division crossed the Dortmund–Ems Canal in assault boats and 92nd was deployed to defend the canal and river bridges against 'ferocious' attacks by fighter-bombers.

The rapid advance continued: on 15 April the regiment fired 1000 rounds in support of 8 Brigade's attack on Brinkum. On 25 April, 3rd Division crossed the Weser into Bremen, covered by a massive bombardment, to which 92nd contributed 36,000 rounds – 37 lorry-loads – aimed at the Kattenrtun area and the city's airfield. 319 Battery's guns each required seven new barrels to be fitted during this bombardment, and the regiments Flak 88 was also employed. One Bofors was sited to cover the Weser in case German submarines tried to intervene in the assault. On 3 May the regiment fired for the last time in the war, destroying two boats on the Weser and a German signal station. The following day the German surrender at Lüneburg Heath was signed and 21st Army Group ceased fire on 5 May.

From D-Day to VE-Day, 92nd LAA Rgt had travelled 600 miles, firing 95, 627 rounds of 40 mm ammunition at air and ground targets, of which 18,878 rounds of 40 mm and 8687 rounds of 20 mm had accounted for 48 enemy aircraft, plus 21 'probables'. It had lost 2 officers and 18 other ranks killed, and 4 officers and 42 other ranks wounded.

== Postwar ==
After VE-Day the regiment remained with the army of occupation, supervising Displaced persons and freed Prisoners of War. Towards the end of May, 3rd Division moved to Kassel and 92nd LAA took over responsibility for the area round Warburg, later at Harpstedt. The regiment handed in its Bofors guns on 17 July and thereafter acted purely as occupation troops. The REME workshop was disbanded on 9 October.

The regiment dwindled through 1945 and early 1946 as men were discharged or posted, and it was formally disbanded on 4 February 1946.

== External sources ==
- Lancashire Infantry Museum
- Land Forces of Britain, the Empire and Commonwealth (Regiments.org) - archive site
- Royal Artillery 1939–1945
- ww2talk
