= 50th Light Anti-Aircraft Regiment, Royal Artillery =

50th Light Anti-Aircraft Regiment, RA
- Cap badge of the Royal Artillery
- Active: 10 July 1940–31 March 1944
- Country: United Kingdom
- Branch: British Army
- Role: Air defence
- Size: Regiment
- Part of: Anti-Aircraft Command; 21st Army Group
- Engagements: The Blitz

The 50th Light Anti-Aircraft Regiment, Royal Artillery, (50th LAA Rgt) was an air defence unit of the British Army during World War II. After serving with Anti-Aircraft Command in the defence of the UK, it trained to take part in the Allied invasion of Normandy (Operation Overlord). However, shortly before D Day, it was broken up to reinforce other units that fought in the ensuring campaign.

== Origin ==
The regiment was formed as part of the rapid expansion of AA Command during the Battle of Britain in the summer of 1940. Regimental Headquarters (RHQ) was formed on 10 July with 58 LAA Battery transferred from 14th (West Lothian, Royal Scots) LAA Rgt, a pre-war Territorial Army unit. It was joined by 93 LAA Bty, originally formed on the mobilisation of AA Command in August 1939, and the newly formed 178 LAA Bty. The three batteries absorbed 520 to 529 LAA Troops, which had been formed on 1 July.

== The Blitz ==
7th AA Division's formation sign

By the autumn, when the Battle of Britain was turning into the night Blitz on Britain's cities, the regiment was assigned to 43rd AA Brigade defending Teesside as part of 7th AA Division. At this stage of the war most LAA units were still armed with Light machine guns (AALMGs), but the new Bofors 40 mm gun was arriving in increasing numbers. These units were deployed to defend vulnerable points (VPs) such as bridges, factories or airfields against low-flying or dive-bombing daylight raids, but could do little against high-flying night raiders during the Blitz. Teesside, including Middlesbrough and Hartlepool, was attacked on the night of 24/25 August and there were some raids on North East England in early September, but Teesside largely escaped the worst of the Blitz.

== Mid-War ==
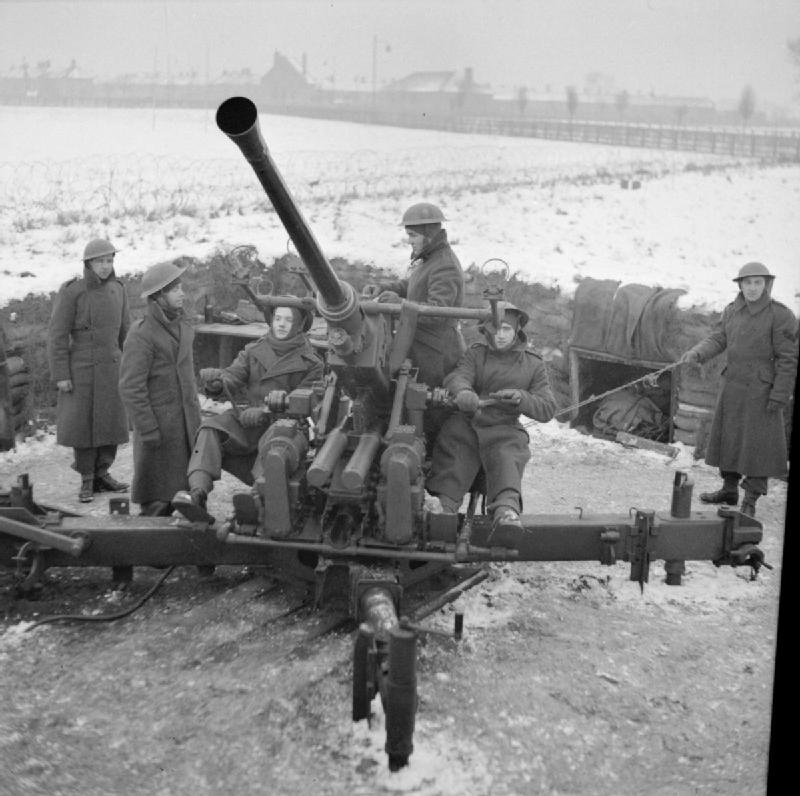
A Bofors gun and crew, January 1942.

The regiment was still with 43rd AA Bde in May 1941, when the Blitz is considered to have ended. That month, 58 LAA Bty was temporarily attached to 57th LAA Bde within 7th AA Division. 178 LAA Battery left the regiment in July (on 4 November 1941 it joined 88th LAA Rgt serving in 4th AA Division in North West England) and was replaced on 22 July when a new 245 LAA Bty was regimented with 50th LAA Rgt. This battery had been formed on 24 April 1941 at 213th LAA Training Rgt at Carlisle, based on a cadre of experienced officers and men supplied by 60th LAA Rgt. In the autumn of 1941, 50th LAA Rgt transferred to 30th (Northumbrian) AA Bde in 7th AA Division. On 19 February 1942, the fourth Troops of each of the regiment's batteries (58, 93 and 245) were detached and combined to form a new 453 LAA Bty within the regiment. This formed part of a new 136th LAA Rgt. (Note: Transferring part of each battery to form a new battery that then left the regiment was a method sometimes used to remove the less physically fit personnel from a regiment selected for training for overseas deployment. For example, 73rd LAA Rgt (which landed on D Day), formed 466 LAA Bty from men of low medical categories at the same time.)

At the end of February 1942, the regiment transferred to 56th LAA Bde covering airfields in Kent under 6th AA Division. Then during April the regiment left AA Command entirely; when it returned in the autumn it was unbrigaded. By early November it had joined 45th AA Bde in South Wales as part of a new 3 AA Group. 58 LAA Battery was temporarily attached to 67th AA Bde during November. Before the end of the year the whole regiment had moved into 63rd AA Bde

At this time every available LAA gun was being deployed to the South Coast towns of England to defend against 'hit and run' attacks by Luftwaffe Fighter-bombers. By March 1943 the regiment was split up across 3 AA Group, with RHQ and 58 LAA Bty under 63 AA Bde, 93 LAA Bty attached to 60th AA Bde around Exeter, Yeovil and Portland, and 245 LAA Bty attached to 55th LAA Bde around Plymouth and Falmouth. In April the whole came under 55th LAA Bde.

During May 1943 the regiment became unbrigaded once more, and by 24 July it had left AA Command and joined 21st Army Group under training for the Allied invasion of Normandy, Operation Overlord. The regiment with its three batteries was designated as a semi-mobile unit, intended to defend VPs behind the front line as the campaign developed.

== Disbandment ==
In early 1944 it was decided to increase the war establishment of the LAA regiments of the armoured and infantry divisions assigned to Overlord, particularly to man the multiple-barrelled 20 mm guns (usually Oerlikons or Polstens) that were being added to some regiments. 50th LAA Regiment was broken up to provide some of the additional personnel. In the first phase, on 23 February, the regiment's Troops were individually numbered:

- A, B and C Trps of 58 LAA Bty became 30, 31 and 32 Trps
- D, E and F Trps of 93 LAA Bty became 33, 34 and 35 Trps
- G, H and I Trps of 245 LAA Bty became 36, 37 and 38 Trps

In the second phase, on 14 March, these Troops were transferred to other regiments:

- 30, 31 and 32 Trps went to 360, 361 and 362 LAA Btys of 110th LAA Rgt in 43rd (Wessex) Infantry Division
- 33, 34 and 35 Trps went to 380, 381 and 382 LAA Btys of 116th LAA Rgt in 53rd (Welsh) Infantry Division
- 36, 37 and 38 Trps went to 203, 204 and 278 LAA Btys of 68th LAA Rgt in 59th (Staffordshire) Infantry Division
  All three divisions landed in Normandy and fought in the campaign in North West Europe.

Finally, RHQ and the battery HQs of 58, 93 and 245 LAA Btys were disbanded on 31 March 1944.
