= 116th Light Anti-Aircraft Regiment, Royal Artillery =

12th Bn Royal Welch Fusiliers 116th Light Anti-Aircraft Regiment, RA
- Royal Artillery cap badge
- Active: 1 January 1942–31 January 1945
- Country: United Kingdom
- Branch: British Army
- Role: Infantry; Anti-aircraft artillery
- Size: Regiment
- Part of: 53rd (Welsh) Division
- Engagements: Operation Overlord; Operation Market Garden; Operation Pheasant

The 116th Light Anti-Aircraft Regiment (116th LAA Rgt) was a Welsh mobile air defence unit of the British Army's Royal Artillery (RA) during World War II. It served with the 53rd (Welsh) Infantry Division in the campaign in North West Europe.

== Origin ==
116th LAA Regiment was formed in January 1942 by converting the 12th Battalion, Royal Welch Fusiliers, a war service infantry unit that had been raised in 1940 as part of the rapid wartime expansion of the British Army.

=== 12th Royal Welch Fusiliers ===
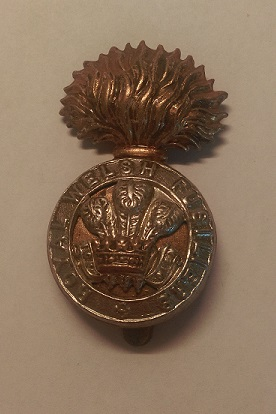
Cap badge of the Royal Welch Fusiliers

12th Battalion, Royal Welch Fusiliers, was formed in July 1940 at the regimental depot at Wrexham. (A previous 12th (Reserve) Battalion, Royal Welch Fusiliers, had been raised for 'Kitchener's Army' during World War I.) The battalion assembled in camp at Caernarfon, joining the newly raised 7th, 8th and 9th Battalions of the Loyal Regiment (North Lancashire) and together they constituted No 15 Infantry Training Group. In October 1940 the 15th ITG became 215th Independent Infantry Brigade (Home), a home defence formation. Training was hampered by the shortage of rifles and equipment, and the tented camp became uninhabitable during winter gales, with the battalions having to go into billets.

In February 1941 the brigade transferred to the Durham and North Riding County Division in North East England, where it took up an operational role in beach defence. 12th Royal Welch Fusiliers left 215th Bde on 8 May 1941, transferring to 217th Bde (also in Durham & North Riding County Division) but returned on 23 October 1941.

All the brigade's infantry battalions left in November and December for conversion to other roles in the Royal Artillery (RA) or Royal Armoured Corps. 12th Royal Welch Fusiliers was the last to leave, on 21 December 1941, and the brigade was disbanded next day.

Formation sign of 53rd (Welsh) Division in World War II.

=== 116th LAA Regiment ===
12th Royal Welch Fusiliers was converted into a light anti-aircraft (LAA) regiment of the RA, which officially came into existence on 1 January 1942. It consisted of Regimental Headquarters (RHQ) and 380, 381 and 382 Batteries, equipped with Bofors 40 mm guns. After training it joined 53rd (Welsh) Infantry Division on 3 April 1942 as that formation's air defence unit.

== Training for Overlord ==
53rd (Welsh) Division came under the command of XII Corps, and both were later assigned to 21st Army Group training for the Allied invasion of Normandy (Operation Overlord).

In preparation for overseas service, the regiment's three batteries were augmented to a strength of four Troops each when 93 Bty of 50th LAA Rgt joined on 14 March 1944 and was broken up, with its three Trps (33, 34 and 35) joining 380, 381 and 382 Btys respectively.

== Normandy ==
53rd (W) Division was not in the first wave landing on D Day; it sailed to Normandy and landed between 21 and 27 June 1944. On the night of 29/30 June the division began moving into 'Scottish Corridor' to relieve the 15th (Scottish) Division, which had battered its way into the enemy lines during the Battle of the Odon (Operation Epsom); the relief was completed on 1/2 July. The division played a minor part in the next offensive phase, Operation Jupiter, guarding the western flank of the attack.\

Preparatory attacks for Operation Goodwood began on 15 July. 53rd (Welsh) Division captured Cahier, but only held onto it with difficulty against heavy enemy counter-attacks. After 'Goodwood' had failed to break through south of Caen, 53rd (W) Division relieved 15th (S) Division at the le Bon Repos crossroads during the night of 19/20 July. On 21 July the position came under heavy attack by 10th SS Panzer Division, losing some ground and suffering heavy casualties.

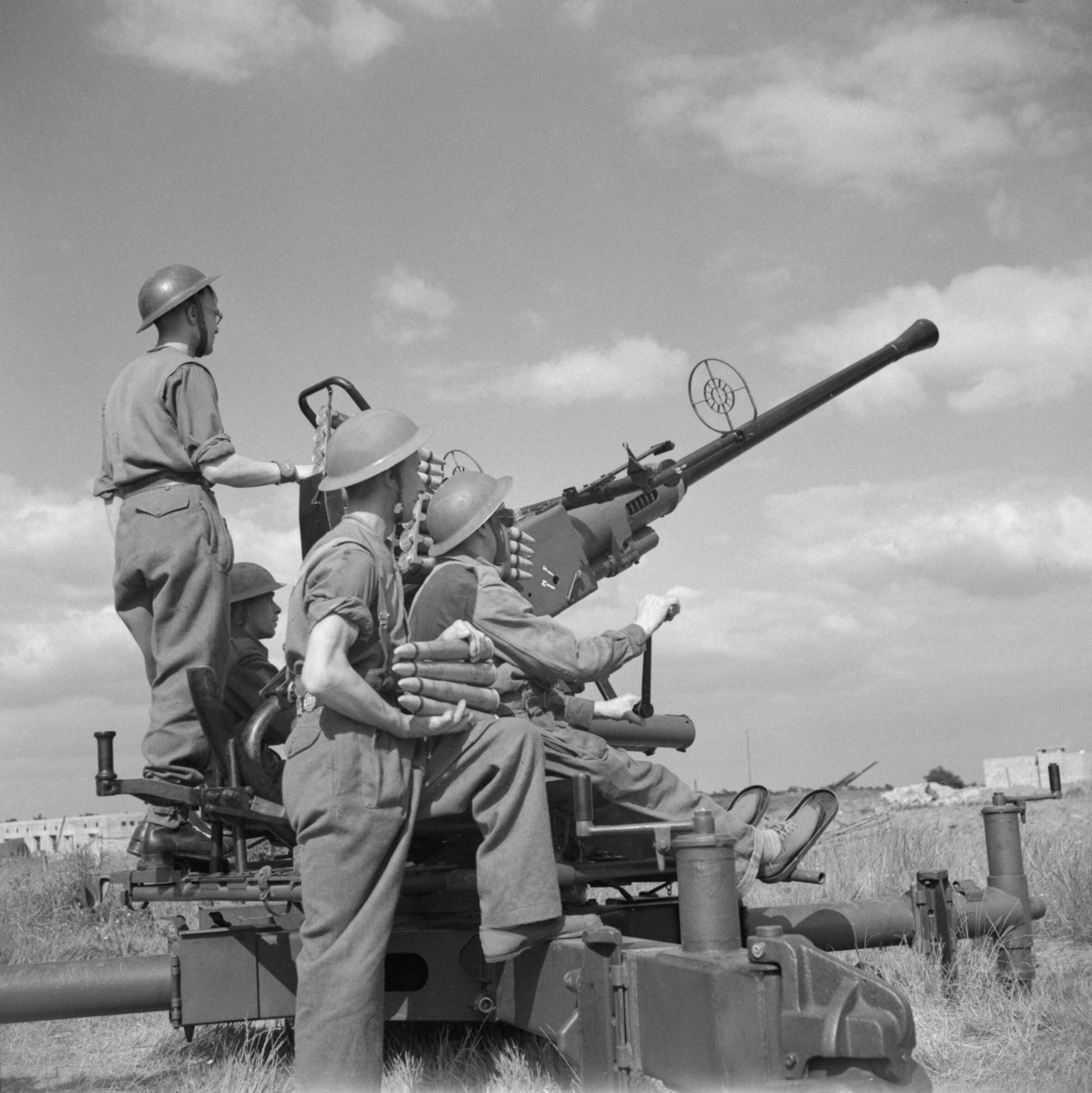
Bofors gun and crew, summer 1944.

Since the Allies had achieved air superiority over the beachhead, there was little call for AA defence, and AA units became increasingly used to supplement the divisional artillery to support ground operations. LAA units fired tracer to guide night attacks onto their objectives, and the Bofors guns were much in demand for infantry support. They could give useful close-range fire to help infantry working from cover to cover in the constricted Bocage country; their rapid fire was good for suppressing enemy heavy weapons, the 40 mm round's sensitive percussion fuze providing an airburst effect among trees. It was also used for 'bunker-busting', though the lack of protection made the gun detachment vulnerable to return fire. LAA units also provided 'refuge strips' for air observation post aircraft spotting for the field guns: a Bofors troop deployed with Local Warning radar and ground observers could alert the pilot to the presence of enemy aircraft and provide protection for him.

XII Corps began pushing south in early August, with 53rd (W) Division clearing the east bank of the River Orne, while XXX Corps captured Mont Pinçon. 21st Army Group then endeavoured to close the northern side of the Falaise Gap to prevent the Germans escaping eastwards. By 18–19 August the division was in defensive positions west of Falaise, and on 20 August it captured Bazoches-au-Houlme.

After the Falaise Pocket was eliminated, XII and XXX Corps led 21st Army Group's rapid advance eastwards to the Seine. 15th (Scottish) Division seized bridgeheads on 27 August, and because the armour was not ready it was 53rd (W) Division that led the advance out of the bridgehead towards the Somme. On 30 August 53rd (W) Division was motoring forward with an open flank, but ran into a lot of scattered opposition. The Somme was crossed on 1 September. Opposition stiffened as the division pushed through La Bassée and Béthune on 3 September, but 7th Armoured Division bypassed this opposition and drove on while 53rd (W) Division stayed to 'mop up' and then struck north to Lille. By 6 September 21 Army Group had been halted at the lines of the Albert Canal and the Escaut Canal, where it regrouped.

Attacks by the Luftwaffe (which had lost its forward airfields) were light during this rapid advance, and AA defence of the bridges and other vital points was quickly taken over by the follow-up AA brigades, leaving divisional LAA units to drive on with their parent formations.

== North West Europe ==
XII Corps had a relatively minor role in Operation Market Garden, XXX Corps' attempt to 'bounce' a succession of bridges as far as Arnhem on the Rhine. However, 53rd (W) Division was engaged in heavy fighting to cross the Junction Canal and then clear the Wilhelmina Canal on XXX Corps' left flank. After the failure at Arnhem, the division continued to push forwards in Operation Pheasant, gaining a foothold in 's-Hertogenbosch on 26 October. It was then moved south to face the 'Venlo Pocket' along the west bank of the River Maas.

== Disbandment ==
116th LAA Regiment remained with 53rd (Welsh) Division until 2 December 1944. By then, 21st Army Group was suffering an acute manpower crisis, particularly among the infantry, and surplus units and formations were being disbanded to provide drafts. The veteran 50th (Northumbrian) Infantry Division was broken up, and its air defence unit, 25th LAA Rgt (a pre-war Territorial Army regiment), was assigned to 53rd (W) Division. In consequence the more junior war-formed 116th LAA Rgt was broken up to provide reinforcements, and was officially disbanded on 31 January 1945.

The regiment's number was re-used for another LAA unit in 1947.

== External sources ==
- Land Forces of Britain, the Empire and Commonwealth – Regiments.org (archive site)
- Royal Artillery 1939–1945
