= 93rd Light Anti-Aircraft Regiment, Royal Artillery =

8th Bn Loyal Regiment (North Lancashire) 93rd Light Anti-Aircraft Regiment, RA
- Active: 4 July 1940–15 November 1941 (8th Bn Loyals); 15 November 1941–January 1946 (93rd LAA Rgt)
- Country: United Kingdom
- Branch: British Army
- Role: Air Defence
- Size: Regiment
- Part of: 80th AA Brigade
- Engagements: D-Day; Defence of the Orne Bridges; Defence of Nijmegen Bridges; Operation Plunder

The 93rd Light Anti-Aircraft Regiment (93rd LAA Rgt) was an air defence unit of the British Army's Royal Artillery (RA) during World War II. Elements of the regiment landed with special equipment on D-Day, and served in the Normandy campaign. The regiment went on to defend Belgian cities against V-1 flying bombs and participated in the assault crossing of the Rhine.

== Origin ==
93rd LAA Regiment was formed in November 1941 by converting the 8th Battalion, Loyal Regiment (North Lancashire), a war service infantry battalion that had only been raised in the previous year as part of the rapid expansion of the British Army.

=== 8th Loyals ===
The 8th Bn Loyals was formed on 4 July 1940 at Ashton-under-Lyne, Lancashire, as a new unit. (A previous 8th Loyals had been a 'Kitchener's Army' battalion during World War I). The majority of the recruits were from Lancashire, particularly Liverpool, the officers from regiments in North West England (the commanding officer was Lieutenant-Colonel J. O'Sullivan of the Loyals), and the cadre of experienced non-commissioned officers and men was drawn from the Manchester Regiment's Machine Gun Training Centre at Ladysmith Barracks, Ashton-under-Lyne (who had to be re-trained in infantry work).

The battalion assembled in camp at Caernarfon, joining the newly raised 7th and 9th Battalions of the Loyals which (together with 12th Battalion Royal Welch Fusiliers) constituted No 15 Infantry Training Group. In October 1940 the 15th ITG became 215th Independent Infantry Brigade (Home), a home defence formation. Training was hampered by the shortage of rifles and equipment, and the tented camp became uninhabitable during winter gales. In January 1941 the 8th Battalion relocated to billets in disused mills at Biddulph, with B Company at Huyton.

In February the brigade transferred to the Durham and North Riding County Division in North East England, where it took up an operational role in beach defence. The 8th Battalion's headquarters (HQ) was at Saltburn-by-the-Sea and it took over the defences from Redcar Pier to Staithes. These included concrete pillboxes equipped with Vickers guns, for which the previous training of the battalion's original cadre was useful. The battalion moved to Shildon in County Durham in June and carried out exercises with 215 Bde along the River Tweed against Scottish Command before returning to Saltburn.

=== 93rd LAA Regiment ===
In November 1941, the county division and 215 Bde were disbanded. At this point the three battalions of the Loyals were converted from infantry to other roles: the 7th and 8th became the 92nd (Loyals) and 93rd Light Anti-Aircraft Regiments of the RA, while the 9th became 148th Regiment Royal Armoured Corps. The new 93rd LAA Regiment came into existence on 15 November, consisting of Regimental HQ (RHQ) and 320–322 LAA Batteries, still under the command of Lt-Col O'Sullivan. Cadres from 320 and 321 Btys went for retraining to 233rd LAA Training Rgt and 322 Bty to 212th LAA Training Rgt, both based at Saighton Camp, Chester, and the batteries then went to AA practice camps, while RHQ was established at Rugby. Surplus men were drafted on 26 November to 210th Heavy Anti-Aircraft Training Regiment at Oswestry where they joined a new 493 (Mixed) Heavy AA Bty that was being formed for 141st (Mixed) HAA Rgt ('Mixed' indicating that women from the Auxiliary Territorial Service were integrated into the unit's personnel).

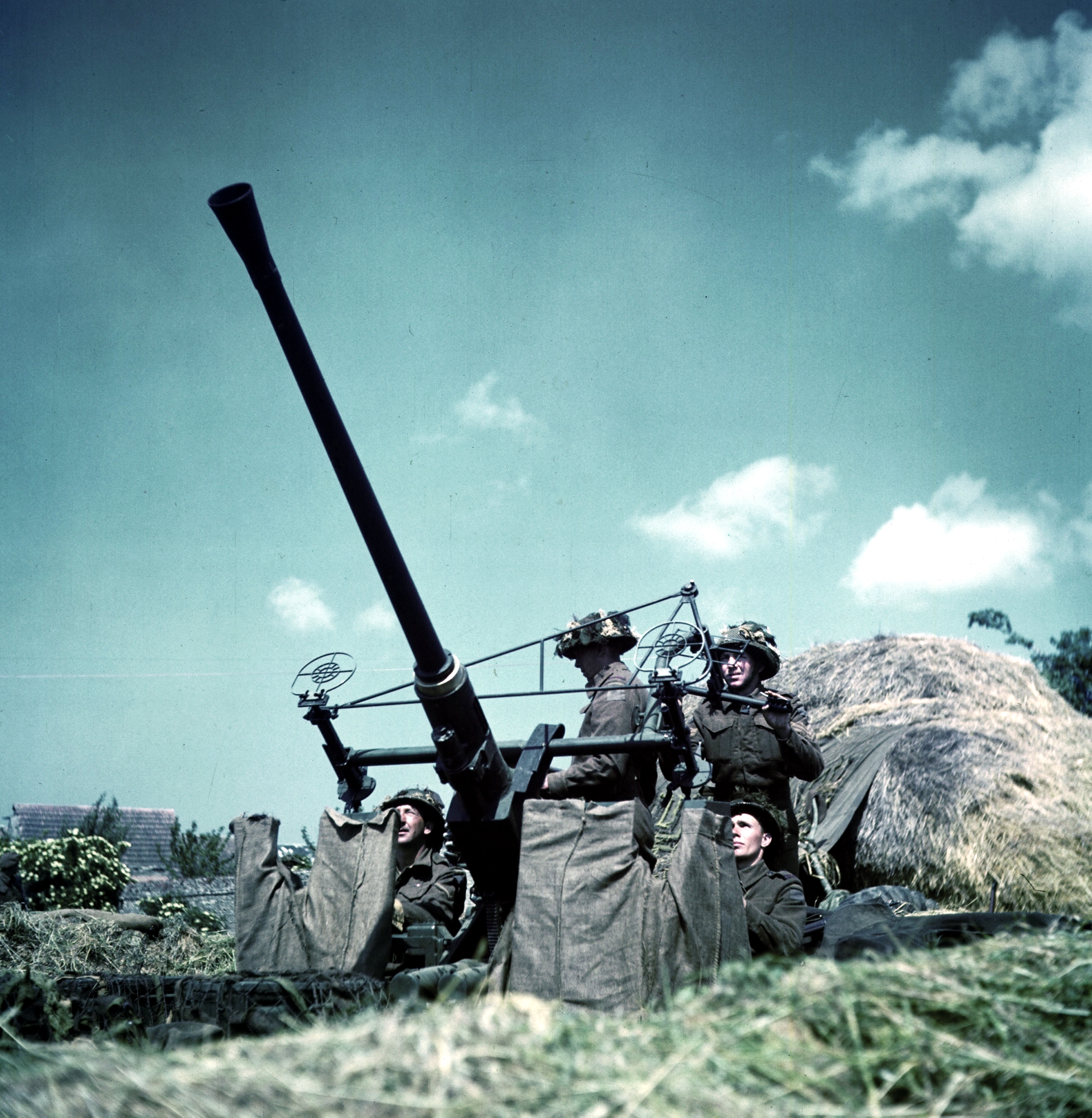
Bofors 40mm LAA gun

In January 1942 the regiment moved to Waitwith Camp, Catterick Garrison, to join 42nd Support Group in 42nd Armoured Division, which had recently been converted from the 42nd (East Lancashire) Infantry Division. Support Groups at the time consisted of a brigade of mobile field, anti-tank and LAA artillery together with lorried infantry, intended to support the armoured brigades of the division. The LAA regiment was equipped with Bofors 40 mm guns. However, the support group concept was soon scrapped and from 1 June 1942 the regiment served directly under the HQ RA of 42nd Armoured Division.

Mobile training was carried out at Rainham in Essex in April 1942 and field firing at No 16 LAA Practice Camp at Clacton-on-Sea in May and June. RHQ moved to Blenheim Terrace, Scarborough, in June, and then to Bridlington in November. When not training, LAA regiments often assisted Anti-Aircraft Command as part of Air Defence of Great Britain. In December 1942, 93rd LAA Rgt was deployed along the Sussex coast, which was subject to 'hit and run' raids by the Luftwaffe. RHQ was at Hove, 320 Bty at Seaford and Pevensey, 321 Bty at Newhaven and 322 Bty at Eastbourne. A detachment of 322 Bty on Eastbourne Pier continued to man their gun even when the pier was damaged by a mine explosion. At the end of the year 322 Bty moved to Brighton, where on 29 March 1943 it opened fire at eight enemy aircraft and claimed one hit. Training resumed in May, with 93rd LAA Rgt again going to Clacton and then on exercises with 42nd Armoured Division.

== Training for Overlord ==
42nd Armoured Division itself was disbanded in October 1943 and 93rd LAA Rgt served for a while in Suffolk and Kent with AA Command. Lieutenant-Colonel W.F. Holman took command of the regiment in November 1943 and it came under the control of 80th AA Brigade on 9 December. 80th AA Brigade was a mobile formation organised in Home Forces specifically for the planned invasion of Europe (Operation Overlord). The regiment was given a special assault role, equipped with 20 mm Oerlikon or the new 20 mm Polsten guns in triple mountings, half of them mounted on Crusader tank chassis.

It joined 80th AA Bde at Oxted in Surrey at the beginning of January 1944, from where it sent subunits and personnel for battle training and practice in waterproofing vehicles, assault landing and tank driving. As a mobile unit it had its own Royal Electrical and Mechanical Engineers (REME) workshop attached. In April it moved to Rustington in Sussex, from where in mid-May the batteries were sent to the Overlord concentration areas in Hampshire.

== D-Day ==
For the Normandy landings, 80th AA Brigade was assigned to support I Corps landing on Juno and Sword Beaches, while 76th AA Brigade supported XXX Corps on Gold Beach. The leading elements were to land with the assault waves on D-Day itself (6 June). Light AA defence was emphasised at the start of the operation, since low-level attack by German aircraft was considered the most likely threat. The LAA regiments involved in the initial landings were on minimum scales of equipment, to be brought up to strength by parties arriving later. In the early phases, 93rd LAA Rgt's RHQ remained in England while its batteries were employed separately to supplement 40 mm defences:

- 320 Bty (A, B and C Trps) was under command of 120th LAA Rgt (76th AA Bde) landing on Gold Beach
- D Troop, 321 Bty, was part of 'O' AA Assault Group on Juno Beach under command of 114th LAA Rgt (80th AA Bde) landing on Mike Sector of Juno Beach
- E Trp, 321 Bty, was part of 'P' AA Assault Group under command of 86th HAA Rgt (80th AA Bde) landing on Nan Sector of Juno Beach
- F Trp, 321 Bty, remained in reserve offshore
- G and H Trps, 322 Bty, were part of 'M' AA Assault Group under command of 73rd LAA Rgt (80th AA Bde) landing on Sword Beach
- I Trp, 322 Bty, was part of 'N' AA Assault Group under command of 103rd HAA Rgt (80th AA Bde) landing on Sword Beach

Each battery consisted of 18 triple 20 mm mountings, of which nine were mounted on Crusaders. At Juno, the Crusaders each towed one of the trailer-mounted triple Polstens. The assault groups were transported from Southampton in Landing craft tank (LCTs), while the follow-up elements sailed from Felixstowe through the Straits of Dover.

The recce group of A Trp, 320 Bty, landed at King Red sector of Gold Beach in the first 90 minutes without too much difficulty. While digging in, Gunner George Perry noticed two men on a sinking DUKW and swam out with a rope, under fire, to rescue them. He was subsequently awarded a Military Medal (MM). A Troop's guns (three Crusader SP and three towed) on LSTs 344 and 345 arrived late at King Red sector but were ready for action at 16.15.

At midnight, the AA Defence Commander on Gold Beach reported that he had six triple 20mm mountings in King Sector and two in Jig Sector.

On Juno Beach, the reconnaissance party of D Troop was due to land at 10.30, but arrived at 13.15, followed at 19.00 by the guns, which deployed around the beach exits. E/321 Troop landed on Nan Green sector at 17.00 and was ready for action at the beach exit by 18.30.

On Sword, the CO of G Troop landed 45 minutes after H-Hour and because the recce parties of H and I Trps were delayed, he reconnoitred positions for the whole of 322 Bty. The battery was shelled and mortared as it came ashore, and lost 10 men killed and six wounded, but all of G Trp's guns were in position by 4 1(1/2) hours after H-Hour. H and I Trps arrived on D + 1.

At dawn on D+1 the AA positions on Mike Green sector were dive-bombed by a Messerschmitt Bf 109 dropping out of low cloud; D Trp claimed some hits with their 20mm.

C Troop had embarked in LST 3760 at Felixstowe and arrived off the beaches late on D-Day. The gunners manned the naval AA guns during the night, firing against enemy raiders. The guns were landed at Jig sector and all were in action by 20.00 on D + 1.

F/321 Trp remained anchored off the beaches from 23.00 on D-Day until it landed at Mike Red at 06.00 on D+2. The troop commander was killed on D+3 when his Jeep ran over a mine on the beach.

Four Polsten mountings from 93rd LAA went to the Orne and Caen Canal bridges at Benouville on D+3, where they joined the SP Bofors guns of 92nd (Loyals) LAA Rgt where the bridges and strongpoints held by 6th Airborne Division were subjected to repeated heavy air attacks.

By D+4, 76 AA Bde had 14 20 mm mountings among its landed units, with which it was extending AA coverage from Gold Beach towards Port-en-Bessin and Arromanches (site of the vital Mulberry Harbour under construction).

== Normandy ==
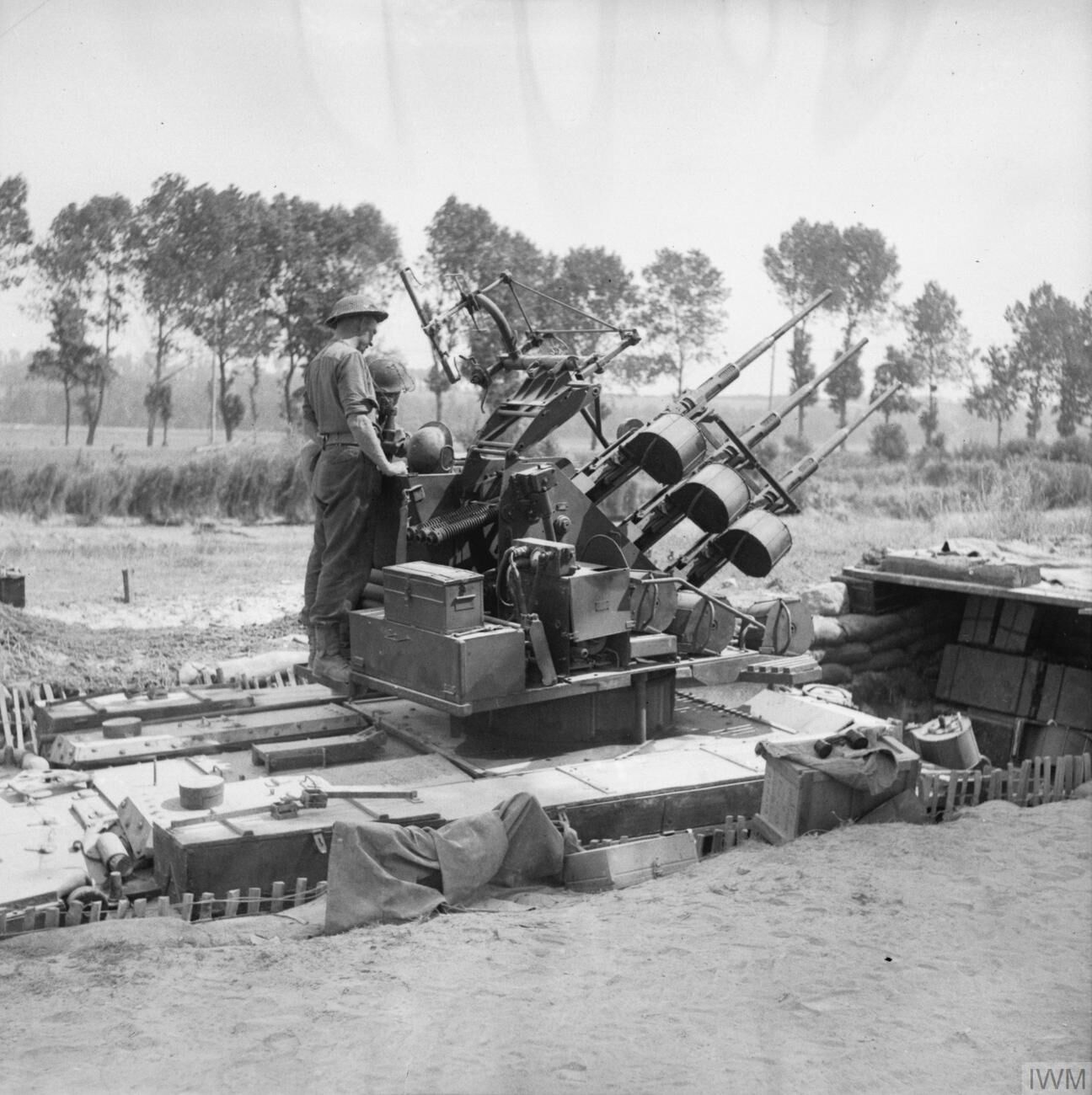
Crusader AA tank mounting a triple 20mm gun in a hull-down position, 19 July 1944

Lt-Col Holman left England on 9 June (D+3) to join his troops in Normandy, but the rest of RHQ remained behind until 12 July. RHQ was finally established at Plumetot on 16 July. Since the early days after the landing, the batteries had been disposed with 320 Bty HQ at Asnelles with its detachments manning 20 mm guns on the 'Mulberry' piers under 76th AA Bde; 321 Bty HQ at Ouistreham, with D Tp at Courseulles-sur-Mer on the coast and E and F Tps defending the bridges across the River Orne and the Caen Canal, and 322 Bty HQ at Cresserons (under command of 73rd LAA Rgt), with H Tp on the coast at Petit-Enfer, and G and I Tps at the river and canal bridges. On 5 July one of 322 Bty's Crusaders was hit by shellfire, but the driver drove it clear. On 9 July, another Crusader of 322 Bty was drowned when the River Orne burst its banks. 322 Bty reverted to 93rd LAA command on 18 July.

At the end of July, 320 Bty joined the rest of the regiment around the bridges, and in the last week of August 321 Bty was placed in direct support of 6th Airborne Division east of the Orne. During almost three months in the beachhead, the regiment's guns had shot down a sizeable but unknown number of enemy aircraft.

== North West Europe ==
At the end of August, 21st Army Group broke out from the Normandy beachhead and began to pursue the defeated German troops across Northern France. AA defence of the beachhead became less important and 80th AA Bde could be released from its commitments there in order to follow the advance. 93rd LAA Regiment was left at the Caen Canal and came under first 75th AA Bde, and then 105th AA Bde, except 321 Bty, which spent 5–21 September at Le Havre protecting 49th (West Riding) Infantry Division's HQ.

Shortly after returning to the regiment on the Caen Canal, 321 Bty was ordered forward to guard the bridges at Grave, Netherlands, (one Tp) and Nijmegen (two Tps), which had been captured during Operation Market Garden. These bridges were frequently attacked by air and by shelling, and the battery suffered some casualties. Meanwhile, the rest of the regiment had come under the control of 51st AA Defence HQ, responsible for air defence of the supply lines back to Normandy. RHQ was at Rouen, with 320 Bty guarding the river crossings of the Seine and 322 Bty deployed at Caen and Boulogne.

For their work during the winter campaign in Belgium, several officers and men of the regiment were later awarded British or Belgian gallantry medals.

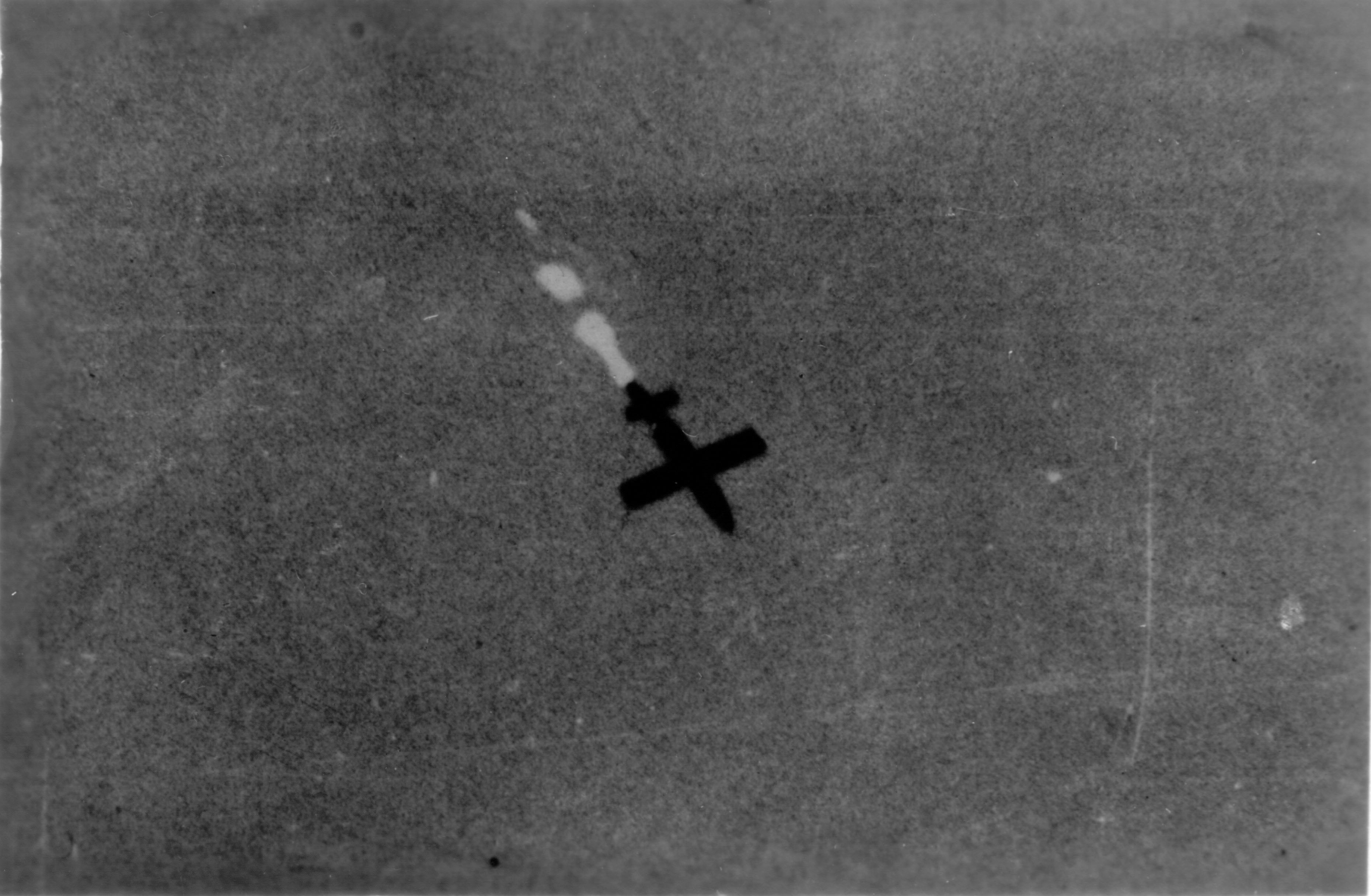
V-1 in flight over Antwerp

In November, 322 Bty began to re-equip with Canadian Ford 4 x 4 three-tonner truck mountings for its triple 20 mm guns. By the end of the year, 322 Bty was deployed to the Siege of Dunkirk and 320 Bty was also completing its re-equipment, with part of C Trp joining the 'Brussels X' line defending that city against V-1 flying bombs (codenamed 'Divers'). By early 1945, the V-1 threat to Brussels had diminished and 93rd LAA's guns in the 'Brussels X' defences were switched to defending airfields.

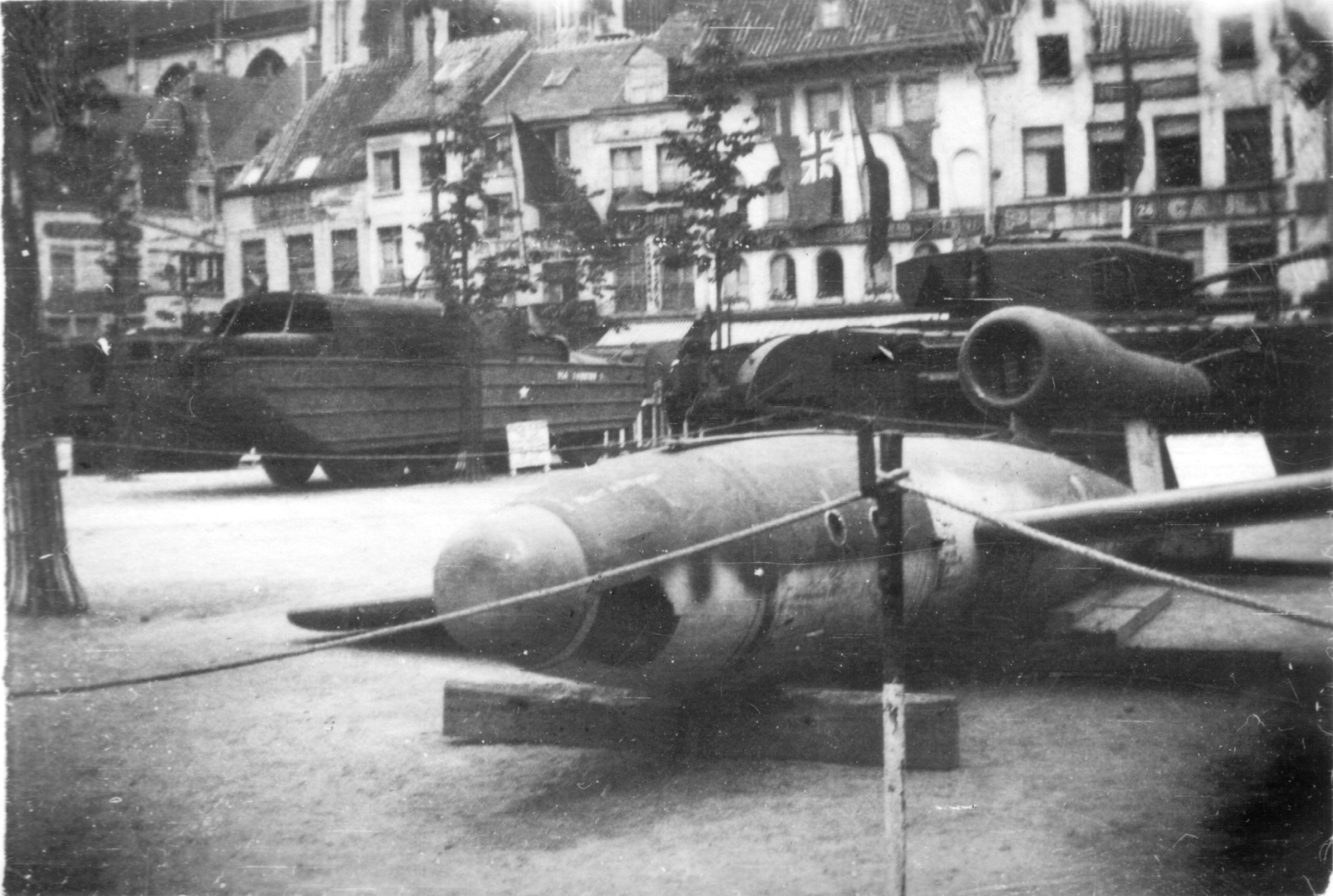
Captured V-1 displayed at Antwerp at the end of World War II.

In January 1945, 320 Bty was deployed protecting airfields and then took over from 321 Bty at Nijmegen when that battery returned to Arras to re-equip. The batteries regularly moved from one brigade HQ to another as they were redeployed to protect different airfields. At the end of the month, RHQ, 320 Bty and 93 LAA Workshop were at Rixensart under 103 AA Bde, 321 Bty was defending airfields near Arras with 74 AA Bde and 322 Bty was with 107 AA Bde.

H Troop of 322 Bty was experimentally deployed under US Army command NE of Antwerp to tackle V-1s aimed at that vital port. Between 4 February and 15 March, Serjeant Albert Richardson's detachment destroyed nine V-1s, one of which exploded 50 yards from the gun position and caused damage. Serjeant Richardson was later awarded a US Bronze Star for his leadership and gallantry.

In February, Lt-Col Holman relinquished command of the regiment and was replaced by Lt-Col W. Odling, MC.

== Operation Plunder ==
The regiment was heavily involved in the assault crossing of the Rhine (Operation Plunder). This began when 21st Army Group requisitioned transport vehicles from 75th and 76th AA Bdes to transport engineering equipment in preparation for the operation; 93rd LAA Rgt provided a small HQ and REME detachment for these units.

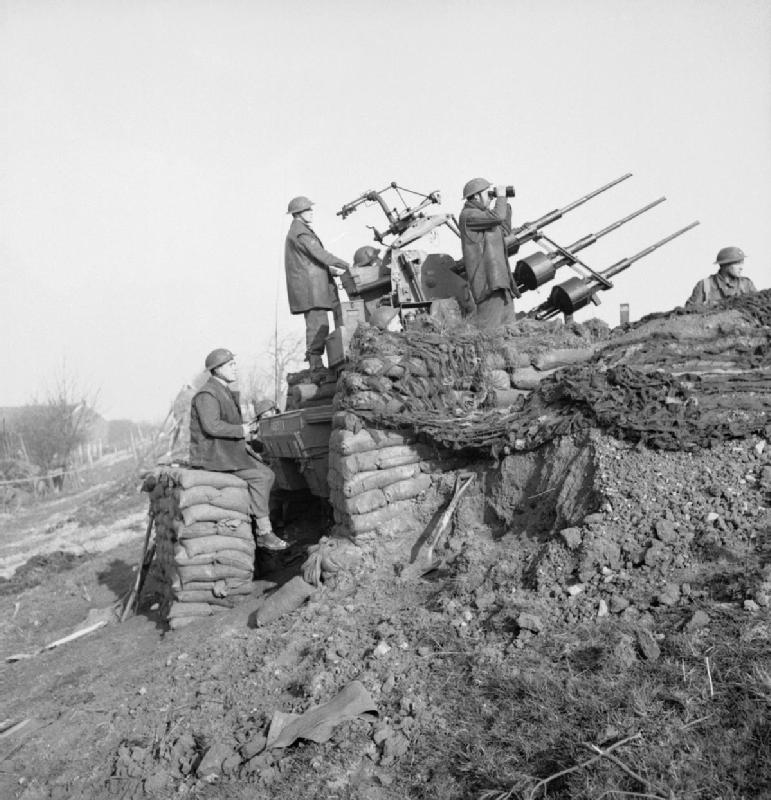
Triple 20 mm LAA mounting on the bank of the Rhine, 25 March 1945.

The regiment was given a special role in Operation Plunder because its truck mounts were the only LAA guns that could be ferried over the river on a Class 9 raft. In mid-March, the batteries were concentrated and reorganised on a light scale, similar to that adopted for the D-Day landings. The three batteries were divided among the three corps taking part in the operation:

- Tactical HQ and 321 Bty under 106 AA Bde supporting XXX Corps' crossing at Rees
- 322 Bty under 100 AA Bde, supporting XII Corps' crossing at Xanten
- 320 Bty (less one Trp at Nijmegen) later added to 107 AA Bde, supporting II Canadian Corps' crossing at Emmerich
- Rear HQ remained at Rixensart

321 and 322 Batteries moved from their Belgian concentration areas and crossed the River Maas on the night of 19/20 March to enter their forward concentration areas hidden in woods. 320 Battery was added to the operation and given similar instructions. The assault crossing was to be made at night, but 322 Bty on XII Corps' front would be drawn up in the open in full moonlight. Consequently, it was shelled, mortared and machine gunned before the crossing even began, but the battery commander, Major John Frame, had carefully reconnoitred the position and deployed to minimise casualties; he was later awarded a Military Cross (MC). Half of the battery was rafted across during D-Day and set up on the east bank to protect the bridgehead. The battery had suffered 3 other ranks killed and one officer and 3 ORs wounded and had lost two SP vehicles (but not their triple mountings) to direct hits. Captain Norman Wright, a troop commander in 322 Bty, was later awarded a MC for his leadership on this occasion and during the Diver deployment.

XXX Corps was held up by strong opposition round Rees, and the priority was to get reinforcements, tanks and field guns across rather than AA guns. Luckily, the Luftwaffe was hardly seen during the night assaults or D-Day itself. Air attacks only began after dark on D-Day, and the LAA guns were effective in driving attacking aircraft up to heights where the HAA guns with their radar and predictors could deal with them. XXX Corps got its first bridges operational early on D+2, and 321 Bty immediately crossed to protect the east end. All the AA positions in the east bank had to be well dug in, with assistance from the Pioneer Corps. The two troops of 320 Bty deployed on 30/31 March to protect II Canadian Corps' work on the bridges at Emmerich.

As 21st Army Group began its advance across Germany, most of 93rd LAA Rgt was sent back to Antwerp, but then returned to reoccupy its positions guarding the Rhine crossings from air or waterborne attack, though 320 Bty accompanied First Canadian Army in its final operations. As the war drew to its close, the regiment became increasingly engaged in occupation duties. After VE Day the regiment concentrated at Xanten, the first time all subunits had been together for a year.

== Disbandment ==
After the end of the war in Europe, 93rd LAA Rgt handed in its AA guns and came under command of 80th AA Bde at Eutin in Schleswig-Holstein, engaged in guarding and repatriating prisoners of war and displaced persons (Operation Clobber), and in internal security exercised through the Wehrmacht Control Police. The regiment was disbanded at Eutin on 9 January 1946.

== Online sources ==
- Lancashire Infantry Museum
- Land Forces of Britain, the Empire and Commonwealth (Regiments.org) (archive site)
- Royal Artillery 1939–1945
- Royal Artillery Units Netherlands 1944–1945
