= II Anti-Aircraft Corps =

2 Anti-Aircraft Corps
- Formation sign of II Anti-Aircraft Corps, a device from the coat of arms of the corps GOC Lieutenant-General M. F. Grove-White.
- Active: 11 November 1940 – 30 September 1942
- Country: United Kingdom
- Branch: British Army
- Type: Anti-Aircraft corps
- Role: Air Defence
- Part of: Anti-Aircraft Command
- Garrison/HQ: Hucknall
- Engagements: The Blitz; Baedeker Blitz

II Anti-Aircraft Corps (II AA Corps) was a high-level formation of Britain's Anti-Aircraft Command from 1940 to 1942. It defended the Midlands and North West of England and Wales during the Blitz and the middle years of the Second World War.

== Origin ==
AA Command had been created in 1938 to control the Territorial Army's rapidly-expanding anti-aircraft (AA) organisation within Air Defence of Great Britain. On the outbreak of war in September 1939, it commanded seven AA Divisions, each with several AA Brigades, disposed around the United Kingdom. Continued expansion made this organisation unwieldy, so in November 1940 – during the Luftwaffe's nightly Blitz on London and other British cities – five further AA Divisions were organised, and all the divisions grouped under three corps headquarters directly subordinate to AA Command. II AA Corps covered the Midlands and North West of England and North Wales, and by February 1941 comprised four AA divisions and 14 brigades. Its boundaries roughly coincided with No. 9 Group RAF and No. 12 Group RAF of RAF Fighter Command.

== Order of battle ==
II AA Corps had the following organisation from February 1941:

Corps HQ: Hucknall, Nottinghamshire

General Officer Commanding: Lieutenant-General M. F. Grove-White

=== 2nd AA Division ===
- 32nd (Midland) Anti-Aircraft Brigade (East Midlands, sector layout)
- 40th Anti-Aircraft Brigade (Airfields, sectors)
- 41st (London) Anti-Aircraft Brigade (East Anglia, sectors)
- 50th Light Anti-Aircraft Brigade (Derby, Nottingham)
- 66th Anti-Aircraft Brigade formed by May 1941

=== 4th AA Division ===
- 33rd (Western) Anti-Aircraft Brigade (Liverpool)
- 44th Anti-Aircraft Brigade (Manchester)
- 53rd Light Anti-Aircraft Brigade (North Midlands, sectors)
- 70th Anti-Aircraft Brigade joined in late June 1941

=== 10th AA Division ===
- 31st (North Midland) Anti-Aircraft Brigade (West Yorkshire, sectors)
- 39th Anti-Aircraft Brigade (Humber, Scunthorpe)
- 62nd Anti-Aircraft Brigade (Leeds, Sheffield)
- 70th Anti-Aircraft Brigade joined in early June 1941, then moved to 4 AA Div

=== 11th AA Division ===
- 1st Anti-Aircraft Brigade (Crewe, sectors) War Office reserve; left AA Command by May 1941
- 34th (South Midland) Anti-Aircraft Brigade (Birmingham, Coventry)
- 54th Anti-Aircraft Brigade (West Midlands, Gun Defence Areas, sectors)
- 67th Anti-Aircraft Brigade formed by May 1941
- 68th Anti-Aircraft Brigade formed by May 1941

=== Intermediate Ammunition Depots ===
- Rainford, St Helens
- Barlow, near Selby
- Bletchley (27 ASD; controlled by War Office)
- Weedon Ordnance Depot

=== Equipment Ammunition Magazines ===
- Paull Point, near Hull
- New Holland, Lincolnshire
- Leeds (Morley)
- Sheffield North
- Manchester (Barton)
- Liverpool (Laysbrook)
- Upton, Birkenhead
- Market Drayton, Shropshire
- Coventry (Foleshill)
- Hampton-in-Arden, Warwickshire
- Birmingham (Newtown)
- Derby (Findern)

== Operations ==
As soon as it was organised, II AA Corps had to deal with the 1940–41 Blitz on industrial cities and towns such as Barrow-in-Furness, Birmingham, Coventry, Derby, Hull, Leeds, Liverpool, Manchester, Nottingham and Sheffield. The corps was responsible for large Gun Defence Areas (GDAs) around Merseyside, Humberside and South Yorkshire, and the North and West Midlands, with 'Indicator Belts' and 'Killer Belts' of searchlights in between, the former working with the GDAs and RAF Sectors, the latter with the night fighters in the air. Redeployment was called for in 1942 when the Luftwaffe began the 'Baedeker raids' on towns and cities such as Norwich, King's Lynn and York that had previously warranted little AA defence.

== Disbandment ==
The AA Corps and Divisional HQs were disbanded in October 1942 and replaced by a more flexible system of AA Groups, each aligned with a Group of RAF Fighter Command. The area covered by II AA Corps became the responsibility of two of the new groups: 4th AA Group (North Wales and North West England) with 9 Group RAF, and 5th AA Group (North East England) with 12 Group RAF.

== External sources ==
- British Military History
- Generals of World War II
