= 71st (East Lancashire) Searchlight Regiment, Royal Artillery =

71st (East Lancashire) Searchlight Regiment, RA 606th (East Lancashire) Heavy Anti-Aircraft Regiment, RA
- Royal Artillery cap badge (pre-1953)
- Active: 1 November 1938 – 10 March 1955
- Country: United Kingdom
- Branch: Territorial Army
- Type: Searchlight Regiment
- Role: Air Defence
- Size: Regiment
- Garrison/HQ: Failsworth; Rusholme
- Engagements: The Blitz

The 71st (East Lancashire) Searchlight Regiment, Royal Artillery was an air defence unit of Britain's Territorial Army (TA), which was raised just before the outbreak of World War II and served as part of Anti-Aircraft Command during and after the war.

== Origin ==
As the international situation deteriorated in the late 1930s, the threat of air raids on the UK led to the rapid expansion in the number of anti-aircraft (AA) units manned by members of the part-time TA. Ordered in August 1938 and formed on 1 November 1938, the unit was one of the first three TA searchlight regiments raised by the Royal Artillery (previous TA S/L units had all been part of the Royal Engineers and/or converted from infantry battalions). It consisted of Regimental Headquarters (RHQ) and Nos 462–464 Companies (later Batteries), with RHQ and two batteries at Failsworth, near Manchester, and one battery at a purpose-built drill hall at Norman Road, Rusholme, Manchester (completed in early 1940). The first recruit was sworn in on 8 November and by 22 June 1939 the regiment had reached its full strength, including a regimental band. It was equipped with the new '90 cm Projector Anti-Aircraft', a smaller and lighter piece of equipment than previous searchlights, with a more powerful high current density arc lamp with automatic carbon feed.

90 cm Projector Anti-Aircraft, displayed at Fort Nelson, Portsmouth

== World War II ==
Anti-Aircraft Command mobilised in August 1939, ahead of the declaration of war on 3 September, and the regiment took its place in the 44th AA Brigade, part of the 4th AA Division tasked with defending the North West and North Midlands of England. 71st (East Lancs) S/L Rgt deployed around Manchester. As a new regiment, it received instructors from the neighbouring 39th AA Battalion, Royal Engineers.

In 1940, the regiment transferred to 53 Light AA Bde, covering the North Midlands. The regiment supplied a cadre of experienced officers and men to 234th S/L Training Rgt at Carlisle where it provided the basis for a new 529 S/L Bty formed on 14 November 1940. This battery later joined 87th S/L Rgt. 516 Searchlight Bty, formed on 15 September, was regimented with 71st (East Lancs) S/L Rgt from 29 November 1940.

The industrial cities of the North Midlands were targets for night bombing by the German Luftwaffe during the winter of 1940–41, the Nottingham Blitz on 8/9 May 1941 being a notable example. In 1941, the searchlight layout over the Midlands was reorganised, so that any hostile raid approaching the Gun Defended Areas (GDA) around the towns must cross more than one searchlight belt, and then within the GDAs the concentration of lights was increased.

By the beginning of June 1941, RHQ with 462, 463 and 516 S/L Btys had moved to Orkney to join 58 AA Bde in the Orkney and Shetland Defence Force (OSDEF) defending the Royal Navy's base at Scapa Flow. 464 Searchlight Bty remained in 53 AA Bde in 4th AA Division, attached to 62nd (Loyals) S/L Rgt.

When the regiment returned to England in February 1942, it left 516 S/L Bty in Orkney attached to 59th (Warwickshire) S/L Rgt, to which regiment it was formally transferred on 19 March 1943. 71st (East Lancs) S/L Rgt rejoined 464 S/L Bty in 53 AA Bde in 4th AA Division, deployed in the Liverpool area.

In April 1943, it was redeployed to the command of 5 AA Bde on the South Coast of England at short notice to combat the campaign of 'hit and run' attacks on coastal towns begun by the Luftwaffe in March. AA Command urgently required light AA (LAA) guns to deal with these fast-moving daylight attacks by fighter-bombers, and S/L units were retrained to operate twin Vickers 0.5-inch machine guns in this role.

By now, AA Command was suffering a manpower crisis: it was required to release units and personnel to the field armies and was still short of LAA gun units, but it was over-provided with S/L units. The solution was to convert existing S/L units or to disband them and redistribute the personnel. On 31 May 1943, RHQ and the three batteries of 71st (East Lancs) S/L Rgt were all reduced to cadres, with the men being sent to reinforce LAA units. On 14 March 1944, the regiment was considered to have lapsed into 'suspended animation'.

== Postwar ==
When the TA was reconstituted on 1 January 1947, 71st S/L Rgt was reformed at Rusholme, Manchester, as 606th (Mixed) Heavy Anti-Aircraft Regiment, RA (East Lancashire), ('Mixed' denoting that members of the Women's Royal Army Corps were integrated into the unit). It was under the command of Lt-Col C.W. Provis; RHQ and two batteries were at the drill hall at Norman Road, Rusholme, with an out-station at Flixton, six miles (9.7 km) from Rusholme. A 3.7-inch HAA gun was installed in the drill hall for instructional purposes, and the regiment also had a cadet detachment at Norman Road. It formed part of 70 AA Bde (reformed from the former 44 AA Bde).

When AA Command abolished on 10 March 1955, the regiment was amalgamated with other Manchester-based units to form 314 HAA Rgt, with 606 and 465 (Manchester Regiment) HAA Rgts together providing P (Manchester) Bty at Hulme, Manchester. The drill hall at Norman Road was taken over in June 1955 by 42 (East Lancashire) Signal Regiment, Royal Corps of Signals. Some of the surplus personnel of 606 HAA Rgt transferred to 42 Signal Rgt, which also took over the cadet detachment.

== Memorial ==
On 1 January 1949, an oak clergy desk was unveiled in St John's Church, Failsworth, bearing the inscription: 'PRESENTED BY THE OFFICERS AND OTHER RANKS OF 71ST (E.L.) SEARCHLIGHT REGIMENT, ROYAL ARTILLERY T.A. TO COMMEMORATE THE FORMATION OF THE REGIMENT AND TO PERPETUATE ITS MEMORY 1938–1943'. The memorial is now lost.

== External sources ==
- Keith Brigstock 'Royal Artillery Searchlights', presentation to Royal Artillery Historical Society at Larkhill, 17 January 2007.
- British Military History
- British Army units from 1945 on
- Maj I.G. Kelly, 42 Signal Squadron History (archive site).
- Orders of Battle at Patriot Files
- Royal Artillery 1939–1945
- UK War Memorials Register
- Graham Watson, The Territorial Army 1947
