= 305th Infantry Brigade =

- Active: Formed 22 January 1945
- Country: United Kingdom
- Branch: British Army
- Type: Infantry Brigade
- Role: Lines of Communication

The 305th Infantry Brigade was a formation of the British Army organised from surplus Royal Artillery (RA) personnel retrained as infantry towards the end of the Second World War.

== Origin ==
By the end of 1944, 21st Army Group was suffering a severe manpower shortage, particularly among the infantry. In January 1945, the War Office began to reorganise surplus anti-aircraft and coastal artillery regiments in the UK into infantry battalions, primarily for line of communication and occupation duties in North West Europe, thereby releasing trained infantry for frontline service. the 305th Brigade was one of seven brigades formed from these new units.

== Composition ==
The 305th Infantry Brigade was formed on 22 January 1945 by conversion of the Headquarters of the 49th Anti-Aircraft Brigade within 2nd Anti-Aircraft Group. It was commanded by Brigadier R.C. Foot, followed by Brigadier M.A. Carthew from 4 July 1945, and comprised the following Territorial Army RA units:

- 622nd Infantry Regiment, Royal Artillery formed by 117th Heavy Anti-Aircraft Regiment, Royal Artillery.
- 624th Infantry Regiment, Royal Artillery formed by 82nd Light Anti-Aircraft Regiment RA (TA), which had briefly (January–April 1942) seen active service in North Africa as part of 1st Support Group in 1st Armoured Division.
- 639th (Essex Regiment) Infantry Regiment, Royal Artillery formed by 64th (Essex Regiment) Searchlight Regiment, Royal Artillery (TA), which had originally been converted from the 1/6th Battalion, Essex Regiment.

== Service ==
After infantry training, including a short period attached to the 55th (West Lancashire) Infantry Division, the 305th Brigade came under the orders of 21st Army Group on 18 April 1945, and landed on the Continent two days later.

== External sources ==
- Land Forces of Britain, The Empire and Commonwealth
- The Royal Artillery 1939–45
- The Patriot Files
