= 103rd Heavy Anti-Aircraft Regiment, Royal Artillery =

103rd Heavy Anti-Aircraft Regiment, RA
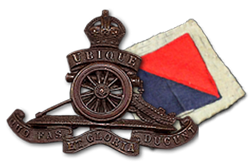
- Royal Artillery cap badge and AA patch
- Active: 20 May 1940–20 November 1945
- Country: United Kingdom
- Branch: Territorial Army
- Role: Air Defence
- Size: Regiment
- Engagements: Liverpool Blitz; D-Day; Normandy Campaign; Defence of Brussels

The 103rd Heavy Anti-Aircraft Regiment (103rd HAA Rgt) was an air defence unit of the British Army's Royal Artillery during World War II. It saw action during the Liverpool Blitz, landed on D-Day and served throughout the subsequent campaign in North West Europe and defended the cities of Belgium against V-1 flying bombs.

== Origin ==
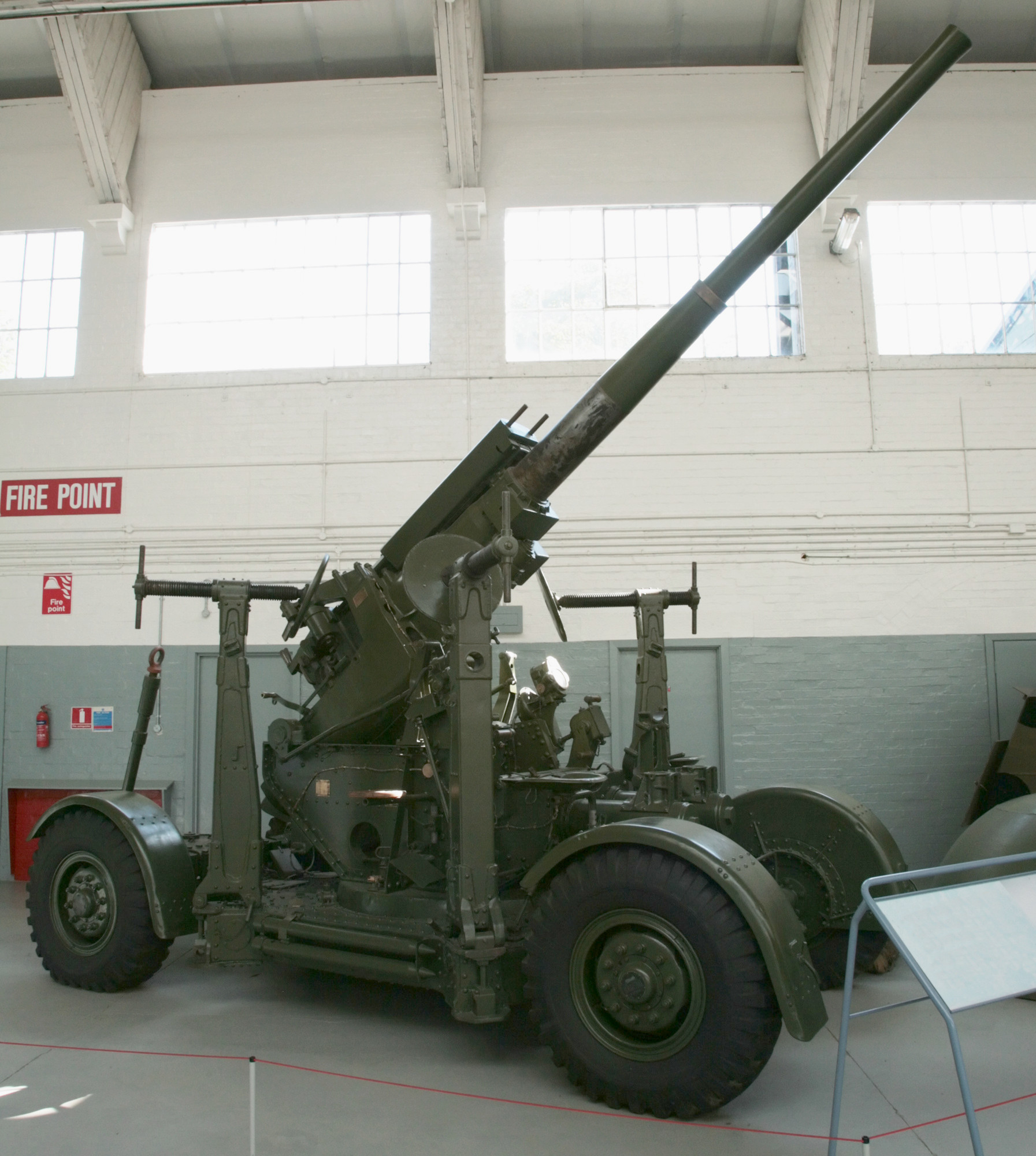
Mobile 3.7-inch HAA gun preserved at the Imperial War Museum, Duxford.

Regimental Headquarters (RHQ) was formed on 20 May 1940 at 211th AA Training Regiment (AATR) at Park Hall Camp, Oswestry, and the regiment comprised 322, 323 and 324 HAA Batteries, formed at 206th ("Arborfield), 210th (Oswestry) and 211th AATRs respectively. Although formally part of the Territorial Army (TA) – it was the first new TA HAA unit formed after the outbreak of war – it had no territorial affiliation.

Acting Lt-Col J.R.W. Curtois was appointed to command the regiment on 4 July. John Ralph Willoughby Curtois (1897–1970) had been commissioned into the Royal Artillery in 1915 and won a Military Cross during World War I. He was a major when war broke out, and was promoted to the substantive rank of Lt-Col on 15 June 1942.

The regiment was assigned to 33rd (Western) Anti-Aircraft Brigade in Liverpool, forming part of 4th AA Division. After attending practice camps, the batteries moved to Liverpool to take over gun sites from other regiments, including 93rd (3rd West Lancashire) HAA Rgt, which also transferred some of its men to the 103rd. These sites were variously equipped with static 4.5-inch, mobile or static 3.7-inch, or old 3-inch guns. RHQ was established at Gateacre, then at Woolton Park, and later at Croxteth Hall. The regiment's guns became operational on the night of 15/16 July, guarding against enemy aircraft laying Parachute mines in the Mersey, scoring its first 'kill' on 23/24 July.

== The Blitz ==
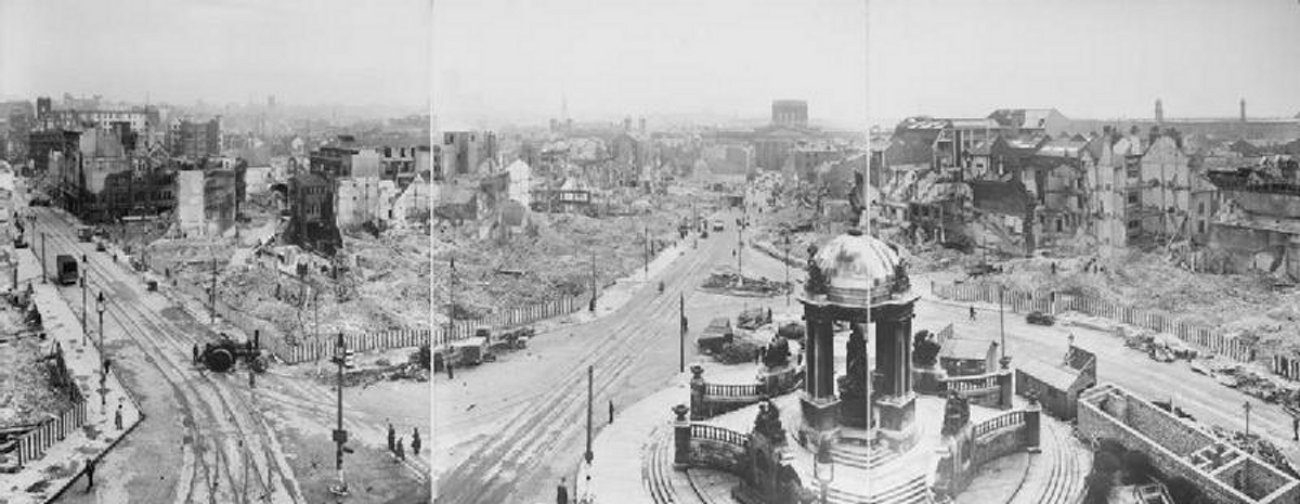
Panoramic view of bomb damage in Liverpool

During the summer of 1940, while the Battle of Britain raged over the skies of Southern England by day, there were also night raids on industrial cities. Liverpool was heavily attacked for four nights in a row from 28 August, and the regiment was in action almost nightly thereafter, firing almost 2000 rounds during a heavy attack on the night of 28/29 November.

In mid-November the regiment provided a cadre of experienced men to 211th AATR to form a new 390 Bty for the neighbouring 107th HAA Rgt. 93rd, 103rd and 107th HAA Rgts in 33rd AA Bde regularly exchanged gun sites around Liverpool and Birkenhead.

The night raids continued into the following Spring, during which period the city and its docks along the Mersey became the most heavily bombed area of Britain outside London. The campaign became known as the Liverpool Blitz, with particularly heavy attacks in December 1940 (the Christmas Blitz) when the regiment's ammunition expenditure rose to almost 3800 rounds per night; in April 1941; and again the following month (the May Blitz).

== Mobile training ==
In May 1941 the regiment began to reorganise as a mobile unit, with additional vehicles. It began mobile training in August and then took part in large scale exercises before returning to the Mersey sites in the autumn, where it was regularly in action again.

In the autumn of 1940 the regiment had sent a cadre to 210th AATR at Oswestry to provide the basis for a new 390 Bty; this was formed on 14 November 1940 and later joined 107th HAA Rgt. Shortly afterwards, 107th HAA Rgt supplied a cadre to 207th AATR at Devizes, which was formed on 10 April 1941 and was regimented with 103rd HAA Rgt on 7 July, immediately taking over some gun sites. Although the regiment remained under AA Command, it was now assigned to the War Office Reserve, ready to be transferred to a mobile field force. The regiment now formed A3 (Heavy) AA Signal Detachment RA, which went to 1st Artillery Signal Section Training Regiment for instruction.

In February 1942 the Mersey received its first daylight air raid for over a year. The regiment remained in 33rd AA Bde until April 1942, when it transferred to 55th AA Bde in 8th AA Division in Cornwall. RHQ and 323 Btys were established at St Ives, 322 Bty at Truro and 324 Bty at Penzance. 420 Bty transferred to a new 140 HAA Rgt on 19 April.

In West Cornwall the main threat was from low level 'hit and run' raids by single-engined Luftwaffe aircraft (such as attacks by pairs of Focke-Wulf Fw 190s on St Ives on 28 August and Truro on 7 September), which were difficult for HAA guns to engage. Night raids on Truro on 24 September and on Penzance two nights later were engaged by the regiment with both HAA and light machine guns.

Apart from a short training deployment in Hampshire in the summer (when the regiment formed a temporary No 7 Troop to continue manning a site at Land's End), 103rd HAA Rgt remained in Cornwall until October 1942. 322 Bty handed over its sites and became non-operational on 28 October, and then the whole regiment was relieved on 20 November and moved to join the RA Battle Training Group at Hertford for mobile training. Mobile HAA regiments had an establishment of three batteries each of two troops, with a total of 24 towed 3.7-inch They also had their own Royal Corps of Signals signal detachment, and a Royal Electrical and Mechanical Engineers (REME) workshop, which was permanently attached to the regiment from 1 December.

== Training for Overlord ==
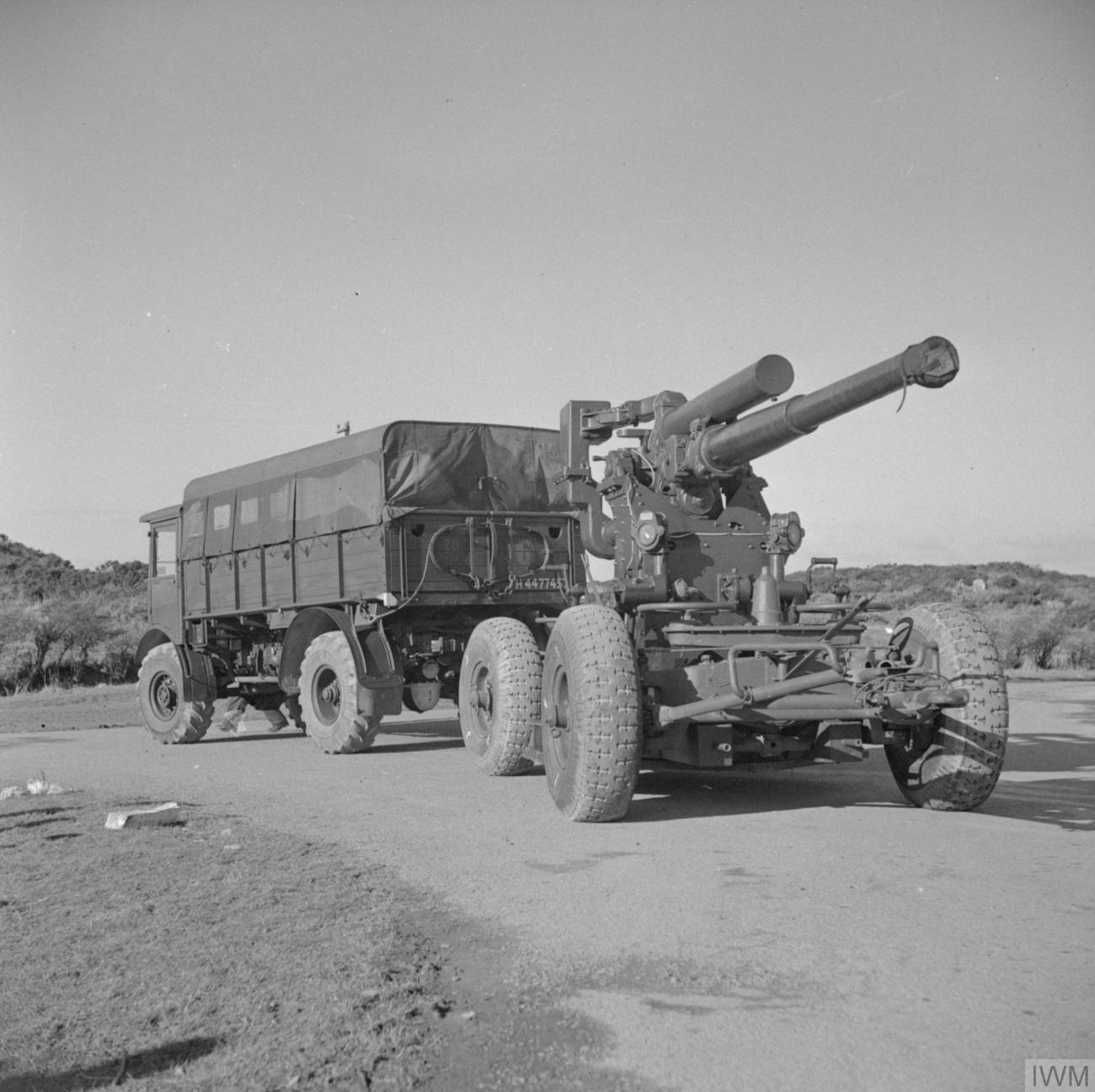
AEC Matador artillery tractor towing a 3.7-inch HAA gun in Scotland, February 1944.

The regiment left AA Command and joined the newly-formed 76th AA Bde at Blandford Camp on 21 December 1942. Then when 80th AA Bde was formed at Blandford in April 1943, 103rd HAA Rgt transferred to its command. Both 76th and 80th AA Bdes were mobile formations organised in Home Forces specifically for the planned invasion of Europe (Operation Overlord).

In March and April the regiment handed over its 3.7-inch guns to active regiments in AA Command and re-equipped with the obsolescent 3-inch gun for mobile training. This included beach landing demonstrations and training with the Beach groups that had been formed for Overlord. 220 Battery of 73rd LAA Rgt, assigned to the same beach group, also joined the regiment for training. During the summer of 1943, the regiment trained intensively, attending gunnery practice camps at Redesdale and Ramsgate, training for beach landings in Scotland and Pembrokeshire, and then another practice camp at Whitby in November. That month the regiment handed in its 3-inch guns and was fully equipped with 24 of the modern 3.7-inch gun. At the end of the year the regiment was stationed across Ross & Cromarty and Renfrewshire.

Lieutenant-Colonel Curtois was replaced as CO on 16 February 1944 by Lt-Col H.E. Johnston. Howard Erskine Johnston had experienced rapid promotion since he had been commissioned as a TA 2nd Lieutenant in the 93rd HAA Rgt early in 1939, becoming an acting Lt-Col in November 1942.

Training continued in Scotland during early 1944, alongside 3rd British Division, which the regiment would support on D-Day. In the spring the regiment moved to Monks Common Camp at Mannings Heath in West Sussex. Then in May the units of 80th AA Bde moved to their marshalling areas to embark for the invasion.

== D-Day ==
For the Normandy landings, 80th AA Bde was assigned to support I Corps landing on Juno and Sword Beaches, while 76th AA Brigade supported XXX Corps on Gold Beach. The leading elements were to land with the assault waves on D-Day itself (6 June). Light AA defence was emphasised at the start of the operation, since low-level attack by Luftwaffe aircraft was considered the most likely threat. However, 103rd HAA Rgt was designated to land on the second tide on D-Day with minimum scales of equipment, to be brought up to strength by parties arriving later.

The leading units were formed into AA Assault Groups, and Lt-Col Johnstone with RHQ of 103rd HAA Rgt took charge of 'N' AA Assault Group landing on Queen Sector of Sword Beach under the command of 3rd British Division. The assault group included 220/73rd LAA Bty equipped with towed and self-propelled (SP) 40 mm Bofors guns and a troop of 93rd LAA Rgt equipped with the new 20 mm Polsten gun in triple mountings, half of them mounted on Crusader tank chassis. The HAA guns were to land on the second tide, with the officer commanding 323/103 HAA Bty in command of all AA units landing on this tide.

N AA Assault Group with No 6 Beach Group, 101 Beach Sub-area

- 103rd HAA Rgt RHQ (Lt-Col H.E. Johnstone)
  - D Troop 323/103 HAA Bty
  - 324/103 HAA Bty
  - 220/73 LAA Bty
  - I Troop 322/93 LAA Bty
  - C Troop 474 Independent Searchlight Battery
  - 160 AA Operations Room (AAOR)
  - One Platoon, 112 Company Pioneer Corps (smoke generators)
  - 103rd HAA Rgt Workshop, REME

Meanwhile, 322/103 HAA Bty and C Troop of 323/103 HAA Bty were assigned to the neighbouring 'M' AA Assault Group under RHQ of 73rd LAA Rgt. Among this group, B Troop of 322/103 HAA Bty would have a secondary coastal artillery role to protect shipping off Queen sector from attack by German E-boats, particularly at night. For this purpose 16 Fire Control Post and 76 and 103 Coast Observer detachments were landed with it. The guns would either fire blind, controlled by radar, or with the assistance of searchlights.

Reconnaissance parties from 103rd HAA Rgt landed on Queen sector between Ouistreham and Luc-sur-Mer during the late afternoon of D-day, but attempts to land HAA guns on the beaches during the second tide were hampered by a lack of Rhino ferries and by damaged towing gear. By nightfall, only two of 103rd HAA's guns were ashore, and these were without instruments. Nevertheless, they came into action against raids at dusk and were credited with destroying two enemy aircraft. Luckily, Luftwaffe attacks on D-Day were few and sporadic, and more HAA guns began to come ashore the following day (D+1).

Once the initial landings had been achieved, the AA Assault Groups were broken up and reorganised by regimental groups, the regimental commander becoming AA Defence Commander (AADC) for the local area:

103 HAA Rgt Gp

- All units 103rd HAA Rgt
- 160 AAOR
- 16 Fire Control Post
- 76 & 103 Coast Observation Detachments
- B & C Troops, 474 S/L Bty attached

== Normandy ==
As the build-up in the Normandy beachhead grew during June and July 1944, 80th AA Bde was tasked with protecting Juno and Sword beaches, the small port of Ouistreham, and the Orne and Caen Canal bridges.

B Troop took up its coast defence position at Ouistreham on D+2, where it came under enemy artillery fire, suffering some casualties and damage. As part of the coast defence role, Gun Control Radar sets were used to plot Parachute mines being dropped by German aircraft in the anchorage (though the AA guns were forbidden to engage them for fear of causing casualties among the shipping). Given the low intensity of air attacks, HAA guns in the bridgehead were sometimes made available to fire on ground targets for bombardment, counter-battery and anti-tank shoots. For example, on 13 June the regiment fired 100 rounds per gun on ground targets in collaboration with 4th Army Group Royal Artillery (AGRA), and C Troop carried out shoots on Caen with 53rd Medium Rgt on 22 and 23 June.

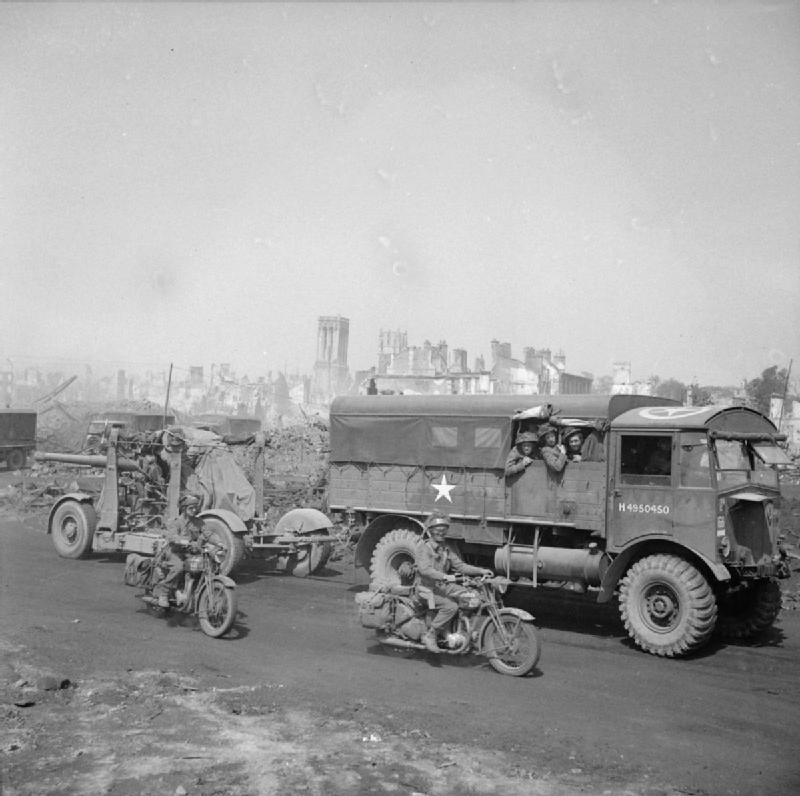
A Matador tows a 3.7-inch HAA gun through the ruins of Caen in August 1944.

July continued the same pattern: a number of AA rounds expended most nights, more fired in support of ground operations around Caen, and a trickle of casualties from occasional shellfire and bombs. From 7 to 9 July, 324 Bty fired at enemy observation posts (OPs) and other targets in the Colombelles factory area while I Corps attacked Caen (Operation Charnwood). At the beginning of August, 103rd HAA Rgt was redeployed, with one 8-gun battery east of the Orne and the remainder concentrated round the canal bridges.

Lt-Col Johnston was later awarded an OBE for his work during Operation Overlord.

== Breakout ==
21st Army Group broke out from the Normandy beachhead at the end of August and began to pursue the defeated German troops across Northern France. AA defence of the beachhead became less important and 80th AA Bde was released from its commitments there in order to follow the advance. 103rd HAA Regiment remained in the Caen–Ouistreham area under the command of the newly-arrived 75th AA Bde.

On 12 September, 103rd HAA Rgt became mobile again, with its own 44 three-tonner lorries supplemented by the 30 of 1613 Platoon, Royal Army Service Corps. The regiment rejoined 80th AA Bde at the liberated port of Dieppe, where the responsibilities included security of a large Prisoner-of-war camp, and helping to unload ships at the docks. The regiment next moved in early October to Boulogne, where it came under the command of 103rd AA Bde.

== Belgium ==
Large targets in the liberated areas such as Brussels and the port of Antwerp were vulnerable to attack by V-1 flying bombs (codenamed 'Divers'), and GHQ planned large-scale AA defence schemes for the cities, 'Antwerp X' and 'Brussels X', integrating guns and early warning radar. At the beginning of October, 80th AA Bde began to equip its HAA units with Radar No 3 Mark V (the SCR-584 radar set) and No 10 Predictors (the all-electric Bell Labs AAA Computer), and began training operators on them in preparation for tracking these small fast-moving targets. 103rd HAA Rgt received its first of these new items on 3 October at Dieppe. The first 'Diver' was launched against Brussels on 21 October. 103rd HAA Rgt arrived from Boulogne on 28 October, and reverted to the command of 80th AA Bde for training on the new radar and predictors. It then deployed to Leuven, east of Brussels, on 9 November, where it reinforced 101st AA Bde.

By mid-December, the Royal Navy had become concerned about the safety of the channel leading from Zeebrugge up the Scheldt Estuary to the vital supply base of Antwerp, and more HAA guns were sent to cover it. The number of V-1s fired at Brussels was considerably lower than at Antwerp, and it was possible to relieve some of the defending units there, so 103rd HAA Rgt (less 322 Bty), was sent from the Brussels X defences to Knokke. Here it deployed at Zeebrugge and Cadzand along with 73rd LAA Rgt and 413 Bty 54th Searchlight Rgt, coming under the operational command of 105th AA Bde (then of 75th AA Bde from January 1945) as part of the 'Scheldt South' deployment. Lieutenant-Colonel Johnston of 103rd HAA Rgt was appointed AADC Scheldt Approaches. 322 HAA Battery remained under 101st AA Bde at Jodoigne in the Brussels X belt until it rejoined the regiment in late January.

On 1 January 1945, the Luftwaffe launched Operation Bodenplatte: daylight attacks by single-engined fighters against Allied airfields in support of the Ardennes offensive; the Scheldt Approaches guns claimed to have shot down six of these. That month the regiment began to receive the machine fuze setter MFS No 11A, which increased the rate of fire of the 3.7-inch gun to 20 rounds per minute. Also at that time the regimental REME workshops were withdrawn and replaced by smaller regimental detachments from 75th AA Bde workshops.

The regiment's guns were active against night raids in late January, which were believed to cover for minelaying aircraft. The regiment began to practice radar tracking for these minelayers. In March, it lent a platoon of its AEC Matador HAA gun tractors to 21st Army Group to assist in transporting engineering stores for the assault crossing of the Rhine (Operation Plunder). As the Allied forces advanced into Germany the air threat dwindled. The last V-1 landed at Antwerp on 29 March, and the AA defences in Belgium were concentrated round the Scheldt, where 103rd HAA came under the command of 5th Royal Marine AA Bde.

== Disbandment ==
By late April 1945, a number of AA units were deemed surplus to requirements. The regiment was ordered to concentrate at Hoogerheide on 23 April and come under the command of 76th AA Bde, which was handling unit disbandments and conversions to other roles. 103rd HAA Rgt was converted into a driver training unit, for which it was joined by 64th HAA Rgt's REME workshop. The first intake of potential drivers arrived just before VE Day. The regiment passed to 50th AA Bde shortly afterwards.

The regiment continued in this role until it was disbanded on 20 November 1945. Unlike pre-war TA units which went into 'suspended animation', it was not reformed in the postwar TA.
