= 117th Heavy Anti-Aircraft Regiment, Royal Artillery =

117th Heavy Anti-Aircraft Regiment, RA 622 Infantry Regiment, RA
- Royal Artillery cap badge
- Active: 20 December 1940 – 7 June 1945
- Country: United Kingdom
- Branch: British Army
- Role: Air defence Infantry
- Size: Regiment
- Part of: Anti-Aircraft Command; Second Army
- Engagements: The Blitz; Baby Blitz; Operation Diver; North West Europe

117th Heavy Anti-Aircraft Regiment (117th HAA Rgt) was an air defence unit of Britain's Royal Artillery during World War II. It protected Sheffield during the latter part of The Blitz and also served on Merseyside and in Orkney, where it protected the vital naval base of Scapa Flow. Later it defended London during the 'Baby Blitz' and against the V-1 flying bomb offensive (Operation Diver). Towards the end of the war the regiment was converted into infantry for occupation duties in Continental Europe. It was disbanded at the end of the war.

== Organisation ==
117th Heavy AA Regiment was raised as part of the rapid expansion of Anti-Aircraft Command in late 1940. Regimental Headquarters (RHQ) was formed on 20 December 1940 at No 5 AA Practice Camp at Weybourne, Norfolk, to take command of 369, 370 and 371 HAA Batteries, which had been raised on 15 October 1940. Major R.A. Sparks, second-in-command of 99th (London Welsh) HAA Rgt, was promoted to Lieutenant-Colonel as commanding officer (CO) of the new regiment on 8 January 1941.

RHQ was established at the Drill Hall in Mexborough on 10 January and the batteries took over gunsites in the Sheffield and Humber Gun Defence Areas (GDAs):

- 369 Bty manning Sheffield G and Y sites, with Battery HQ (BHQ) at Y
- 370 Bty HQ and three sections at Sheffield L site; one section detached to the Drill Hall at Barnsley
- 371 Bty accommodated with their equipment at Scunthorpe E and F sites, with BHQ at F

On 23 January 1941 392 HAA Bty also joined the regiment. This had been formed on 4 November 1940 by 211th AA Training Rgt at Oswestry from a cadre of experienced officers and men provided by 93rd HAA Rgt.

The regiment came under the command of 39th AA Brigade in 10th AA Division. However, 39th AA Bde was in the process of handing the Sheffield GDA over to a newly formed 62nd AA Bde, which was to assume responsibility for defending the industrial areas of Sheffield and Leeds against raids by the German Luftwaffe. The handover occurred on 8 February, but 371 Bty temporarily remained at Scunthorpe in the Humber GDA under 39th AA Bde.

== Blitz ==
10th AA Division's formation sign.

39th AA Brigade's operation order for 117th HAA Rgt's arrival commented that 'These batteries have had little training and have never practised unseen methods of fire', and arranged that the outgoing batteries of 91st HAA Rgt would temporarily leave experienced gun position officers (GPOs) and their assistants at the sites, together with gun No 1s, to train 117th's men. Sheffield had been badly blitzed for four nights in December, Humberside was regularly attacked, and raiders were overhead on most nights on their way to various targets in Northern England. There were further notable attacks on Sheffield on 14 March and 8 May before the Blitz ended on 16 May.

371 HAA Battery rejoined the regiment at Sheffield on 20 February and RHQ remained with 62nd AA Bde through the summer of 1941. However, 392 Bty was frequently detached, to 39th AA Bde in February, and for a period in June to 33rd (Western) AA Bde defending Liverpool and West Lancashire under 4th AA Division.

== Mid-War ==
OSDEF's formation sign.

The whole of 117th HAA Rgt moved to Merseyside and joined 33rd AA Bde in the autumn. (Note: One source suggests that the regiment transferred to 70th AA Bde in 4th AA Division from December to May 1942, but this appears to be an error for 107th HAA Rgt.) On 17 May 1942, 358 HAA Bty joined the regiment from 147th HAA Rgt; it returned to 147th on 10 July, but was then regimented with 117th permanently from 27 October. 371 HAA Battery was temporarily attached to 44th AA Bde at Manchester in June.

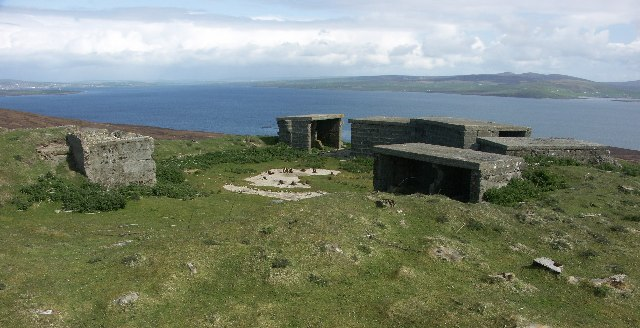
Remains of a World War II HAA gunsite at Lyrawa Hill, Orkney.

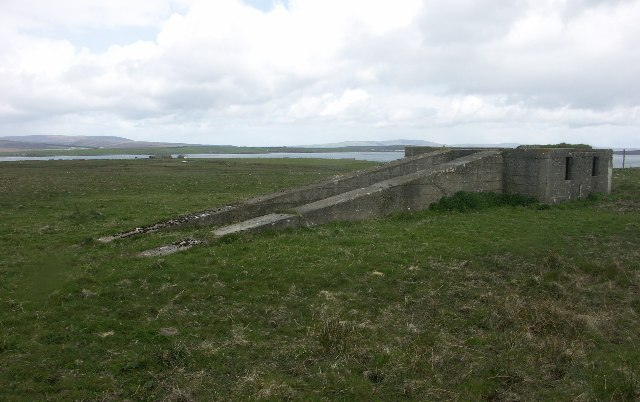
Remains of the radar platform of the World War II HAA gunsite at South Walls, Orkney.

In August 369 and 392 HAA Btys were detached (though 369 returned almost immediately) and the regiment was sent to the Orkney and Shetland Defences (OSDEF), where it was stationed on Orkney under 58th AA Bde to protect the vital naval base of Scapa Flow. It commanded 369, 370 and 371 HAA Btys and had 372 HAA Bty attached to it from 119th HAA Rgt on Shetland until October. 392 HAA Battery rejoined the regiment in December and 358 in January, giving the regiment a total of five batteries (the whole of the HAA defences deployed on Orkney).

By the time 117th HAA Rgt left OSDEF in October 1943, AA Command on the United Kingdom mainland had been reorganised, the corps and divisions being replaced by groups aligned with the groups of Royal Air Force (RAF) Fighter Command. The regiment joined 48th AA Bde in 1 AA Group, covering the London Inner Artillery Zone (IAZ).

== Baby Blitz ==
In January 1944 the Luftwaffe resumed night raids on London, which became known as the 'Baby Blitz'. These raids employed new faster bombers with sophisticated 'pathfinder' techniques and radar jamming. For example, on the night of 21 January 200 hostile aircraft were plotted approaching the South Coast in two waves, which intermingled with returning aircraft of RAF Bomber Command. This caused problems of identification and restrictions on fire, but the guns of 2 AA Gp in South-East England and then 1 AA Gp engaged as the raiders approached London. Only one-fifth of the raiders reached the city, the remainder turning away to bomb open country. AA guns brought down eight aircraft and RAF Night fighters also had successes. At the end of January London Docks received a 130-strong raid dropping flares and incendiaries as they had in the London Blitz of 1940–41: about one-third reached their target and five were shot down. February began with a 75-strong raid, of which only 12 reached the IAZ and four were shot down. On 13 February only six out of 115 bombers reached London. The climax came with five raids in the week 18–25 February varying from 100 to 140 in strength. These met intense AA fire from the Thames Estuary onwards and fewer than half made it to central London: the AA score was 13 shot down while the night fighters added 15, with another shared. Facing these casualty rates, the Luftwaffe switched to targets away from London until 24 March, when a 100-strong raid on London lost four aircraft, and finally on 18 April a raid of 125 aircraft lost 14 shot down and only 30 reached the IAZ. Although much damage was caused in London, the rising efficiency of the HAA guns and radar made the enemy's losses unsustainable.

The Baby Blitz notwithstanding, the threat from air attacks on the UK had diminished by early 1944 and AA Command was required to release manpower to the field armies, particularly for the forthcoming Allied invasion of Normandy (Operation Overlord). A number of AA units in Air Defence of Great Britain lost one of their batteries, including 117th HAA Rgt. 392 HAA Battery left on 17 February 1944 for disbandment, which was completed by 16 March.

== Operation Diver ==
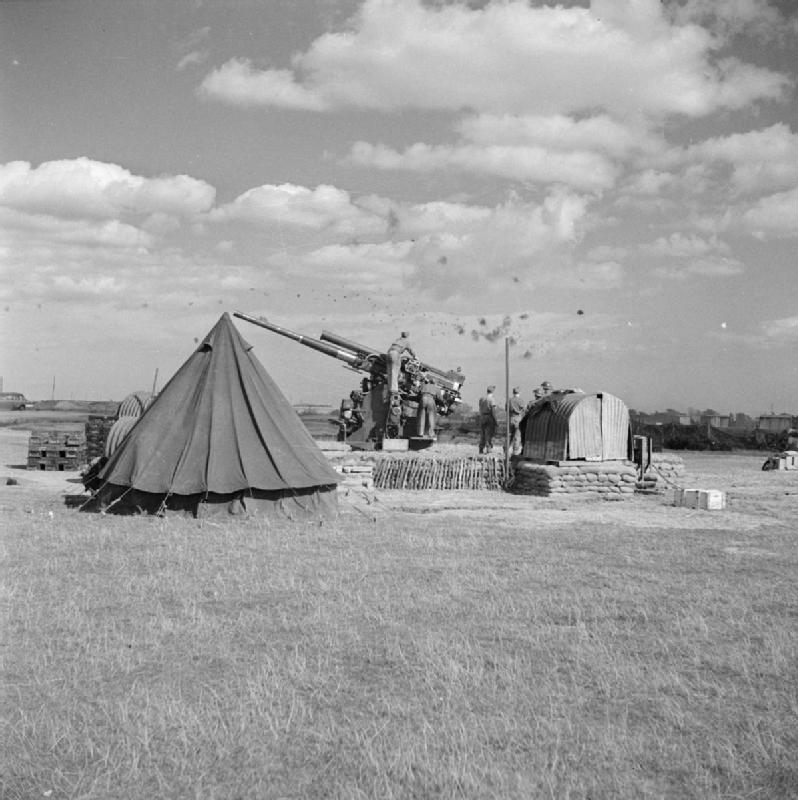
3.7-inch HAA gun in action near London, 29 August 1944 (note AA shell bursts in the distance).

AA Command was preparing for the anticipated arrival of V-1 flying bombs, codenamed 'Divers'. In the event, the first of these did not arrive over England until a week after 'Overlord' began with the D Day landings, and AA units quickly deployed for Operation Diver. However, early results of AA fire by 1 and 2 AA Groups against the small, fast, low-flying missiles were disappointing. Even shooting down those that reached the IAZ caused significant damage, so a ban was imposed on fire in this area. At the end of June the commander-in-chief of AA Command, Lt-Gen Sir Frederick 'Tim' Pile, ordered a change in tactics: many of the HAA guns were redeployed in Diver Belts close to the South Coast, giving the guns a free fire zone out to sea. On 16 July 1 AA Group was ordered to form a 'Diver Box' of gun defences across the Thames Estuary, forward of a line from Chelmsford in Essex to Chatham, Kent. The removal of so many guns, and the silencing of those remaining in the IAZ, led Londoners to believe that the city was being defended by the RAF alone.

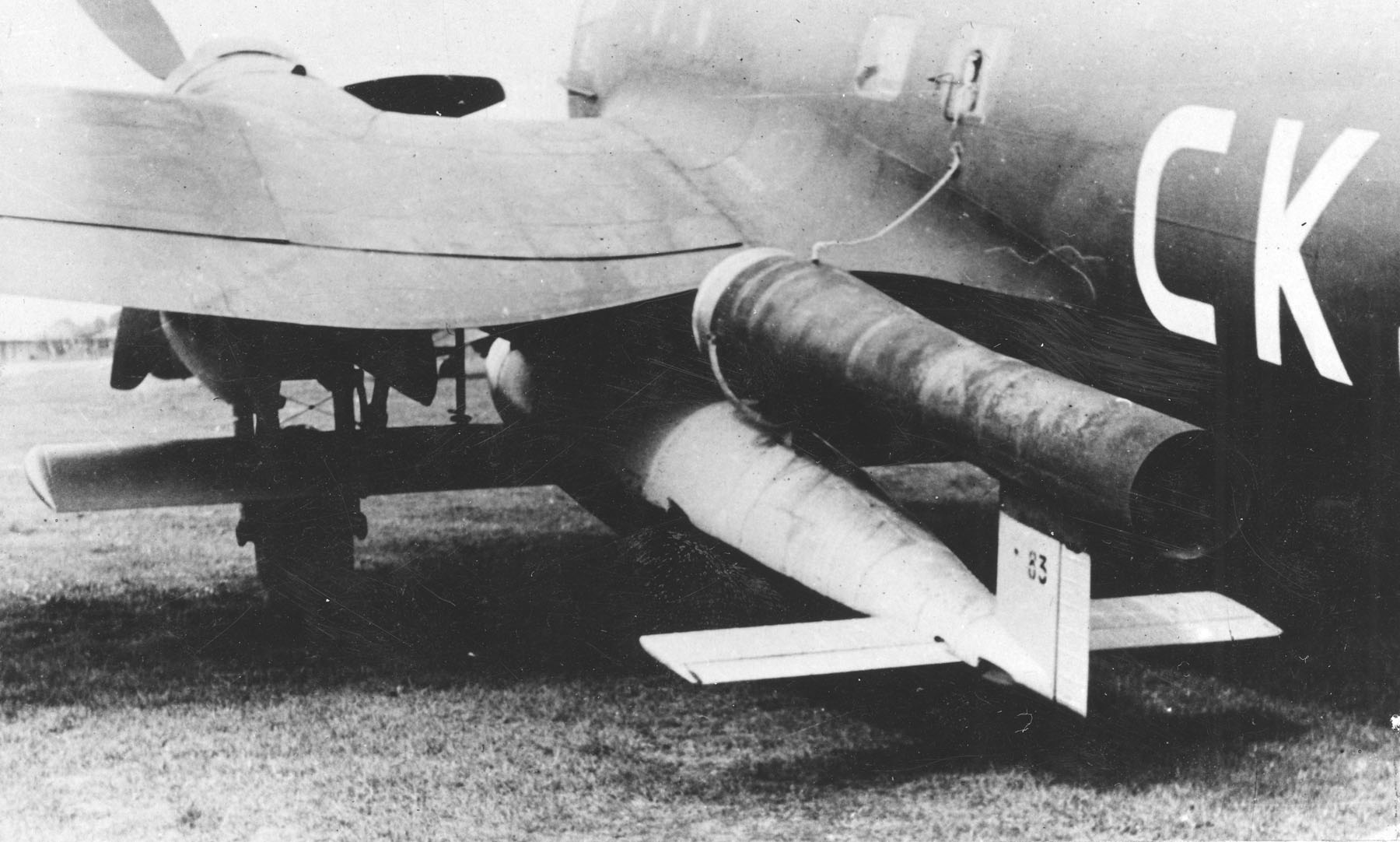
A Heinkel He 111 H-22 carrying a V-1 flying bomb.

As 21st Army Group began to overrun the V-1 launching sites in Northern France, the Luftwaffe turned to launching the missiles from aircraft over the North Sea, and 1 AA Group's Diver Box was heavily engaged. It was largely equipped with Mark IIC 3.7-inch HAA guns with No 10 Predictors and SCR-584 radar, and began using the proximity VT fuze with great success.

Success rates for AA Command began to rise during this second Diver deployment: from 9 per cent in July, the average rose to over 50 per cent. On one day 68 missiles were destroyed out of 96 plotted. The weekly total of missiles reaching London fell from a peak of 362 in July to 100, then down to 10 in September. Redeployments and changes in command were continuous. 3 AA Group HQ was brought from Bristol to take over command of the London IAZ, leaving 1 AA Group to concentrate on the Diver Box and the Thames/Medway and Dover defences. By 16 October 1944 117th HAA Rgt was with 69th AA Bde under 3 AA Gp, moving back to 57th AA Bde in 1 AA Gp a month later.

== 622 Infantry Regiment, RA ==
At the end of 1944, the Luftwaffe was suffering from such shortages of pilots, aircraft and fuel that serious air attacks on the UK could be discounted and the War Office began reorganising surplus AA regiments in the UK into infantry battalions for duties in the rear areas. Meanwhile 21st Army Group fighting in North West Europe was suffering a severe manpower shortage, particularly among the infantry. In January 1945, the War Office accelerated the conversion of surplus artillery into infantry units, primarily for line of communication and occupation duties, thereby releasing trained infantry for frontline service.

On 23 January 1945, 117th HAA Rgt was converted into 622 Infantry Rgt, RA, with 358, 369, 370 and 371 HAA Btys reorganised into five batteries designated A to E. Four days later it joined 305th Infantry Brigade (recently converted from 49th AA Bde).

After infantry training, including a short period attached to the 55th (West Lancashire) Infantry Division, 305th Brigade came under the orders of 21st Army Group on 18 April 1945, and landed on the Continent two days later. It did duty with Second Army.

622 Infantry Regiment was disbanded on 7 June 1945.
