= 4th Anti-Aircraft Division (United Kingdom) =

- Formation sign of the 4th Anti-Aircraft division.
- Active: 1 September 1938–30 September 1942
- Country: United Kingdom
- Branch: Territorial Army
- Type: Anti-Aircraft Division
- Role: Air Defence
- Size: 2–5 Brigades
- Part of: Western Command (1938–39); Anti-Aircraft Command (1939–40); 2 AA Corps (1940–42)
- Garrison/HQ: Chester; Liverpool
- Engagements: The Blitz

The 4th Anti-Aircraft Division (4th AA Division) was an air defence formation of Britain's Territorial Army, created in the period of tension before the outbreak of the Second World War. It defended North West England during the Blitz.

== Origin ==
Increasing concern during the 1930s about the threat of air attack led to large numbers of units of the part-time Territorial Army (TA) being converted to anti-aircraft (AA) gun and searchlight roles in the Royal Artillery (RA) and Royal Engineers (RE), and higher formations became necessary to control them. One such formation was the 4th AA Division, raised on 1 September 1938 in Western Command, with its headquarters at Chester. The first General Officer Commanding (GOC) was Maj-Gen Hugh Martin.

The AA Divisions were unlike field formations: they were established to organise training and later exercise operational command in the static conditions of home defence, but relied entirely on the Home Forces commands for logistic support, supplies, and heavy repairs. They came under the operational control of RAF Fighter Command.

The 4th AA Division was initially responsible for the industrial areas of the North West and West Midlands of England and North and South Wales. At first it consisted of two brigades: the existing Liverpool-based 33rd (Western) AA Brigade transferred from the 2nd AA Division and the newly formed 34th (South Midland) AA Brigade based at Coventry. Shortly afterwards, 44th AA Brigade was formed at Manchester. The division came under the control of Anti-Aircraft Command when that was formed in April 1939.

== Mobilisation ==
The deterioration in international relations led to a partial mobilisation in June 1939, and a proportion of TA AA units manned their war stations under a rotation system known as 'Couverture'. Full mobilisation of AA Command came in August 1939, ahead of the declaration of war on 3 September 1939. Two new brigades, 53rd (Light) AA Brigade composed of Light AA (LAA) units, and 54th, composed of searchlight units, were in the process of formation in the 4th AA Division as mobilisation proceeded.

=== Order of Battle ===
On mobilisation in August 1939, the division was composed as follows:

- 33rd (Western) Anti-Aircraft Brigade – HQ at Liverpool
  - 70th (3rd West Lancashire) AA Regiment, RA – Heavy Anti-Aircraft (HAA) unit formed in 1937 at Aigburth, Liverpool, by conversion of 89th (3rd West Lancashire) Field Brigade, RA
  - 81st AA Regiment, RA – HAA unit formed in 1936 at Stalybridge and Stockport by conversion of the 60th (Cheshire & Shropshire) Medium Brigade, RA
  - 93rd AA Regiment, RA – new HAA unit raised in 1939 in Birkenhead and Chester
  - 38th (The King's Regiment) AA Battalion, RE – Searchlight unit formed in 1936 at Liverpool by conversion of the 6th (Rifles) Battalion King's Regiment (Liverpool)
  - 4th Battalion, The Loyal Regiment (North Lancashire) (62nd Searchlight Regiment) – infantry battalion based at Preston converted into a searchlight unit in 1938
  - 33rd AA Brigade Company Royal Army Service Corps
- 34th (South Midland) Anti-Aircraft Brigade – HQ at Coventry
  - 69th (Royal Warwickshire Regiment) AA Regiment, RA – HAA unit formed at Birmingham in 1936 by conversion of the 6th Battalion, Royal Warwickshire Regiment
  - 73rd AA Regiment, RA – HAA unit raised at Wolverhampton and West Bromwich in 1938 from batteries drawn from the 62nd (North Midland) Field and 51st (Midland) Medium Brigades, RA
  - 95th (Birmingham) AA Regiment, RA – newly raised in April 1939, with one battery from the 73rd AA Regiment
  - 34th AA Brigade Company, RASC
- 44th Anti-Aircraft Brigade – HQ at Manchester
  - 65th (The Manchester Regiment) AA Regiment, RA – HAA unit formed at Hulme in 1936 by conversion of the 6th/7th Battalion. Manchester Regiment
  - 39th (The Lancashire Fusiliers) AA Battalion, RE – Searchlight unit formed at Salford in 1936 by conversion of the 7th Battalion Lancashire Fusiliers
  - 71st (East Lancashire) Searchlight Regiment, RA – new searchlight unit raised in Manchester in 1938
  - 44th AA Brigade Company, RASC
- 53rd Light Anti-Aircraft Brigade – Forming at Chester
  - 15th (Isle of Man) LAA Regiment, RA – at Douglas, Isle of Man
  - 21st LAA Regiment, RA – at Liverpool
  - 25th LAA Regiment, RA – at Liverpool
  - 33rd LAA Regiment, RA – at Liverpool
  - 53rd AA Brigade Company, RASC
- 54th Anti-Aircraft Brigade – forming at Sutton Coldfield
  - 41st (5th North Staffordshire Regiment) AA Battalion, RE – infantry battalion at Stoke-on-Trent converted to searchlights in 1936
  - 45th (The Royal Warwickshire Regiment) AA Battalion, RE – infantry battalion at Birmingham converted to searchlights in 1936
  - 59th (Warwickshire) Searchlight Regiment, RA – new unit formed from a battery of the 45th AA Bn in 1938
  - 61st (South Lancashire Regiment) Searchlight Regiment, RA – infantry battalion at St Helens converted to searchlights in 1938
  - 54th AA Brigade Company, RASC
- 4th AA Divisional Signals, Royal Corps of Signals – formed at liverpool, later at Chester, from a cadre provided by the 55th (West Lancashire) Divisional Signals
- 4th AA Divisional Royal Army Service Corps – at Chester
  - 182nd and 913th Companies
- 4th AA Divisional Company, Royal Army Medical Corps – at Manchester
- 4th AA Divisional Workshop, Royal Army Ordnance Corps – RAOC Workshop companies became part of the new Royal Electrical and Mechanical Engineers (REME) during 1942

=== Deployment ===
At this point the division had a strength of 92 HAA guns (3-inch, 3.7-inch and 4.5-inch) while in the LAA role there were 26 3-inch, 13 2-pounder 'pom-pom' and 40 mm Bofors guns, and 469 light machine guns (LMGs), together with 244 searchlights. The HAA guns were deployed in the defended areas as follows:

- Liverpool – 19 (plus 3 out of action)
- Manchester – 12 (plus 10 out of action)
- Birmingham – 20 (plus 4 out of action)
- Coventry –12
- Cardiff – 6 (plus 2 out of action)
- Newport – 4

== Phoney War ==
During the period of the Phoney War, the AA defences of NW England were not tested in action, and the time was spent in equipping and training the TA units. AA Command also had to provide equipment and units to the British Expeditionary Force assembling in France. From the 4th AA Division, the 73rd AA Regiment went to France in November 1939 where it joined the 12th Anti-Aircraft Brigade providing AA cover for the airfields of the RAF's Advanced Air Striking Force. In January 1940, Maj-Gen Martin went to command the AA defences of the BEF. He was replaced by Maj-Gen Charles Cadell, recently returned from commanding the AA defences of Malaya.

== Battle of Britain ==
In the summer of 1940, all AA units equipped with 3-inch or heavier guns were designated as Heavy AA (HAA) regiments to distinguish them from the newer LAA units. Also, in August the AA battalions were transferred from the RE to the RA, which designated them searchlight regiments.

=== Deployment ===
At the start of the Battle of Britain, in July 1940, the 4th AA Division's guns were deployed as follows:

- Liverpool – 52
- Manchester – 20
- Crewe – 8
- Birmingham – 64
- Coventry – 44
- RAF Ringway – 4
- Vital Points – 52 (mainly LAA)

== Reorganisation ==
In September 1940, the 4th AA Division formed the 4th AA Z Regiment to command the new short-range rocket weapons known as Z Batteries. Also in September 1940, RAF Fighter Command created a new HQ (No. 9 Group RAF) to cover NW England, and henceforth the 4th AA Division cooperated with it.

As the Battle of Britain fought over southern England in the summer of 1940 developed into the night bombing of the Blitz in the autumn, AA Command continued to expand. In November a new division was formed by splitting the 34th and 54th AA Brigades off from the 4th AA Division to create the 11th AA Division, which took over responsibility for the West Midlands, while the 9th AA Division took over South Wales. At the same time, the 4th AA Division came under the control of a newly formed II AA Corps.

== The Blitz ==
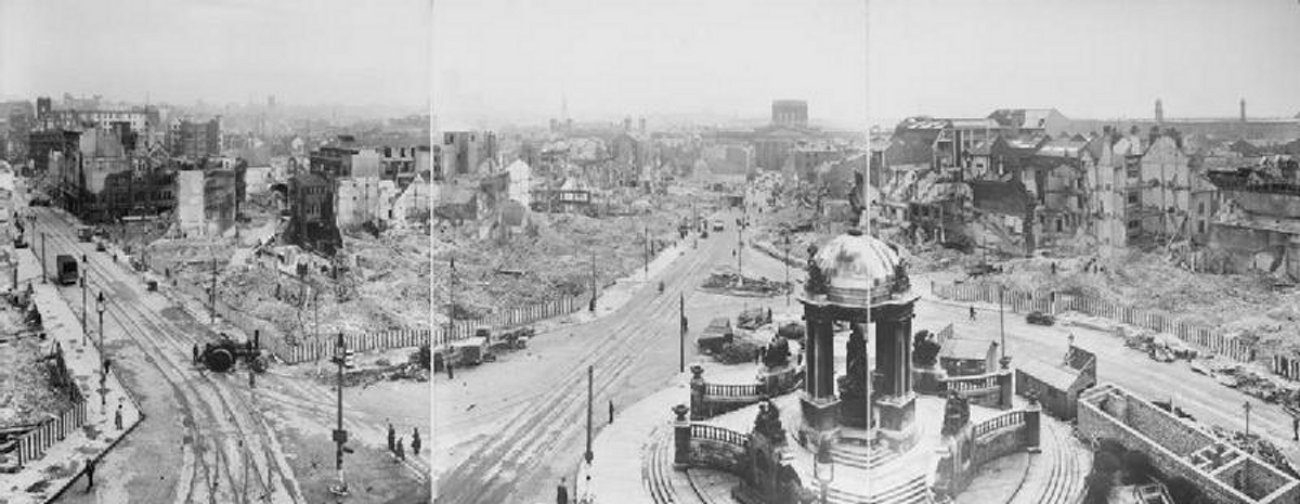
A panoramic view of bomb damage in Liverpool; Victoria Monument in foreground, the burned-out shell of the Custom House in middle distance

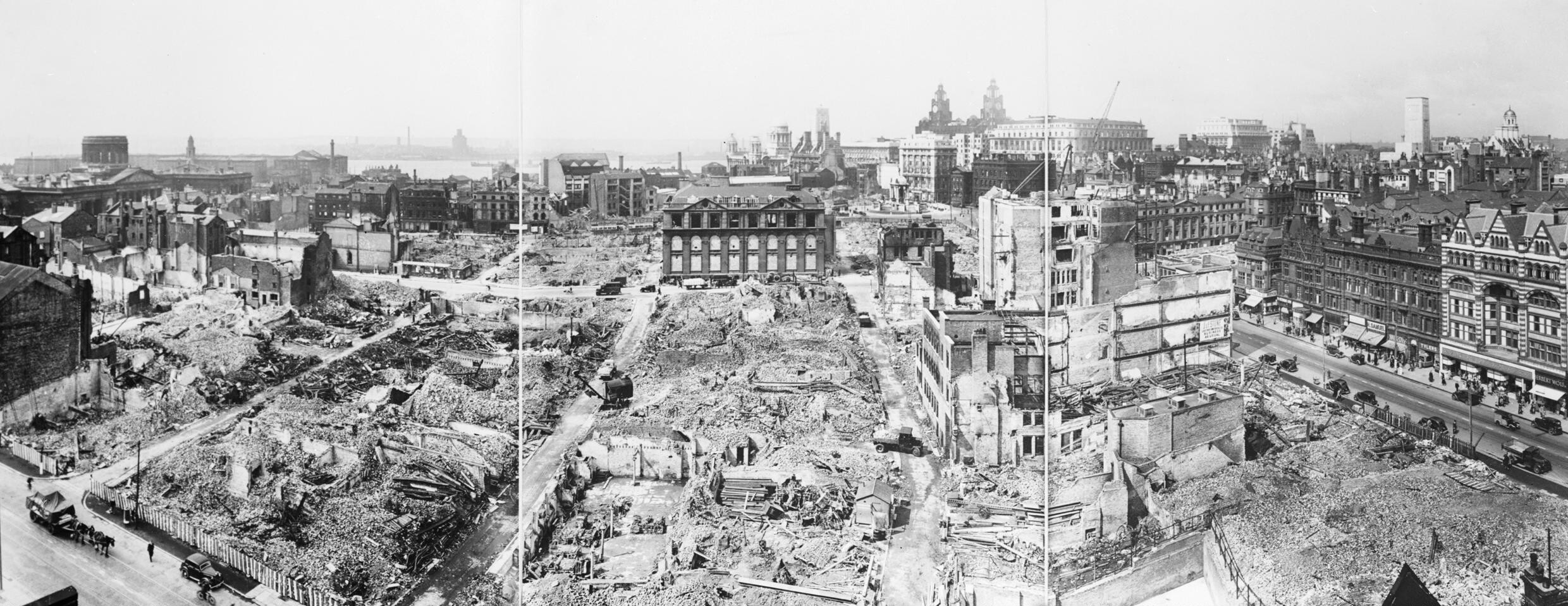
Another panoramic view, looking towards the River Mersey

The cities of NW England were heavily bombed during the winter of 1940–41 (the Liverpool Blitz and Manchester Blitz) and 'the actions fought [by the AA batteries] were as violent, dangerous and prolonged as any in the field'. 'On an HAA 4.5-inch position of 44th AA Brigade in Manchester, the power rammer on one gun failed. One Gunner loaded 127 of the 86-lb [40 kg] rounds himself in eleven hours of action, despite injuries to his fingers'.

The wide Mersey Estuary left a gap in the Liverpool defences that could not be fully covered by AA guns, and by mid-1941 AA Command had begun constructing three Maunsell Forts in the estuary on which to mount AA guns.

=== Order of Battle ===
During the winter of 1940–41, the division was composed as follows:

- 33rd AA Brigade – Liverpool
  - 103rd HAA Regiment, RA – formed May 1940
  - 106th HAA Regiment, RA – formed August 1940
  - 33rd LAA Regiment, RA – as above
  - 42nd LAA Regiment, RA – formed November 1939
  - 65th LAA Regiment, RA (part) – formed November 1940

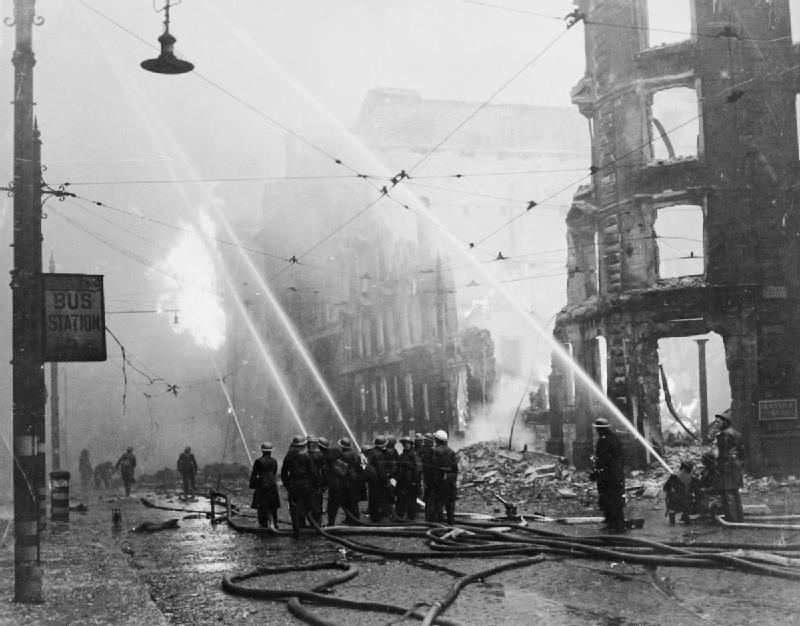
Firefighters putting out a blaze at a bomb site in Manchester city centre

- 44th AA Brigade – Manchester
  - 98th HAA Regiment, RA – formed 1939
  - 115th HAA Regiment, RA – formed November 1940
  - 54th (Argyll & Sutherland Highlanders) LAA Regiment, RA – formed 1938 by conversion of 9th (Dumbartonshire) Bn, Argyll and Sutherland Highlanders
  - 76th LAA Regiment, RA – formed February 1941
- 53rd AA Brigade – North Midlands
  - 39th (Lancashire Fusiliers) S/L Regiment, RA – as above
  - 62nd (The Loyals) S/L Regiment, RA – as above
  - 71st (East Lancashire) S/L Regiment, RA – as above
  - 92nd S/L Regiment, RA – formed May 1941
- 4th AA Z Regiment, RA – as above
- 13th AA Z Regiment, RA – 'formed August 1941

The night raids continued into the following Spring, during which period Liverpool and its docks along the Mersey became the most heavily bombed area of Britain outside London, with particularly heavy attacks in December 1940 (the Christmas Blitz); in April 1941; and again the following month (the May Blitz).

== Mid-War ==
The main Blitz ended in May 1941, but occasional raids continued on Manchester and Liverpool. Newly formed AA units joined the division, the HAA units increasingly being 'mixed' ones into which women of the Auxiliary Territorial Service were integrated. At the same time, experienced units were posted away for service overseas. This led to a continual turnover of units, which accelerated in 1942 with the preparations for Operation Torch and the need to transfer AA units from North West England to counter the Baedeker Blitz and the Luftwaffe's hit-and-run attacks against South Coast towns.

=== Order of Battle 1941–42 ===
During this period the division was composed as follows:

- 33rd AA Brigade
  - 1st HAA Rgt – Regular regiment, transferred from 1st AA Brigade at Crewe; to Northern Ireland July 1941
  - 93rd HAA Rgt – as above; to the 44th AA Brigade July 1942
  - 95th HAA Rgt – joined September 1942
  - 103rd HAA Rgt – as above; left for mobile training May 1942
  - 107th HAA Rgt – new unit formed Autumn 1940, partly from the 103rd HAA Rgt; left April 1942
  - 117th HAA Rgt – joined autumn, to the 70th AA Brigade December 1941, returned May, left August 1942
  - 137th (Mixed) HAA Rgt – new unit formed November, joined December 1941, left September 1942
  - 149th (Mixed) HAA Rgt – new unit formed February, joined April 1942
  - 154th (Mixed) HAA Rgt – new unit formed March, joined May 1942
  - 29th LAA Rgt – joined autumn 1941, left February 1942
  - 33rd LAA Rgt – as above; left autumn 1941
  - 63rd LAA Rgt – from the 70th AA Brigade August 1942
  - 98th LAA Rgt – new unit formed December 1941, joined February, left May 1942
  - 134th LAA Rgt – new unit formed February, joined June, left August 1942
  - 4th AA 'Z' Rgt – as above; to the 70th AA Brigade summer, rejoined autumn 1941, left August 1942
- 44 AA Brigade
  - 58th (Kent) HAA Rgt – joined February, left to join First Army for Operation Torch May 1942
  - 70th HAA Rgt – as above; left for India February 1942
  - 81st HAA Rgt – as above; rejoined from Orkney and Shetland Defences (OSDEF), June 1941; to the 70th AA Brigade summer 1941'
  - 93rd HAA Rgt – as above; from the 30th AA Brigade July, left for Middle East August 1942
  - 98th HAA Rgt – as above; left May 1942
  - 115th HAA Rgt – as above; to OSDEF June 1941
  - 151st (Mixed) HAA Rgt – new unit formed February, joined May, left July 1942
  - 21st LAA Rgt – as above; left autumn 1941
  - 39th LAA Rgt – joined summer; to the 53rd AA Brigade autumn; rejoined December 1941; to the 53rd AA Brigade July 1942
  - 65th LAA Rgt – as above; left summer 1941
  - 76th LAA Rgt – as above: to the 70th AA Brigade summer 1941
  - 80th LAA Rgt – joined autumn 1941
  - 88th LAA Rgt – joined May 1942
  - 13th AA 'Z' Rgt – joined autumn 1941
- 53rd AA Brigade
  - 39th LAA Rgt – as above; from the 44th AA Brigade autumn 1941 and again July 1942; left August 1942
  - 39th S/L Rgt – as above; rejoined from OSDEF May 1941
  - 62nd S/L Rgt – as above
  - 71st S/L Rgt – as above; to OSDEF May 1941, returned January 1941
  - 87th S/L Rgt – new unit formed January 1941; left May 1942
  - 92 S/L Rgt – as above; to the 70th AA Brigade summer 1941
- 70th AA Brigade – new formation created June 1941
  - 62nd (Northumbrian) HAA Rgt – joined April, left for Operation Torch July 1942
  - 81st HAA Rgt – as above; left for Middle East April 1942
  - 117th HAA Rgt – as above; from the 33rd AA Brigade December 1941, returned May 1942
  - 131st HAA Rgt – joined August 1942
  - 63rd LAA Rgt – joined July, to the 33rd AA Brigade August 1942
  - 76th LAA Rgt – as above; left for Ceylon February 1942
  - 114th LAA Rgt – converted from the 91st S/L Rgt January 1942; left for mobile training June 1942
  - 92nd S/L Rgt – as above
  - 4th AA 'Z' Rgt – as above; from the 33nd AA Brigade summer, returned autumn 1941

The increased sophistication of Operations Rooms and communications was reflected in the growth in signal units, which attained the following organisation by May 1942:

- 4th AA Division Mixed Signal Unit HQ, RCS
  - HQ No 1 Company
    - 4th AA Division Mixed Signal Office Section
    - 321st AA Gun Operations Room Mixed Signal Section
    - 323rd AA Gun Operations Room Mixed Signal Section
    - 325th AA Gun Operations Room Mixed Signal Section
    - 70th AA Brigade Signal Office Mixed Sub-Section
    - 10th AA Line Maintenance Section
  - HQ No 2 Company
    - 406th AA Gun Operations Room Mixed Signal Section
    - 18th AA Sub-Gun Operations Room Mixed Signal Sub-Section
    - 19th AA Sub-Gun Operations Room Mixed Signal Sub-Section
    - 20th AA Sub-Gun Operations Room Mixed Signal Sub-Section
    - 21st AA Sub-Gun Operations Room Mixed Signal Sub-Section
    - 33rd AA Brigade Signal Office Mixed Sub-Section
    - 330th AA Gun Operations Room Mixed Signal Section
    - 44th AA Brigade Signal Office Mixed Sub-Section
    - 53rd AA Brigade Signal Office Mixed Sub-Section
    - 117th RAF Fighter Sector Sub-Section
    - 11th AA Line Maintenance Section
    - 12th AA Line Maintenance Section
    - 34th AA Sub-Gun Operations Room Mixed Signal Sub-Section
- 4th AA Div Radio Maintenance Company, RAOC (later REME)

== Disbandment ==
At the end of September 1942, AA Command disbanded the AA Corps and Divisions and replaced them with new AA Groups, whose areas of responsibility coincided with the Groups of RAF Fighter Command. The responsibilities of 4th AA Division (by then headquartered in Liverpool) were taken over by the 4th AA Group, with its HQ at Preston, which covered NW England and N Wales and operated with No. 9 Group RAF. 4th AA Divisional Signals became 4th AA Group Signals on 21 October 1942 The 4th AA Group in turn was disbanded in November 1944.

== General Officer Commanding ==
The following officers commanded the 4th AA Division:

- Major-General Hugh Martin (1 September 1939 – 9 January 1940)
- Major-General Robert Pargiter (10 January–27 May 1940)
- Major-General Charles Cadell (28 May–13 February 1942)
- Major-General Osmund Frith (14 February–30 September 1942)
