= 33rd (Western) Anti-Aircraft Brigade =

33rd (Western) Anti-Aircraft Brigade 59 Anti-Aircraft Brigade
- Active: 1 November 1936 – 31 October 1955
- Country: United Kingdom
- Branch: Territorial Army
- Type: Anti-Aircraft Brigade
- Role: Air Defence
- Part of: 2nd AA Division; 4th AA Division; 4 AA Group
- Garrison/HQ: Chester; Liverpool; Warrington
- Engagements: The Blitz

The 33rd (Western) Anti-Aircraft Brigade was an air defence formation of Anti-Aircraft Command of the Territorial Army, part of the British Army, formed shortly before the outbreak of the Second World War. It defended Merseyside and West Lancashire during The Blitz.

== Origin ==
The 33rd (Western) Anti-Aircraft Group (later Brigade) was formed on 1 November 1936 at the Drill Hall, Chester, as part of 2nd AA Division, with the following AA units of the Royal Artillery (RA) and Royal Engineers (RE) under command:

- 65th (The Manchester Regiment) Anti-Aircraft Brigade RA (TA) – Heavy Anti-Aircraft (HAA) unit formed at Hulme in 1936 by conversion of 6th/7th Battalion Manchester Regiment
  - 181, 182, 183, 196 AA Batteries
- 38th (The King's Regiment) Anti-Aircraft Battalion, RE (TA) – Searchlight (S/L) unit formed at Liverpool in 1936 by conversion of 6th (Rifles) Battalion, King's Regiment (Liverpool)
  - 350, 351, 352, 353 AA Companies
- 39th (The Lancashire Fusiliers) Anti-Aircraft Battalion, RE (TA) – S/L unit formed at Salford in 1936 by conversion of 7th Battalion, Lancashire Fusiliers
  - 354, 355, 356, 357 AA Companies
- 41st (The North Staffordshire Regiment) Anti-Aircraft Battalion, RE (TA) – S/L unit formed at Stoke-on-Trent in 1936 by conversion of 5th Battalion, North Staffordshire Regiment
  - 362, 363, 364, 365 AA Companies
- 62nd (4th Bn The Loyal (North Lancashire) Regiment) Searchlight Regiment – S/L unit formed at Preston in 1938 by conversion of 4th Battalion, Loyal Regiment (North Lancashire)
  - 435, 436, 437, S/L Batteries

The 33rd AA Brigade was reassigned to 4th AA Division when that formation was created in Western Command on 1 September 1938. AA Command took over all TA air defences in 1939. From its formation, 33 AA Bde was commanded by Brigadier R.S. Ellis. By early 1939 its headquarters was at 'Crossacres', Woolton, Liverpool.

== Second World War ==
=== Mobilisation ===
AA Command mobilised in August 1939, and its units were already at their war stations on the outbreak of war on 3 September 1939. 33rd AA Brigade was responsible for the air defence of Liverpool and West Lancashire, controlling the following units:

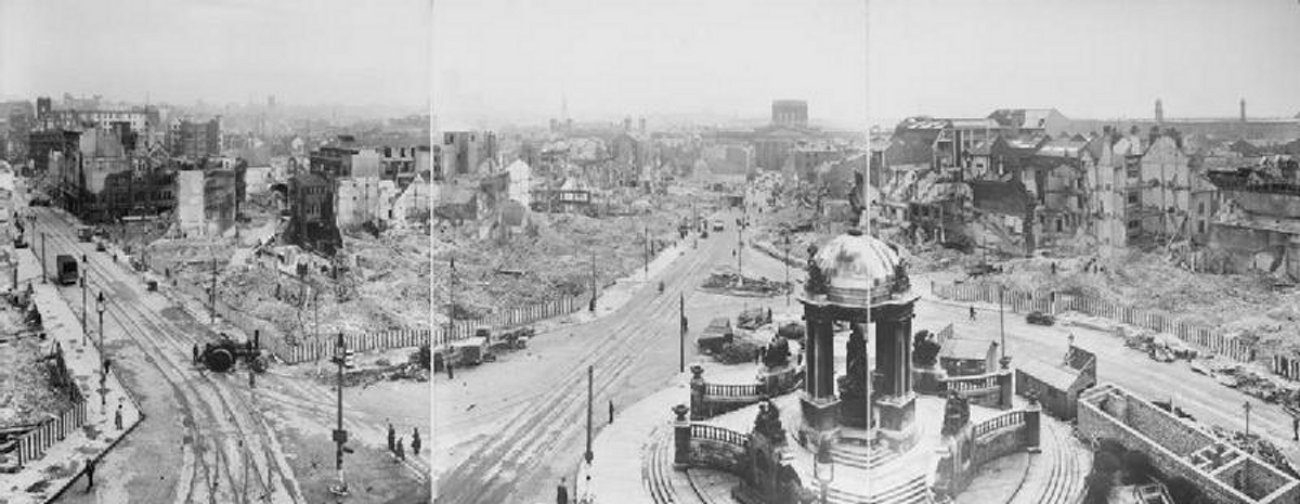
A panoramic view of bomb damage in Liverpool; Victoria Monument in foreground, the burned-out shell of the Custom House in middle distance

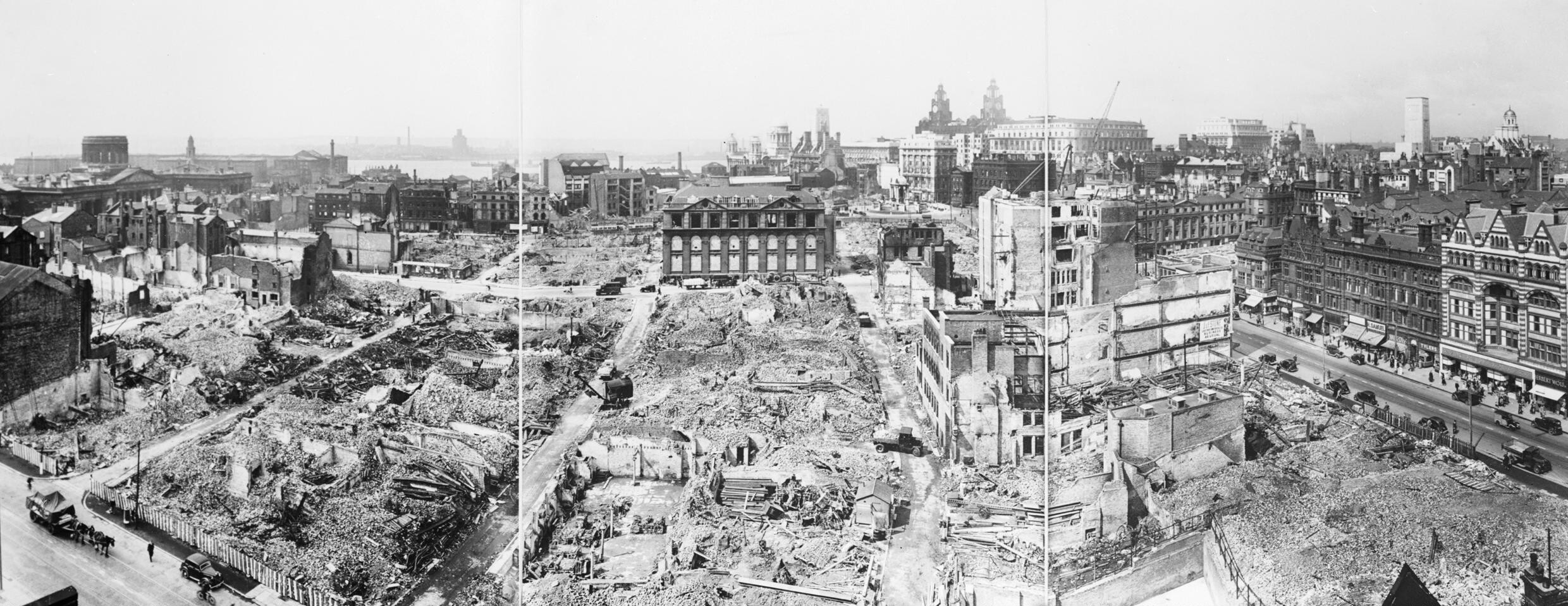
Another panoramic view, looking towards the River Mersey

- 70th (3rd West Lancashire) AA Regiment, RA – HAA unit formed in 1937 by conversion of 89th (3rd West Lancashire) Field Brigade, RA
  - HQ at Tramway Road, Aigburth, Liverpool
  - 211 (13th West Lancashire) AA Battery at Aigburth
  - 212 (27th West Lancashire) AA Battery at Aigburth
  - 216 (14th West Lancashire) AA Battery at Widnes
  - 309 AA Battery at Bootle, Liverpool
- 81st AA Regiment, RA – HAA unit formed in 1938 by conversion of 60th (6th Cheshire & Shropshire) Medium Brigade, RA
  - HQ, 253, 254 (Cheshire) AA Batteries at Stockport
  - 255 (Cheshire) AA Battery at Stalybridge
- 93rd AA Regiment, RA – New HAA unit raised in 1939
  - HQ, 288, 289 AA Batteries at Oxton, Birkenhead
  - 267 (Wirral) AA Battery at West Birkenhead – from 70th (3rd West Lancs) AA Rgt
  - 290 AA Battery at Chester
- 38th (The King's Regiment) AA Battalion, RE – As above
  - HQ, 350, 351, 352, 353 AA Companies at Liverpool
- 62nd (4th Bn Loyals) Searchlight Regiment – As above
  - HQ, 435, 436, 437 S/L Batteries at Preston
- 33rd AA Brigade Company, Royal Army Service Corps (RASC)

=== Phoney War and Battle of Britain ===
During the early part of the war the brigade's searchlight regiments were transferred to other formations and were replaced by new HAA and Light Anti-Aircraft (LAA) regiments. By the end of the Battle of Britain 33 AA Bde had the following units under command:

- 103 HAA Regiment – formed May 1940
- 106 HAA Regiment – formed August 1940
- 33 LAA Regiment (132 LAA Battery) – from Western Command at Liverpool
- 42 LAA Regiment – formed September 1939 from batteries of 17 and 36 LAA Regts
- Part of 65 LAA Regiment – formed November 1940

=== The Blitz ===
While the Battle of Britain raged over the skies of Southern England by day, there were also night raids on industrial cities, and Liverpool was heavily attacked for four nights in a row from 28 August. The night raids continued into the following Spring, during which period the city and its docks along the Mersey became the most heavily bombed area of Britain outside London. The campaign became known as the Liverpool Blitz, with particularly heavy attacks at Christmas 1940 (the Christmas Blitz), in April 1941, and again in May (the May Blitz).

==== Order of Battle 1940–41 ====
By the end of the Blitz the brigade had the following units under command:

- 1st HAA Rgt – Regular Army mobile regiment, transferred from 1st AA Bde at Crewe; part of War Office Reserve
  - 1, 2, 17 HAA Btys
  - 1 HAA Rgt Signals Section, Royal Corps of Signals (RCS)
  - 1 HAA Rgt Section, RASC
  - 1 HAA Rgt Workshop, Royal Army Ordnance Corps
- 93rd HAA Rgt
  - 267, 288, 289, 290 HAA Btys
- 103rd HAA Rgt
  - 322, 323, 324 HAA Btys
  - 420 Bty (joined between 27 June and 11 July 1941)
- 107th HAA Rgt – new unit formed September 1940, partly from 103rd HAA Rgt
  - 334, 335, 337, 390 HAA Btys
- 33rd LAA Rgt
  - 67, 68, 132 LAA Btys
- 4th AA 'Z' Rgt – new unit equipped with Z Battery rocket projectors, formed in 4 AA Division September 1940
  - 104, 108, 122, 132, 139 Z Btys

=== Mid-War ===
4 AA Division formation sign.

The Blitz ended in May 1941, but occasional raids continued. Newly formed units joining AA Command were increasingly 'mixed' ones into which women of the Auxiliary Territorial Service were integrated. Some of these were armed with Z Battery rocket projectiles that were partly manned by members of the Home Guard. At the same time, experienced units were posted away for service overseas. This continual turnover of units accelerated in 1942 with the preparations for Operation Torch and the need to relocate guns to counter the Baedeker Blitz and the Luftwaffe's hit-and-run attacks against South Coast towns.

==== Order of Battle 1941–42 ====
During this period the division was composed as follows (temporary detachments omitted):

- 1st HAA Rgt – as above; to Northern Ireland July 1941
- 93rd HAA Rgt – as above; to 44 AA Bde June 1942
  - 267, 288, 289 HAA Btys
- 95th HAA Rgt – joined September 1942; left for India October 1942
  - 204, 293, 240 HAA Btys
- 103rd HAA Rgt – as above; left for mobile training May 1942
  - 322, 323, 324 HAA Btys
  - 420 HAA Bty – joined July 1941; left April 1942
- 107th HAA Rgt – as above; left December 1941
- 117th HAA Rgt – joined autumn, to 70 AA Bde December 1941, returned May, left for Orkney and Shetland Defences (OSDEF) late August 1942
  - 370, 371 HAA Btys
  - 358 Bty – joined May, left July 1942
  - 369, 392 HAA Btys – left early August 1942
- 137th (Mixed) HAA Rgt – new unit formed November, joined December 1941, to 1 AA Group October 1942
  - 476, 481 (M) HA Btys
  - 477 (M) HAA Bty – to 142nd (Mixed) HAA Rgt January 1942
  - 487 (M) HAA Bty – from 142nd (M) HAA Rgt January 1942

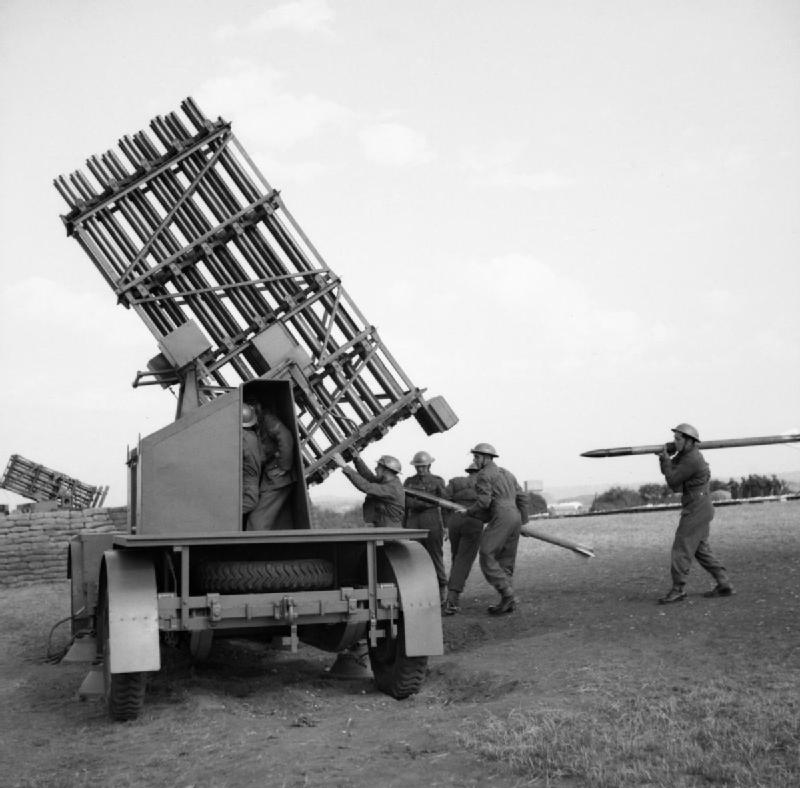
Loading a mobile multiple Z Battery launcher.

- 149th (Mixed) HAA Rgt – new unit formed February, joined April 1942
  - 506, 507, 512 (M) HAA Btys
- 154th (Mixed) HAA Rgt – new unit formed March, joined May 1942
  - 522, 526 (M) HAA Btys
  - 560 (M) HAA Bty – joined June 1942
  - 550 (M) HAA Bty – joined August 1942
- 29th LAA Rgt – joined autumn 1941, to 10 AA Division February 1942
  - 108, 121, 237 LAA Btys
- 33rd LAA Rgt – as above; to 2 AA Division autumn 1941
- 63rd LAA Rgt – from 70 AA Bde August 1942
  - 188, 189, 190, 457 LAA Btys
- 98th LAA Rgt – new unit formed December 1941, joined February, to 5 AA Division May 1942
  - 304, 305, 306, 481 LAA Btys
- 134th LAA Rgt – new unit formed February, joined June, to 57 AA Bde August 1942
  - 192, 275, 287 LAA Btys
  - 230 LAA Bty – left July 1942
  - 475 LAA Bty – joined July 1942
- 4th AA 'Z' Rgt – as above; to 70 AA Bde summer, rejoined autumn 1941, to 57 AA Bde August 1942
  - 194, 132, 139, 172 Z Btys
- 33 AA Brigade Signal Office Mixed Sub-Section (part of No 2 Company, 4 AA Division Mixed Signal Unit, RCS)

=== Later war ===
A reorganisation of AA Command in October 1942 saw the AA divisions disbanded and replaced by a smaller number of AA Groups more closely aligned with the organisation of RAF Fighter Command. 33 AA Brigade came under a new 4 AA Group covering North West England and the West Midlands.

==== Order of Battle 1942–44 ====
By this time the brigade was composed solely of HAA regiments following the redeployment of LAA guns to the South Coast. It was only in early 1943 that the brigade was reinforced:

- 93rd HAA Rgt – returned by October 1942; left for Middle East Forces (MEF) by mid-March 1943
  - 267, 288, 289, 290 HAA Btys
- 149th (M) HAA Rgt – to 53 AA Bde May 1943
  - 506, 507, 512, 587 (M) HAA Btys
- 154th (M) HAA Rgt – to 2 AA Group October 1943
- 522, 526, 590 (M) HAA Btys
- 550 (M) HAA Bty – left December 1942
- 552 (M) HAA Bty – joined January 1943
- 157th (M) HAA Rgt – from 2 AA Group October 1943
  - 505, 539, 550, 551 (M) HAA Btys
- 179th (M) HAA Rgt – from 2 AA Group October 1943
  - 584, 606, 607, 641 (M) HAA Btys
- 184th (M) HAA Rgt – new unit formed November 1942, joined April 1943; to 44 AA Bde by August 1943
  - 616, 617, 625, 627 (M) HAA Btys
- 190th (M) HAA Rgt – new unit formed January 1943, joined May 1943
  - 642, 664, 665, 667 (M) HAA Btys
- 4th (M) AA 'Z' Rgt – returned May 1943
  - 104, 132, 214 Z Btys
  - 230 Z Bty – left end 1943
- 14th (M) AA 'Z' Rgt – from 1 AA Group May 1943
  - 108, 172, 201, 202, 226 Z Btys

==== Order of Battle 1944 ====
In March 1944 the number of brigade HQs in 4 AA Group was reduced, and 33 AA Bde HQ was temporarily given additional responsibilities until these units were redistributed, mainly to the south of England to cover the embarkation ports for Operation Overlord:

- 157th (M) HAA Rgt – as above
- 159th (M) HAA Rgt – joined March, to 6 AA Group August 1944
  - 542, 543, 563, 614 (M) HAA Btys
- 167th (M) HAA Rgt – joined March 1944; to 1 AA Group May 1944
  - 464, 562, 610 (M) HAA Btys
- 179th (M) HAA Rgt – as above; to 2 AA Group May 1944
- 190th (M) HAA Rgt – as above; to 61 AA Bde May 1944
- 196th HAA Rgt – from OSDEF June 1944; disbanded July 1944
  - 351, 661, 662 HAA Btys
- 88th LAA Rgt – joined March, to 2 AA Group May 1944
  - 178, 289, 293 LAA Btys
- 4th AA Area Mixed Rgt – redesignated 1944
- 13th AA Area Mixed Rgt – joined March 1944
  - 122, 203, 204, 205, 216 Z Btys
- 14th AA Area Mixed Rgt – redesignated 1944

By October 1944, AA Command was being forced to release manpower to 21st Army Group fighting in North West Europe and 33 AA was reduced to one HAA regiment (157th; replaced by 169th – 566, 571, 576 (M) HAA Btys – in December) and its three AA Area Mixed regiments. At this date its own HQ establishment was 9 officers, 8 male other ranks and 25 members of the ATS, together with a small number of attached drivers, cooks and mess orderlies (male and female). In addition, the brigade had a Mixed Signal Office Section of 5 male other ranks and 19 ATS, which was formally part of the Group signal unit.

=== War's end ===
As the war neared its end there was a continued run-down of AA Command: 4 AA Group was disbanded in mid-March 1945, and 33 AA Bde transferred to the command of 5 AA Group. By this time, the brigade consisted solely of the rocket batteries of the three AA Area Mixed Rgts, and as these were disbanded in April. were disbanded during March and April, the brigade HQ soon had nothing to command. In May 1945, after the end of the war in Europe (VE Day), it was given control of 12 Area AA Maintenance HQ to administer the demobilisation process, with 37th (Tyne Electrical Engineers) and 69th (3rd City of London) S/L Rgts added in June. By November it was commanding a number of returned Regular Army units, together with others awaiting demobilisation:

- 2nd HAA Rgt – returned from MEF
  - 16, 20, 28 HAA Btys
- 4th HAA Rgt – returned from MEF
  - 5, 6, 258 HAA Btys
- 7th HAA Rgt – returned from Siege of Malta
  - 10, 13, 27 HAA Btys
- 130th HAA Rgt
  - 442, 443, 448 HAA Btys
- 69th (3rd City of London) S/L Rgt
  - 354, 456, 457 S/L Btys

== Postwar ==
On 1 January 1947, 33 AA Bde's Regular Army units reformed 9 AA Bde in Wales, while the TA portion was renumbered as 59th Anti-Aircraft Brigade (Note: The TA AA brigades were now numbered 51 and upwards, rather than 26 and upwards as in the 1930s; the wartime 59th AA Bde was converted into an infantry brigade in 1945.) in the reformed TA, constituting part of 4 AA Group based at Warrington:

- Brigade HQ at Woolton, Liverpool
- 360 HAA Regt – formerly 81 HAA Regt; see above
- 493 HAA Regt, Birkenhead – formerly 93 HAA Regt; see above
- 515 (Isle of Man) LAA Regt, Douglas –formerly 15 (Isle of Man) LAA Regt
- 521 LAA Regt, Chester – formerly 21 LAA Regt; merged into 349 Regt 30 September 1950
- 596 (South Lancashire) LAA Regt, St Helens – from 612 (South Lancashire) Infantry Regt RA, formerly 61 Searchlight Regt and originally 5th Battalion, South Lancashire Regiment

AA Command was disbanded on 10 March 1955 and there was a series of reductions and mergers in the TA's AA units. 59 AA Brigade was itself placed in suspended animation on 31 October 1955 and formally disbanded on 31 December 1957.

== A new brigade ==
A new 33rd AA Bde was formed on 1 November 1955 at Shepherd's Bush, London, by redesignation of X AA Bde (formerly 63 AA Bde). It had no links with Western Command or Merseyside. This brigade was reorganised on 1 May 1961, becoming 33 Artillery Brigade in 56th (London) Division.

== Online sources ==
- British Army units from 1945 on
- British Military History
- Orders of Battle at Patriot Files
- The Royal Artillery 1939–45
- Graham Watson, The Territorial Army 1947
