= 44th Anti-Aircraft Brigade =

44th Anti-Aircraft Brigade 70 Anti-Aircraft Brigade
- Active: 29 September 1938–11 December 1944; 1 January 1947 – 31 October 1955
- Country: United Kingdom
- Branch: Territorial Army
- Type: Anti-Aircraft Brigade
- Role: Air Defence
- Part of: 4 AA Division; 4 AA Group; 6 AA Group
- Garrison/HQ: Manchester; Newport, Isle of Wight; Salford, Greater Manchester
- Engagements: Battle of Britain; Manchester Blitz; Operation Diver

Commanders
- Notable commanders: Brigadier Gerald Rickards, DSO, MC; Brigadier Erroll Tremlett; Brigadier Vere Krohn, MC, TD

44th Anti-Aircraft Brigade (44 AA Bde) was an air defence formation of Britain's Territorial Army (TA). Formed in 1938, it was responsible for protecting Manchester and later the Isle of Wight during the Second World War. It was reformed postwar under a new title, and continued until 1955.

== Origin ==
With the expansion of Britain's Anti-Aircraft (AA) defences in the late 1930s, new formations were created to command the growing number of Royal Artillery (RA) and Royal Engineers (RE) AA gun and searchlight (S/L) units. 44th AA Brigade was raised on 29 September 1938 at Manchester. It formed part of 4th AA Division, which was responsible for defending North West England. The first brigade commander (appointed 22 October 1938) was Brigadier Gerald Rickards, DSO, MC.

== Mobilisation ==
At the time the brigade was formed, the TA's AA units were in a state of mobilisation because of the Munich crisis, although they were soon stood down. In February 1939 the TA's AA defences came under the control of a new Anti-Aircraft Command. In June, as international tensions grew in the run-up to the Second World War, a partial mobilisation of AA Command was begun in a process known as 'couverture', whereby each unit did a month's tour of duty in rotation to man selected AA gun and searchlight positions. AA Command mobilised fully on 24 August, ahead of the official declaration of war on 3 September.

=== Order of Battle 1939–40 ===
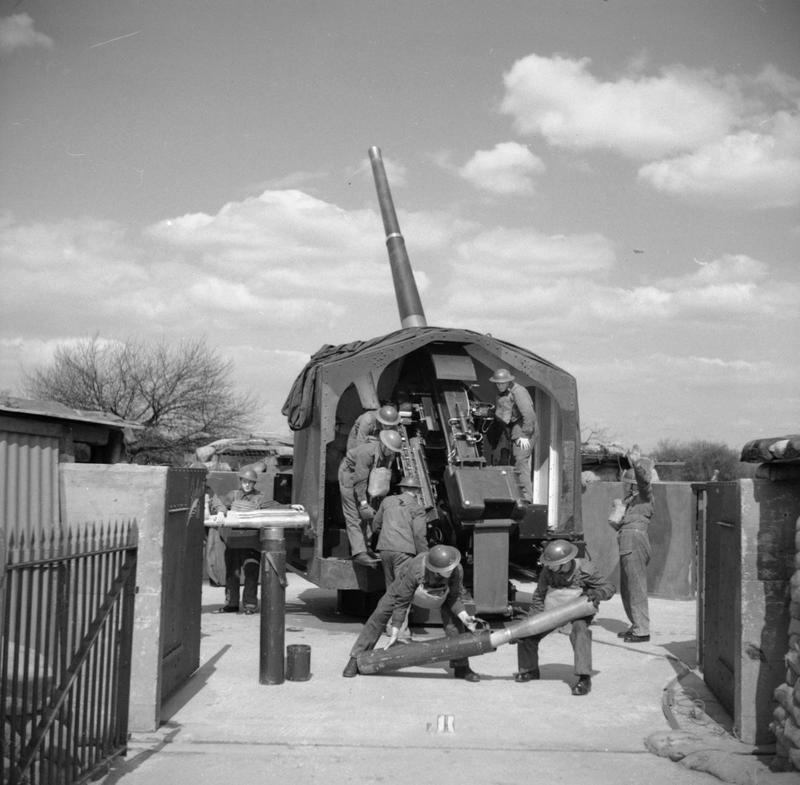
4.5-inch gun and crew, 1941

The composition of the brigade upon mobilisation in August 1939 was as follows:

- 65th (The Manchester Regiment) Anti-Aircraft Regiment, RA (TA) – Heavy AA (HAA) unit formed at Hulme in 1936 by conversion of 6th/7th Battalion Manchester Regiment
  - HQ, 181st, 182nd, 183rd and 192nd AA Batteries, RA
- 81st Anti-Aircraft Regiment, RA (TA) – HAA unit formed at Stockport and Stalybridge in 1938 by conversion of 60th (6th Cheshire and Shropshire) Medium Brigade, RA
  - HQ, 253, 254, 255 (Cheshire) AA Batteries, RA
- 80th Independent Light Anti-Aircraft Battery, RA – new Light AA (LAA) unit
- 39th (The Lancashire Fusiliers) Anti-Aircraft Battalion, RE (TA) – Searchlight (S/L) unit formed at Salford in 1936 by conversion of 7th Bn Lancashire Fusiliers
  - HQ, 354th, 355th, 356th and 357th AA Companies, RE
- 62nd (The Loyals) Searchlight Regiment, RA (TA) – S/L unit formed at Preston (later Lytham) in 1936 by conversion of 4th Bn The Loyal Regiment (North Lancashire)
  - HQ, 435th, 436th and 437th S/L Btys, RA
- 71st (East Lancashire) Searchlight Regiment, RA (TA) – new S/L unit raised in Manchester in 1938
  - HQ, 462nd, 463rd and 464th S/L Btys, RA
- 44th AA Brigade Company, Royal Army Service Corps (RASC) (TA)

== Phoney War ==
When the code word to mobilise was issued on 24 August, 65th AA Rgt was returning from a practice camp at Burrowhead in Scotland and went straight to its war stations. 39th S/L Bn and one battery of 62nd S/L Bn had transport standing by and were able to return immediately from their couverture deployment with 2 AA Division in East Yorkshire to man their war stations. 81st AA Regiment manned two HAA battery sites and also deployed Lewis guns as LAA cover for the Vital Point (VP) of the Metropolitan-Vickers factory at Trafford Park. 80th LAA Bty and 71st S/L Rgt also manned VPs. By midnight the brigade was disposed as follows:

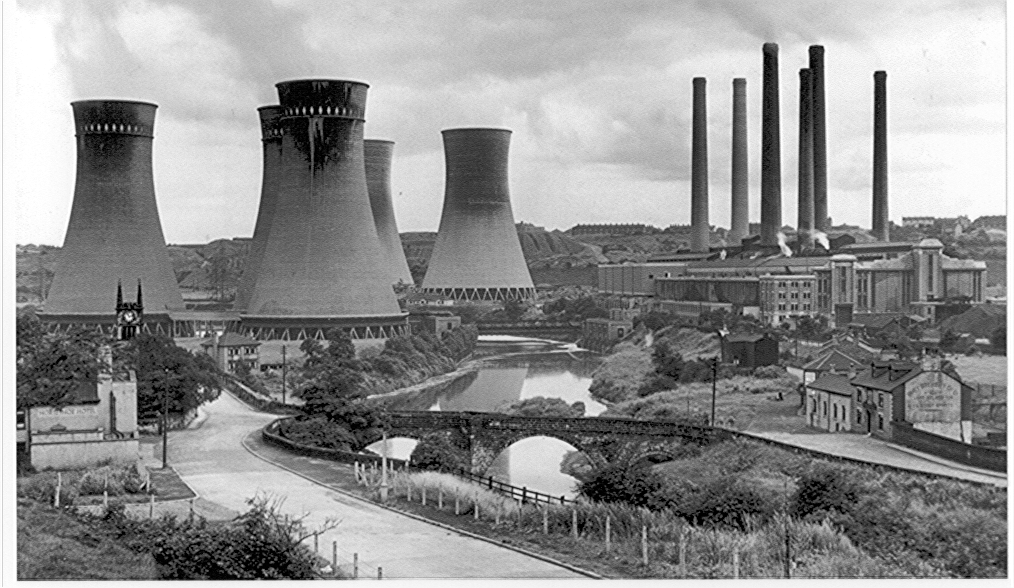
Kearsley Power Station: a vital point to be defended

HAA guns

- 65th AA Rgt
  - 181 Bty – 2 x 3-inch
  - 183 Bty – 4 x static 3.7-inch
  - 196 Bty – 2 x 3-inch
- 81st AA Rgt
  - 253 Bty – 2 x 3-inch
  - 254 Bty – 4 x 3-inch

LAA guns

- 80th LAA Bty – 1 x Bofors 40 mm gun and 12 x Lewis guns at Kearsley Power Station
- 81st HAA Rgt – 15 x Lewis guns at Metropolitan-Vickers
- 71st S/L Rgt – 8 x Lewis guns at the Clayton Aniline Company

S/Ls

- 71st S/L Rgt – 4 x lights

In the next 24 hours more HAA gun sites were reported ready for action, around 60 S/Ls were deployed and the number of Lewis guns at VPs was increased, with 39th S/L Bttn guarding the Manchester Ship Canal, Salford docks and Barton Power Station. In addition, the women of the Auxiliary Territorial Service (ATS) companies were taking over their duties with the regiments.

On 1 November the brigade was reorganised, with 39th and 71st S/L Rgts transferring to the command of 53rd Light AA Bde covering the Mersey area, followed shortly afterwards by 62nd S/L Rgt. Simultaneously, 21st (69, 136 & 143 Btys at Liverpool) and its newly formed offshoot 41st (133, 134 & 135 Btys) LAA Rgts transferred from 53rd LAA Bde and took over command of the LAA batteries manning VPs in 44 AA Bde's area, (42, 82 and 129 Btys), while 80th LAA Bty ceased to be an independent unit and came under 21st LAA Rgt. The commander of 44th AA Bde was named AA Defence Commander (AADC) for the Manchester Gun Zone. New VPs taken over by the brigade included ICI's Lostock Gralam works and Crewe Junction (136 LAA Bty), Baxter's respirator factory at Leyland (133 LAA Bty), Royal Ordnance Factory, Chorley, (133 & 135 LAA Btys), Carlisle Junction (134 LAA Bty) and de Havilland's Lostock works (181 AA Bty, later 253 AA Bty).

Despite a number of alerts, there were no enemy air raids in the brigade's area for some time. In November, the brigade received 4.5-inch HAA guns to re-equip three of its four-gun HAA sites, and 436 S/L Bty relieved 134 LAA Bty so that it could be sent to train on the Vickers MkVIII 'pom-pom' gun. In June 1940 the AA regiments were redesignated 'HAA' to distinguish them from the growing number of LAA units, while in August all the RE AA battalions and infantry battalions converted to S/L duties became Searchlight Regiments of the RA.

== Battle of Britain and Blitz ==
4 AA Divisional sign

Most of the air raids in 4 AA Division's area during the Battle of Britain were in the West Midlands or over the Mersey. A few bombs fell on Manchester and Crewe on 27/28 August, and across East Lancashire the following night. Night raids increased during the autumn as the Battle of Britain was followed by the Blitz. 65th (Manchester Regiment) HAA Rgt moved to the Orkney & Shetland Defence Force (OSDEF) in the first week of October 1940, being replaced by 70th (3rd West Lancashire) HAA Rgt from 33 (Western) AA Bde.

Some examples of Gun-laying Mk I radar began to arrive for the HAA batteries, Bofors 40 mm guns appeared in increasing numbers for the LAA regiments, and the AA divisions formed units equipped with Z Battery rocket projectiles. In November 1940 the expansion of AA Command led to the creation of new AA Divisions. 44 AA Brigade remained in 4 AA Division and was responsible for Manchester and the surrounding area, including the shipyards of Barrow-in-Furness, but Brigadier Rickards was promoted to command the new 12 AA Division from 15 November. He was succeeded in command of 44 AA Bde by Lt-Col Erroll Tremlett, a former first-class cricketer who had distinguished himself commanding 54th (Argyll and Sutherland Highlanders) LAA Rgt at the Dunkirk evacuation, where his guns had defended the Mole and protected the embarkation of many of the troops.

=== Manchester Blitz ===
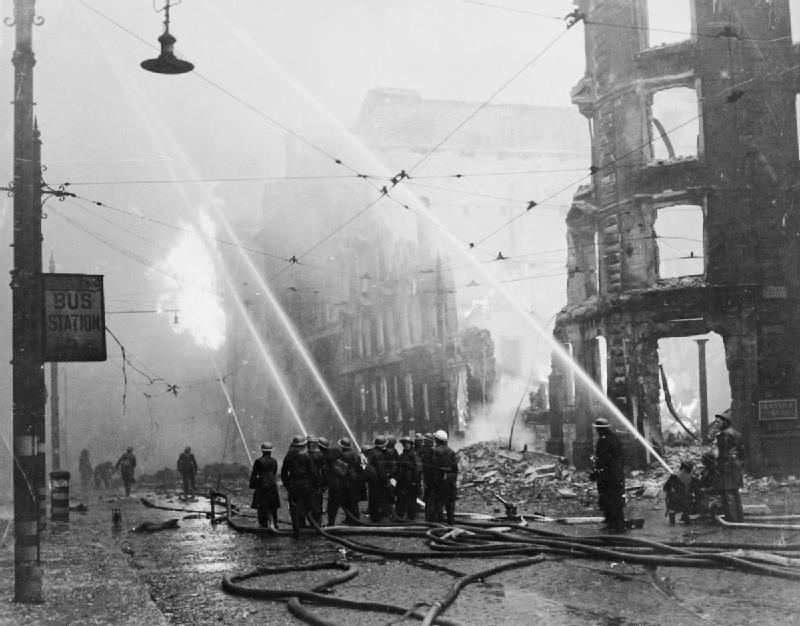
Firefighters putting out a blaze at a bomb site in Manchester city centre

The cities of NW England were heavily bombed during the winter of 1940–41 (the Liverpool Blitz and Manchester Blitz). On the night of 21/22 November the Manchester guns engaged raiders on their way to and from Liverpool, and on the following two nights it was Manchester's turn to be hit. Raids on Manchester peaked at Christmas. The Royal Artillery's historian considered that during these attacks on British cities 'the actions fought [by the AA batteries] were as violent, dangerous and prolonged as any in the field'. 'On an HAA 4.5-inch position of 44th AA Brigade in Manchester, the power rammer on one gun failed. One Gunner loaded 127 of the [86 pounds (39 kg)] rounds himself in eleven hours of action, despite injuries to his fingers'.

=== Order of Battle 1940–41 ===
During the winter of 1940–41, the composition of 44 AA Bde was as follows:

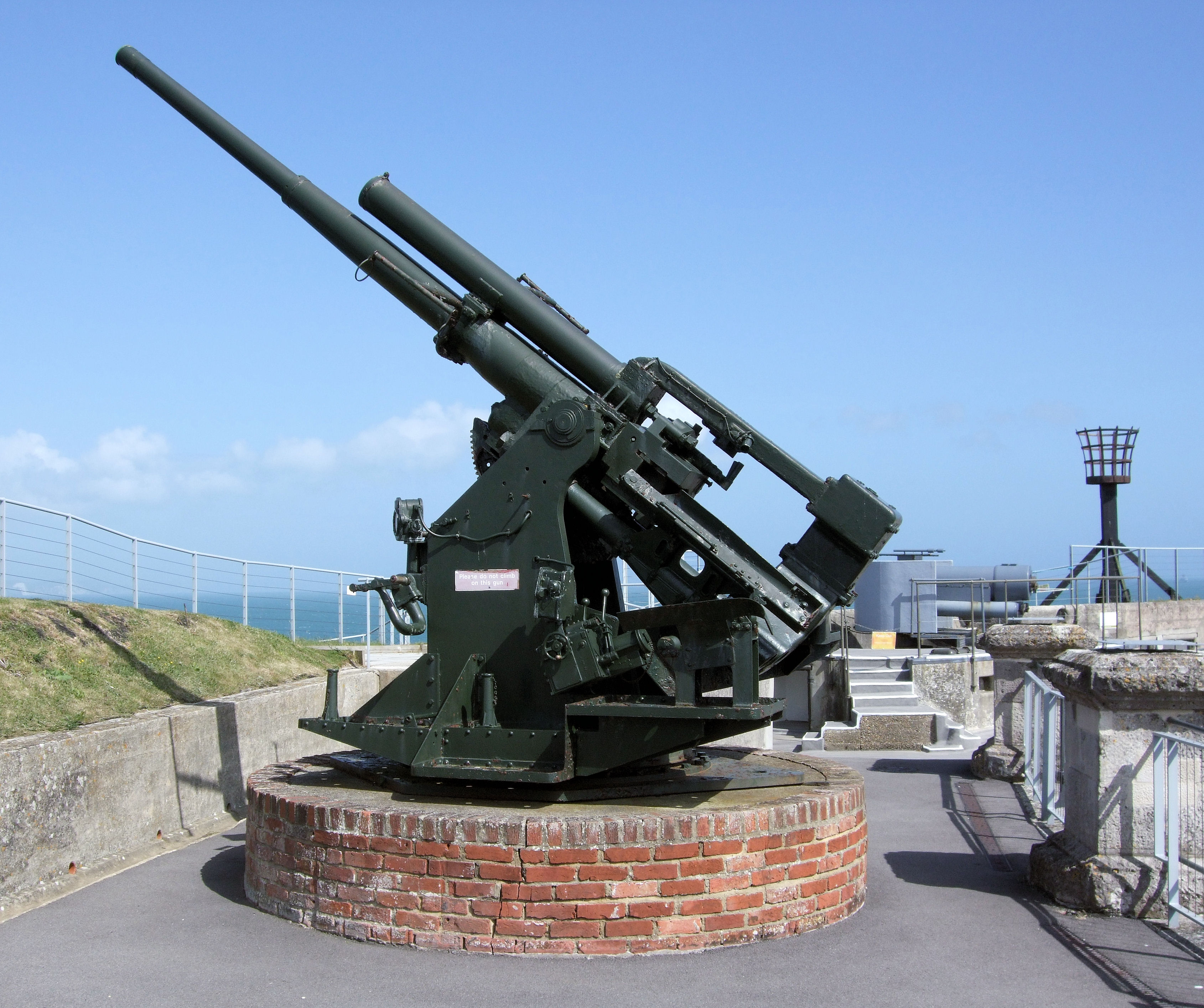
Static 3.7-inch gun preserved at Nothe Fort

- 70th (3rd West Lancashire) HAA Rgt
  - 211, 212, 216 HAA Btys – at Manchester
  - 309 HAA Bty – joined by January, left by August 1941
  - 245 HAA Bty – attached from 78th HAA Rgt November 1940
- 98th HAA Rgt – joined by January 1941
  - 300, 301, 320 HAA Btys – Manchester suburbs
  - 399 HAA Bty – joined by May 1941
- 106th HAA Rgt – new regiment formed August 1940; to 11 AA Division by January 1941
  - 331 HAA Bty – at Barrow
  - 332 HAA Bty – at Crewe
- 115th HAA Rgt – new regiment formed November 1940, joined by January 1941
  - 361 HAA Bty – at Blackpool
  - 365 HAA Bty – joined by May 1941
  - 367 HAA Bty – at Barrow
- 21st LAA Rgt
  - 69 LAA Bty – VPs at Preston
  - 80 LAA Bty – VPs at Leyland
  - 136 LAA Bty – VPs at Barrow
- 41st LAA Rgt – to 7 AA Division 1 March 1941
  - 133 LAA Bty – VPs at Carlisle
  - 134 LAA Bty – VPs at Maryport
  - 143 LAA Bty – VPs at Gretna Green
- 54th (Argyll and Sutherland Highlanders) LAA Rgt – returned from Dunkirk; left AA Command 10 March 1941 and joined the Support Group of 9th Armoured Division
  - 160 LAA Bty – VPs at Woodford
  - 161 LAA Bty – VPs at Ringway, de Havilland works Lostock, Irlam Locks
  - 162 LAA Bty – VPs at Winnington, ICI Lostock, Rolls-Royce Crewe
- 63rd LAA Rgt – new unit formed October 1940; to 11 AA Division by May 1941
  - 189, 190 LAA Btys – at Preston
- 65th LAA Rgt – new unit formed November 1940; joined by January 1941
  - 194 LAA By – VP at English Electric Company, Preston
  - 195 LAA Bty – VPs at Heysham
  - 196 LAA Bty – VPs at Blackpool
- 76th LAA Rgt – new unit formed February 1941; joined by May 1941
  - 226, 227, 228 LAA Btys
- 4th AA 'Z' Regt – formed September 1940
  - 108 'Z' Bty – at Barrow
  - 122 'Z' Bty – at Accrington
  - 135 'Z' Bty – at Manchester

== Mid-War ==
The Blitz is generally held to have ended on 16 May 1941. By now the HAA sites had the advantage of GL Mk I* radar with an elevation finding (E/F or 'Effie') attachment to supplement searchlights. At this stage of the war, experienced units were being posted away to train for service overseas. This led to a continual turnover of units, which accelerated with the preparations for the invasion of North Africa (Operation Torch) in late 1942 and the need to transfer units to counter the Luftwaffe's Baedeker Blitz and hit-and-run attacks on the South Coast. However, newly formed units continued to join AA Command, the HAA and support units increasingly becoming 'Mixed' units, indicating that women of the ATS were fully integrated into them. Members of the Home Guard (HG) also provided manpower, particularly for 'Z' Batteries.

Brigadier Tremlett was promoted to command 10 AA Division from 14 February 1942, and was succeeded at 44 AA Bde by Brig R.E. Kane, OBE, MC.

=== Order of Battle 1941–42 ===
During this period the brigade was composed as follows:

- 58th (Kent) HAA Rgt – joined February, left to join First Army for Operation Torch May 1942
  - 207, 208, 264 HAA Btys
  - 434 HAA Bty – attached from 70 HAA Rgt February, left April 1942
- 62nd (Northumbrian) HAA Rgt – temporarily attached July 1942 while under War Office (WO) Control; later to Operation Torch
  - 172, 173, 266 HAA Btys
- 70th HAA Rgt – mobilised and embarked for India February 1942
  - 211, 212, 216 Btys
  - 309 Bty – left by August 1941
  - 434 Bty – new battery joined by August 1941
- 81st HAA Rgt – rejoined from OSDEF, June 1941; to new 70 AA Bde summer 1941'
  - 253, 254, 255, 416 Btys
- 93rd HAA Rgt – from 7 AA Division July, left for Middle East August 1942
  - 267, 288, 289, 290 HAA Btys
- 98th HAA Rgt – to 8 AA Division May 1942
  - 300, 301, 320, 399 Btys
- 115th HAA Rgt – to OSDEF June 1941
  - 361, 365, 367 HAA Btys
- 149th (Mixed) HAA Rgt – new unit formed February 1942
  - 506, 507, 512, 581 (M) HAA Btys
- 151st (Mixed) HAA Rgt – new unit formed February, joined April, left July 1942
  - 510, 511, 514, 516 (M) HAA Btys
  - 290 HAA Bty – attached from 93rd HAA Rgt
  - 371 HAA Bty – attached from 117th HAA Rgt
- 169th (Mixed) HAA Rgt – new unit formed August 1942
  - 566, 571, 576, 578 (M) HAA Btys
- 21st LAA Rgt – embarked for Middle East December 1941, diverted to Far East and captured in Java March 1942
  - 69, 80, 136 Btys
- 39th LAA Rgt – joined by August 1941; to 53 AA Bde autumn; rejoined December 1941; to 53 AA Bde July 1942
  - 110, 111, 240 Btys
  - 48 LAA Bty – attached from 42nd LAA Rgt August 1941
- 65th LAA Rgt – left for Malta Command 1941
  - 194, 195, 196 Btys
- 76th LAA Rgt – to 70 AA Bde summer 1941
  - 226, 227, 228 Btys
- 88th LAA Rgt – new unit formed October 1941, joined by February 1942
  - 178, 289, 293 LAA Btys
  - 477 LAA Bty – detached to 7 AA Division until May 1942
- 13th AA 'Z' Rgt – 4th AA 'Z' Rgt redesignated by August 1941
  - 108, 122 'Z' Btys
  - 135 'Z' Bty – left by February 1942
  - 131, 184, 188 'Z' Btys – joined by February 1942
  - 203, 204, 205 'Z' Btys – joined September 1942
- 44 AA Brigade Signal Office Mixed Sub-Section, Royal Corps of Signals (RCS) – part of No 2 Company, 4 AA Division Mixed Signal Unit

== Later war ==
At the end of September 1942, AA Command disbanded the AA Corps and Divisions and replaced them with new AA Groups, whose areas of responsibility coincided with the Groups of RAF Fighter Command. 44 AA Brigade came under 4 AA Group, with its HQ at Preston, which covered NW England and N Wales and operated with No. 9 Group RAF. 4 AA Group's area was quiet throughout the following year, and in May 1943 4 AA Bde had to 'un-man' some of its VPs to provide LAA guns and crews to 5 AA Group in Eastern England, which was dealing with 'hit and run' raids by the Luftwaffe. When in September 1943 AA Command was required to release manpower to 21st Army Group forming for the planned invasion of Normandy (Operation Overlord), the group began to lose units by transfer and disbandment. On 14 January 1944, Brigadier Kane was transferred to command 45 AA Bde and was replaced by Brig J.W. Barker, TD.

=== Order of Battle 1942–44 ===
During this period the brigade was composed as follows (temporary attachments omitted):

- 149th (Mixed) HAA Rgt – to 6 AA Group June 1943
  - 506, 507, 512, 581 (M) HAA Btys
  - 376 (M) HAA Bty – attached from 131st HAA Rgt
- 159th (Mixed) HAA Rgt – from 1 AA Group October 1943
  - 542, 545, 563, 614 (M) HAA Btys
- 167th (Mixed) HAA Rgt – from 1 AA Group September 1943
  - 464, 562, 610, 639 (M) HAA Btys
  - 639 (M) HAA Bty – disbanded January 1944
- 169th (M) HAA Rgt – to 1 AA Group October 1943
  - 566, 571, 576, 578 (M) HAA Btys
  - 71 West Lancashire HG HAA Bty
- 184th (Mixed) HAA Rgt – from 33 AA Bde June, to 1 AA Group September 1943
  - 616, 617, 625, 627 (M) HAA Btys
- 88th LAA Rgt
  - 178 LAA Bty attached to 5 AA Group May 1943
  - 289, 293, 477 LAA Btys
  - 449 LAA Bty – attached from 114th LAA Rgt April, to 5 AA Group May 1943

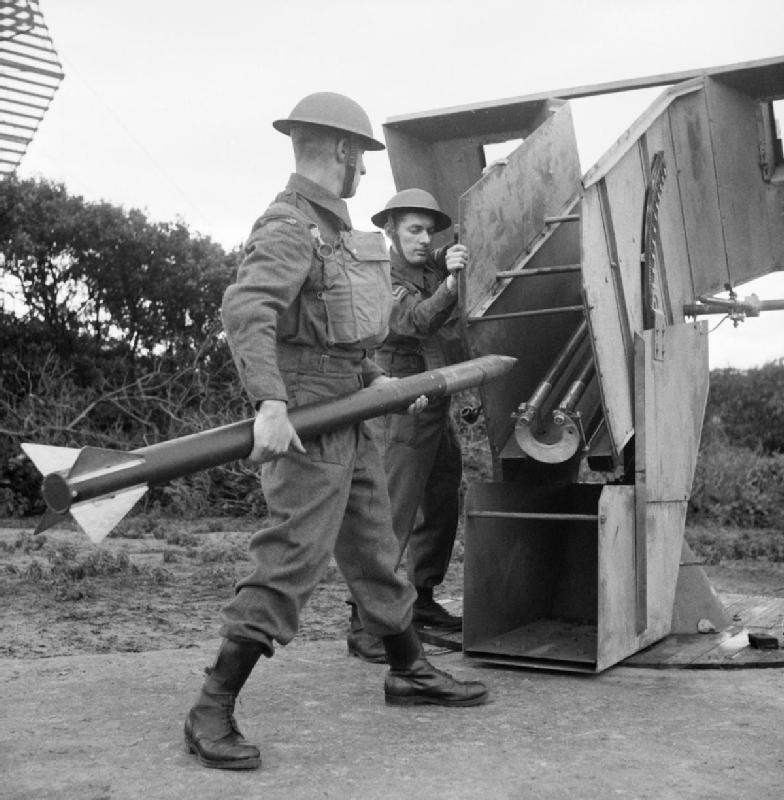
Home Guard soldiers load a single launcher on a static 'Z' Battery in NW England, July 1942.

- 13th AA 'Z' Rgt – became Mixed November 1942
  - 108 'Z' Bty – manned by 105 West Lancashire HG
  - 122 (M) 'Z' Bty – partly manned by 101 County of Lancaster HG
  - 131 'Z' Bty – left by April 1943
  - 184 'Z' Bty – left November 1942
  - 188 'Z' Bty – joined November 1942; left January 1943
  - 203 (M) 'Z' Bty – partly manned by 102 County of Lancaster HG
  - 204 (M) 'Z' Bty – partly manned by 103 County of Lancaster HG
  - 205 (M) 'Z' Bty – partly manned by 104 County of Lancaster HG
  - 216 (M) 'Z' Bty – joined November 1942; partly manned by 105 County of Lancaster HG
  - 226 'Z' Bty – manned by 104 West Lancashire HG
- 44 AA Bde Mixed Signal Office, RCS – part of 2 Mixed Signal Company, 4 AA Group Mixed Signal Unit
- 842 (Semi-Mobile) Smoke Company, Pioneer Corps (PC)
- 4 Smoke Company, Non-Combatant Corps, PC
- No 14 LAA Practice Camp – at Nethertown, Egremont
- 131, 132 Lancashire HG LAA Btys
- B, C Lancashire HG Independent LAA Troops

== Operations Overlord and Diver ==
In March 1944, 44 AA Bde HQ was moved from Manchester to take over the AA defences on the Isle of Wight. Here it came under the command of 6 AA Group, which had responsibility for covering the 'Overlord' embarkation ports around the Solent and Portsmouth. The brigade established its HQ at 'Broadlands', Staplers Road, Newport, and took over command of 82nd (Essex) HAA Rgt and 151st LAA Rgt from 47 AA Bde and was soon reinforced. Additional LAA guns (mainly Bofors, with a few Oerlikon 20 mm cannon) were sited singly at Yarmouth, Shanklin, Sandown and Ventnor.

Brigadier Vere Krohn, MC, TD, a former head of AA Command's technical branch, arrived from 43 AA Bde to take command on 2 May, and began redeploying the HAA sites and additional radar-controlled searchlights to tackle aircraft attempting to lay mines in the Solent. There were sporadic attacks, with 619/185, 182/136 and 438/136 HAA Btys submitting claims for 'kills' on 15, 16 and 23 May, but the Luftwaffe failed to disrupt the 'Overlord' preparations.

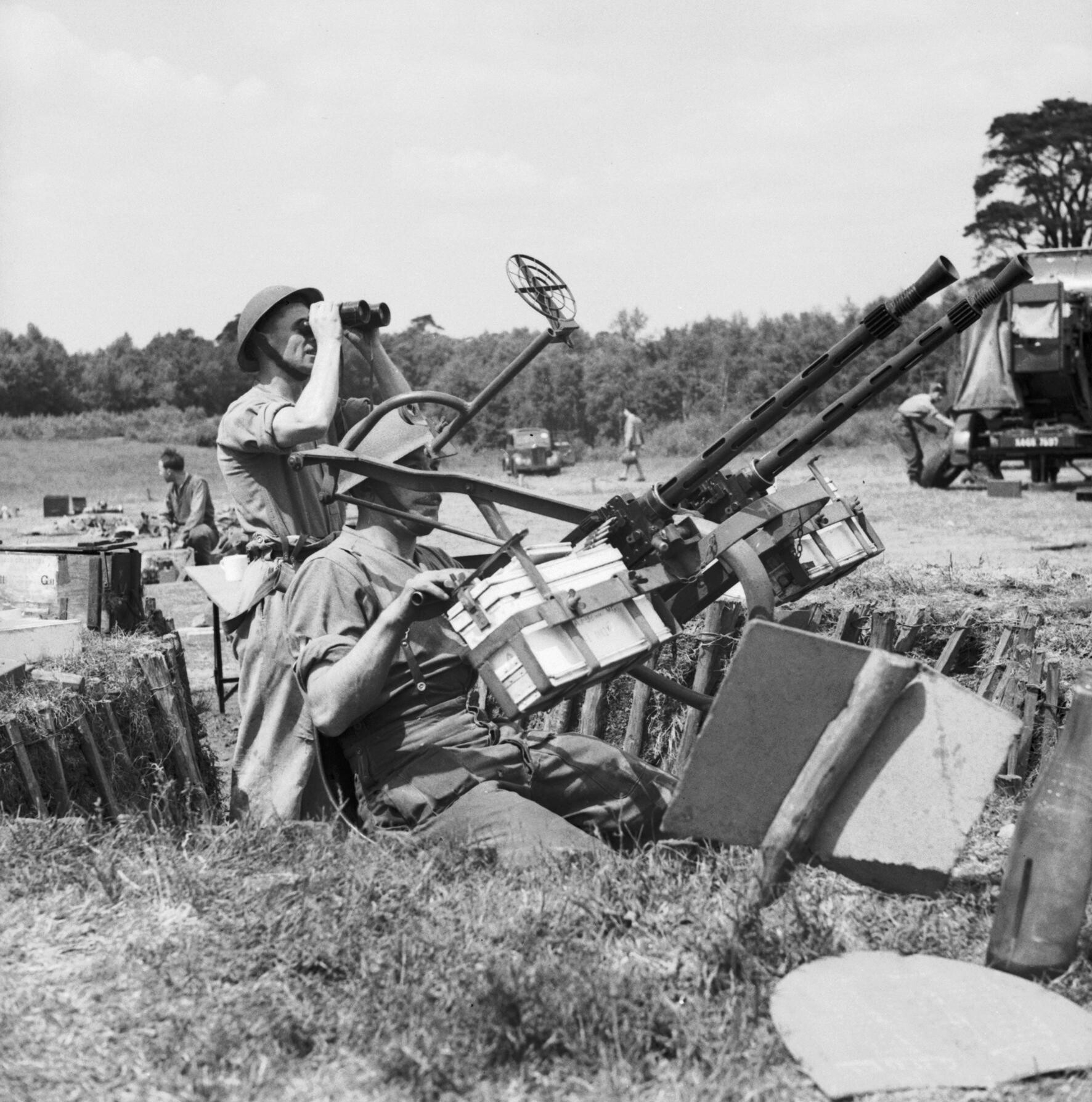
Crew of a twin Browning LAA gun keep watch for divers, 19 June 19544.

A week after D-Day the long-awaited attacks on London by V-1 flying bombs ('Divers') began. AA Command had prepared Operation Diver to counter these weapons, and AA guns were moved from all over the UK to strengthen 2 AA Group's 'Diver Belt' in South East England. 6 AA Group also deployed additional HAA batteries in the Solent–Portsmouth defences. The first V-1 appeared over the Isle of Wight on 26 June, and 44 AA Bde redeployed its LAA guns in an anti-Diver role, including twin Browning .50 Machine Guns from S/L sites in the west of the island. However, the V-1 launch sites in Normandy were quickly overrun, and few missiles were seen in the Solent–Portsmouth area. As 21st Army Group overran the main launch sites in the Pas-de-Calais, the Luftwaffe shifted its focus to air-launching V-1s over the North Sea during the autumn, and AA Command redeployed units from the South Coast to Eastern England in response.

44 AA Brigade 'blacked out' its searchlights on 12 November apart from those required as homing beacons for friendly aircraft, and the crews were sent to provide construction parties for the gun sites in the new 'Diver Strip'. In early December it handed over its remaining commitments to 67 AA Bde, and Brigade HQ was disbanded on 31 December 1944.

=== Order of Battle 1944 ===
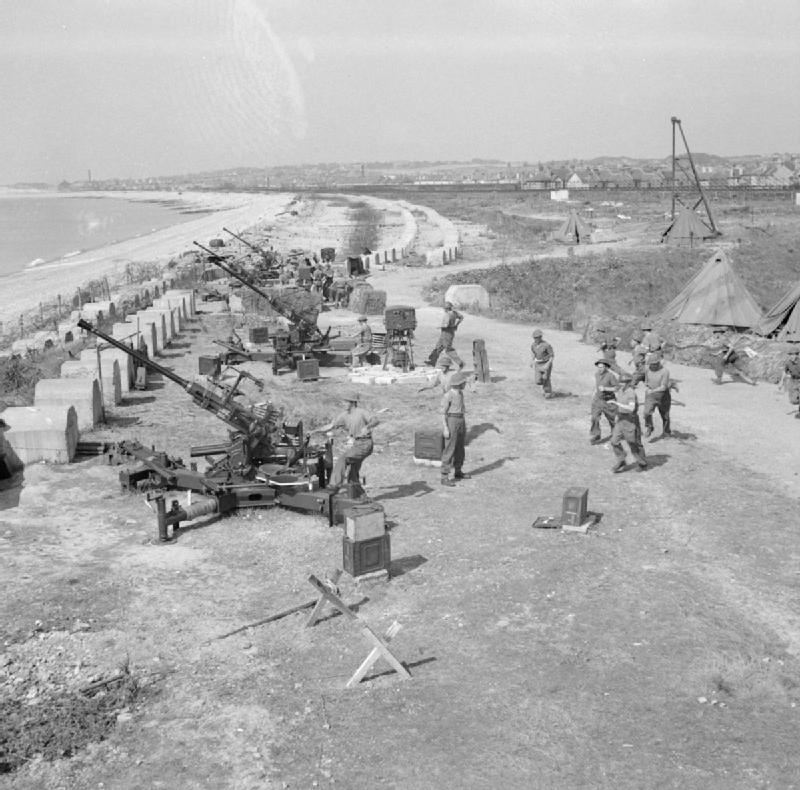
Bofors guns on anti-Diver duty, South Coast, 1944

During this period the composition of the brigade was as follows:

- 12th HAA Rgt – base and port defence unit from 21st Army Group June 1944
  - 4, 18, 360 HAA Btys
- 82nd (Essex) HAA Rgt – to 3 AA Group May 1944
  - 156, 228 (Edinburgh), 256 HAA Btys
  - 193 HAA Bty – returned to 44 AA Bde area 28 June 1944
- 136th HAA Rgt – from 1 AA Group May; to 2 AA Group Diver Belt 17 June 1944
  - 182, 409, 432, 468 HAA Btys
- 177th HAA Rgt – from 67 AA Bde May; disbanded June 1944
  - 203, 598, 600 HAA Btys
- 619 (M) HAA Bty – from 185th (M) HAA Rgt; to 5 AA Group 7 October 1944
- 526 (M) HAA Bty – from 154th (M) HAA Rgt 6 October 1944
- 151st LAA Rgt – to 1 AA Group 19–24 October 1944
  - 449, 472, 478 LAA Btys
- 52 LAA Bty – from 85th LAA Rgt summer; to 2 AA Group 2 September 1944
- 277 LAA Bty – from 83rd LAA Rgt 24 October 1944
- 53rd (Royal Northumberland Fusiliers) S/L Rgt – from 2 AA Group May 1944
  - 408, 409, 410 S/L Btys
- 303 AA Gun Operations Room (AAGOR)
- 506 AA Ground Control Interception (AAGCI) station
- 44 AA Bde Signal Section

By October 1944, the brigade's HQ establishment was 8 officers, 7 male other ranks and 22 members of the ATS, together with a small number of attached drivers, cooks and mess orderlies (male and female). In addition, the brigade had a Mixed Signal Office Section of 5 male other ranks and 19 ATS, which was formally part of the Group signal unit.

The brigade was disbanded on 11 December 1944.

== Postwar ==
When the TA was reconstituted in 1947, 44 AA Bde reformed at Salford, Greater Manchester as 70th AA Brigade (TA) (taking the number of a disbanded wartime formation from 4 AA Division) and forming part of 4 AA Group at Warrington. It now comprised the following units:

- 465th (Manchester) HAA Rgt – former 65th HAA Rgt as above
- 556th (East Lancashire) HAA Rgt
- 574th (The Lancashire Fusiliers) (Mixed) HAA Rgt at Salford – former 39th S/L Rgt as above
- 606th (East Lancashire) (Mixed) HAA Rgt – former 71st S/L Rgt as above
- 293rd (East Lancashire) LAA Rgt
- 70 Fire Command Troop, RA

('Mixed' indicated that members of the Women's Royal Army Corps were integrated into the unit.)

AA Command was disbanded in March 1955, and 70 AA Bde was placed in 'suspended animation' from 31 October that year. It was formally disbanded on 31 December 1957.

== Commanders ==
- Brigadier Gerald Rickards, DSO, MC, appointed 22 October 1938
- Brigadier Erroll Tremlett, appointed 15 November 1940
- Brigadier R.E. Kane, OBE, MC, appointed 26 February 1942
- Brigadier J.W. Barker, TD, appointed 14 January 1944
- Brigadier Vere Krohn, MC, TD, appointed 2 May 1944
- Brigadier G.A. Appleton, OBE, by September 1944

== See also ==
- Film of Home Guard loading and firing 'Z' battery twin rocket launchers

== External sources ==
- Royal Artillery 1939–1945
- British Military History
- Orders of Battle at Patriot Files
- British Army units from 1945 on
- Graham Watson, The Territorial Army 1947
