= 76th Anti-Aircraft Brigade (United Kingdom) =

- Active: 1 December 1942–15 April 1946
- Country: United Kingdom
- Branch: British Army
- Type: Anti-Aircraft Brigade
- Role: Air Defence
- Part of: 21st Army Group
- Engagements: D-Day; Normandy campaign Defence of Antwerp

Commanders
- Notable commanders: Brig E.R. Benson

The 76th Anti-Aircraft Brigade (76th AA Bde) was an air defence formation of the British Army during the Second World War. It landed on D-Day and saw action throughout the campaign in North West Europe. Its guns operated in both anti-aircraft (AA) and ground roles in clearing and then defending the Scheldt Estuary until the end of the war.

== Origin ==
76th AA Brigade was formed on 1 December 1942 at Cradock Lines, South Camp, Blandford in Dorset, under the command of Brigadier Edward Riou Benson (1903–85). Within a month the Headquarters (HQ) staff had joined and the brigade had taken command of its first units.

At the end of February, 76th AA Bde was formally mobilised, with the following composition:

- 103rd Heavy AA (HAA) Regiment
- 104th HAA Rgt
- 73rd Light AA (LAA) Rgt.
- 75th (Middlesex) LAA Rgt.
- 'Z' Mobile Gun Operations Room
- 76 AA Bde Signals, Royal Corps of Signals

When 80th AA Bde was formed at Blandford camp in April 1943, 103rd HAA and 73rd LAA Rgts transferred to its command and were replaced in 76th AA Bde by the following units:

- 1st HAA Rgt
- 31st LAA Rgt.

== Training ==
76th AA Brigade did not form part of Anti-Aircraft Command but came directly under General Headquarters, Home Forces. Its units were under training for service overseas, though in February 1943, 233 Battery of 75th LAA Rgt was lent to AA Command's 72nd AA Bde on the Isle of Wight which required more LAA guns to deal with Luftwaffe 'hit and run' attacks. After attending practice camps in various part of the UK, all four regiments left for service in the Mediterranean theatre.

On 1 June, Brigade HQ moved to Peover Hall at Knutsford in Cheshire where the following units came under its command at nearby Toft Hall Camp:

- 112th HAA Rgt
- 113th HAA Rgt
- 19th LAA Rgt
- 120th LAA Rgt
- 125th (Cameronians) LAA Rgt
- 557th Independent Searchlight Battery
- 1st, 2nd, 3rd, 4th, 5th and 6th Composite LAA/Searchlight Batteries
- 151 and 152 AAORs
- 76 AA Bde Signals

The brigade was earmarked for the planned invasion of Normandy (Operation Overlord). During the summer months, it took part in various exercises on the South Coast of England, including practices with landing craft. In the autumn, 19th LAA Rgt and the composite LAA/SL batteries left the brigade to go to other formations, but 12th HAA Rgt joined.

In January 1944, 76th AA Brigade was placed under the command of the other British AA formation designated to accompany the initial Normandy landings, 80th AA Bde (Brigadier H.W. Deacon), an arrangement that lasted until after D-Day. 76th AA Brigade HQ moved to Thorpe Bay in Essex and intensive training by units continued at firing camps and exercises around the country. By now the brigade had been joined by Royal Army Service Corps (RASC) lorries to provide mobility:

- 323rd Company, RASC
  - 1617 LAA Rgt Platoon assigned to 125th LAA Rgt
  - 1618 LAA Rgt Platoon assigned to 120th LAA Rgt
  - 1651 HAA Rgt Platoon assigned to 112th HAA Rgt
  - 1652 HAA Rgt Platoon assigned to 113th HAA Rgt

The brigade's order of battle continued to expand in preparation for D-Day: 99th (London Welsh) and 146th HAA Rgts, 127th (Queen's) LAA Rgt, 62nd Battery of 20th LAA Rgt and 356th Independent S/L Bty all joined in April. Not all of these units would land in the early stages of the campaign.

In May, those units required for the assault phase of Overlord began to gather in southern England. Apart from 120th LAA Rgt at Southampton, the whole brigade concentrated at Southend-on-Sea.

== D-Day ==
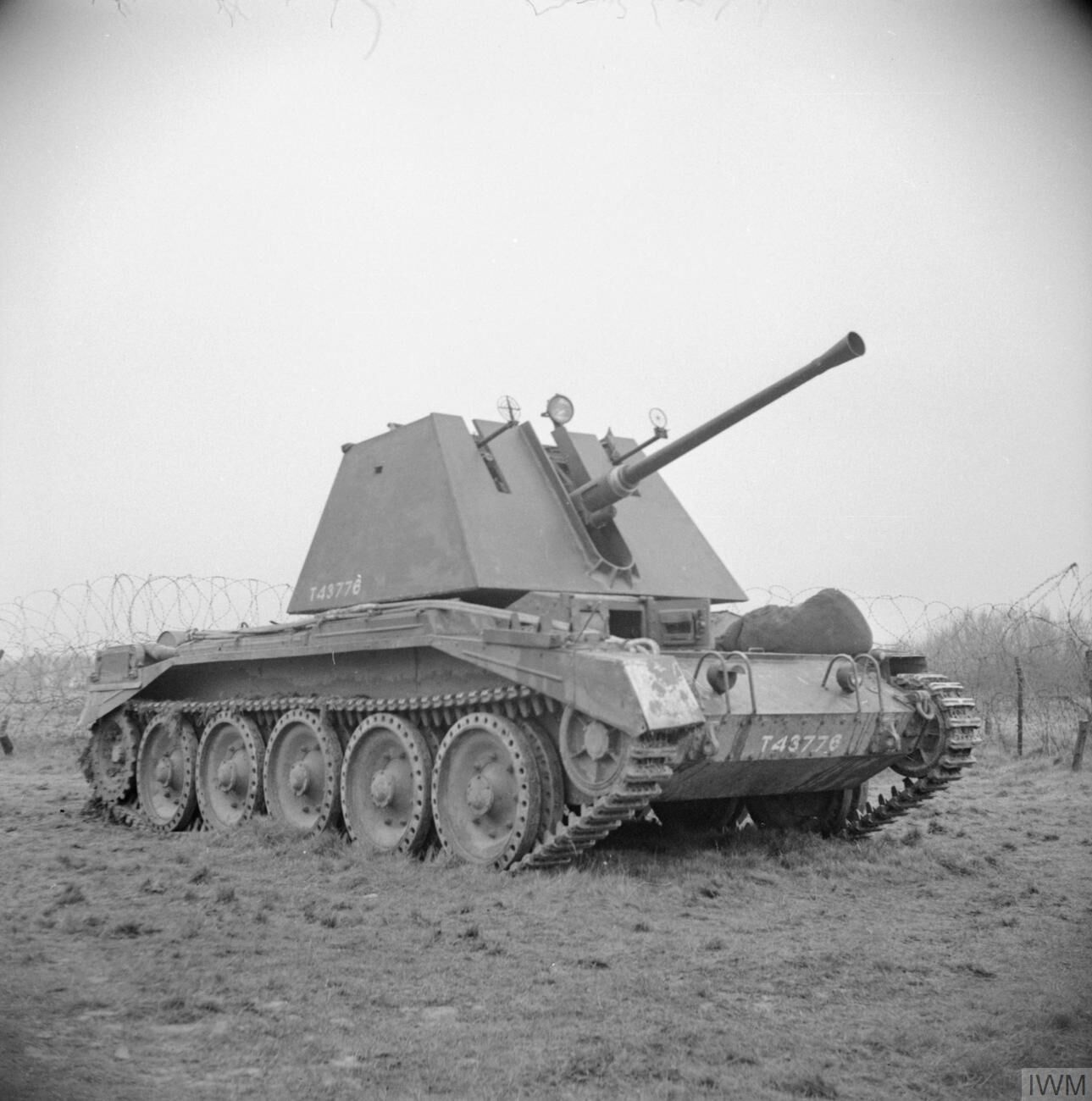
Crusader AA tank mounting 40 mm Bofors gun.

In Second Army's plan for Overlord, 76th AA Bde was to support XXX Corps in its landing on Gold Beach. Light AA (LAA) defence was emphasised at the start of the operation, since low-level attack by Luftwaffe aircraft was considered the most likely threat. Assault units were to be landed with minimum scales of equipment, to be brought up to strength by parties landing later. As well as the towed Bofors 40 mm guns of the standard LAA regiments, a battery of 93rd LAA Regiment was attached to the brigade for this phase, equipped with triple 20 mm Polsten guns, half of them self-propelled (SP), mounted on Crusader tank chassis.

The order of battle of 76th AA Bde for the assault phase on D-Day, under 50th (Northumbrian) Infantry Division on Gold Beach, was as follows:

- Regimental HQ (RHQ) 113th HAA Rgt (Lt-Col F.R. Gilbert)
- 320/93rd LAA Bty
- RHQ 120th LAA Rgt
  - 394/120th & 395/120th Btys
- A Troop, 356th Independent S/L Bty
- 152 AAOR

Meanwhile, five AA barges were standing off Gold Beach to defend the anchorage, manned by a battery from 139th LAA Rgt attached from 80th AA Bde. Also attached from 80th AA Bde to land shortly on Gold Beach were 373 Bty and one Trp of 372 Bty of 114th LAA Rgt, with 24 SP Bofors guns mounted on Crusader tank chassis, Barrage balloon parties, and detachments from 112 Company Pioneer Corps equipped with smoke generators.

By nightfall on D-Day, 76th AA Bde planned to have put ashore:

- 12 x 3.7-inch HAA guns
- 30 x 40mm Bofors
- 12 x 20mm
- 6 x S/L

In practice, this proved too ambitious. Nevertheless, 394/120th and 320/93rd LAA Btys landed their 40mm and 20mm guns in the first 90 minutes without too much difficulty, although a Bofors gun was lost when its LCT hit a mine. RHQ of 113th HAA Rgt landed on the next tide and set up the tactical HQ, but none of its own guns appeared. While awaiting their guns, the remainder of 120th LAA Rgt acted as infantry, clearing enemy positions. Brigadier Benson and his staff landed from two LSTs at Le Hamel near Asnelles at 18.00 and established their Tactical HQ at Buholt at 22.30. By midnight the commanding officers of 113th HAA and 120th LAA Rgts had landed, while 394/120th and 320/93rd LAA Btys had landed 8 x Bofors and 6 x 20mm guns in King Sector and 9 x Bofors and 2 x 20mm in Jig Sector. A reconnaissance party from 112 Pioneer Company had arrived, but no HAA guns, searchlights or balloons had been landed. Three enemy aircraft were destroyed by the LAA guns during the night, two at dusk and one at dawn.

== Normandy ==
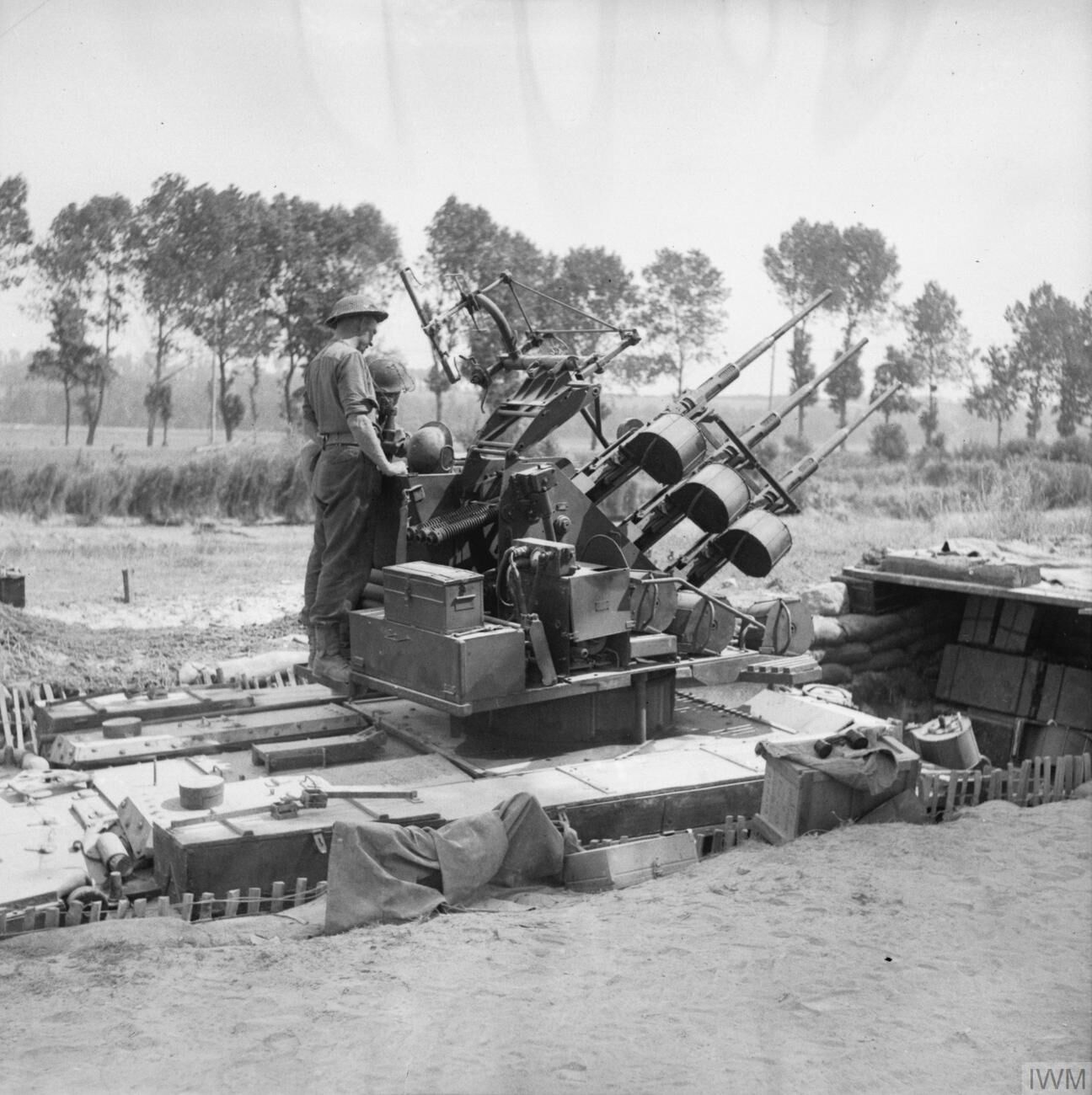
Crusader AA tank mounting a triple 20mm gun in a hull-down position, 19 July 1944

Landings continued the next day (D+1) and by nightfall there were 19 Bofors and 10 x 20mm ashore, together with 20 HAA guns (the other four having been damaged in landing), which engaged an air raid that night, two aircraft being destroyed. Once the AA defences of Gold Beach were in place, 76th AA Bde's main task became the protection of the artificial Mulberry harbour being assembled nearby at Arromanches-les-Bains. The defences planned for Mulberry B were:

- HQ AA ship HMS Despatch – 16 x 40mm (127th LAA Rgt)
- 34 Phoenix caissons – 34 x 40mm (127th LAA Rgt)
- 3 Corncob blockships – 4 x 40mm (127th LAA Rgt)
- 15 AA barges – 30 x 40mm (139th LAA Rgt)
- Mulberry piers – 36 x 20mm (320/93rd LAA Bty)

(Several of these guns and crews had to be evacuated onto land after the storm of 19/20 June.)

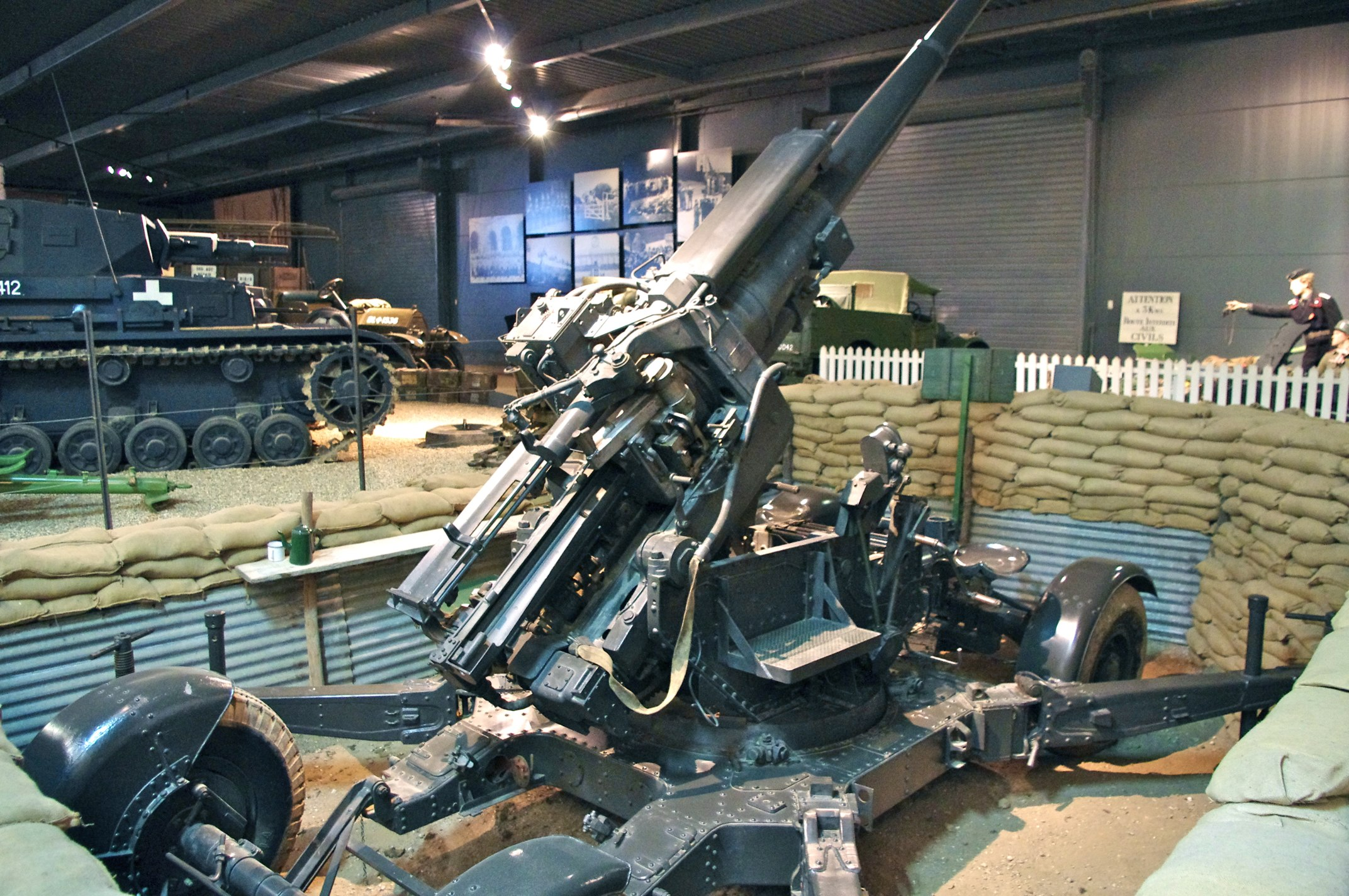
3.7 inch HAA gun preserved at Imperial War Museum, Duxford. Used in HAA and medium roles in Normandy.

In addition, one battery of 113th HAA Rgt was made available to XXX Corps' medium artillery to fire on ground targets. By D+15, 99th and 146th HAA Rgts had arrived to strengthen the AA defences of Mulberry B and the important oil installations at Port-en-Bessin and to provide further ground fire. At Port-en-Bessin, 146th HAA and 139th LAA Rgts were in action for 33 consecutive nights against high- and low-level bombing, employing visual, radar and barrage methods. The HAA guns here fired 5563 rounds, scoring 11 'kills'. A subsidiary task for 112th and 146th HAA Rgts was to establish radar stations on the cliffs above Arromanches and Port-en-Bessin to track Luftwaffe minelaying aircraft and the fall of the Parachute mines so that they could be cleared by the Royal Navy. Elsewhere across 76th AA Bde's area, Luftwaffe attacks were small and scattered, but the AA sites themselves were often the targets. Otherwise, firing by the brigade's units was generally in the medium artillery role. Searchlights began to be used to provide 'artificial moonlight' for tanks moving at night.

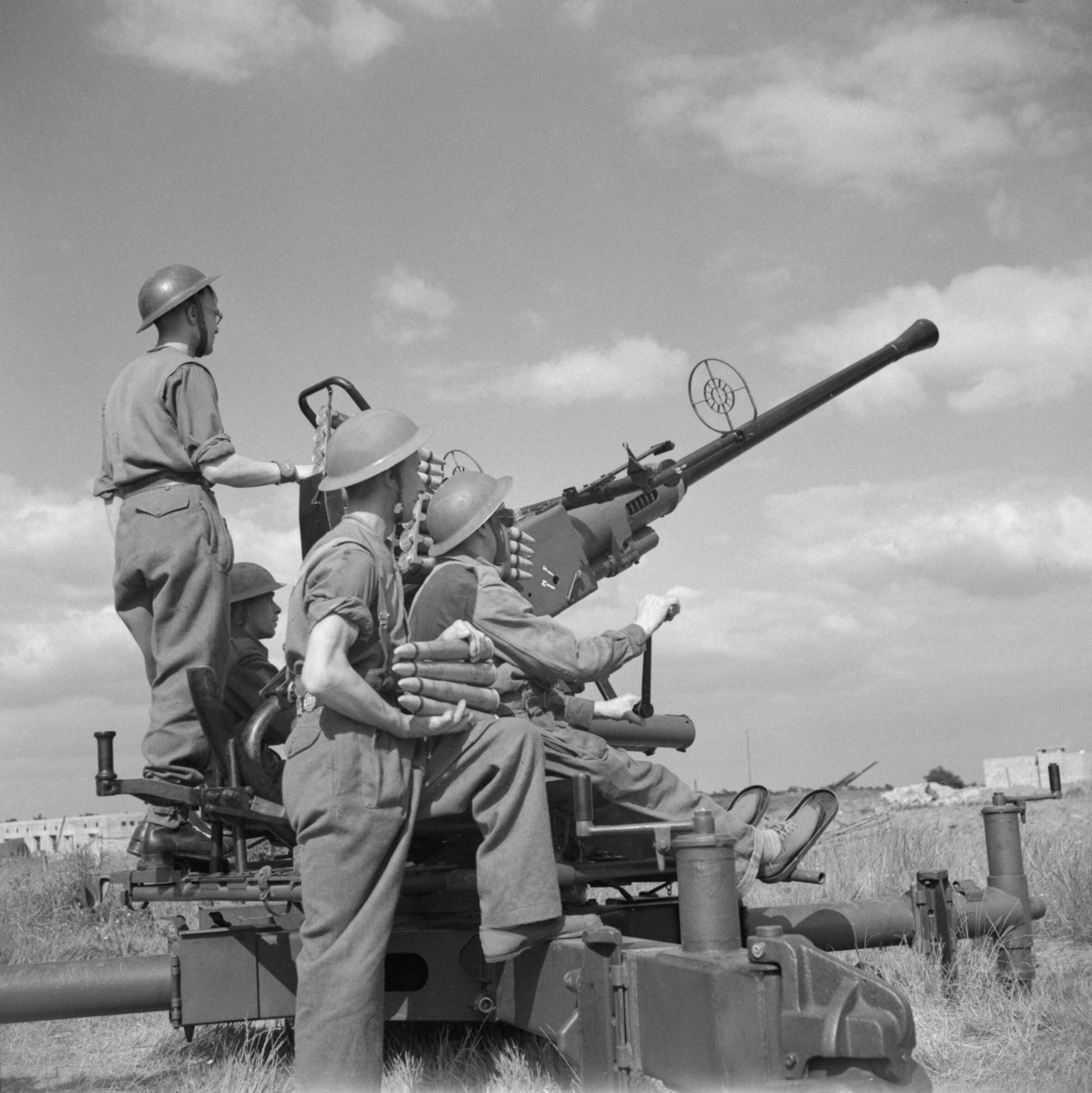
Bofors gun and crew, summer 1944

Between 15 and 25 June, 76th AA Bde attained its full strength in Normandy:

- 76th Bde HQ at Buhot
- 99th HAA Rgt (302, 303, 318 HAA Btys)
- 112th HAA Rgt (352, 353, 380 HAA Btys)
- 113th HAA Rgt (362, 366, 391 HAA Btys)
- 146th HAA Rgt (176, 414, 465 HAA Btys)
- 120th LAA Rgt (393, 394, 395 LAA Btys)
- 125th LAA Rgt (417, 418, 419 LAA Btys)
- 127th LAA Rgt (416, 439, 440 LAA Btys)
- 62/20th LAA Bty
- 320/93rd LAA Bty (returned to 80th AA Bde late July)
- 373/114th LAA Bty (returned to 80th AA Bde mid August)
- 356th Ind S/L Bty
- 152 & 160 AAORs
- 806, 810 Smoke Coys & A Group 112 Coy, Pioneer Corps
- 980, 991 Beach Balloon & 104 Port Balloon units

(323 Coy RASC did not land until late July)

== Breakout ==
After 21st Army Group finally broke out of its beachhead in August 1944, 76th AA Bde was relieved of its responsibilities on the coast by 105th AA Bde on 1 September and was made available to support the advance. 99th HAA and 109th LAA Rgts were sent to defend Cherbourg Naval Base and were relieved by 121st HAA Rgt from the UK. 76th AA Brigade was earmarked for the defence of Rouen, but the early capture of Dieppe by First Canadian Army led to the brigade being deployed there, at Amiens, and along the River Somme.

By 11 September the armies were advancing so rapidly that 76th AA Bde gave up Dieppe and concentrated at Amiens under orders to prepare for the AA defence of the vital port of Antwerp once that was in Allied hands. In the interim the brigade took over AA and coast defence duties at Boulogne on 23 September. Next day, 362/113th HAA Bty came under fire from German 88 mm guns at Cap Gris Nez, and for two days the battery replied until the target was observed to be damaged.

== Antwerp ==
The headlong advance ended with the failure of Operation Market Garden at Arnhem, and emphasis shifted to bringing the port of Antwerp into use as a supply base. The planners envisaged a large Gun Defence Area (GDA) to deal not only with conventional air raids but also the threat of V-1 flying bombs (codenamed 'Divers').

76th AA Brigade's move to Antwerp finally occurred in mid-October, the brigade being relieved by 80th AA Bde at Boulogne, while 125th LAA Rgt and 1617th Platoon RASC temporarily left to join 107th AA Bde in the Siege of Dunkirk. 76th AA Brigade's intended deployment area was still in enemy hands, so 112th and 113th HAA Rgts operated in the ground role supporting II Canadian Corps in clearing the south side of the Scheldt Estuary (the Battle of the Scheldt), with the Canadian gun lines protected by 120th LAA Rgt and 557th S/L Bty. When the brigade had overcome flooding and minefields to take up its positions on the islands of Walcheren and South Beveland, its guns engaged German units escaping by boat from Walcheren, and supported 4th Commando Brigade's continuing operations on North Beveland.

Once secure, the GDA covering the whole area of Antwerp and the estuary was established, with 76th AA Bde responsible for the Scheldt North zone. HAA positions were established at intervals of 4–5000 yards along the waterway, interspersed with irregularly sited LAA positions. 2nd S/L Rgt arrived direct from England with the primary task of cooperating with the LAA guns against mine-laying in the channel. The brigade also formed a local warning radar troop from its own resources. By December, the brigade had the following units under command:

- 98th HAA Rgt (joined 16/17 November)
- 112th HAA Rgt
- 113th HAA Rgt
- 120th LAA Rgt
- 124th (Highland) LAA Rgt (joined 16/17 November)
- 125th LAA Rgt
- 2nd S/L Rgt (joined 17 November)
- 152 AAOR
- No 1 Local Warning (Radar) Trp (formed 27 November)
- 323 Artillery Coy RASC (1506, 1540, 1617, 1618, 1651 & 1652 Artillery Platoons)

On 19 December, 98th HAA Rgt was transferred to the US 50th AA Artillery Brigade to assist in the 'Diver' defence belt, and the rest of the North Scheldt guns had to be redeployed to fill the gap. The only enemy aircraft seen in this period were on reconnaissance missions, usually flying very high, but on 8 December the brigade scored its first 'kill' since arriving in the area, when A Trp of 362/113th HAA Bty destroyed a Junkers Ju 188 picked up on radar and then illuminated by searchlight. When the German Army launched its Ardennes offensive (the Battle of the Bulge) aimed at breaking through to Antwerp, 76th AA Bde was ordered to take precautions against possible attacks by German airborne troops, as well as dealing with increased air activity at night.

On 1 January 1945, the Luftwaffe launched Operation Bodenplatte: daylight attacks against Allied airfields in support of the Ardennes offensive. Between 09.20 and 09.54 some 50–60 enemy aircraft, mainly Messerschmitt Bf 109 and Focke-Wulf Fw 190, came over 76th AA Bde's area. Its war diary records: 'This was the best day since our formation', with 15 aircraft claimed as 'certainly destroyed' and others probably crashed in enemy territory.

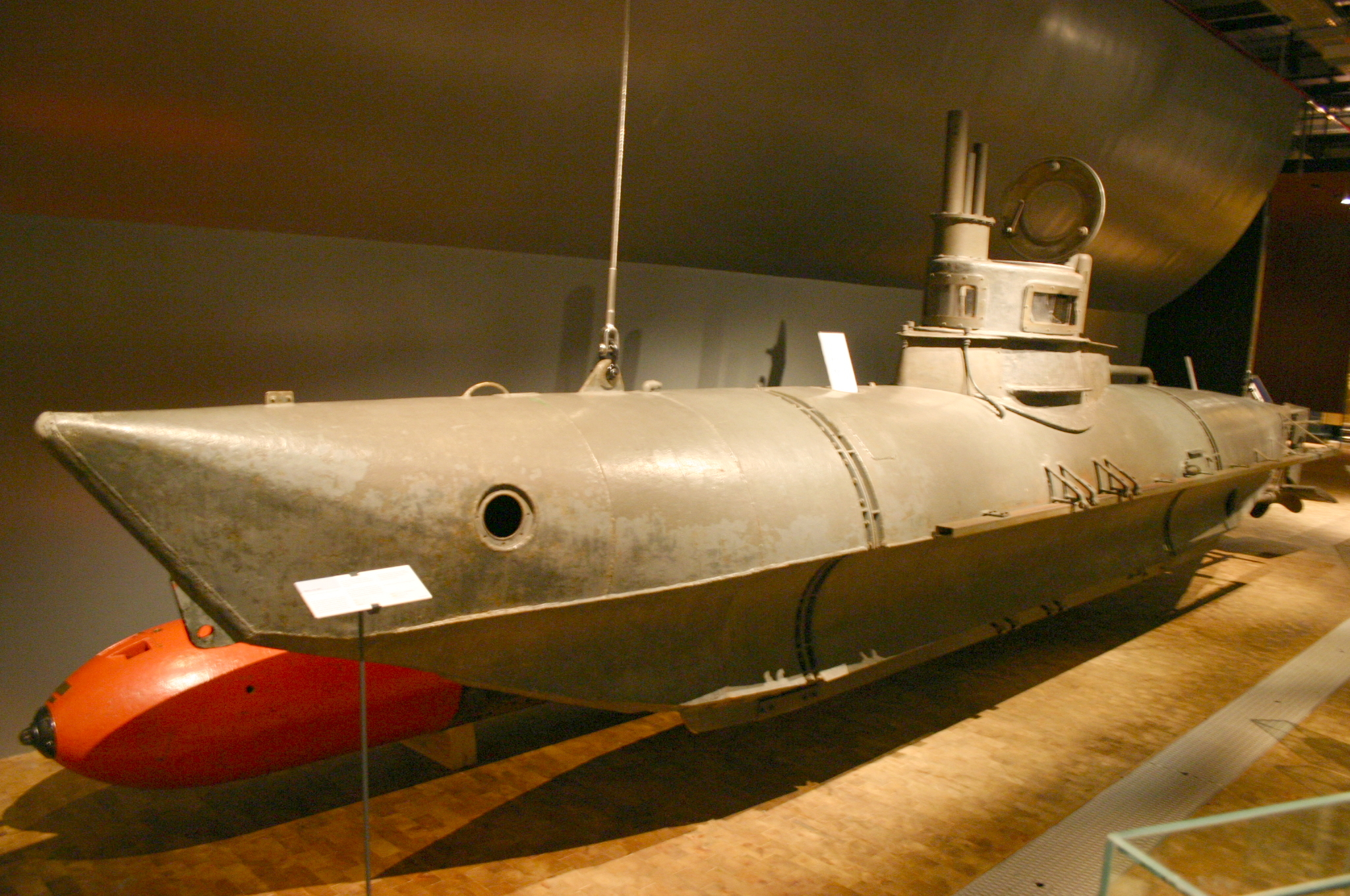
Biber midget submarine preserved at Deutsches Technik Museum Berlin.

After that, enemy air activity was sparse, but on 9 January, four Bofors of 411/124th LAA Bty hit and sank a German Biber midget submarine operating off South Beveland. Two others were destroyed later, one by Bofors, one by 3.7-inch guns of 113th HAA Rgt, together with a manned torpedo. In mid-February, 76th AA Bde HQ took over local administration of the Scheldt islands from 4th Commando Bde. Apart from coastal defence and occasional ground fire tasks, particularly against enemy positions on Schouwen, much of the early part of 1945 was taken up with unit training to use the new SCR-584 radar and No 10 Predictors (the all-electric Bell Labs AAA Computer) for HAA guns, and new No 2 Mark VIII searchlight control (SLC) radar. The brigade also cooperated with the Royal Navy, using GL Mk III gunlaying radar to direct landing craft making a raid on Schouwen on the night of 11/12 March. In March and April, the brigade lent a platoon of its AEC Matador HAA gun tractors to 21st Army Group to assist in transporting engineering stores for the assault crossing of the Rhine (Operation Plunder). This included towing Bren carriers full of stores, and heavy sledges normally moved by Armoured Vehicle Royal Engineers.

As the war in Europe drew to its close, AA commitments in rear areas were reduced and units closed up to the Scheldt, where they were either sent forward into Germany (as AA or occupation troops) or prepared for disbandment. 113th and 146th HAA Regiments, 114th and 139th LAA Regts were all disbanded in April 1945, 98th HAA Rgt was converted into garrison troops, and 103rd HAA Rgt was converted into a driver training regiment. 76th AA Bde's order of battle in the final weeks of the war was as follows:

- 86th (Honourable Artillery Company) HAA Rgt
- 99th HAA Rgt
- 120th LAA Rgt
- 411/124th LAA Bty
- 125th LAA Rgt
- 1st S/L Rgt (less one bty)

On 9 April 1945 Brig Benson left to become Commander RA (CRA) for 52nd (Lowland) Division and was replaced by Brig E.J.C. Chaytor, and later by Brig J.C. Friedberger, former CRA of 53rd (Welsh) Division.

The brigade was ordered to cease fire on 3 May 1945 when a local truce came into effect to allow supplies to be sent to civilians in enemy-occupied Holland (Operation Manna). This was followed on 4 May by the German surrender at Lüneburg Heath and the end of the war in Europe (VE Day).

== Occupation duties ==
After VE Day, the brigade remained temporarily on its AA tasks. Its units then returned to the mainland from the Scheldt islands and concentrated north of Antwerp before moving into Germany in June to garrison the Dortmund–Bochum area under I Corps. The units under command during this period were:

- 112th HAA Rgt
- 120th LAA Rgt
- 124th LAA Rgt
- 125th LAA Rgt
- 1st S/L Rgt
- 51st (Midland) Medium Rgt

By October the brigade had established its HQ at Burgsteinfurt Schloss under the command of 52nd (L) Division. As well as guarding vital points, it was responsible for camps containing 6000 disarmed former Wehrmacht soldiers and 9000 displaced persons (DPs).

As the year progressed, units were progressively disbanded as the troops were demobilised. 112th HAA Regiment went in October, and 120th LAA Rgt in January 1946. 26th LAA Rgt joined briefly from the Italian theatre, but this Territorial Army (TA) unit was placed in suspended animation in February together with 125th LAA. Brigade HQ (and 51st Medium Rgt) completed their disbandment in the first two weeks of April 1946. Its remaining unit, 124th LAA Rgt, stayed on as part of British Army of the Rhine, but was placed in suspended animation later in the year.

== Postwar ==
In 1947, a new 76 AA Brigade was formed in the TA. However, this was unconnected with the wartime formation of the same number; instead it was formed by reconstituting the TA's former 50 Light AA Bde at Leicester. It was disbanded in November 1950.

== External sources ==
- British Army units from 1945 on (archive site)
- Generals of World War II
- Graham Watson, The Territorial Army 1947
