= 86th (Honourable Artillery Company) Heavy Anti-Aircraft Regiment, Royal Artillery =

86th (HAC) HAA Regiment, RA 2nd Regiment, HAC (HAA)
- Active: 1 April 1939–10 March 1955
- Country: United Kingdom
- Branch: Territorial Army
- Role: Air Defence
- Size: Regiment
- Part of: 1st AA Division; 80th AA Brigade
- Garrison/HQ: Armoury House, Finsbury
- Engagements: The Blitz; D-Day; Operation Astonia; Defence of Antwerp and Brussels

The 86th (Honourable Artillery Company) Heavy Anti-Aircraft Regiment (86th (HAC) HAA Rgt) was an air defence unit of Britain's Territorial Army (TA) that served throughout World War II. It defended London during The Blitz, landed on Juno Beach on D-Day, and defended the cities of Belgium against V-1 flying bombs.

== Origin ==
See main article Honourable Artillery Company

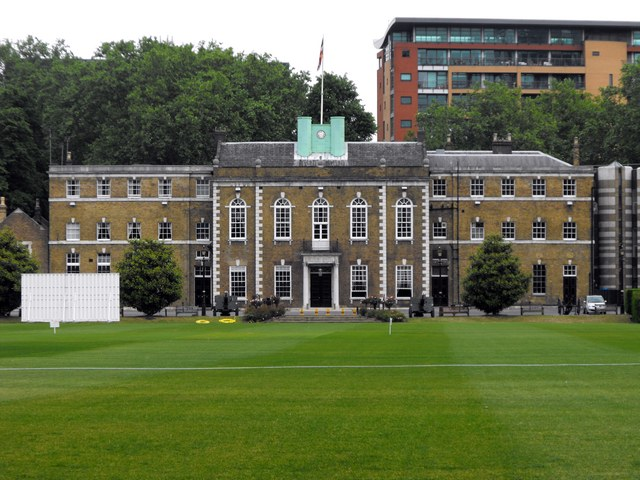
Armoury House

The Honourable Artillery Company (HAC) of London is the senior regiment of the British Army's Reserve Forces, with a history dating back to 1537. Between the two World Wars, it provided a TA unit of the Royal Horse Artillery. With the expansion of the TA after the 1938 Munich Crisis, the HAC formed several new units, including 86th (HAC) Anti-Aircraft Regiment ('Heavy' was only added to titles on 1 June 1940 to distinguish Heavy Anti-Aircraft (HAA) units from the new Light AA (LAA) units being formed). It was formally raised on 1 April 1939 at the HAC's Headquarters at Armoury House, Finsbury.

The new regiment comprised Regimental Headquarters (RHQ) with 273, 274 and 275 HAA Batteries, forming part of 26th (London) Anti-Aircraft Brigade in 1st Anti-Aircraft Division of Anti-Aircraft Command.

== Mobilisation ==
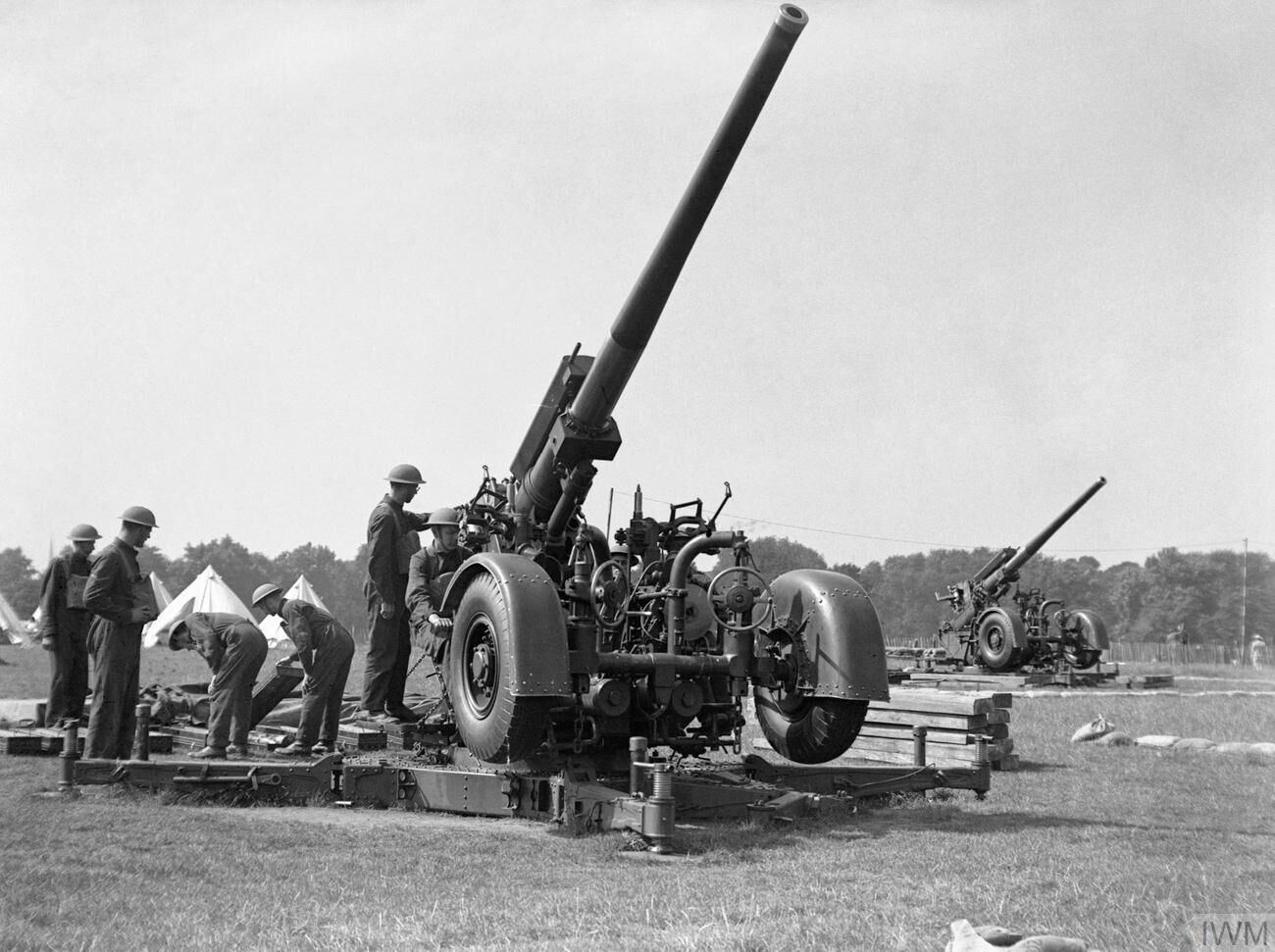
Mobile 3.7-inch HAA guns in Hyde Park, 1939.

In June 1939, as the international situation worsened, a partial mobilisation of the TA was begun in a process known as 'couverture', whereby each AA unit did a month's tour of duty in rotation to man selected AA gun and searchlight positions. On 19 August, 86th (HAC) Rgt took its turn, manning AA gun sites in the London Inner Artillery Zone (IAZ), with 273 Bty at the Burnt Farm and Asylum sites at Finsbury Park, 274 Bty at Hyde Park and Southwark Park, and 275 Bty at Bostall Heath, Brockley and Hayes, Kent. The regiment was thus fully deployed when AA Command was fully mobilised on 24 August, ahead of the declaration of war on 3 September.

== Phoney War ==
Once war was declared, the regiment handed back its gunsites to the units that normally manned them, and began double manning them as relief crews. RHQ moved to Eton Manor Sports Ground, and then to the Manor House at High Beech, Loughton. Several regiments from 26th AA Bde were sent to France as part of the British Expeditionary Force, taking their modern 3.7-inch AA guns with them, leaving 86th (HAC) to man their sites with obsolete 3-inch AA guns, or even old Lewis guns in a light AA (LAA) role. By October, the regiment was deployed with 273 Bty at Chadwell Heath and Burnt Farm (4 x 3-inch guns at each), 275 Bty at the Asylum site (4 x 3-inch guns), while 274 Bty under 38th LAA Brigade was defending the Handley Page aircraft factory at Radlett and Fairey aircraft factory at Hayes, Middlesex with 20 Lewis guns at each. The latter vulnerable points (VPs) were later handed over to specialist LAA units. The batteries moved around during the winter of 1939–40 as further gunsites of the London Inner Artillery Zone (IAZ) were established, but the regiment broadly remained covering the northern and eastern approaches to London.

The original personnel of the regiment and its recruits were of high quality and many of the other ranks (ORs) were selected for officer training (over 800 by September 1940, and 1,178 by the end of the war). Large numbers of young soldiers were transferred in from other RA regiments that were joining the BEF, but unusually, from November 1939, 86th (HAC) was permitted to recruit volunteers directly into the regiment, as well as receiving drafts from the RA training regiments. By July 1940, 274 Bty was running a training camp for 250 recruits at a time. It formed and trained 128 AA Z Battery in September 1940, and in November the camp commandant, Captain Geoffrey Champness, was sent to the AA training regiments at Arborfield Garrison with a cadre of experienced officers and ORs to form a new 383 HAA Bty, which joined 86th (HAC) in February 1941.

302 HAA Bty was attached from 99th (London Welsh) HAA Rgt in the spring of 1940, allowing 86th (HAC)'s batteries to attend practice camps in other parts of the country. RHQ moved to Bush Hill Park Golf Club at Enfield in May and Lieutenant-Colonel Basil Trappes-Lomax, MC, took command of the regiment. He left in November on promotion, and was replaced by Lt-Col John Ross.

== The Blitz ==
During the summer of 1940, the Battle of Britain was raging over Southern England, and 273 Bty fired the regiment's first shots at a hostile aircraft on 22 August. 275 Bty scored a confirmed 'kill' on the night of 9/10 September. In November, four ORs of the regiment were wounded when an unexploded AA shell fell into their gun pit.

By now, the night-time Blitz over London was at its height, with the London IAZ in action every night. AA Command decided to move guns out of the centre of the IAZ to thicken up the defences of the approaches. 86th (HAC) Rgt, still operating in 26th AA Bde, was given four 8-gun sites to control, with a battery temporarily brought in from another regiment to reinforce its own batteries – first 171 HAA Bty from 61st (Middlesex) HAA Rgt and then 157 HAA Bty from 53rd (City of London) HAA Rgt. 341 HAA Battery joined the regiment from 108th HAA Rgt on 16 December, but it left for 116th HAA Rgt on 4 January 1941. The regiment supplied a Cadre of experienced officers and other ranks to provide the basis for 383 HAA Bty formed on 14 November 1940 by 206th HAA Training Rgt at Arborfield; this was regimented with 86th (HAC) HAA Rgt on 8 February 1941.

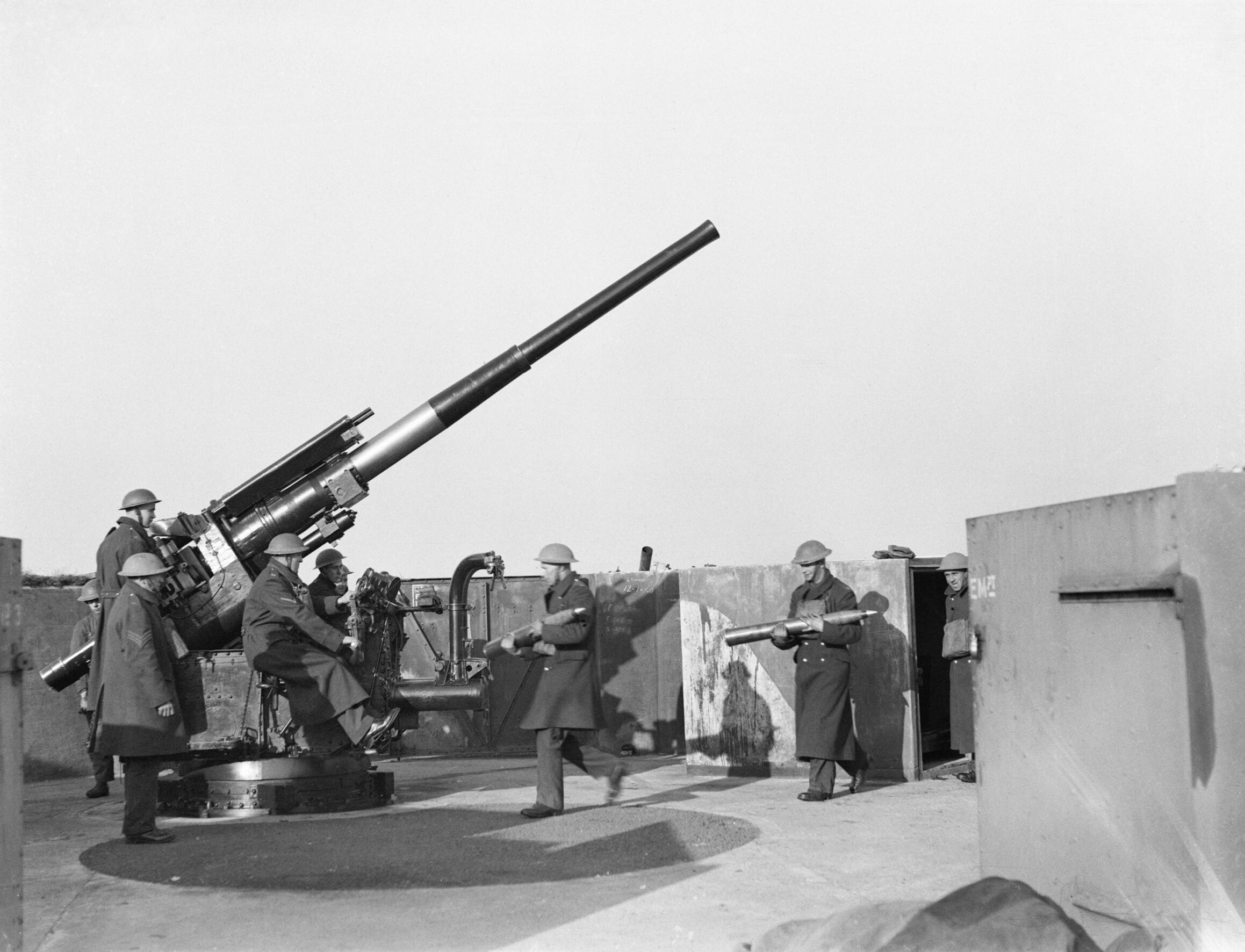
4.5-inch HAA gun on static mounting.

By March 1941, the static 3.7-inch guns at several of the regiment's sites were being converted to mobile equipment, and one of the 8-gun sites was equipped with 4.5-inch guns. On 20 April, a so-called Land mine landed near one of the regiment's gunsites, killing one man and injuring nine.

The Blitz effectively ended in May 1941. There was no general air raid alarm over London between 27/28 July and November that year. In June, the second-in-command, Major A. Mills, went with another cadre and began to form 446 HAA Bty at 207th HAA Training Regt, Devizes. The new battery joined 86th (HAC) Rgt on 19 September, when 275 Bty left the regiment to join 118th HAA Rgt in Wales. In November, 86th (HAC) sent another cadre to 206th HAA Training Regt at Arborfield, where it was joined by an intake of soldiers from 225 and 233 LAA Troops, which had been formed in August 1939 for airfield defence and were now being disbanded. On 17 December 1941, they formed 499 (Mixed) HAA Bty for 141st (Mixed) HAA Rgt – 'Mixed' indicating that the unit's operational personnel included women of the Auxiliary Territorial Service (ATS). All of AA Command's regiments had ATS detachments in administrative roles. A further cadre formed 532 (M) HAA Bty on 12 February 1942 at 207th HAA Training Rgt, Arborfield, which joined 156th (Mixed) HAA Rgt.

== Mobile training ==
On 3 January 1942, the regiment was placed on the Army Troops Reserve Roster, indicating that while remaining in AA Command it would begin training for a future mobile role in the field force. It was relieved from its sites east of London under 26th AA Bde and moved to 49th AA Bde west of London, taking over mobile 3.7-inch gun sites at Cobham and Old Woking (274 Bty), Weybridge and Weston Green (446 Bty), all in Surrey, West Drayton in Middlesex (383 Bty), and Datchet and Dorney in Buckinghamshire (273 Bty). RHQ moved from Wanstead, where it had been since the previous summer, to Cobham and later Datchett, and the last of the ATS staff left RHQ. Major Mills left to become CO of a Mixed HAA regiment, and Maj Champness became 2iC.

In February, over 200 drivers were posted to the unit for its mobile role, together with the first of the additional vehicles required, and in March the gun crews practised anti-tank shooting with 3.7-inch HAA guns at Okehampton ranges. On 15 April, Lt-Col Ross was promoted to command a brigade and Maj Champness was promoted to take over. Geoffrey Harold Champness had first been commissioned into the HAC (infantry battalion) in 1934.

In mid-May, the regiment was relieved from its gunsites and moved to Eastleigh, where it came under 11th AA Bde for a month's mobile training, after which it returned to 49th AA Bde. 446 HAA Battery left the regiment on 19 July 1942 to join 164th HAA Rgt, reducing 86th (HAC) HAA Rgt to the three-battery establishment for overseas service. The regiment continued its training, with a fortnight at Berechurch Camp, Colchester, for infantry training in July, and then moved to Scotland in October, under 6 AA Group. In between, the regiment occupied gunsites on the Essex coast for AA Command. While in Scotland, RHQ was established at Strathleven House, Dumbarton and then Langhouse, Inverkip.

On 1 December 1942, 86th (HAC) HAA Rgt was formally transferred from AA Command to Home Forces, and moved to Mushroom Farm Camp, Wethersfield, Essex. Until February, its batteries were loaned out to AA Command Gun Defence Areas (GDAs) at Norwich, Lincoln and York, which had been established during the Baedeker Blitz the previous year.

By now, the regiment consisted of RHQ and 273, 274 and 383 HAA Batteries, each equipped with 8 towed 3.7-inch guns in two troops of 4, with Gun-Laying (GL) radar. As a mobile regiment, it was joined by its own Royal Electrical and Mechanical Engineers (REME) workshop and Royal Corps of Signals detachment. It formally completed its mobilisation on 30 March 1943, when it became part of the Field Force.

After attending No 16 AA Practice Camp at Clacton-on-Sea, the regiment moved to Drake Lines at Blandford Camp in Dorset in May 1943 to join the recently formed 80th AA Brigade. This formation was assigned to Second Army for the planned invasion of Europe (Operation Overlord).

In the spring, the regiment's batteries attended sea target practice at Ramsgate, and it then moved its base to Barrhead, Renfrewshire, from where it attended 80th AA Bde training exercises simulating assault landings on a hostile shore. Towards the end of 1943, the regiment was stationed at Limpsfield in Surrey. By February 1944, 80th AA Bde HQ and 86th HAA Rgt had moved to Southampton, taking part in final exercises, and in April the regiment moved to its Overlord concentration area at Deane Park, Horsham, in West Sussex.

== D-Day ==
For the Normandy landings, 80th AA Brigade was assigned to support I Corps landing on Juno and Sword Beaches. The leading elements were to land with the assault waves on D-Day itself (6 June). Light AA defence was emphasised at the start of the operation, since low-level attack by Luftwaffe aircraft was considered the most likely threat. However, 86th HAA Rgt was one of the designated assault regiments to land on D-Day with minimum scales of equipment, to be brought up to strength by parties arriving later.

The leading units were formed into AA Assault Groups, and Lt-Col Champness with RHQ of 86th (HAC) Rgt took command of 'P' AA Assault Group landing on Nan Sector of Juno Beach under the command of 3rd Canadian Division. The assault group included elements of 73rd and 114th LAA Rgts equipped with towed and self-propelled (SP) 40 mm Bofors guns, and a troop of 93rd LAA Rgt equipped with the new 20 mm Polsten gun in triple mountings, half towed and half mounted on Crusader tank chassis.

P AA Assault Group

- 86th (HAC) HAA Rgt RHQ (Lt-Col G.H. Champness)
- 273/86 HAA Bty
- 383/86 HAA Bty less 1 Troop
- 375/114 LAA Bty
- 1 Troop 321/93 LAA Bty
- Detachment 112 Company Pioneer Corps (smoke generators)
- 86th HAA Rgt Workshop, REME

274/86 HAA Bty and one Troop of 383/86 HAA Bty were assigned to the neighbouring 'O' AA Assault Group, landing on Mike Sector of Juno Beach under RHQ of 114th LAA Rgt.

The AA units at Juno experienced serious problems in landing on 6 June, with heavy losses in landing craft and hard fire-fights going on to establish a firm beachhead. Batteries were badly split up, some detachments being separated from their guns. Early attempts to land HAA guns on the beaches led to damaged towing gear and none of the regiment's guns were successfully landed on D-Day. Luckily, German air attacks were few and sporadic, and the 3.7-inch guns began to land on D+1 before air attacks peaked on D+3.

== Normandy ==
Once the initial landings had been achieved, the AA Assault Groups were broken up and reorganised by regimental groups, the regimental commander being AA Defence Commander for the local area:

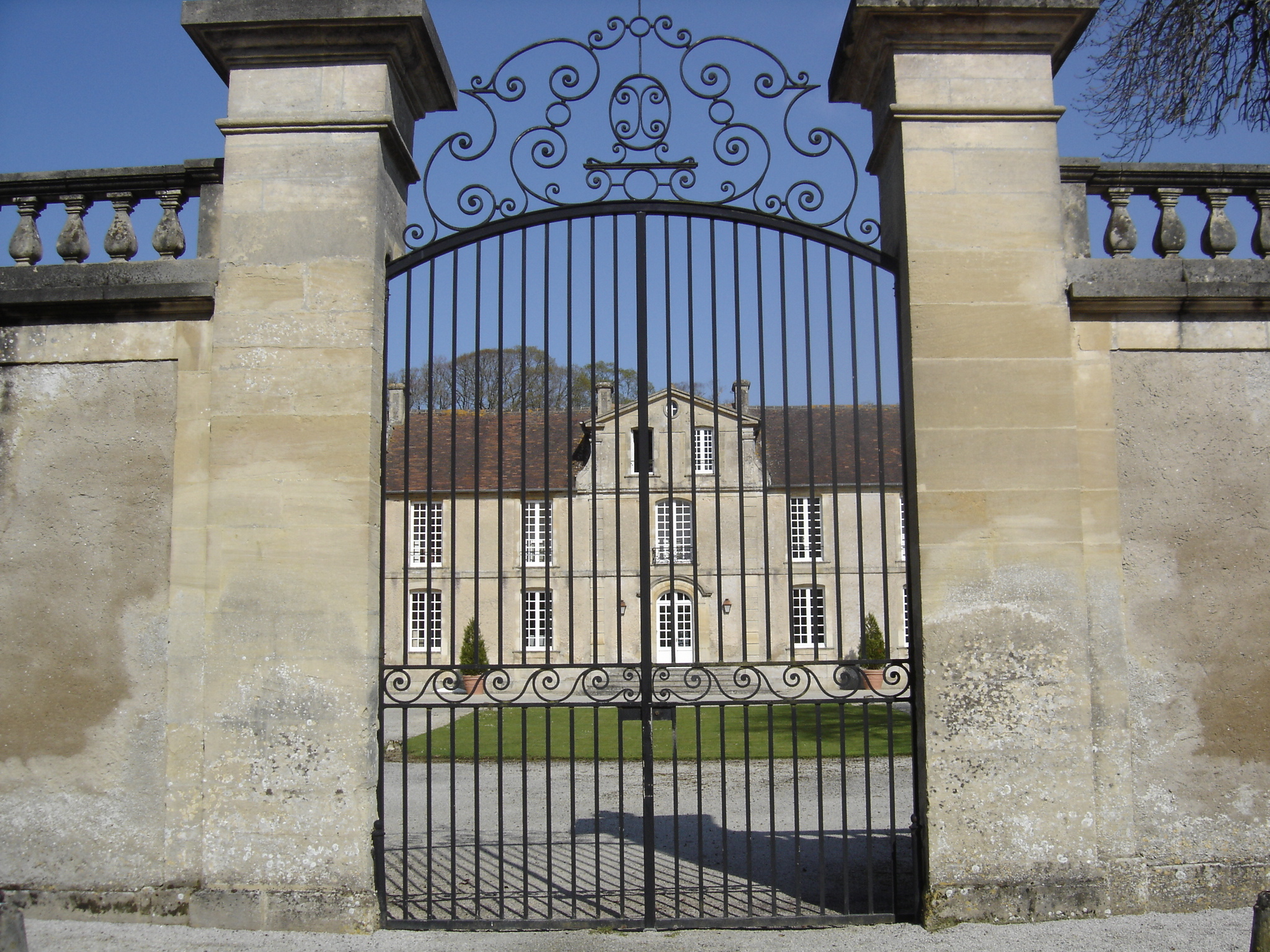
The Chateau at Bény-sur-Mer.

86 HAA Rgt Gp

- All units 86th HAA Rgt
- 155 AA Operations Room
- 474th Independent Searchlight Battery, less B & C Troops

On 8 June, 86th (HAC) HAA Regiment reported RHQ established at Bény-sur-Mer (soon moving into the outbuildings of the Chateau) and all its gunsites ready for action in defence of the beach maintenance area and shipping. It had suffered only a small number of casualties in the operation.

As the build-up in the Normandy beachhead grew during June and July 1944, 80th AA Bde was tasked with protecting Juno and Sword beaches, the small port of Ouistreham, and the Orne and Caen Canal bridges. 86th (HAC)'s guns were mainly in action at night. As well as the AA role, some firing was carried out on ground targets east of the canal. During August, the regiment regularly lent troops of 3.7-inch guns for ground firing near Caen, for example during the closing of the Falaise Pocket.

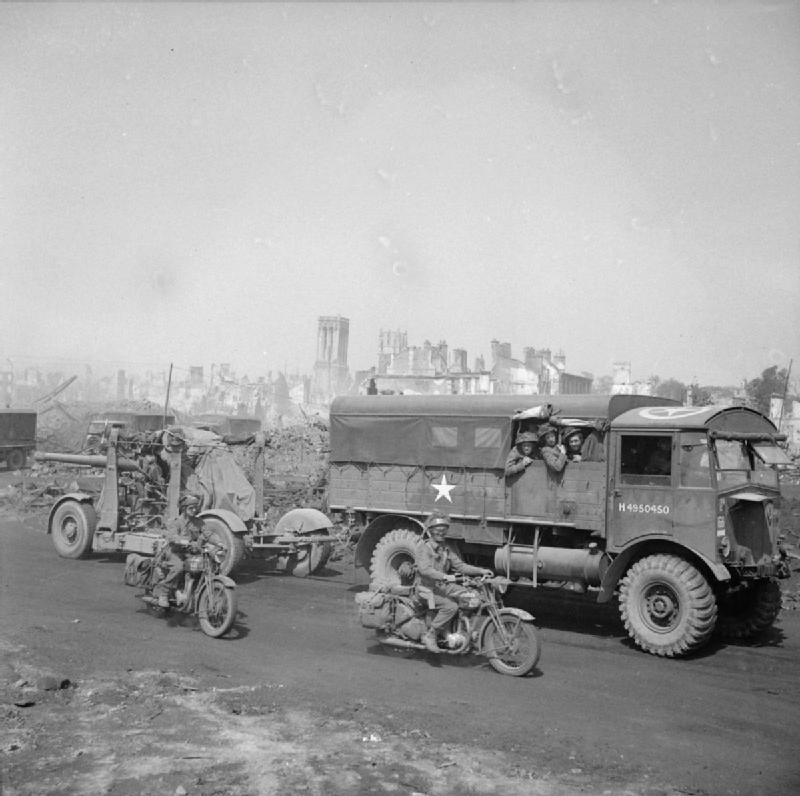
An AEC Matador gun tractor tows a 3.7-inch HAA gun through the ruins of Caen

== Breakout ==
When 21st Army Group finally broke out of the Normandy beachhead in August 1944, 86th (HAC) was at first left providing AA cover for the beaches, for Caen and the Canal. But, on 6 September, it moved forwards, 274 Bty to provide AA cover for the river crossings at Rouen, the rest of the regiment in the ground role to support the capture of Le Havre (Operation Astonia). The regiment fired some 1700 rounds, directed by its own Observation Post (OP) across the Seine estuary in the suburb of Honfleur, initially to suppress German Flak positions before the port was bombed by the Royal Air Force. Afterwards, the regiment moved up to provide AA defence at Dieppe after its capture, with E Troop of 383 Bty in a coastal artillery role.

== Antwerp and Brussels ==
Attention now shifted to the AA defence of the vital port of Antwerp, in which 80th AA Bde was to play a major role in combating the expected attacks by V-1 flying bombs (code-named 'Divers'). While at Dieppe, the regiment began to receive and train with the new Radar No 3 Mark V (the SCR-584 radar set) and No 10 Predictors (the all-electric Bell Labs AAA Computer) as used by AA Command during the summer's V-1 offensive against London. 86th (HAC) moved up from Dieppe to the Antwerp 'X' anti-Diver defences between 15 and 18 October. The regiment came under the operational control of the US 50th AA Artillery Brigade while 80th AA Bde concentrated on establishing an early-warning radar network. A short history of the regiment in the War Diary notes the irony of the Honourable Artillery Company of London defending that city's historical trade rival.

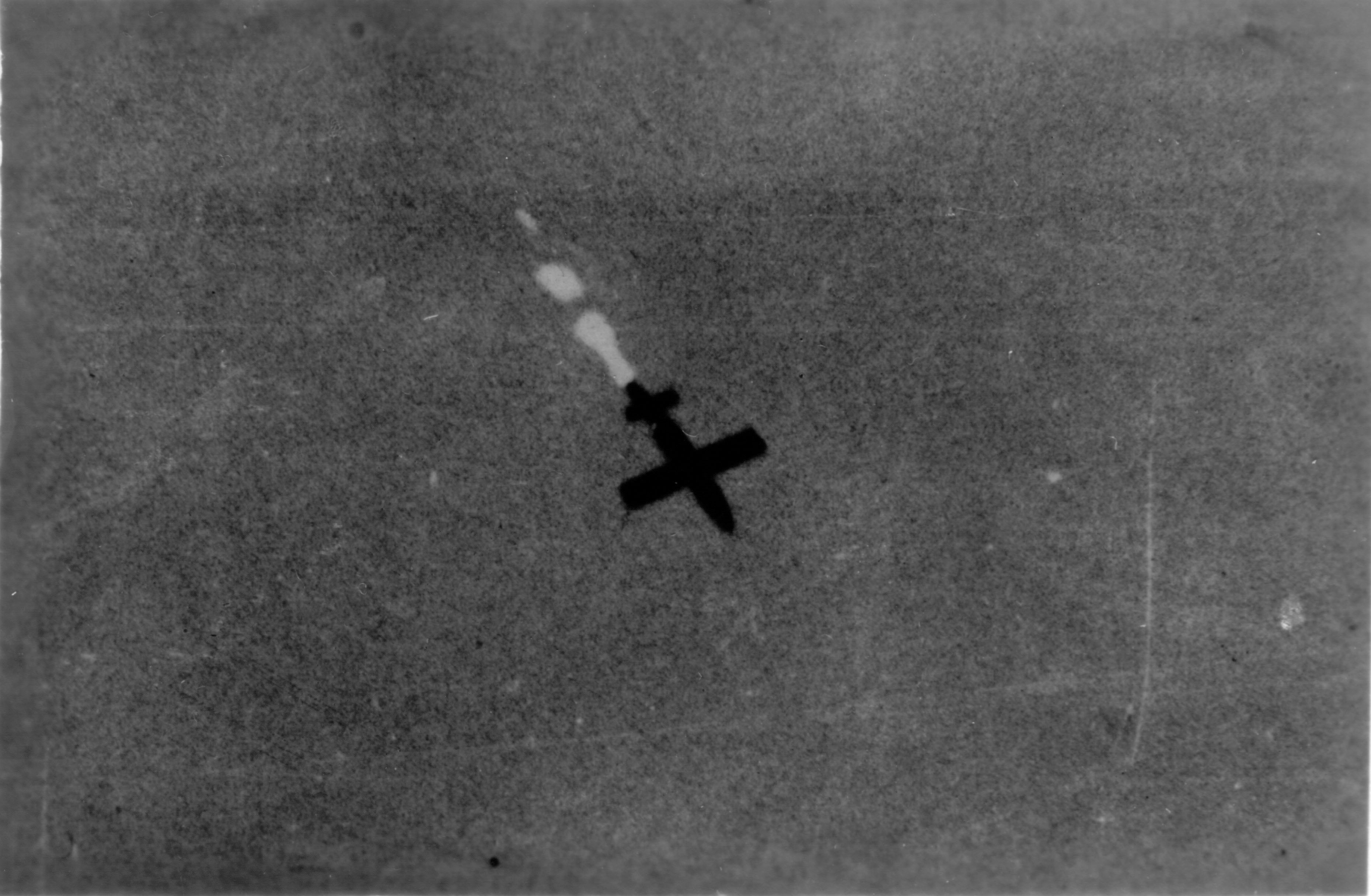
V-1 in flight over Antwerp

The first 'Diver' arrived in the Antwerp area on 23 October, but none came through 86th (HAC)'s area to begin with. 274 Bty scored the regiment's first two confirmed V-1 'kills' on 1 and 2 November. In mid-November, the regiment completed its radar training and moved to the Brussels 'X' defences under the operational control of 101st AA Bde, commanded by Brigadier John Ross, the 86th (HAC)'s former CO. Here it could also hit V-1s heading towards Antwerp. The regiment provided a detachment to help form 2 (Radar) Local Warning Troop. During this period, the regiment shot down 21 V-1s.

When the V-1 attacks on Antwerp were stepped up in December, 86th (HAC) returned to the Antwerp 'X' defences, where it also had to make preparations to operate in a ground role in case the German Ardennes Offensive broke through to the city. One Troop and Advanced RHQ were deployed in anti-tank positions. The regiment also lent its transport (1584 Platoon, Royal Army Service Corps) to allow other HAA regiments to act as a mobile Army Group Royal Artillery (AGRA). Despite concerted attacks on nearby airfields by Luftwaffe fighters on 1 January (Operation Bodenplatte), the ground situation was well under control and the AGRA and local defence plans were cancelled on that day.

At Antwerp, 86th (HAC) found that its targets were mainly Brussels-bound, so in January 1945, it was switched back to Brussels and 101st AA Bde. The final phase of the 'Diver' attacks were directed from north of Antwerp, and in spring 1945 the regiment moved into the 'Scheldt North' defences under 76th AA Bde. This involved relocating a Spitfire airfield in the line of fire. With the new equipment the regiment's success rate climbed to over 50 per cent of the targets engaged, but falling V-1s also presented dangers: one was shot down and fell into C Troop's 'Wagon Lines', killing one man and injuring three others, as well as destroying 10 vehicles.

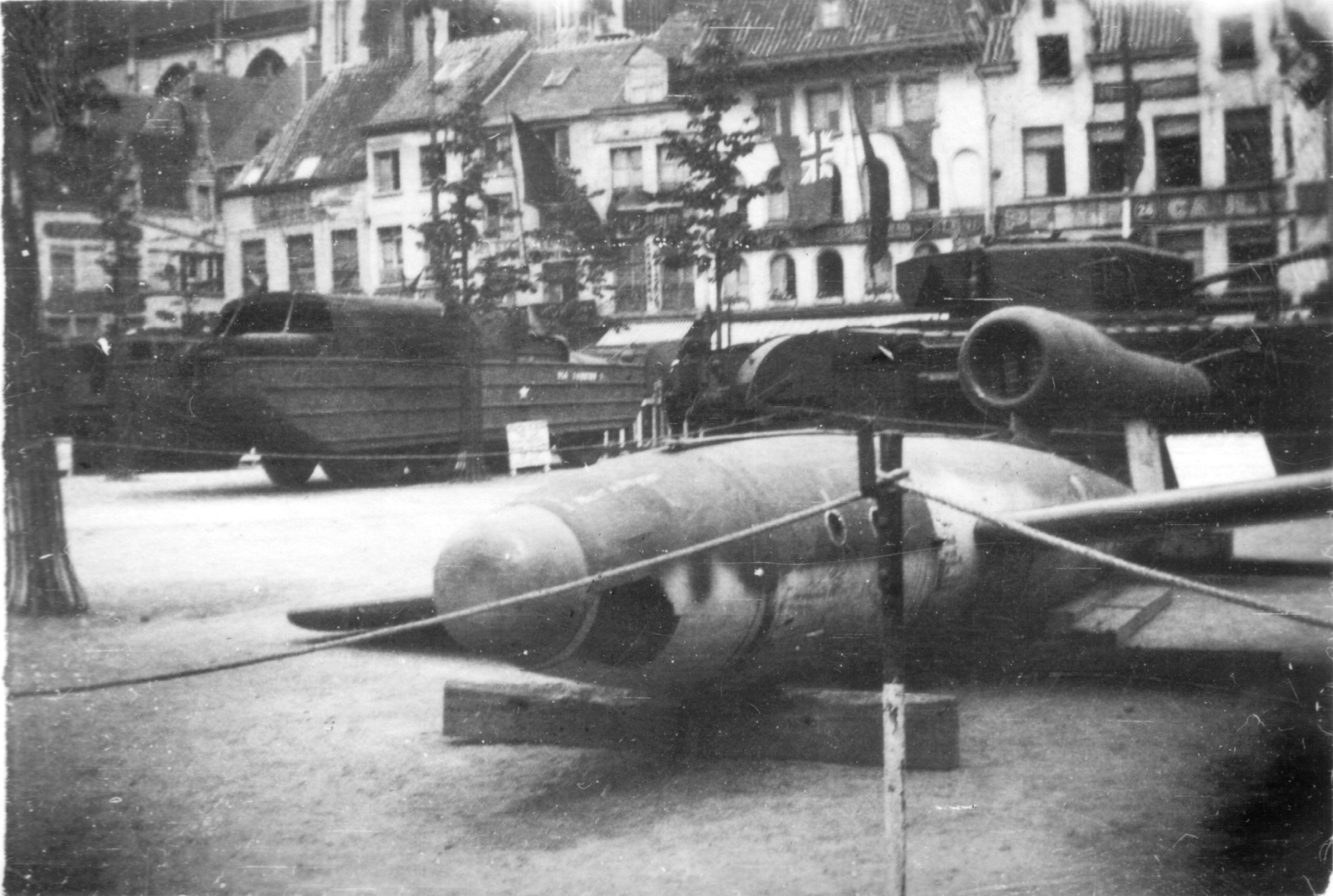
Captured V-1 displayed at Antwerp at the end of World War II.

Between 1 November 1944 and 14 March 1945, the regiment destroyed 78 V-1s at a cost of 9600 rounds of 3.7-inch ammunition. For his services since D-Day, Lt-Col Champness was awarded an OBE in February 1945. and in 1947 was made a Chevalier of the Belgian Order of Leopold II with palm, and received the Belgian Croix de Guerre 1940 with palm.

In late April 1945, the regiment was stationed on the islands of Walcheren and South Beveland, protecting the approaches to the port of Antwerp in both AA and coast defence roles. It was still there on VE Day in May 1945.

== Postwar ==
After VE Day, the regiment concentrated at Ostend, where it had other units temporarily attached to it while they went through the process of disbandment, including 5 and 6 LAA/Searchlight Btys, and 1 Identification Troop and 2 and 3 (Radar) Local Warning Troops from the Diver defences. It also had the ATS Clerks' school attached to it. Demobilisation of the regiment's personnel got under way during the summer, with Lt-Col Champness leaving in September.

At the end of October, the regiment moved into Germany, where it joined the British Army of the Rhine in occupation duties, based at Ostercappeln. Demobilisation was completed on 18 April 1946, when 86th (HAC) HAA Rgt was placed in suspended animation.

When the TA was reconstituted on 1 January 1947, the regiment was reformed at Finsbury as 238 Regiment HAC (HAA), subsequently redesignated 2nd Regiment HAC (HAA), and finally as 2nd Light Anti-Aircraft Regiment HAC with D and E Btys HAC. It formed part of 75th AA Bde (the former 49th AA Bde). It was disbanded on 10 March 1955 when AA Command was abolished.

== Insignia ==
During and after World War II, the 86th HAA in battledress wore the same shoulder title with 'H.A.C.' embroidered in red on navy blue as the other Honourable Artillery Company regiments. When Walking Out Dress was worn (probably only after World War II), all ranks wore HAC pattern buttons and shoulder chains.
