= 75th (Middlesex) Searchlight Regiment, Royal Artillery =

75th (Middlesex) Searchlight Regiment, RA 610th (Middlesex) Light Anti-Aircraft Regiment, RA
- Royal Artillery cap badge of WWII
- Active: 8 May 1939–15 June 1950
- Country: United Kingdom
- Branch: Territorial Army
- Type: Searchlight Regiment; Light Anti-Aircraft Regiment
- Role: Air Defence
- Size: Regiment
- Garrison/HQ: Cowley, London
- Engagements: The Blitz; Sicily; Italy

75th (Middlesex) Searchlight Regiment, Royal Artillery was an air defence unit of Britain's Territorial Army (TA) raised just before the outbreak of World War II and served as part of Anti-Aircraft Command in the early part of the war. Later, it changed role and served in Sicily and Italy, and reformed in AA Command after the war.

== Origin ==
As the international situation deteriorated in the late 1930s, the threat of air raids on the UK led to a rapid expansion in the numbers of anti-aircraft (AA) units manned by members of the part-time TA. Formed on 8 May 1939, the 75th (Middlesex) Searchlight Regiment of the Royal Artillery consisted of HQ and three searchlight batteries based at Cowley in Uxbridge.

== World War II ==
=== The Blitz ===
90 cm Projector Anti-Aircraft, displayed at Fort Nelson, Portsmouth

Anti-Aircraft Command mobilised in August 1939, ahead of the declaration of war on 3 September, and the regiment took its place in 38th Light Anti-Aircraft Brigade (a formation composed entirely of searchlight units) in 1st AA Division, which had responsibility for defending London.

Although AA Command and RAF Fighter Command had the advantage of the Chain Home radar network to detect air raids approaching the coastline, there was no radar coverage inland. In daylight, the Royal Observer Corps and searchlight detachments tracked the progress of raids visually; at night, sound location had to be used. 1st AA Division devised a system of 14 fixed base-lines of sound locators to detect night raids approaching the London Inner Artillery Zone. These were linked by automatic telephone equipment to the operations room, where the angular plots were resolved to indicate grid squares where the Heavy AA guns in range could fire an unseen barrage. Detachments of 75th S/L Rgt were trained to operate these baselines. This 'Fixed Azimuth' system came into action in June 1940, in time for the opening of the night Blitz on London. It was later replaced when searchlight control (SLC) and gunlaying (GL) radar systems were introduced.

London was attacked incessantly throughout the winter of 1940–41. 75th S/L Regiment served in 38 AA Bde in 1 AA Division in London through these raids until February 1941, when its role was changed.

=== 75th (Middlesex) Light Anti-Aircraft Regiment ===
On 15 February 1941, the regiment was re-equipped with light AA (LAA) guns and converted into 73rd (Middlesex) Light Anti-Aircraft Regiment, corrected on 26 February to 75th (Middlesex) Light Anti-Aircraft Regiment at Hanger Hill, Ealing, with 232, 233 and 234 LAA Batteries.

The regiment supplied a cadre of experienced officers and men to 225th LAA Training Rgt at Newquay where they provided the basis for a new 303 LAA Bty formed on 18 September 1941. The battery joined the regiment on 9 December 1941 to replace 232 LAA Bty, which joined a newly forming 97th LAA Rgt. On 19 February 1942 the regiment formed a new 467 LAA Bty from cadres provided by its own 233 and 234 LAA Btys and by 277 LAA Bty of 83rd LAA Rgt. On 10 July 1942, 467 LAA Bty transferred to a newly-forming 141st LAA Rgt (it later served in the defence of Gibraltar).

Early in 1943, 75th LAA Rgt was assigned to 76th AA Bde, which was training units for service overseas. The regiment was then despatched to the Mediterranean to join Eighth Army for the Allied invasion of Sicily (Operation Husky). The assault went in early on 10 July 1943 against light opposition, and all Eighth Army's landings were successful. The town of Pachino was quickly secured, and 75th LAA's Bofors guns landed shortly afterwards to contribute to the AA defence of its airfield. Work started at once to repair this for use by the RAF, though this was interrupted by frequent day and night air raids. Even after the airfield was in operation, raids against it continued until the Luftwaffe withdrew to mainland Italy in mid-August. At this stage, 75th LAA Rgt had 233 and 234 Batteries protecting Pachino airfield and the beach, and 303 Battery at Cassibile Airfield.

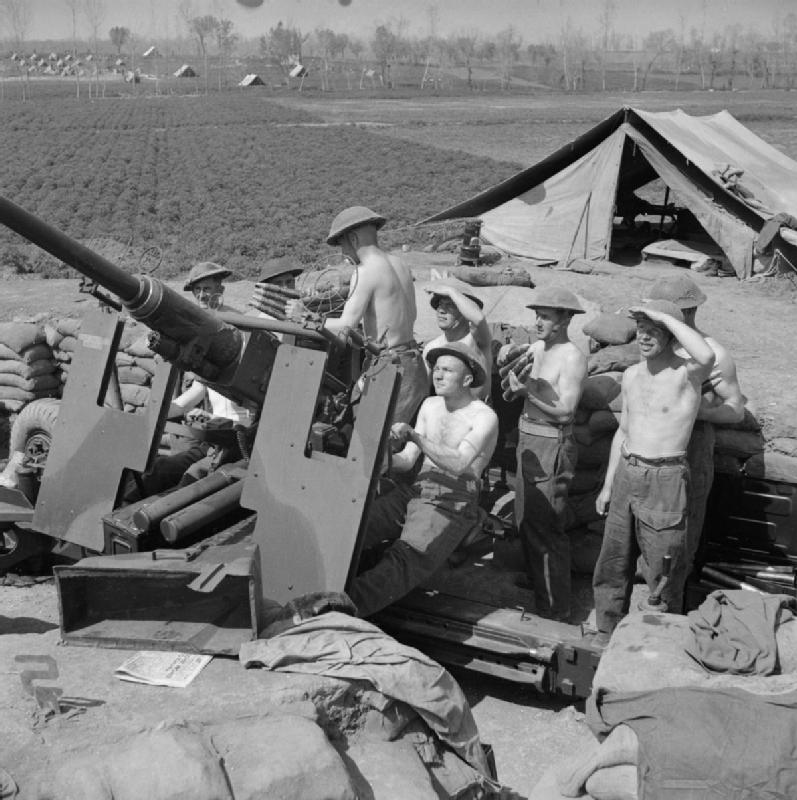
A Bofors gun crew in Italy, April 1944

Eighth Army captured the port of Taranto on the Italian mainland in September 1943 (Operation Baytown), and during October 8th AA Bde was landed there to defend the disembarkation ports and airfields in the 'heel' of Italy (southern Puglia) in a joint air defence organisation with the RAF. 75th LAA Rgt was one of the units assigned to this task, with one battery of 18 Bofors guns deployed at Brindisi Airfield, and the rest of the regiment as detachments at other airfields in the area.

In December 1943, 25th AA Bde relieved 8th AA Bde and assumed command of 75th LAA Rgt. It upgraded the defence of Brindisi port by moving in another battery of 75th LAA Rgt. However, as the Italian Campaign progressed, the region was becoming a backwater and the fighting units of Eighth Army urgently required manpower, so a reduction in AA units was begun in May 1944. 75th LAA Rgt was one of those selected for disbandment and on 8 September 1944, Regmental HQ with 233, 234 and 303 LAA Btys passed into suspended animation.and its personnel posted away.

== Postwar ==
When the TA was reconstituted on 1 January 1947, 75th LAA Rgt was reformed at Cowley as 610 Light Anti-Aircraft Regiment, RA (Middlesex), forming part of 82 AA Bde (the former 56 AA Bde based at Heston).

On 15 June 1950, the regiment was merged into another unit in 82 AA Bde, 604 Light Anti-Aircraft/Searchlight Regiment, RA (Royal Fusiliers) (the former 69th (3rd City of London) S/L Rgt), and the 75th S/L Rgt lineage ended.
