= 80th Anti-Aircraft Brigade =

- Active: 10 April 1943–25 February 1946
- Country: United Kingdom
- Branch: British Army
- Type: Anti-Aircraft Brigade
- Role: Air Defence
- Part of: 21st Army Group
- Engagements: D-Day; Normandy campaign Defence of Antwerp

Commanders
- Notable commanders: Brig H.W. Deacon, CBE, DFC

The 80th Anti-Aircraft Brigade (80th AA Bde) was an air defence formation of the British Army during the Second World War. It landed on D-Day and saw action throughout the campaign in North West Europe, providing early warning of attacks by V-1 flying bombs against Antwerp during the winter of 1944–45.

== Origin ==
80th AA Brigade was formed on 10 April 1943 at Blandford Camp under the command of Brigadier H.W. Deacon. Within a month the Headquarters (HQ) and mobile AA Operations Room (AAOR) personnel and the Brigade Signal Section had joined, and the brigade had taken command of its first units: 86th (Honourable Artillery Company) and 103rd Heavy AA Regiments, 73rd and 114th Light AA Regiments.

Brigadier Henry Wynn Deacon (1893–1977) was commissioned into the Royal Artillery in 1913 and had served during the First World War. Seconded to the Royal Air Force as an observer (1918–20), he had been awarded a Distinguished Flying Cross (DFC) for making reconnaissance flights under fire during the closing weeks of the Mesopotamian campaign. Since the outbreak of the Second World War he had commanded 13th Anti-Tank Regiment in the Battle of France and then served in the West African defences. Latterly he had commanded the Fixed Defences in Home Forces.

== Training ==
80th AA Brigade did not form part of Anti-Aircraft Command but came under the Hampshire and Dorset District of Home Forces, and was later assigned to Second Army forming for the planned invasion of Normandy (Operation Overlord). Immediately upon formation, the brigade began training with Nos 5 and 6 Beach Parties, which would control the support services during the assault landings on Sword Beach. Demonstrations of opposed beach landing by AA guns were carried out in May 1943, and the regiments attended practice camps in various part of the UK. On completion of training and field exercises, the regiments were sometimes deployed under AA Command formations to assist Air Defence of Great Britain (ADGB).

In Second Army's plan for Overlord, I Corps, supported by 80th AA Bde, was to land on two beaches, Sword and Juno, while XXX Corps, supported by 76th AA Bde, was to land on the other beach (Gold). In January 1944, 76th AA Bde was placed under the command of 80th AA Bde for operations and training, an arrangement that remained in place until after D-Day.

Light AA (LAA) defence was to be emphasised at the start of the operation, since low-level attack by Luftwaffe aircraft was considered the most likely threat. In December 1943–January 1944, 114th LAA Rgt carried out user trials at No 16 AA Practice Camp at Clacton-on-Sea on self-propelled (SP) 40 mm Bofors guns mounted on Crusader tank chassis, a proportion of which later equipped that regiment and 73rd LAA Rgt. On 1 January, 93rd LAA Regiment joined from ADGB. This regiment was given a special assault role in the Overlord plan, for which it was equipped with the new 20 mm Polsten gun in triple mountings, half of them mounted on Crusader chassis.

== Order of battle ==
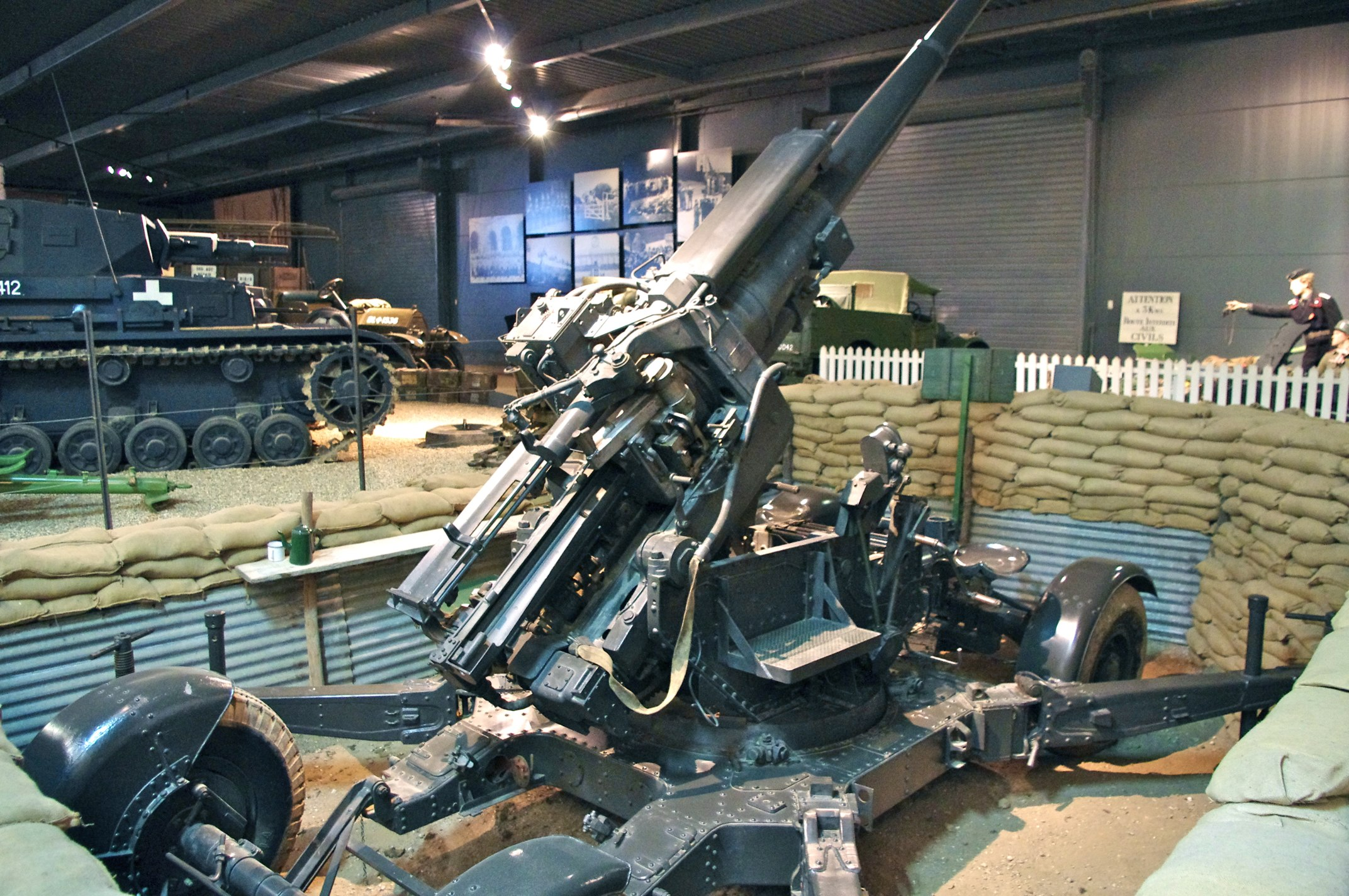
3.7 inch HAA gun preserved at Imperial War Museum, Duxford. Used in HAA and medium roles in Normandy.

The basic organisation of 80th AA Bde was fixed in 1943, and had reached its full extent by D-Day:

- 86th (HAC) HAA Rgt – 24 x 3.7-inch guns
  - 273, 274, 383 Batteries
- 103rd HAA Rgt – 24 x 3.7-inch guns
  - 322, 323, 324 Btys
- 73rd LAA Rgt – 54 x 40 mm Bofors guns (of which 6 SP tracked)
  - 218, 220, 296 Btys
- 93rd LAA Rgt – 36 x 20 mm guns (of which 18 SP tracked)
  - 321, 322 Btys
  - 320 Bty (18 x 20 mm, of which 9 SP) detached to 76 AA Bde on Gold Beach
- 114th LAA Rgt – 30 x 40 mm Bofors guns (of which 12 SP)
  - 372, 373 Btys
  - 375 Bty and one Trp 372 Bty (24 x SP) detached to 76 AA Bde on Gold Beach

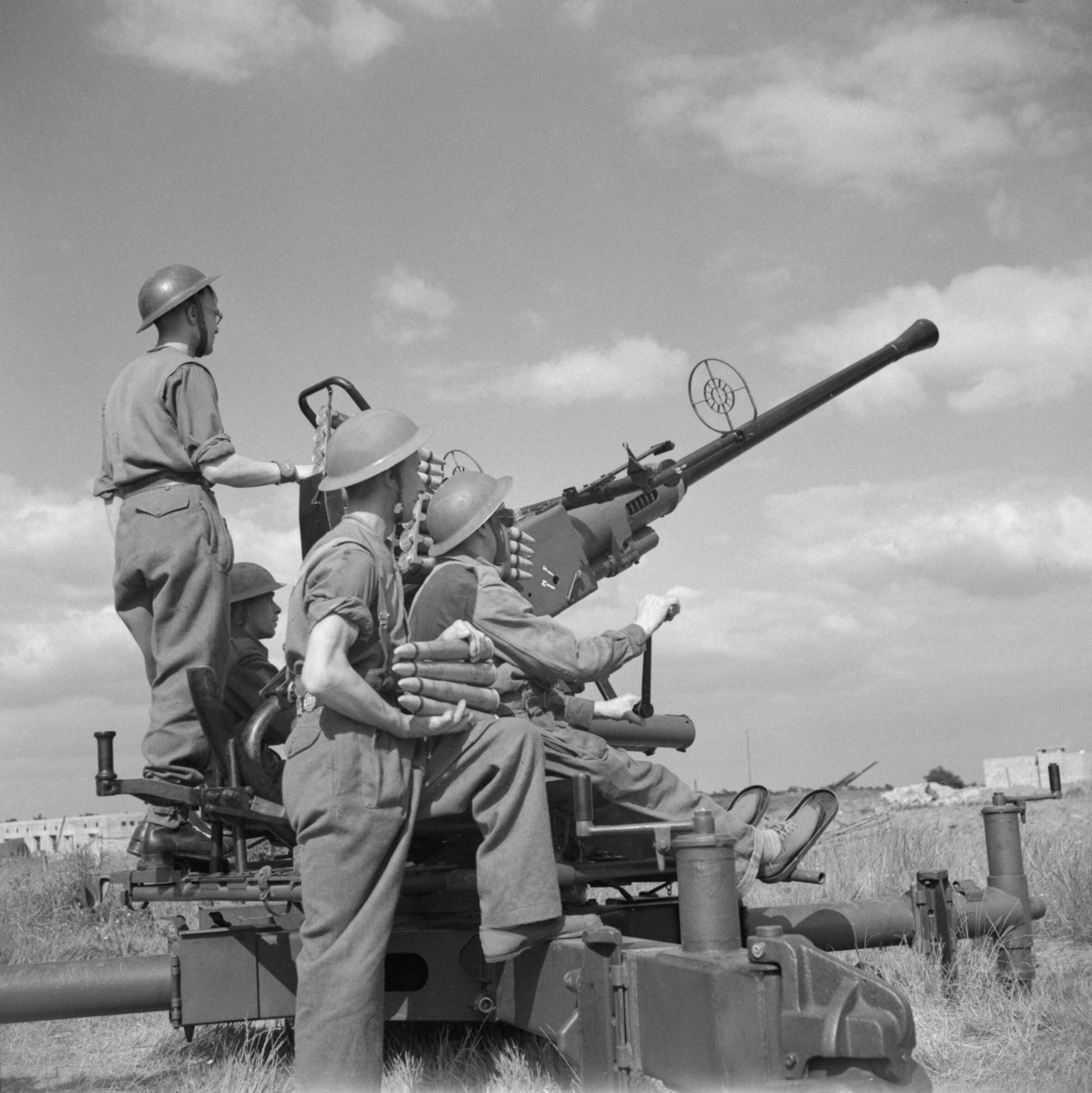
Bofors gun and crew, summer 1944.

- 474th (Independent) Searchlight Battery – 24 x 90 cm S/L
- 155 and 160 AA Operations Rooms (AAOR)
- 16 Fire Control Post
- 76 and 103 Coast Observation Detachments
- 80th AA Bde Signals, Royal Corps of Signals
- 379 Artillery Company, Royal Army Service Corps – detached to Supply & Transport Column for assault phase
  - 1573 LAA Regiment Platoon
  - 1584 HAA Regiment Platoon
  - 1587 LAA Regiment Platoon
  - 1613 HAA Regiment Platoon
- 80th AA Brigade Workshop, Royal Electrical and Mechanical Engineers (REME)

– each AA Regiment and the S/L Battery also had its own REME Workshop

- 112 Company Pioneer Corps – equipped with smoke generators
  - 15 Sections, plus 5 Sections detached to 76 AA Bde on Gold Beach

Also under command for the Assault Phase:

- F Troop of the 318th Battery, 92nd (Loyals) Light Anti-Aircraft Regiment, Royal Artillery (Self-propelled Bofors) – detached from the 3rd British Division and tasked to join the 6th Airborne Division to help defend the Bénouville bridges following their capture.
- 139th Light Anti-Aircraft Regiment, Royal Artillery
  - RHQ aboard MV Mosquito
  - 177, 230 Btys divided into three groups, each manning 5 AA barges off each Second Army beach
- 63rd Bty, 20th LAA Regiment – 9 x 40 mm and up to 24 x 20 mm on 'Gooseberry' blockships
- 4 x Beach Balloon units

== D-Day ==
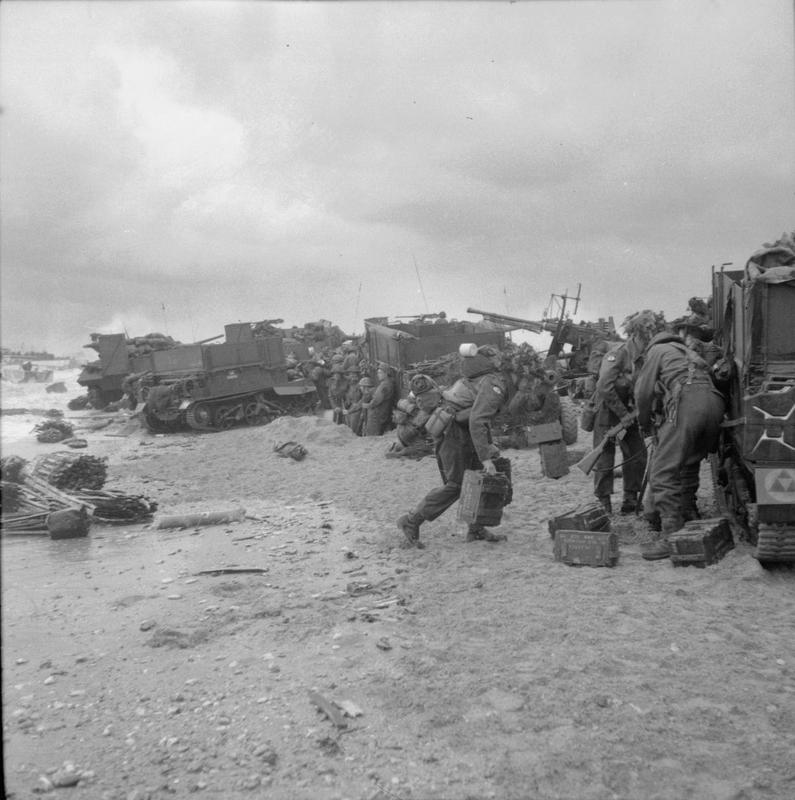
Troops of 3rd Division sheltering on Sword Beach on D-Day, with Bofors gun in background.

Elements of 80th AA Bde landed with the leading waves on D-Day (6 June), divided into four assault groups each under the command of one of the regimental headquarters (RHQs):

Under 3rd British Division on Sword Beach:

- 'M' AA Assault Group with No 5 Beach Group, 101 Beach Sub-area
  - RHQ 73rd LAA Rgt (Lt-Col J.A. Armstrong)
  - 218/73 LAA Bty
  - 296/73 LAA Bty less 2 Troops
  - G & H Troops 322/93 LAA Bty
  - 322/103 HAA Bty
  - C Troop 323/103 HAA Bty
  - B Troop 474 S/L Bty
  - 16 Fire Control Post
  - 76 & 103 Coast Observation Detachments
  - One Platoon 112 Company, Pioneer Corps (smoke generators)
  - 73 LAA Rgt Workshop, REME
- 'N' AA Assault Group with No 6 Beach Group, 101 Beach Sub-area
  - RHQ 103rd HAA Rgt (Lt-Col H.E. Johnston)
  - D Troop 323/103 HAA Bty
  - 324/103 HAA Bty
  - 220/73 LAA Bty
  - I Troop 322/73 LAA Bty
  - C Troop 474 S/L Bty
  - 160 AA Operations Room
  - One Platoon 112 Pioneer Company
  - 103 HAA Rgt Workshop, REME

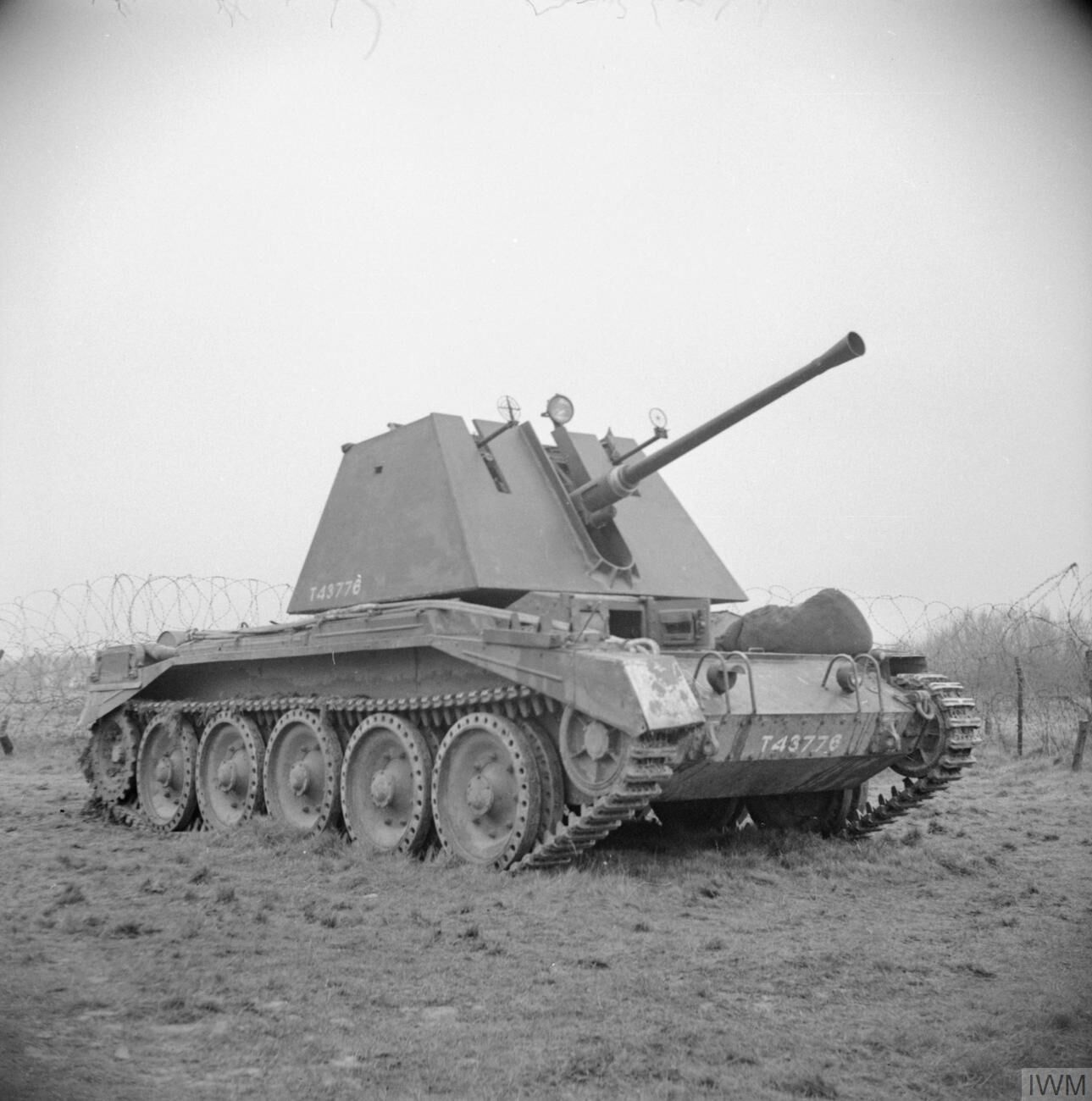
Crusader AA tank mounting 40 mm Bofors gun.

Under 3rd Canadian Division on Juno Beach:

- 'O' AA Assault Group with No 7 Beach Group, 102 Beach Sub-area
  - RHQ 114th LAA Rgt (Lt-Col N.W. Hoare)
  - 372/114 LAA Bty less C Troop
  - 321/93 LAA Bty less E Troop
  - 274/86 HAA Bty
  - 1 Troop 383/86 HAA Bty
  - 474 S/L Bty, less B and C Troops
  - 112 Pioneer Company less detachments
  - 114 LAA Rgt Workshop, REME
- 'P' AA Assault Group with No 8 Beach Group, 102 Beach Sub-area
  - RHQ 86th (HAC) HAA Rgt (Lt-Col G.H. Champness)
  - 273/86 HAA Bty
  - 383/86 HAA Bty less 1 Troop
  - 375/114 LAA Bty
  - 1 Troop 296/73 LAA Bty
  - 1 Troop 321/93 LAA Bty
  - Detachment 112 Pioneer Company
  - 86th HAA Rgt Workshop, REME

The regiments landed with minimum scales of equipment, to be brought up to strength by parties arriving later, while some elements of the brigade landed with 76th AA Bde on Gold Beach. 80th AA Bde planned to bring the following equipment ashore in I Corps' area before nightfall (although this proved to be too ambitious):

- 32 x 3.7-inch HAA guns
- 84 x 40mm Bofors LAA guns
- 16 x 20 mm Polsten LAA guns
- 12 x S/Ls

Brigade HQ moved to the marshalling areas on 23 May and embarked on 2–3 June, the Tactical HQ aboard LCTs 1133 and 1134 at Gosport, the main HQ aboard LSTs 3001 and 3002 at Tilbury. Tactical HQ sailed on 5 June and was due to land at 11.00 on 6 June (D-Day) but was delayed because of congestion on the beaches. Eventually it landed at 15.30 near Courseulles-sur-Mer, by which time the AA Report Centre on the beach was functioning satisfactorily. Tactical HQ was established at Beny-sur-Mer.

The brigade's units experienced considerable problems during the landings, with losses of landing craft and hard fire-fights still going on to establish a firm hold, especially at Juno. 73rd LAA Rgt managed to land some of its 40 mm Bofors guns on the first tide, but heavy fire prevented 218th Bty from reaching its positions until five hours later, while 220th Bty found its intended positions to be still in enemy hands. 80th AA Bde's communication difficulties meant that 73rd LAA Rgt remained out of contact until the following day (D+1). None of the HAA guns were successfully landed until the following afternoon, and these were damaged in landing. Luckily, Luftwaffe air attacks on D-Day were few and sporadic. Additional Troops of 73rd and 114th LAA Rgts landed on D+1 as air attacks began to increase, peaking on D+3.

B Troop of 322/103 HAA Bty had a secondary coastal artillery role to protect shipping off Queen sector from attack by German E-boats, particularly at night. For this purpose 16 Fire Control Post and 76 and 103 Coast Observer detachments were landed with it, under command of 103rd HAA Rgt. The guns would fire blind, controlled by radar, or with the assistance of searchlights.

Once the initial landings had been achieved, the AA Assault Groups were broken up and reorganised by regimental groups, the regimental commander being AA Defence Commander for the local area. The troop of 92nd LAA set off to join the glider troops at Bénouville (Pegasus Bridge) and the brigade settled down to its initial task of defending the unloading shipping and landing craft, and the beach exits.

== Normandy ==
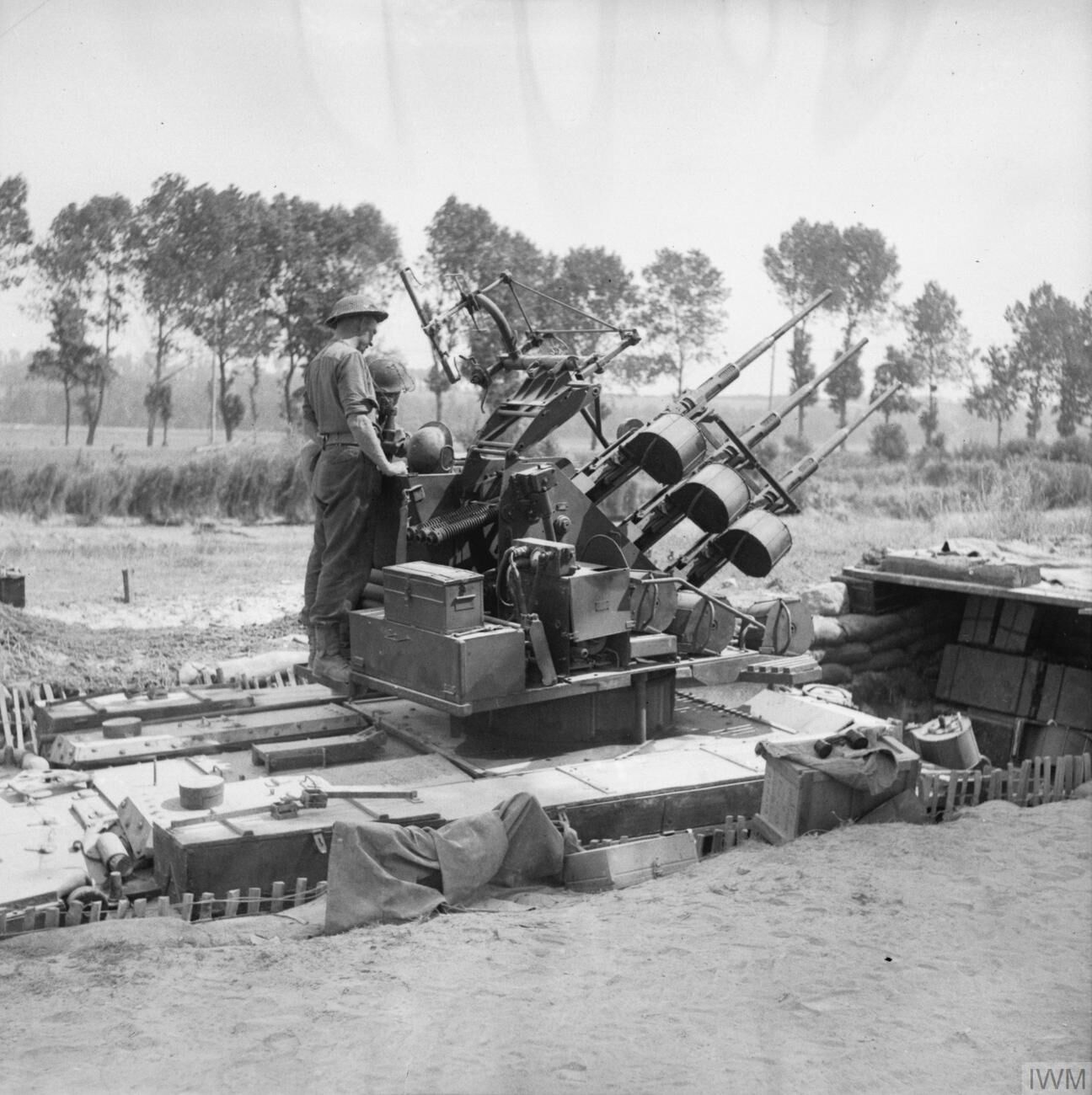
Crusader AA tank mounting a triple 20mm gun in a hull-down position, 19 July 1944

As the build-up in the Normandy beachhead grew during June and July 1944, 80 AA Bde was tasked with protecting Juno and Sword beaches, the small port of Ouistreham, and the Orne and Caen Canal bridges at Bénouville, the whole being designated an Inner Artillery Zone (IAZ) at night. For June, 80th AA Bde reported ratios of one aircraft shot down for every 253 HAA or 1097 LAA rounds fired.

Although Luftwaffe air attacks over the beachhead were generally sporadic, they concentrated on the bridges, while Sword Beach and the whole Eastern Sector remained under mortar and artillery fire. At the end of July, 114th LAA Rgt reported that it was being attacked by a 'secret weapon'. Upon investigation it appeared that it was being shelled by a large calibre gun from long range.

When the first elements of 100th AA Bde arrived (starting with 113th (Durham Light Infantry) LAA Rgt and 60th (City of London) HAA Rgt), they were temporarily placed under the orders of 80th AA Bde. Some of 63/20th LAA Bty's crews were washed off their Gooseberries during the storm of 19/20 June, and they were sent to reinforce 73rd and 114th LAA Rgts.

Given the low intensity of Luftwaffe air attacks, HAA guns in the bridgehead were sometimes made available to fire on ground targets for bombardment, counter-battery and anti-tank shoots. For example, 80th AA Bde's 3.7-inch guns fired in support of I Corps during Operation Charnwood on 8 July. The brigade's HAA guns stationed at the mouth of the Orne were also tasked with a role in coast defence, to fire an airburst high explosive barrage against enemy craft if requested by the Royal Navy. Some searchlights from 474th S/L Battery were also given a subsidiary coast defence role, while radar sets were used to plot Parachute mines being dropped by German aircraft in the anchorage (though the AA guns were forbidden to engage them for fear of causing casualties among the shipping). A roving Troop of 114th LAA Rgt was sent to protect an important ammunition ship unloading at Ouistreham.

Brigadier Deacon was awarded a CBE for his work in planning and commanding the AA defences for D-Day and the subsequent Normandy campaign, and later received a US Bronze Star for his war services.

== Breakout ==
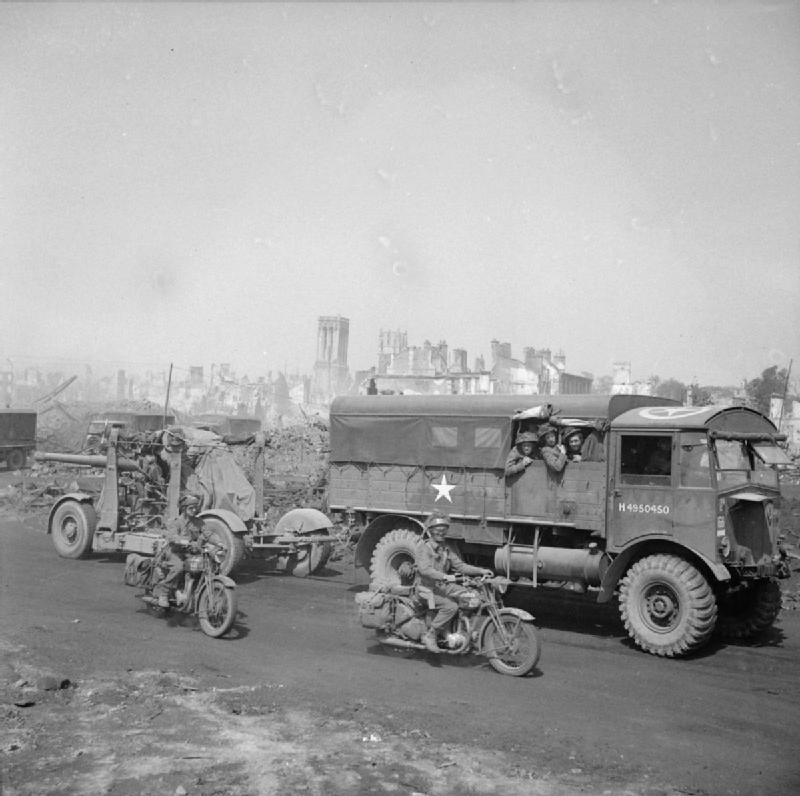
A Matador tractor tows a 3.7-inch AA gun through the ruins of Caen, August 1944.

At the end of August, 21st Army Group broke out from the Normandy beachhead and began to pursue the defeated German troops across Northern France. AA defence of the beachhead became less important and 80th AA Bde could be released from its commitments there in order to follow the advance. First, 114th LAA Rgt was sent to guard the crossings of the River Seine under the command of the newly arrived 74th AA Bde. Then 80th AA Bde was relieved on 3 September and took over responsibility for the Seine crossings the following day, with 274/86th HAA Bty, 73rd and 125th (Cameronians) LAA Rgts (the latter from 76th AA Bde), and a troop of 474th S/L Bty under command.

On 12 September, 80th AA Bde relieved 76th AA Bde at Dieppe with 86th and 103rd HAA Rgts, retaining 146th HAA Rgt from 76th and being rejoined by 114th LAA Rgt. It also rook over responsibility for Rouen, Abbeville and the bridges over the River Somme from 107th AA Brigade, sending 146th HAA there, taking over 120th LAA Rgt and 177/139th LAA Bty. On 19 September, 1, 3 and 4 LAA/SL Btys arrived at the Seine crossings, relieving 73rd LAA Rgt, which moved to Le Havre, while 120th and 125th LAA Rgts went to Boulogne, which was still being besieged. Newly arrived batteries of 41st and 42nd S/L Rgts joined the brigade at Dieppe: one of the roles for the searchlights was to illuminate Prisoner of War (PoW) camps. Later, 146th HAA Rgt and 6/20th LAA Bty left to join 75th AA Bde further up the coast at Ostend, and 73rd LAA Rgt joined 103rd AA Bde.

== Antwerp ==
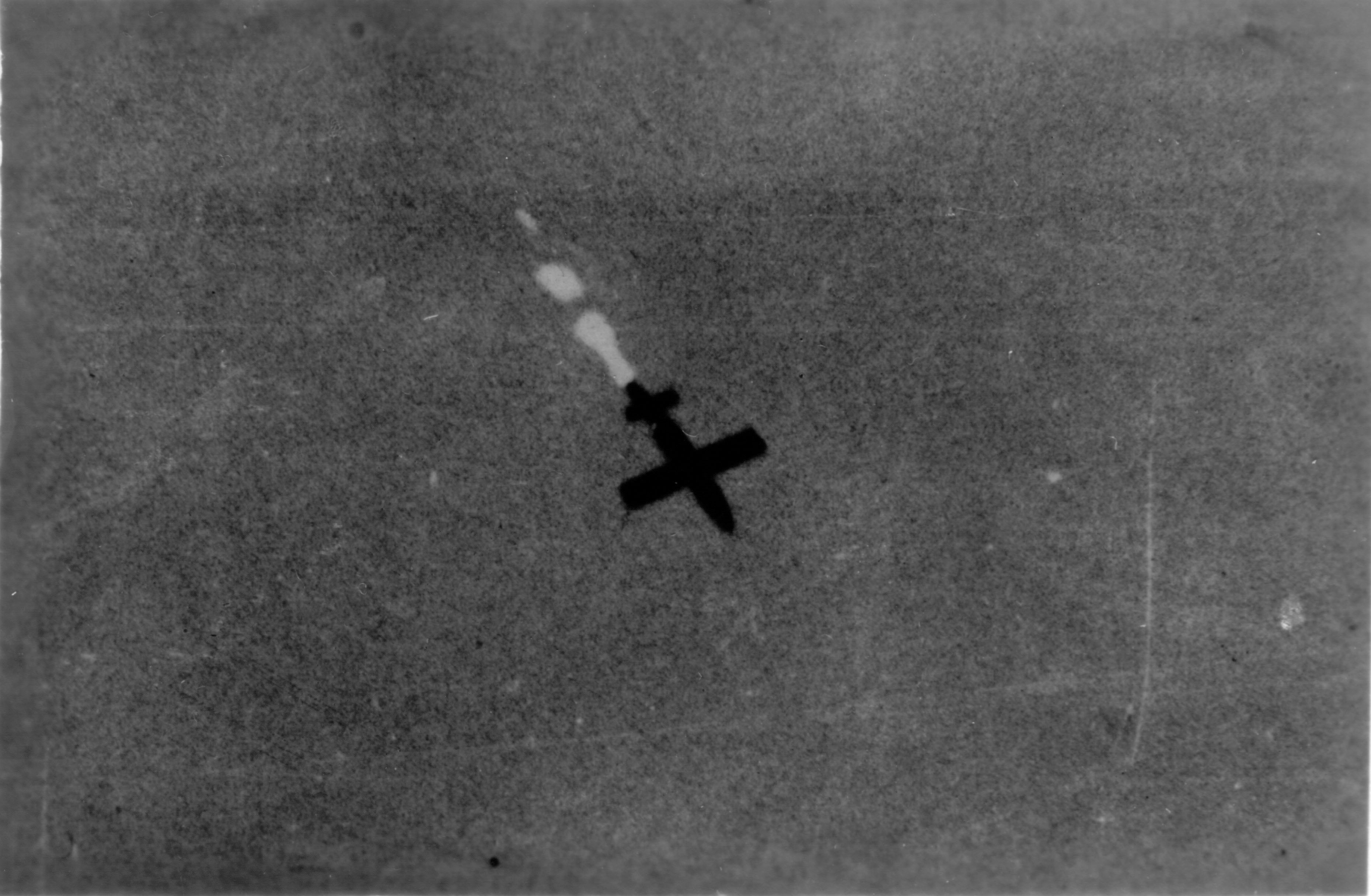
V-1 in flight over Antwerp

The headlong advance ended with the failure of Operation Market Garden at Arnhem, and emphasis shifted to bringing the port of Antwerp into use as a supply base. The planners envisaged a large Gun Defence Area (GDA) to deal not only with conventional air raids but also the threat of V-1 flying bombs (codenamed 'Divers'). At the beginning of October, 80th AA Bde began to equip its HAA units with Radar No 3 Mark V (the SCR-584 radar set) and No 10 Predictors (the all-electric Bell Labs AAA Computer), and began training operators on them in preparation for tracking these small fast-moving targets. Meanwhile, 114th LAA Rgt was re-equipped with the HAA's Vickers No 1 Predictor.

80th AA Bde handed over its responsibilities at Dieppe and arrived to reinforce the Antwerp defences with 73rd LAA, 86th HAA and 155th AAOR on 17 October. It was ready for action the following day, while 114th LAA reinforced 5th Royal Marine AA Bde in the city. The first 'Diver' arrived in the Antwerp area on 23 October. At the beginning of November, 80th AA Bde was given responsibility for all early warning and tracking for Antwerp and Brussels. While Bde HQ concentrated in this task, all its units were distributed under the operational command of other British and US AA brigades, apart from those training on the new radar and predictors.

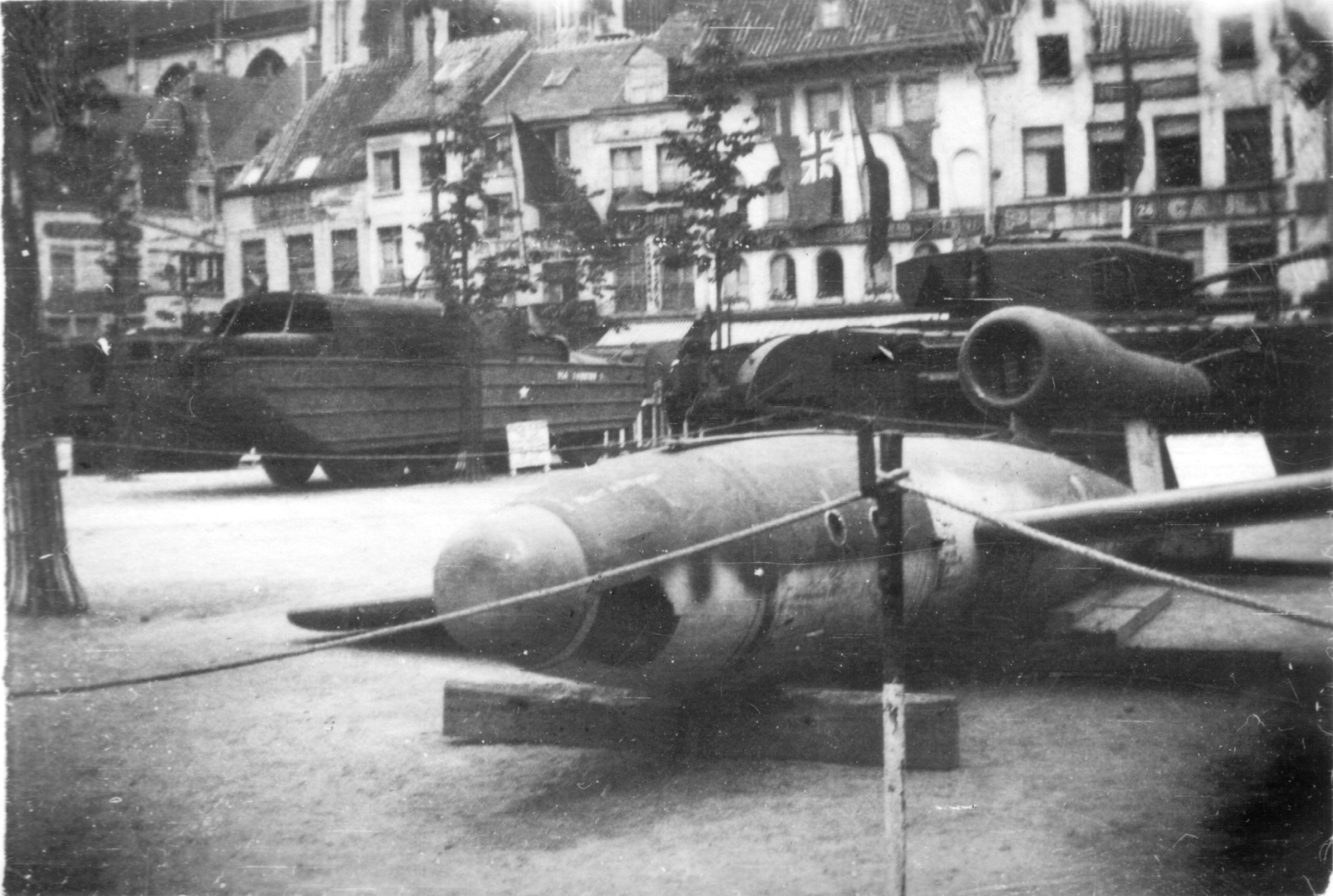
Captured V-1 displayed at Antwerp at the end of the Second World War.

To defend against V-1s falling in the city and dock area, the British and US guns had to be positioned at least 10 miles outside the city (codenamed the Nylen Belt), integrated into a system of warning stations and observation posts, supported by radar and searchlights. No 1 Identification Troop and No 2 Local Warning (Radar) Troop were formed by 80 AA Bde for this purpose, manned by the Royal Signals and 114th LAA Rgt respectively. This 'Antwerp X' defence deployment took its full form in December 1944, in time for the peak in V-1 attacks that lasted into February 1945.

The responsibility for siting the six early warning stations and 30 gun position radar sets over a wide area fell to 80th AA Bde's Instructor Fire Control (Radar), Captain William Adams, and his assistant, Staff Sergeant B.T. Bayne. They travelled extensively, training the operators and troubleshooting problems on the new radar. The effectiveness of the early warning system steadily improved, so that by the end of the campaign it was operating at almost 100 per cent efficiency. Captain Adams was awarded the US Bronze Star and S/Sgt Bayne the Belgian Croix de Guerre for their work.

When the Germans began their offensive in the Ardennes in December 1944 (the Battle of the Bulge) and briefly threatened to break through to Antwerp, 80 AA Bde was warned on 20 December to prepare to convert into an Army Group Royal Artillery (AGRA) at short notice. AGRAs were groups of (usually) medium and heavy artillery held at Corps level. If necessary, the brigade would control 98th and 99th (London Welsh) HAA Rgts to operate in the medium role supporting 11th Armoured Division and 3rd AGRA. The brigade would also be responsible for the ground defence of the approaches to Tirlemont, taking anti-paratroop measures. 86th (HAC) HAA regiment, which was relieving 98th HAA Rgt in the Antwerp X defences, was to lend its transport (1584 Platoon, RASC) to make the latter regiment fully mobile. Despite concerted attacks on nearby airfields by Luftwaffe fighters on 1 January (Operation Bodenplatte), the ground situation was well under control and the AGRA and local defence plans were cancelled on that day.

== Germany ==
V-1 attacks on Antwerp continued during the winter of 1944–45. On 2 March 1945, one of the radar stations was hit by a flying bomb, with casualties and considerable damage to equipment. However, as the Allied forces advanced into Germany the air threat dwindled. The last V-1 landed at Antwerp on 29 March. By late April 1945, a number of AA units had been declared surplus to requirements and were awaiting disbandment. 80th AA Bde was ordered to hand over all its units to other HQs and prepare for garrison duties. By VE Day, Brigade HQ was carrying out occupation duties at Lübeck in Germany, with 28th Battalion Royal Marines and a Special Air Service squadron under command.

After the end of the war in Europe, 80th AA Bde HQ continued to command occupation forces, engaged in guarding and repatriating PoWs and displaced persons (Operation Clobber), and in internal security exercised through the Wehrmacht Control Police. By the beginning of 1946 it was based at Eutin in Schleswig-Holstein, with the Royal Dragoons, 98th (Surrey & Sussex Yeomanry) Field Rgt and 93rd LAA Rgt under command, though 93rd LAA was disbanded during January. Brigade HQ itself was disbanded on 25 February 1946.

== Postwar ==
In 1947, a new 80 AA Brigade was formed in the Territorial Army (TA). However, this was unconnected with the wartime formation of the same number; instead it was formed by reconstituting the TA's former 54 AA Bde at Sutton Coldfield. It was disbanded after less than two years.

== External sources ==
- British Army units from 1945 on (archive site)
- Generals of World War II
- Royal Artillery 1939–1945
- Graham Watson, The Territorial Army 1947
