= 1st Anti-Aircraft Group (United Kingdom) =

1 Anti-Aircraft Group
- Active: October 1942–March 1955
- Country: United Kingdom
- Branch: British Army
- Type: Anti-Aircraft Group
- Role: Air Defence
- Part of: Anti-Aircraft Command
- Garrison/HQ: Stanmore
- Engagements: Baby Blitz; Operation Diver

Commanders
- Notable commanders: Maj-Gen Erroll Tremlett; Maj-Gen Roger Reynolds; Maj-Gen William Revell-Smith

1st Anti-Aircraft Group (1 AA Group) was a formation created by the British Army's Anti-Aircraft Command in 1942 to control anti-aircraft (AA) units defending London against Luftwaffe attacks during World War II. It continued this role into the Cold War until disbandment in 1955.

== World War II ==
1 AA Group was formed on 1 October 1942 when Lieutenant-General Sir Frederick 'Tim' Pile, Commander-in-Chief of Anti-Aircraft Command (AA Command), scrapped its previous conventional structure of Corps and Divisions. Each of the new AA Groups was commanded by a major-general and controlled a number of AA Brigades and support units. The new group boundaries were aligned with the Fighter Groups of the Royal Air Force (RAF). (It was jokingly observed that a reorganisation that eliminated eight general officers was the best contribution to the war effort at the time.)

1 AA Group's area of responsibility covered the London Inner Artillery Zone (IAZ) formerly controlled by 1 AA Division, and later included the 'Thames North' and 'Thames South' defences either side of the Thames Estuary from the former 6 AA Division. This tightly defined area was almost surrounded by 2 AA Group covering South East England, and together the two groups mirrored No. 11 Group RAF.

The first General Officer Commanding (GOC) of 1 AA Group was Maj-Gen Erroll Tremlett, who had previously commanded 10 AA Division. A former first-class cricketer, Tremlett had distinguished himself earlier in the war when he commanded 54th (Argyll and Sutherland Highlanders) Light Anti-Aircraft Regiment, Royal Artillery defending the mole during the Dunkirk evacuation.

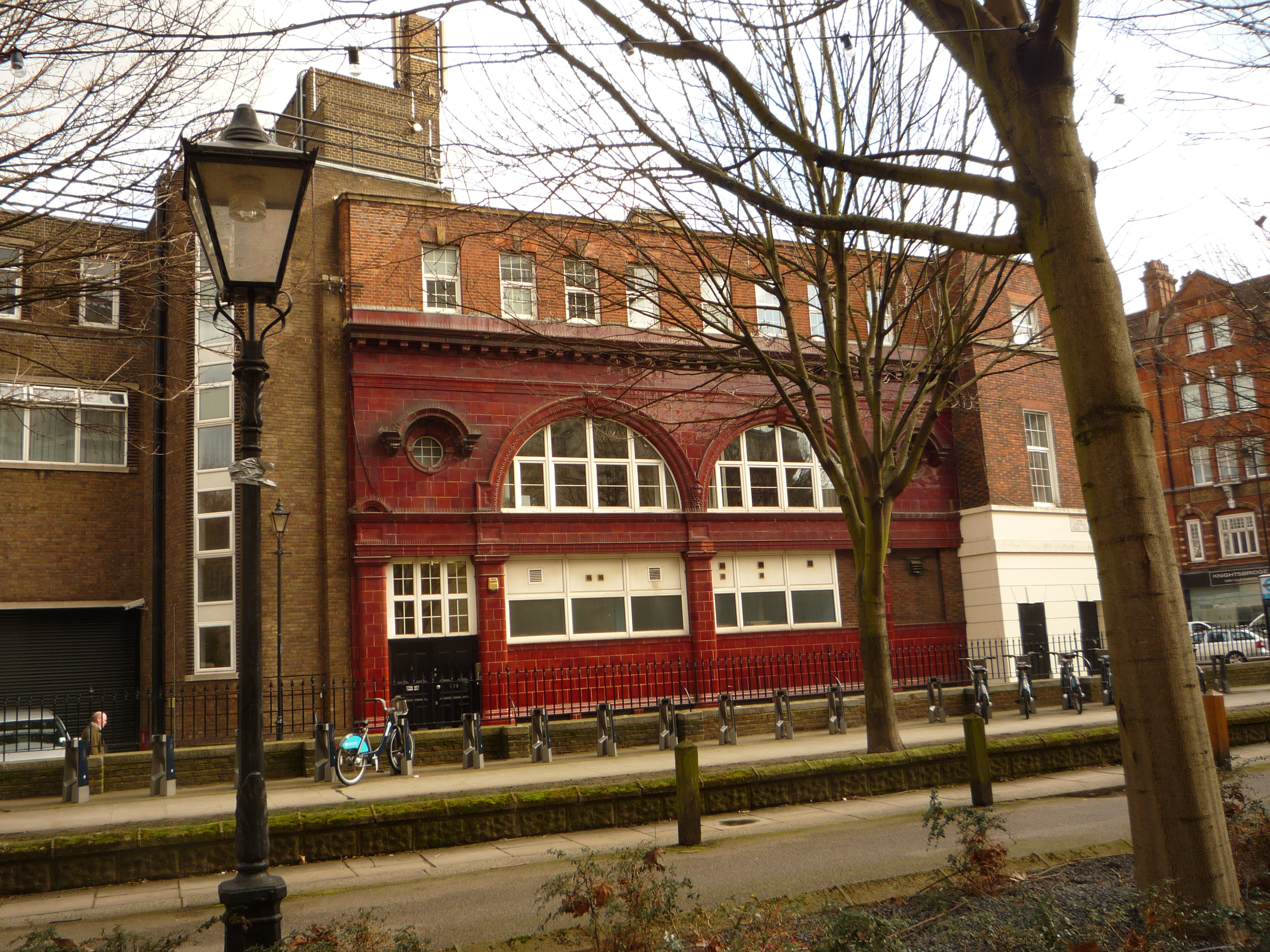
206 Brompton Road, the former Brompton Road tube station closed in 1934, used as the headquarters of the London Inner Artillery Zone AA defences during World War II.

=== Order of Battle 1943–44 ===
When they were first established, there was much interchange of the units allocated to 1 and 2 AA Groups, but from early 1943, 1 AA Group had the following order of battle (temporary attachments omitted):

- 26 (London) AA Brigade
  - 111 Heavy AA (HAA) Regiment, Royal Artillery (RA) – to 21st Army Group by August 1943
  - 132 (Mixed) HAA Regiment, RA – to 2 AA Gp July 1944
  - 137 (Mixed) HAA Regiment, RA
  - 156 (Mixed) HAA Regiment, RA
- 48 AA Brigade
  - 117 HAA Regiment, RA – from Orkney and Shetland Defences (OSDEF) October 1943; to 2 AA Gp May 1944
  - 141 (Mixed) HAA Regiment, RA – to 7 AA Gp December 1943
  - 155 (Mixed) HAA Regiment, RA
  - 160 (Mixed) HAA Regiment, RA – from 2 AA Gp by March 1944
  - 163 (Mixed) HAA Regiment, RA
  - 164 (Mixed) HAA Regiment, RA – left October 1943
- 49 AA Brigade
  - 141 Light AA (LAA) Regiment, RA – to Gibraltar August 1943
  - 26 (London Electrical Engineers) (Mixed) Searchlight (S/L) Regiment, RA
  - 80 S/L Regiment, RA – from 4 AA Gp by April 1944
  - 1 (Mixed) AA 'Z' Regiment, RA
  - 6 AA 'Z' Regiment, RA – to 37 AA Bde August 1943
  - 14 AA 'Z' Regiment, RA – to 4 AA Gp April 1943
  - 19 (Mixed) AA 'Z' Regiment, RA
- 301 Gun Operations Room (GOR), Stanmore
- 601 GOR, Brompton Road
- 1 AA Group School, Chelmsford
- 1 AA Group (Mixed) Practice Camp
- 1 AA Group Mixed Signal Unit, Royal Corps of Signals (RCS), Uxbridge
  - 1 Mixed Signal Company
    - 1 AA Command Mixed Signal Office Section (under AA Command)
    - 1 AA Group Mixed Signal Office Section
    - 26 AA Bde Mixed Signal Office Section
    - 48 AA Bde Mixed Signal Office Section
    - 49 AA Bde Mixed Signal Office Section
    - 4 AA Line Maintenance Section
  - 2 Mixed Signal Company
    - 301 GOR Mixed Signal Section
    - 601 GOR Mixed Signal Section
    - 5 AA Line Maintenance Section
- HQ 1 AA Group Royal Army Service Corps (RASC)
  - 900, 902, 907 AA (M) Transport Companies
  - 919, 921 AA (M) Transport Companies – joined November 1943
- 1 AA Group Royal Army Medical Corps (RAMC) Company
- 1 AA Group Royal Army Ordnance Corps (RAOC)
- 10 AA Workshop Battalion, Royal Electrical and Mechanical Engineers (REME)
  - 1, 6 AA Workshop Companies
  - 1 AA Group Radio Maintenance Company – later divided into 101 and 102 Radio Maintenance Detachments; joined by 105 Detachment June 1944

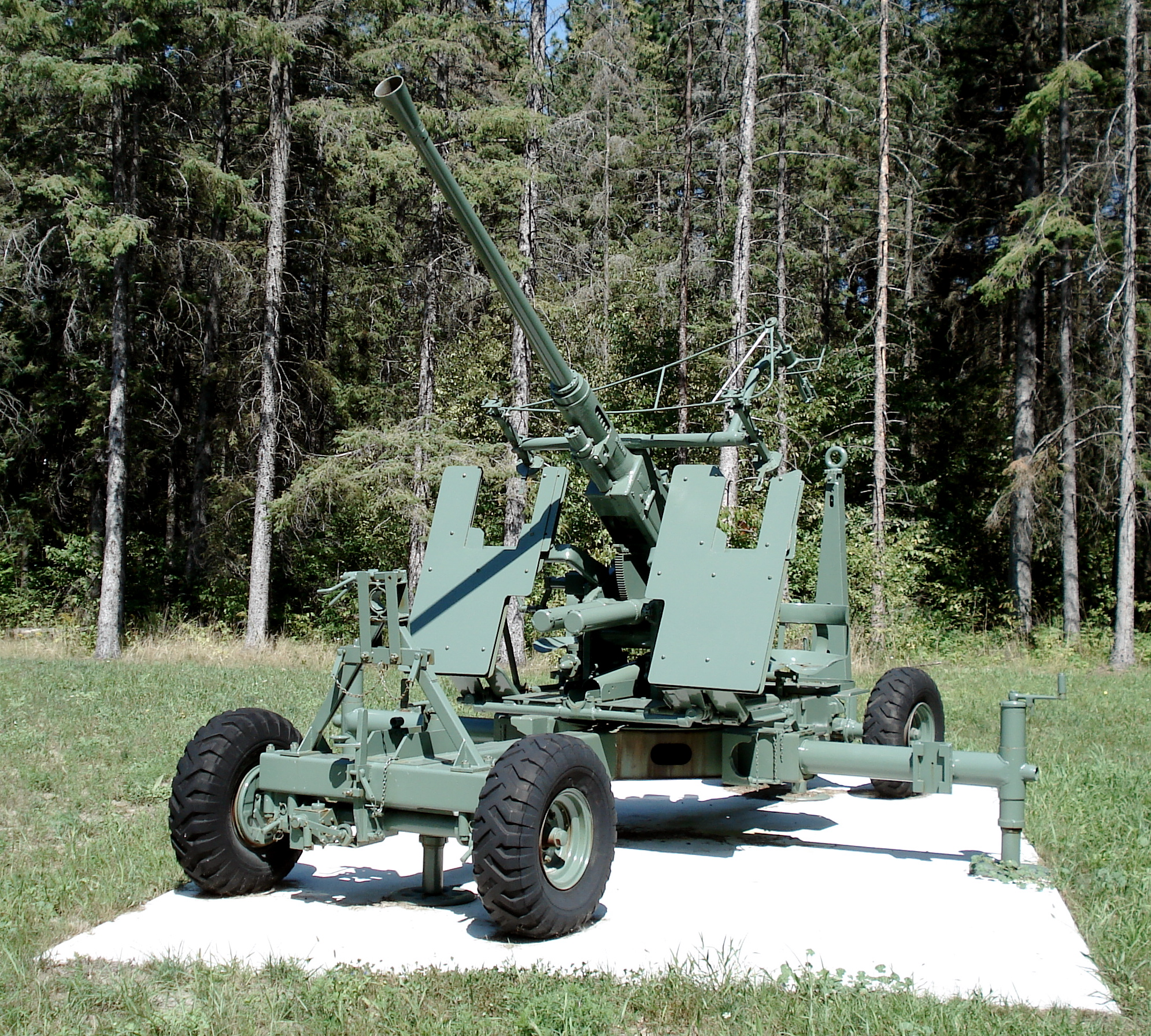
40 mm Bofors Mk 1 LAA gun.

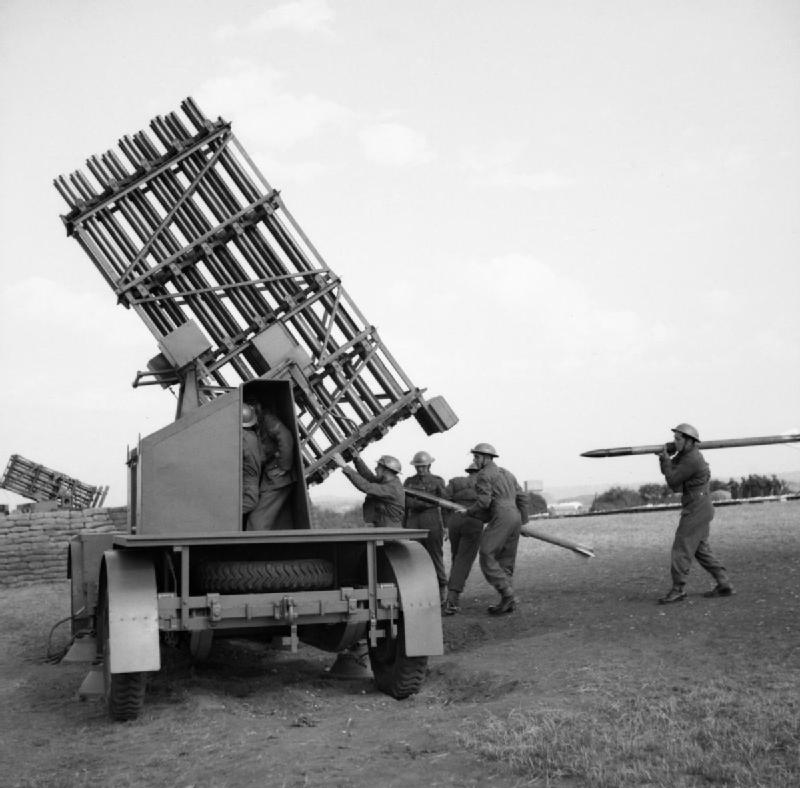
Mobile Z Battery nine-rocket launcher.

'Mixed' indicates that women of the Auxiliary Territorial Service (ATS) were integrated into the unit. HAA regiments were equipped with 3.7-inch guns, LAA regiments with Bofors 40 mm guns, 'Z' Regiments with Z Battery rocket projectors, and S/L regiments with a variety of searchlights and Light machine guns.

By August 1943, the Group had taken over control of two further AA brigades, with the associated signal units:

- 28 (Thames & Medway) AA Bde – 'Thames South'
  - 148 (M) HAA Regiment
  - 159 (M) HAA Regiment – to 4 AA Gp October 1943
  - 169 (M) HAA Regiment – from 4 AA Gp October 1943
  - 132 LAA Regiment
  - 12 (M) AA 'Z' Regiment – disbanded November 1943
  - 328 GOR, Fort Luton
- 37 AA Bde – 'Thames North'
  - 121 HAA Regiment – to 21st Army Group by September 1943
  - 136 HAA Regiment – to 2 AA Gp August 1943
  - 167 (M) HAA Regiment – to 4 AA Gp by September 1943; returned May 1944
  - 184 (M) HAA Regiment – new unit joined by September 1943
  - 137 LAA Regiment – from 3 AA Gp December 1943
  - 6 AA 'Z' Regiment – from 49 AA Bde August 1943; to 26 AA Bde August 1944
  - 329 GOR, Vange
- 3 Mixed Signal Co
  - 28 AA Bde Mixed Signal Office Section
  - 328 GOR Mixed Signal Section
  - 37 AA Bde Mixed Signal Office Section
  - 329 GOR Mixed Signal Section
  - 15 AA Line Maintenance Section

Z Regiments were termed 'AA Area Mixed Regiments' from April 1944, by which time they were largely operated by ATS and Home Guard personnel.

=== Baby Blitz ===
The Luftwaffe carried out few bombing raids on London during 1943, preferring to concentrate on 'hit and run' attacks by Fighter-bombers against coastal targets. However, in January 1944, it resumed night raids on London, which became known as the 'Baby Blitz'. These raids employed new, faster bombers with sophisticated 'pathfinder' techniques and radar jamming. For example, on the night of 21 January, 200 hostile aircraft were plotted approaching the South Coast in two waves, which intermingled with returning aircraft of RAF Bomber Command. This caused problems of identification and restrictions on fire, but the guns of 2 AA Group and then 1 AA Group engaged as the raiders approached London. Only one-fifth of the raiders reached the city, the remainder turning away to bomb open country. AA guns brought down eight aircraft and RAF Night fighters with S/L assistance also had successes.

At the end of January, London Docks received a 130-strong raid dropping flares and incendiaries as they had in the London Blitz of 1940–41: about one-third reached their target and five were shot down. February began with a 75-strong raid, of which only 12 reached the IAZ and four were shot down. On 13 February, only six out of 115 bombers reached London. The climax came with five raids in the week of 18–25 February varying from 100 to 140 in strength. These met intense AA fire from the Thames Estuary onwards and fewer than half made it to central London: the AA score was 13 shot down while the night fighters and S/Ls added 15, with another shared.

Facing these casualty rates, the Luftwaffe switched to targets away from London until 24 March, when a 100-strong raid on London lost four aircraft, and finally on 18 April a raid of 125 aircraft lost 14 shot down and only 30 reached the IAZ. Although much damage was caused in London, the rising efficiency of the HAA guns and radar made the enemy's losses unsustainable.

By February 1944, 1 AA Gp was responsible for the AA Operations Room at Brompton Road and the following GORs:

- 301 Stanmore;
- 320 Hastings;
- 329 Vange;
- 330 Chelmsford;

together with a number of ordnance depots and miscellaneous establishments, including the AA Command Staff Duties School, Research Workshops and Camouflage Experimental Section, and 37 Radio Installation Detachment. In May 1944, the group was joined by 99 Group, Pioneer Corps, with 801, 809, 814, 817, 818, 841 and 844 semi-mobile smoke companies (in August 801 and 841 Companies were replaced by 4 Company, Non-Combatant Corps).

=== Operation Diver ===
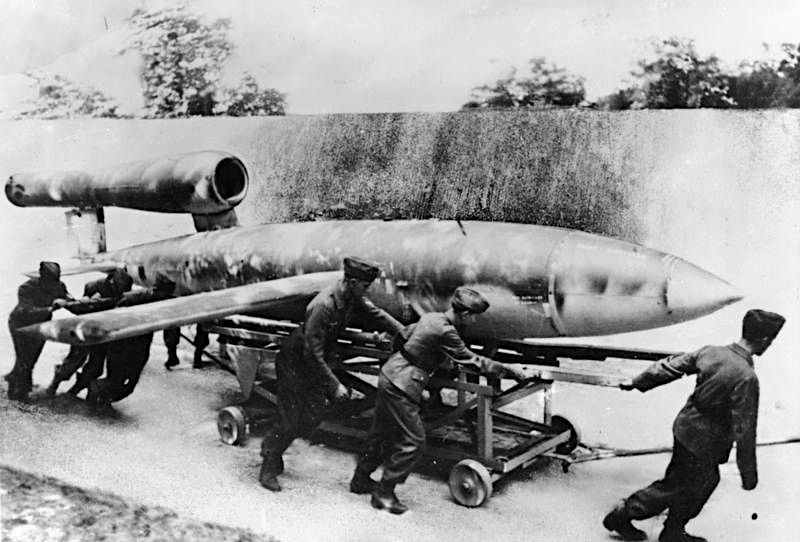
Ground crew prepare a V-1 for launch.

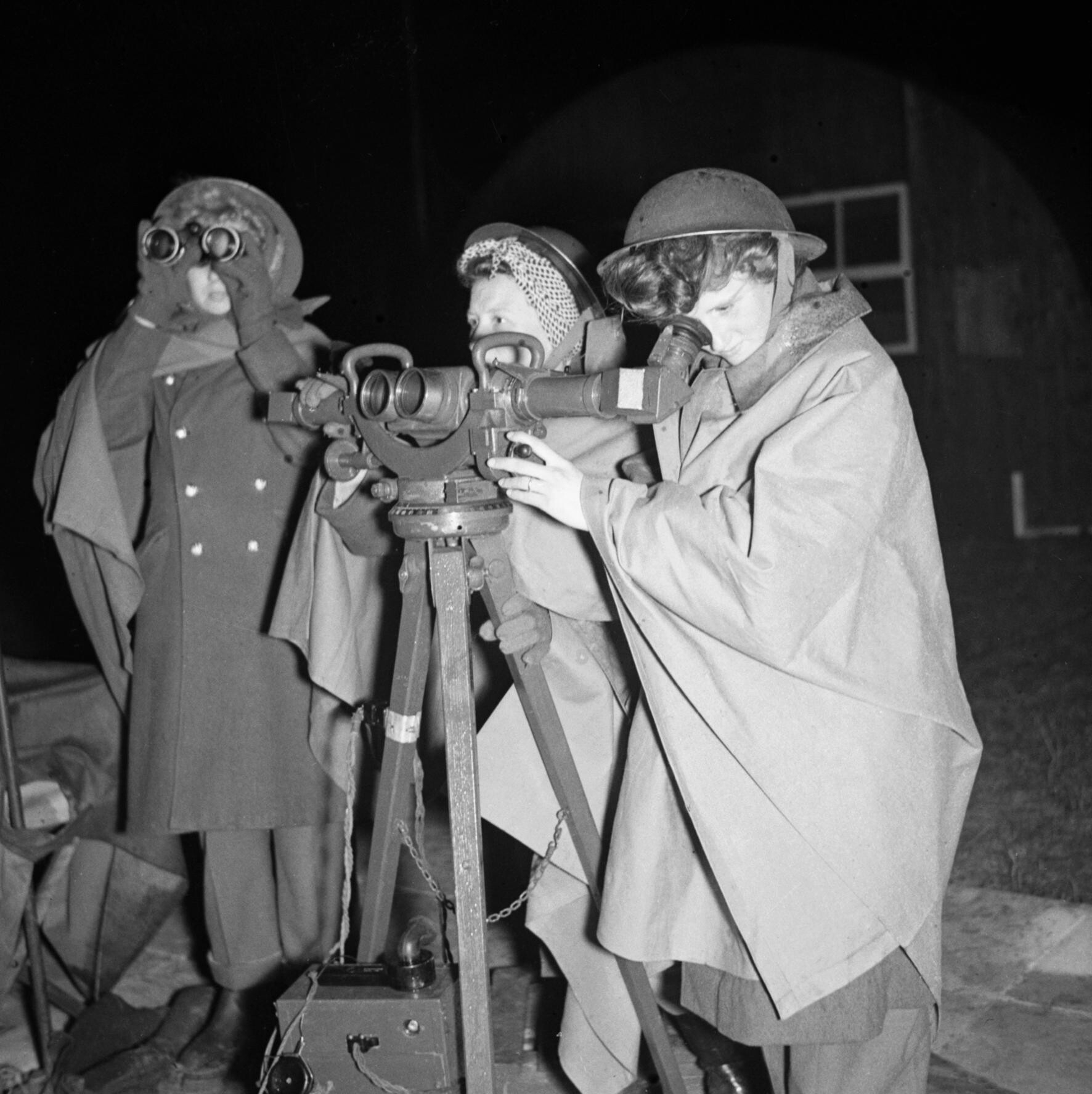
ATS members operating an AA identification telescope at a 3.7-inch gun site firing against V-1 flying bombs, 21 July 1944.

AA Command had been steadily losing men and units to the build-up of 21st Army Group for the planned Allied invasion of Europe (Operation Overlord). In April 1944, while the Baby Blitz was still under way, it was ordered to deploy much of its strength to defend the Overlord concentration areas and embarkation ports. In addition, it was preparing for the anticipated arrival of V-1 flying bombs, codenamed 'Divers'. In the event, the first of these did not arrive over England until a week after the D Day landings had begun, and AA units were able to redeploy from their Overlord sites to begin Operation Diver. However, early results of AA fire by 1 and 2 AA Groups against the small, fast, low-flying missiles were disappointing. Even shooting down those that reached the IAZ caused significant damage, so a ban was imposed on fire in this area.

At the end of June, Lt Gen Frederick Pile ordered a change in AA Command's tactics: instead of deploying mobile 3.7-inch guns in the Diver Belt, the most up-to-date power-controlled static guns, radars and predictors would be used, which involved a massive redeployment of guns uprooted from all over Britain and emplaced on temporary 'Pile Platforms'. The task was made bigger by the decision to move the Diver Belts to the coast itself, giving the guns a free fire zone out to sea. On 16 July, 1 AA Group was ordered to form a 'Diver Box' of gun defences across the Thames Estuary, forward of a line from Chelmsford in Essex to Chatham, Kent. The removal of so many guns, and the silencing of those remaining in the IAZ, led Londoners to believe that the city was being defended by the RAF alone.

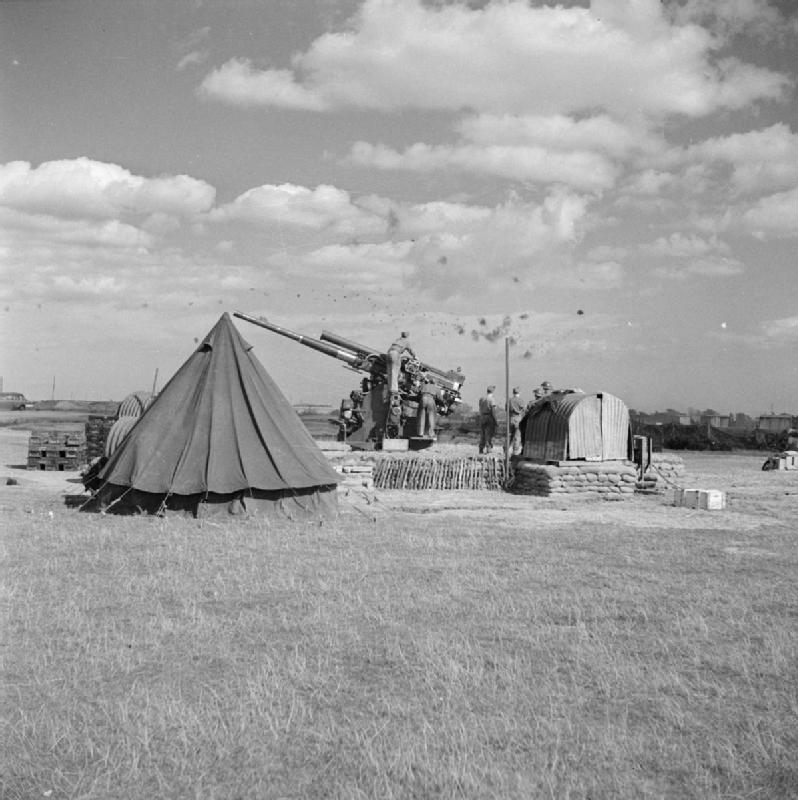
3.7-inch HAA gun in action near London, 29 August 1944 (note AA shell bursts in the distance).

As 21st Army Group began to overrun the V-1 launching sites in Northern France, the Luftwaffe turned to launching the missiles from aircraft over the North Sea, and 1 AA Group's Diver Box was heavily engaged. It was equipped with 136 Mark IIC 3.7-inch guns with No 10 Predictors and SCR-584 radar (some manned by three US Army AA Artillery battalions), 210 Bofors guns, and two Z Batteries of mobile nine-rocket launchers manned by a converted S/L regiment. The HAA guns began using the proximity VT fuze with great success. A number of the guns were mounted on the Maunsell Forts in the Thames Estuary. In addition there were 400 20mm guns provided by the RAF Regiment and the Royal Navy. To control these guns, the Box was divided into four sectors under 37, 49, 56 and 68 AA Brigades.

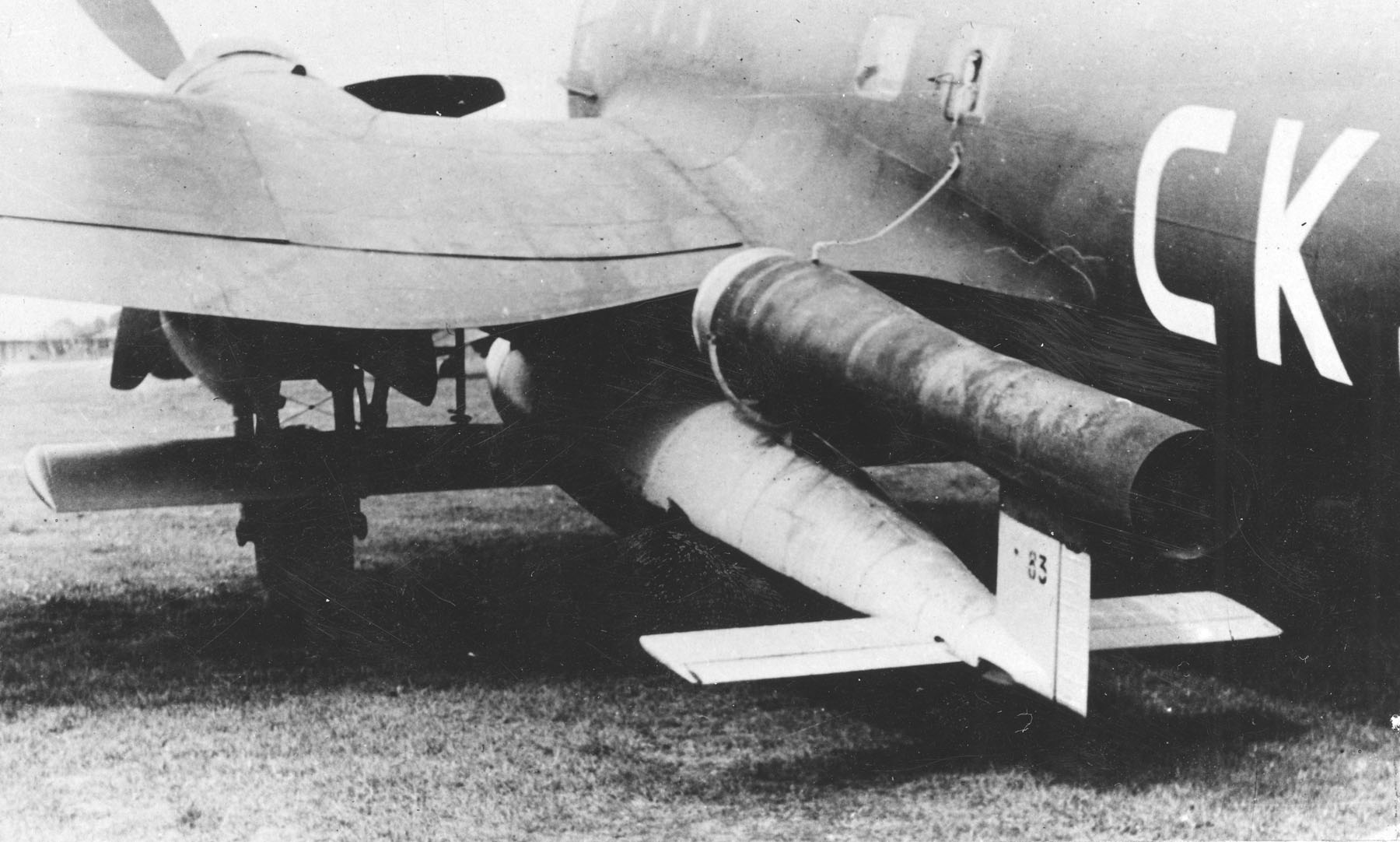
A Heinkel He 111 H-22 carrying a V-1 flying bomb.

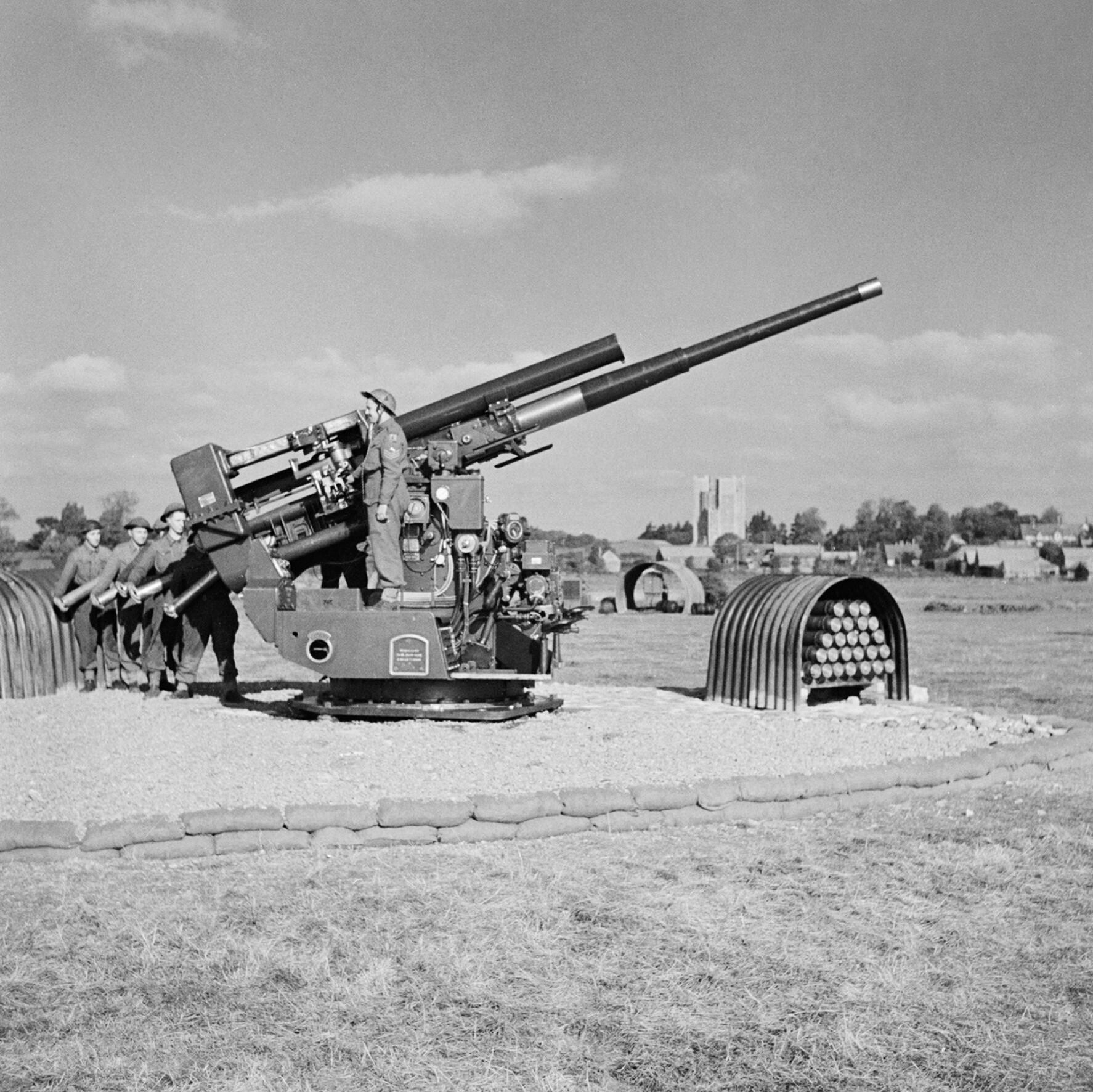
Static 3.7-inch HAA gun on a Pile Platform in action in Essex, 9 October 1944.

Success rates for AA Command began to rise during this second Diver deployment: from a 9 per cent success rate in July, the average rose to over 50 per cent. On one day, 68 missiles were destroyed out of 96 plotted. The weekly total of missiles reaching London fell from a peak of 362 in July to 100, then down to 10 in September. A further redeployment of guns from the South Coast through London to the East Coast was ordered on 21 September. 3 AA Group HQ was brought from Bristol to take over command of the London IAZ, and a new 9 AA Group took over East Anglia, leaving 1 AA Group to concentrate on the Diver Box and the Thames/Medway and Dover defences (though this was still a massive command temporarily controlling 10 AA brigades). The second phase of V-1 attacks ended in mid-January 1945. AA Command's success rate in this phase was impressive: out of a total of 492 V-1 targets, 320 were shot down, and only 13 reached London.

=== Order of Battle late 1944 ===
From mid-October 1944, 1 AA Group had the following order of battle:

- 5 AA Bde
  - 1 HAA regiment; 3 LAA regiments
- 26 AA Bde
  - 4 HAA regiments; 1 AA area mixed regiment
- 28 AA Bde
  - 2 HAA regiments; 2 LAA regiments
- 37 AA Brigade
  - 4 HAA regiments; 3 LAA regiments
- 40 AA Bde
  - 4 HAA regiments; 2 LAA regiments
- 48 AA Brigade
  - 2 HAA regiments
- 49 AA Brigade
  - 2 S/L regiments; 2 AA area mixed regiments
- 56 AA Brigade
  - 6 S/L regiments
- 57 AA Brigade
  - 2 HAA regiments; 3 LAA regiments
- 102 AA Brigade
  - 1 HAA regiment; 4 LAA regiments

In October 1944, 1 AA Group's HQ establishment comprised 49 officers, 27 male other ranks, and 105 ATS personnel. Maj-Gen Tremlett was replaced by Maj-Gen Roger Reynolds on 1 November 1944.

=== Order of Battle 1945 ===
From mid-December, when the worst of the V-1 threat to London had receded and AA Command was being forced to supply manpower to 21st Army Group fighting in NW Europe, 1 AA Group had the following reduced order of battle:

- 26 AA Bde
  - 119 HAA Regiment – from 9 AA Gp March 1945
  - 135 (M) HAA Regiment – from 6 AA Gp by February 1945
  - 153 (M) HAA Regiment
  - 156 (M) HAA Regiment
  - 157 (M) HAA Regiment – to 9 AA Gp by February 1945
  - 162 (M) HAA Regiment
  - 163 (M) HAA Regiment – to 48 AA Bde December 1944
  - 171 (M) HAA Regiment – to 48 AA Bde December 1944
  - 6 AA Area Mixed Regiment
- 48 AA Bde
  - 130 (M) HAA Regiment
  - 160 (M) HAA Regiment
- 49 AA Bde
  - 26 (LEE) (M) S/L Regiment
  - 64 (Essex Regiment) S/L Regiment – converted into 639 Infantry Regiment, RA, for 21st Army Group January 1945
  - 93 (M) S/L Regiment – from 2 AA Gp by February 1945
  - 1 AA Area Mixed Regiment – to 26 AA Bde by February 1945
  - 19 AA Area Mixed Regiment – to 26 AA Bde by February 1945
- 601 GOR
- 1 AA Group HAA Training Centre – formed April 1945
- 5 Area AA Maintenance Regiment – formed April 1945
- HQ 1 AA Group (M) Signal Unit
  - 1 & 2 (M) Signal Cos
- HQ 1 AA Group RASC
  - 195, 900, 902 AA (M) Transport Cos
- 1 AA Group RAMC Co
- 1 AA Group RAOC
- HQ 10 AA Workshop Bn, REME
  - 1, 3, 15 AA Workshop Cos
  - 37 'R' Installation Det
  - 101, 105 Radio Maintenance Dets
- AA Command Research Workshop
- AA Command Physical Training Pool
- AA Command Staff Duties School
- AA Command School of Technical Instruction

The Home Guard was stood down in December 1944 and most of the Z Batteries were disbanded; the AA area regiments were disbanded in April 1945, becoming area maintenance units. After VE Day, 1 AA Group reverted to almost its original organisation, with 26, 28, 37 and 28 AA Bdes under command. As demobilisation progressed, some of the war-formed regiments were replaced by Regular Army units returned from overseas deployments.

== Cold War ==
1 AA Group was commanded in 1946–47 by Maj-Gen William Revell-Smith, who had been Major-General AA of 21st Army Group during the campaign in North West Europe.

When the Regular Army and Territorial Army (TA) were reorganised for postwar needs in 1947, 1 AA Group was given responsibility for London, the Thames and Medway, Harwich and Dover.

=== Order of Battle 1947 ===
The 10 Year Plan for AA defence, drawn up in 1947, laid down the following order of battle for 1 AA Group:

- 1 AA Brigade, Edenbridge, Kent (Regular)
  - 30 LAA Regiment – converted to HAA September 1948; to British Army of the Rhine March 1951
  - 90 LAA Regiment – disbanded September 1948
  - 95 HAA Regiment – became 65 HAA Regiment September 1948
  - 1 & 9 Fire Control (FC) Troops
- 6 AA Brigade, Brentwood, Essex (Regular)
  - 57 HAA Regiment
  - 100 HAA Regiment – disbanded September 1948
  - 107 HAA Regiment – disbanded July 1947
  - 30 FC Trp
- 7 AA Brigade, Orsett (Regular)
  - 85 LAA Regiment – disbanded September 1948
  - 89 HAA Regiment – disbanded July 1948
  - 99 HAA Regiment – disbanded October 1948
  - 8 FC Trp
- 11 AA Brigade, Shoeburyness (Regular)
  - 63 HAA Regiment
  - 75 HAA Regiment
  - 98 HAA Regiment – disbanded August 1948
  - 6 & 7 FC Trps
- 15 AA Brigade, Woolwich (Regular)
  - 101 (M) HAA Regiment – disbanded June 1948
  - 102 HAA Regiment – disbanded October 1948
  - 103 HAA Regiment – disbanded September 1948
- 52 (London) AA Brigade, Chingford (TA)
  - 459 (Essex Regiment) (M) HAA Regiment, Walthamstow
  - 512 (Finsbury Rifles) LAA Regiment, Pentonville
  - 568 (St Pancras) S/L Regiment, St Pancras, London
  - 52 FC Trp
- 53 (Home Counties) AA Brigade, Dover (TA)
  - 259 (Home Counties) (Cinque Ports) (Mobile) HAA Regiment, Shorncliffe
  - 489 (Cinque Ports) (Mobile) HAA Regiment, Ramsgate
  - 516 (Kent) LAA Regiment, Sittingbourne
  - 53 FC Trp
- 54 (Thames & Medway) AA Brigade, Gillingham, Kent (TA)
  - 455 (Kent) (M) HAA Regiment, Tunbridge Wells
  - 458 (Kent) (M) HAA Regiment, Sidcup
  - 564 (Kent) LAA/SL Regiment, Gillingham
  - 608 (Kent) (M) HAA Regiment, Bexleyheath
  - 54 FC Trp
- 55 (East Anglian) AA Brigade, Barking, London (TA)
  - 482 (Essex) (M) HAA Regiment, Barking
  - 517 (Essex) LAA Regiment, Dagenham
  - 530 (Essex) LAA Regiment, Colchester
  - 563 (28th Essex) SL Regiment, Whipps Cross
  - 599 (Essex Regiment) (Mobile) HAA Regiment, Chingford
  - 600 (Essex Regiment) (Mobile) HAA Regiment, East Ham
  - 55 FC Trp
- 63 (North London) AA Brigade, London NW1 (TA)
  - 461 (Middlesex) (Mobile) HAA Regiment, Finchley
  - 484 (Middlesex) (M) HAA Regiment, Willesden
  - 490 (Middlesex) (M) HAA Regiment, Southgate, London
  - 609 (Tottenham) (M) HAA Regiment, Tottenham
  - 63 FC Trp
- 64 AA Brigade, Clapham (TA)
  - 451 (Chelsea) HAA Regiment, Chelsea, London
  - 497 (Hammersmith) HAA Regiment, Hammersmith
  - 499 (London Welsh) (M) HAA Regiment, Kensington
  - 562 (27th London Electrical Engineers) S/L Regiment, Streatham
  - 570 (First Surrey Rifles) LAA Regiment, Dulwich
  - 64 FC Trp
- 67 AA Brigade, Shepherds Bush (TA)
  - 452 (London) HAA Regiment, Acton, London
  - 453 (City of London) HAA Regiment, Shepherd's Bush
  - 454 (City of London) HAA Regiment, Putney
  - 488 HAA Regiment, White City, London
  - 607 (Middlesex) S/L Regiment, Twickenham
  - 67 FC Trp
- 75 AA Brigade, London SE3 (TA)
  - 2 (Honourable Artillery Company) LAA Regiment, Finsbury
  - 460 (City of London) HAA Regiment, Catford
  - 566 (City of London Rifles) LAA Regiment, Sutton, London
  - 567 (7th City of London) S/L Regiment, Shoreditch
  - 569 (The Queen's Own) S/L Regiment, Blackheath, London
  - 75 FC Trp
- 82 AA Brigade, Heston (TA)
  - 479 (Hertfordshire Yeomanry) HAA Regiment, Barnet
  - 571 (Middlesex) LAA/SL Regiment, Edgware
  - 593 (Harrow) (M) HAA Regiment, Harrow, London
  - 595 (9th Battalion Middlesex Regiment) LAA Regiment, Kingsbury, London
  - 604 (Royal Fusiliers) S/L Regiment, Wembley
  - 610 (Middlesex) LAA Regiment, Cowley, London
  - 82 FC Trp
- 106 AA Brigade, Kingston upon Thames (TA)
  - 536 (Surrey) LAA Regiment, Chertsey
  - 565 (Surrey) LAA/SL Regiment, Kingston
  - 598 (4th Battalion The Queen's Royal Regiment) LAA Regiment, Croydon
  - 605 (Sussex) (Mobile) HAA Regiment, Brighton
  - 641 (Sussex) HAA Regiment, Worthing
  - 106 FC Trp
- 11 AA (M) Signal Regiment, RCS, Kensington
  - 1 AA Group (M) Signal Sqn
- 1 AA Group (North) Transport Column, RASC, White City
  - 902 Company, White City
  - 903 Company, Mile End Road
  - 917 Company – to South Transport Column 1951
  - 919 (AA) (M) Company, Barking
  - 927 Company, Norwich
  - 1932 Company, Stanford-le-Hope
- 1 AA Group (South) Transport Column, RASC, Wandsworth
  - 900 Company, Wandsworth
  - 901 Company, Richmond upon Thames
  - 921 Company, Plumstead
  - 1933 (Tractor) Company
- 1 AA Group Ordnance Company, RAOC
- 6 AA Workshop Battalion, REME

(M) indicates a 'Mixed' unit including members of the Women's Royal Army Corps.

=== Disbandment ===
The 1947 plan was never fully implemented, and most of the Regular units assigned to AA Command were disbanded as part of postwar demobilisation. As the Cold War developed, there was a need for new weapons, leading to the rise of Surface-to-air missiles and 'blind fire' radar control, with the consequent decline of HAA guns and searchlights. There was also political pressure for defence budget cuts. In March 1955, AA Command and its groups were disbanded and the remaining AA defence units in the UK came under control of the Home Commands and Districts. 1 AA Group completed its disbandment on 31 October 1955.

== External sources ==
- British Army units from 1945 on
- Generals of World War II
- Graham Watson, The Territorial Army 1947
