= 28th (Thames and Medway) Anti-Aircraft Brigade =

Former British Territorial Army formation

28th (Thames & Medway) AA Brigade 54 (Thames & Medway) AA Brigade
- Active: 1925 – 1946; 1947 – September 1948
- Country: United Kingdom
- Branch: Territorial Army
- Type: Anti-Aircraft Brigade
- Role: Air Defence
- Part of: 1st AA Division; 6th AA Division; 1 AA Group; 9 AA Group
- Garrison/HQ: Medway Towns
- Engagements: Battle of Britain; The Blitz; Baby Blitz; Operation Diver

28th (Thames and Medway) Anti-Aircraft Brigade (28 AA Bde) was an air defence formation of the British Territorial Army created in 1925 to command anti-aircraft units in Kent and around the militarily important Medway Towns, which it defended during the Second World War. In 1940 the brigade was responsible for the defences on the south side of the Thames Estuary including the Royal Naval Dockyard at Chatham and the Port of Dover. The brigade was heavily engaged throughout the Battle of Britain, in the summer of 1940, and The Blitz, from autumn 1940 to spring 1941, operating a total of 70 heavy anti-aircraft (HAA) guns controlled from a gun operations room (GOR) at Chatham. During 1942 many of the brigade's experienced units were transferred to active theatres overseas. Increasingly the brigade included women of the Auxiliary Territorial Service (ATS).

From mid-1944 the German Luftwaffe began launching V-1 flying bombs against southeast England, whose speed and maneuverability made them hard for AA guns to destroy. As a result, the brigade was repositioned along the South Coast as part of a concentration of AA guns under Operation Diver to target V-1s coming in over the English Channel. As the launching sites in France were overrun by 21st Army Group by late 1944, the Luftwaffe switched to air-launching V-1s over the North Sea, forcing another redeployment to the east of London.

The brigade was formally disbanded in 1946, following the end of the war. It was reformed in 1947 as 54 (Thames and Medway) AA Brigade, but permanently disbanded in 1948.

== Interwar period ==
German air raids by Zeppelin airships and Gotha bombers on London and other British cities during the First World War had shown the need for strong anti-aircraft (AA) defences in any future war. When the Territorial Army (TA) was reformed in the 1920s it included a number of dedicated AA units of the Royal Artillery (RA) and Royal Engineers (RE). At first these were concentrated in London under 26th and 27th Air Defence Brigades. In 1925 55th (Kent) Anti-Aircraft Brigade, RA was formed to defend the Medway Towns of north Kent. 28th Air Defence Brigade (AD Bde) was then formed at Tunbridge Wells to command the AA defences in the area, even though it only had 55th AA Bde under its command, and that in turn consisted only of 163rd (Kent) AA Battery at Tunbridge Wells. There were also 313 and 314 independent AA searchlight companies of the RE (TA) in Kent, but these were not formally subordinated to 28 AD Bde at this time.

At first, 28th AD Bde was subordinate to the Home Counties Area of Eastern Command, but as Britain's AA defences expanded during the 1930s, higher formations became necessary. 1st AA Division was formed to cover London and the Home Counties on 15 December 1935. The 28th ADB was reorganised as 28th (Thames & Medway) Anti-Aircraft Group, based at Kitchener Barracks, Chatham, and commanding all the gun and searchlight units in the area.

=== Order of Battle 1935 ===
The composition of 28 AA Group in December 1935 was as follows:

- 55th (Kent) Anti-Aircraft Brigade, RA (TA)
  - HQ at Fort Clarence, Rochester
  - 163rd (Kent) Anti-Aircraft Battery at Tunbridge Wells
  - 166th (City of Rochester) Anti-Aircraft Battery at Fort Clarence, Rochester
  - 205th (Chatham and Faversham) Anti-Aircraft Battery at Chatham
- 58th (Kent) Anti-Aircraft Brigade. A RA (TA) HAA gun unit formed in 1935 by conversion of 52nd (Kent) Medium Brigade, Royal Artillery
  - HQ at Erith
  - 206th (Erith) Anti-Aircraft Battery at Erith
  - 207th (Erith) Anti-Aircraft Battery at Erith
  - 208th (Bromley) Anti-Aircraft Battery at Penge
- 61st (Finsbury Rifles) Anti-Aircraft Brigade, RA (TA). An AA unit formed in 1935 by conversion of 11th Battalion, the London Regiment (Finsbury Rifles), affiliated to the Middlesex Regiment.
  - HQ at Pentonville
  - 170th Anti-Aircraft Machine Gun Battery at Finchley
  - 171st Anti-Aircraft Machine Gun Battery at Pentonville
  - 195th Anti-Aircraft Machine Gun Battery at Finchley
  - 272nd Anti-Aircraft Battery added later at Southgate
- 29th (Kent) Anti-Aircraft Battalion, RE (TA). Formed in 1935 from the Kent and Middlesex Group Anti-Aircraft Searchlight Companies, Royal Engineers.
  - HQ at Marine School, Chatham
  - 313th (Kent) Anti-Aircraft Company at Chatham
  - 314th (Kent) Anti-Aircraft Company at Tonbridge
  - 322nd Anti-Aircraft Company at Greenhithe
  - 347th (Kent) Anti-Aircraft Company at Sidcup
- 32nd (7th City of London) Anti-Aircraft Battalion, RE (TA). A searchlight unit formed in 1935 by conversion of 7th London Regiment (Post Office Rifles) affiliated to the Middlesex Regiment
  - HQ at Finsbury Square
  - 328th Anti-Aircraft Company at Finsbury Square
  - 329th Anti-Aircraft Company at Grove Park, Lewisham
  - 330th Anti-Aircraft Company at Grove Park
  - 331st Anti-Aircraft Company at Bexleyheath

The 28th and other anti-aircraft groups adopted the more normal formation title of 'Brigades' after the Royal Artillery redesignated its Brigades as "Regiments" in 1938.

== Mobilisation ==
=== Order of Battle 1939 ===
By the outbreak of the Second World War on 3 September 1939 the London and searchlight units had left 28th AA Bde, which was now entirely composed of heavy AA artillery regiments based in Kent. It was serving in 6 AA Division, which was formed on 30 May 1939 to take responsibility for the air defence of the Thames Estuary, Essex and Kent.

- 55th (Kent) Anti-Aircraft Regiment, RA
  - New 307th Battery formed at Tunbridge Wells
  - 205th Battery transferred to 89th HAA Regiment
- 58th (Kent) Anti-Aircraft Regiment, RA
  - New 264th Battery formed at Dartford
- 75th (Home Counties) (Cinque Ports) Anti-Aircraft Regiment, RA (TA). HAA Regiment converted from field artillery in 1938.
  - HQ at Dover
  - 223rd (Cinque Ports) Battery at Folkestone
  - 233rd (Kent) Battery at Dover
  - 306th Battery at Ashford, Kent
- 89th (Cinque Ports) Anti-Aircraft Regiment, RA (TA). HAA Regiment raised as duplicate of 75th AA Rgt in April 1939
  - HQ at Sittingbourne
  - 205th (Kent) Battery at Sittingbourne (from 55th (Kent) AA Regiment)
  - 234th (Kent) Battery at Deal
  - 235th (Kent) Battery at Margate

== Early War ==
Opportunities for action were rare during the Phoney War, but on the night of 22/23 November 1939 the HAA guns of 28 AA Bde ("Thames South") combined with those of 37 AAB on the other bank of the river ("Thames North") to engage at least two German mine-laying aircraft that had strayed into the mouth of the estuary. One wrecked aircraft was found on the marshes and credited to 206 Battery of 58th HAA Regiment, based at Allhallows, Kent.

During the summer of 1940 the brigade was joined by 53rd (City of London) HAA Regiment, which had been evacuated from Marseille after abandoning its guns in the wake of the Fall of France.

28 AA Brigade was responsible for the defences on the south side of the Thames Estuary (Thames South) including the Royal Naval Dockyard at Chatham, as well as the Port of Dover. By 11 July 1940, the Thames South AA layout operated by 28 AA Bde had a total of 70 HAA guns (3.7-inch and 4.5-inch).

== Battle of Britain ==
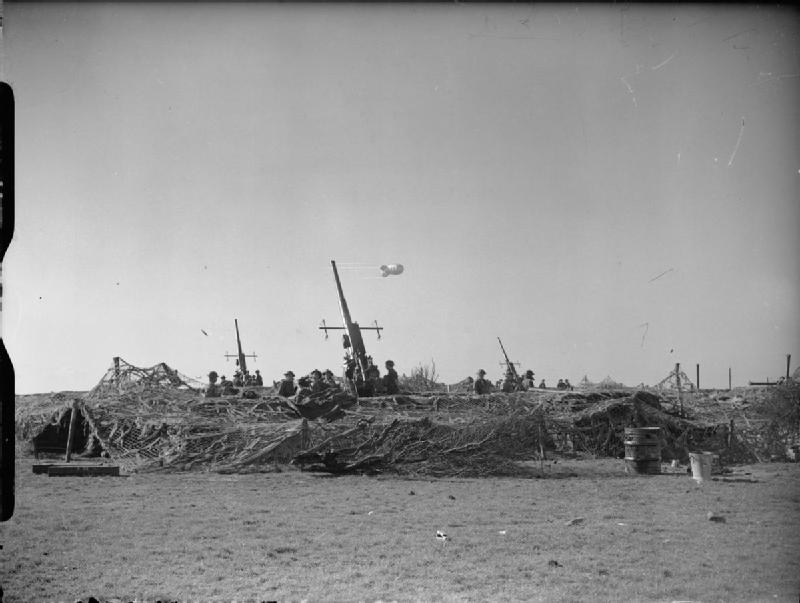
3.7-inch guns of 75th HAA Regiment at Dover, 1940.

The Luftwaffe began its 1940 bombing offensive against the British mainland with small-scale raids on coastal targets. In July 1940 it began heavy daylight raids against south coast ports and shipping; the guns at Dover were in action virtually every day. Lieutenant-Colonel N.V. Sadler of 75th HAA Regiment developed an effective system of HAA barrages over individual points in Dover Harbour and the shipping channels, underpinned by light anti-aircraft (LAA) fire. In one day the regiment claimed to have shot down 10 aircraft: seven Junkers Ju 87 'Stukas', together with two Messerschmitt Bf 109s and a Dornier Do 215. During this period 6 AA Division was placed under the operational control of No. 11 Group RAF, which remained the case for the rest of the war. Decisions as to whether or not the guns could fire were made at the lower level sector operations rooms, an army officer sat beside each fighter controller and directed the gun crews when to open and cease fire. This was to ensure that anti-aircraft guns would not be firing when British fighter aircraft were liable to be hit.

The brigade was heavily engaged throughout the Battle of Britain. On 18 August, for example, German air raids appeared over RAF airfields at West Malling, Manston, Kenley, Biggin Hill, Gravesend and the town of Sevenoaks, all within four and a half hours in the afternoon. The guns of 28 AA Bde and its neighbours were in action and claimed 23 German aircraft shot down. Four days later a mass raid flew up the Thames Estuary to attack RAF Hornchurch on the Essex shore: the raid was broken up by 28 and 37 AA Bde, and then the fighters of No. 11 Group RAF attacked. Follow-up raids were marked for the fighters by 'pointer' rounds of HAA fire. On 1 September over 200 German aircraft attacked Maidstone, Biggin Hill, Kenley and Chatham; operating in coordination with the fighters, the guns broke up the formations and claimed four aircraft shot down, but the airfields at Biggin Hill and Kenley were badly hit. Next day a mass raid arrived over the Medway and flew up the Thames towards Hornchurch. They came under heavy fire from the 3.7s and 4.5s of 28 and 37 AA Bdes and 15 were claimed as shot down before the fighters took over. On 7 September heavy raids up the estuary attacked oil wharves at Thameshaven, Tilbury Docks and Woolwich Arsenal: a total of 25 German aircraft were claimed by AA guns and fighters. In addition to aircraft shot down claimed by the gunners, they caused many losses to German aircraft which went unseen from the British side. For example, on 28 July two Junkers Ju 88 from the same German formation were damaged over the Thames Estury by anti-aircraft fire but managed to return to occupied Europe; however, both crashed on landing and were written off. Almost all the crew of both aircraft were killed or wounded.

One of the lessons the Germans learnt during the Battle of Britain was that day bombers needed to fly in tight formation for mutual protection against fighters. However, the tighter formations made easier targets for ground based guns and were more vulnerable to AA fire. On 8 September a formation of 15 Dornier Do 17s flew along the Thames at 15,000 feet. The opening salvo from a troop of four 3.7-inch guns of 28 AA Bde brought down the three leading aircraft and scattered the others in disorder; they jettisoned their bombs as they escaped. On 15 September, remembered as the zenith of the battle, the guns of 28 AA Bde were in prolonged combat, engaging German aircraft over Chatham in the morning, and again in the afternoon.

Overall, British anti-aircraft defences have been considered to have performed poorly during the Battle of Britain. They have been compared unfavourably with similar German efforts of the same period. General Frederick Pile, General Officer Commanding Anti-Aircraft Command, felt that his most effective weapon was the LAA Bofors gun, which was in short supply; as was the Kerrison Predictor, the only fully automated anti-aircraft fire-control system available for low and intermediate level anti-aircraft fire. For HAA guns, gun laying radar was not yet operational. The larger guns also suffered from a lack of operational mobility, being mostly sited in fixed concrete emplacements.

== The Blitz ==
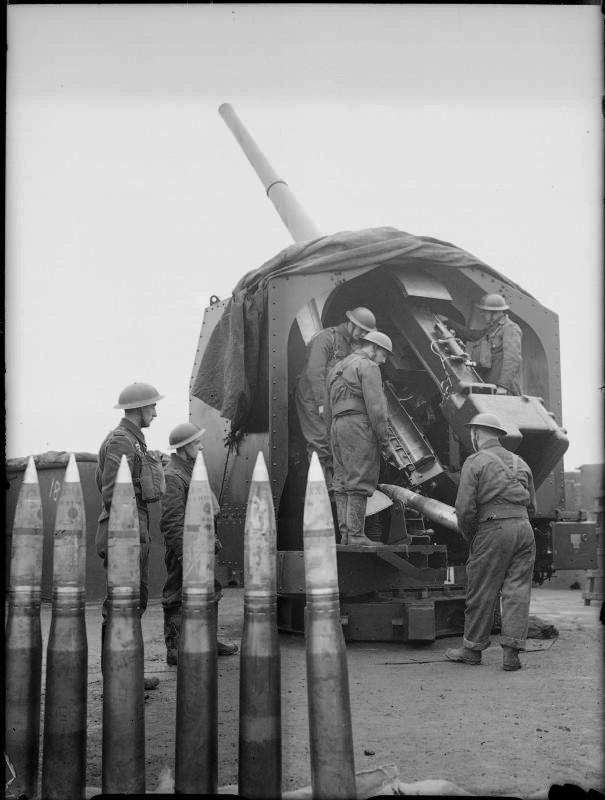
4.5 inch anti-aircraft gun and crew of 207 Battery, 58th HAA Regiment, near Sittingbourne, Kent, January 1941

After 15 September the intensity of Luftwaffe day raids declined rapidly, and it began a prolonged night bombing campaign over London and industrial towns known as The Blitz. This meant that 28 Bde was in action night after night from 7 October 1940 to the end of May 1941 as the bomber streams approached the London Inner Artillery Zone (IAZ). British night air defences were in a poor state. Few guns had fire-control systems, and the underpowered searchlights were usually ineffective against aircraft at altitudes above 12,000 ft (3,700 m). In July 1940, only 1,200 heavy and 549 light guns were deployed in the whole of Britain. Of the "heavies", some 200 were of the obsolescent 3 in (76 mm) type; the remainder were the effective 4.5 in (110 mm) and 3.7 in (94 mm) guns, with a theoretical "ceiling"' of over 30,000 ft (9,100 m) but a practical limit of 25,000 ft (7,600 m) because the predictor in use could not accept greater heights. The light guns, about half of which were of the excellent Bofors 40 mm, dealt with aircraft only up to 6,000 ft (1,800 m). Although the use of the guns improved civilian morale, with the knowledge the German bomber crews were facing the barrage, it is now believed that the anti-aircraft guns achieved little and in fact the falling shell fragments caused more British casualties on the ground.

At this time Thames South had a planned layout of 25 HAA sites (of which only 16 were occupied), controlled from a Gun Operations Room (GOR) at Chatham. It ran from Dartford to Chatham, where there was a strongly defended area containing the naval dockyards at Chatham and Sheerness and the aircraft factory at Rochester. 28 AA Bde was so stretched that 6 AA Division gave responsibility for LAA cover for Vulnerable Points (VPs) at Crayford, Northfleet, Rochester and the Isle of Grain to 56 LAA Bde. The searchlight layout in Thames South had the dual role of assisting both AA guns and night fighters. As the Blitz continued, the number of HAA guns increased and they became more effective: an average of 20,000 shells were fired each German bomber shot down in September 1940; this reduced to 4,087 in January 1941; and to 2,963 shells per kill in February 1941. This was aided by the deployment of more radar and searchlights and more effective use of them.

=== Operational research ===
One of the operational sites in Thames South, TS21, was taken over by AA Command's Operational Research Group (Note: Under Patrick Blackett.) to combat-test and develop new technologies coming forward such as gun-laying (GL) radar and searchlight control (SLC) Radar. Improved GL Mark I E/F sets began to appear in November 1940, replacing sound-location for HAA sites, and the number of rounds that were fired on average for each "kill" began to fall. The GL radar was also effective in providing target heights for fighters, and the SL batteries were able to pass these to the night fighter controllers at RAF Kenley.

=== Order of Battle, Winter 1940–41 ===
On 15 September 1940, 89th HAA Rgt was relieved of operational duties and ordered to prepare to move overseas. It sailed on 15 December for Egypt; its batteries later fought in the Battle of Crete and the Siege of Tobruk. On 24 November 1940, 75th HAA Regiment was transferred to 62 AA Bde to defend the North Midlands, but 28 AA Bde was strengthened by 90th HAA and 4th LAA regiments:

- 90th HAA Regiment, RA (TA). HAA Regiment raised at Southgate, London in April 1939.
  - 272, 284, 285 Batteries

In February 1941, 53 (City of London) HAA Regiment moved to Croydon and was transferred to the command of 48 AA Bde.

== Mid-War ==
During 1942 more of the brigade's experienced units were transferred to War Office (WO) control, trained and equipped for mobile warfare, and then sent to active theatres overseas, particularly for Operation Torch in North Africa. Sometimes they returned temporarily to AA Command while awaiting embarkation. Increasingly, the replacement HAA and support units were "Mixed", indicating that the operational personnel included women of the Auxiliary Territorial Service (ATS).

A reorganisation of AA Command in October 1942 saw the AA divisions disbanded and replaced by a smaller number of AA Groups more closely aligned with the organisation of RAF Fighter Command. 28 AA Brigade came under a new 1 AA Group covering London and the Thames Estuary.

=== Order of Battle 1941–43 ===
During this period the brigade was composed as follows (temporary attachments omitted):

- 55th (Kent) HAA Rgt to WO control Spring 1942, then to Persia and Iraq Command (PAIFORCE)
  - 163, 166, 307 HAA Btys
  - 308 HAA Bty left June 1941; became an independent battery in West Africa Command
  - 418 HAA Bty joined July 1941
- 58th (Kent) HAA Rgt to 9 AA Division Autumn 1941
  - 206, 207, 208, 264 HAA Btys
  - 419 HAA Bty joined July 1941
- 59th (Essex Regiment) HAA Rgt from 37 AA Bde in 6 AA Division Autumn 1941, to 8 AA Division December 1941
  - 164, 167, 265, 418 HAA Btys
- 60th (City of London) HAA Rgt joined by October, left to become unbrigaded mobile unit by November 1942
  - 168, 169, 206 HAA Btys
- 72nd (Hampshire) HAA Rgt joined January 1942; to WO control by May 1942, returned by October, then to Operation Torch December 1942
  - 217, 218, 393 HAA Btys
- 76th (Gloucestershire) HAA Rgt joined June, left July 1942, later in Operation Torch
  - 236, 237, 349 HAA Btys
- 85th (Tees) HAA Rgt joined Autumn 1941; left June 1942, later in Operation Torch
  - 174, 175, 220, 413 HAA Btys
- 90 HAA Rgt unbrigaded July 1942, then to 71 AA Bde in 6 AA Division September 1942
  - 272, 384, 285, 394 HAA Btys
- 127th HAA Rgt new unit formed August 1941, joined Autumn 1941, to 71 Bde June 1942, returned by October 1942; left May 1943
  - 162 HAA Bty to WO control April 1942, then to East Africa Command
  - 396, 411, 433 HAA Btys
  - 422 HAA Bty from 75 HAA Rgt, 37 AA Bde, April 1942
- 128th HAA Rgt joined by November 1942; left April 1943
  - 287, 407 HAA Btys
  - 309 HAA Bty attached to 5 AA Bde in 6 AA Division
  - 436 HAA Bty attached to 5 AA Group
- 148th (Mixed) HAA Rgt joined April 1943
  - 624, 628, 629 (M) HAA Btys
  - 631, 633 (M) HAA Btys joined October 1943
- 159th (Mixed) HAA Rgt new unit formed May 1942, joined by October 1942; left October 1943
  - 542, 543 (M) HAA Btys
- 169th (Mixed) HAA Rgt joined October 1943
  - 566, 571, 576, 578 (M) HAA Btys
- 4th (Ulster) Light Anti-Aircraft Regiment Supplementary Reserve regiment formed from 3rd (Ulster) Searchlight Regiment, which had served in France with the British Expeditionary Force and had been evacuated (without equipment) from Dunkirk; to 56 AA Bde by May 1942
- 16th LAA Rgt from 56 LAA Bde Spring 1941, to WO Reserve July 1941; later to Middle East Command
  - 45, 46, 83 LAA Btys
- 43rd LAA Rgt joined July, left December 1941, later to Ceylon
  - 147, 148, 198 LAA Btys
- 49th LAA Rgt from 6 AA Bde in 6 AA Division June 1942; to 78th Infantry Division July 1942
  - 84, 90, 280, 298 LAA Btys
- 69th LAA Rgt new unit formed December 1940, joined Spring 1941, to 56 AA Bde January 1942
  - 199, 206, 207 LAA Btys
- 129th (1st Surrey Rifles) LAA Rgt joined June 1942, to 71 AA Bde September 1942
  - 425, 426, 427, 455 LAA Btys
- 132nd LAA Rgt from 71 AA Bde July 1942
  - 436 HAA Bty Attached to 38 AA Bde
  - 437, 438, 439 LAA Btys
- 143rd LAA Rgt new unit formed October 1942; left by March 1943
  - 403, 410, 413, 484 LAA Btys
- 12th (Mixed) AA 'Z' Rgt Z Battery AA rocket unit joined from 56 AA Bde January 1942; left November 1943
  - 111, 126 Z Btys left by November 1942
  - 124 Z Bty attached to 71 AA Bde; left January 1943
  - 178 Z Bty
  - 196, 211 Z Btys joined by December 1942; attached to 37 AA Bde
  - 232 Z Bty joined January 1943

After this rapid turnover, the brigade only had three units under command by the end of 1943:

- 148th (M) HAA Rgt
  - 624, 629, 631, 633 (M) HAA Btys
- 169th (M) HAA Rgt
  - 566, 571, 576, 578 (M) HAA Btys
- 132nd LAA Rgt
  - 436, 437, 438 LAA Btys

By March 1944 AA Command was releasing manpower for the planned Allied invasion of continental Europe and 90th HAA and 4th LAA Regiments joined Second Army to prepare for the Normandy Landings (Operation Overlord). Although many regiments were reduced by one or more batteries, there were few other changes to the brigade's order of battle in the early part of 1944:

- 97th LAA Rgt: joined May 1944, left July 1944.
  - 232, 301, 480 LAA Btys
- 144th LAA Rgt: joined by October 1944.
  - 414, 431 LAA Btys

By October 1944, the brigade's HQ establishment was 9 officers, 8 male other ranks and 24, female, members of the Auxiliary Territorial Service (ATS), together with a small number of attached drivers, cooks and mess orderlies (male and female). In addition the brigade had a Mixed signal office section of 1 officer, 5 male other ranks and 19 ATS, which was formally part of the Group signal unit.

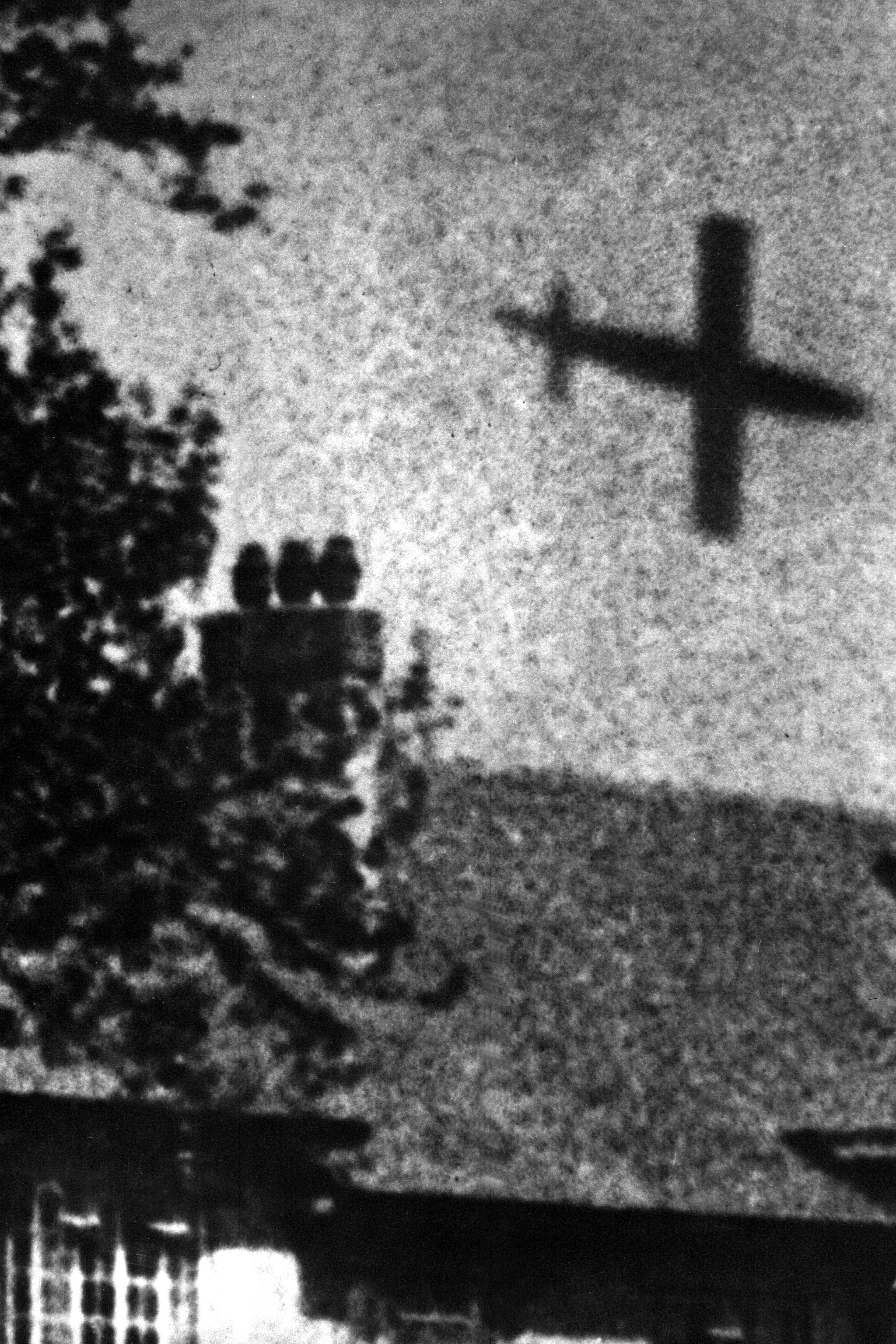
V-1 falling over London, 1944.

== Operation Diver ==
The Luftwaffe began a new bombing campaign against London in early 1944 (the Baby Blitz). By now the night fighter defences, the London Inner Artillery Zone and Thames Estuary defences were well organised and the attackers suffered heavy losses for relatively small results. More significant were the V-1 flying bombs, codenamed "Divers", which began to be launched against London from northern France soon after D-Day. These presented AA Command's biggest challenge since the Blitz. Defences had been planned against this new form of attack (Operation Diver), but it presented a severe problem for AA guns. Anti-aircraft gunners found that such small fast-moving targets were very difficult to hit. The cruising altitude of the V-1, between 600 and 900 m (2,000 and 3,000 ft), was just above the effective range of light anti-aircraft guns, and just below the optimum engagement height of heavier guns. The altitude and speed were more than the rate of traverse of the standard British QF 3.7-inch mobile gun could cope with. The static version of the QF 3.7-inch, designed for use on a permanent, concrete platform, had a faster traverse. The cost and delay of installing new permanent platforms for the guns was avoided by the use of temporary platforms devised by the REME and made from railway sleepers and rails. This was found to be adequate for the static guns, making them considerably easier to re-deploy as the V-1 threat changed. They were known as 'Pile Platforms' after General Pile. After two weeks' experience of the V1 threat AA Command carried out a major reorganisation, stripping guns from the London IAZ and other parts of the UK and repositioning them along the south coast. In total 600 guns, 23,000 crew and support personnel and over 30,000 tons of ammunition were moved to the south coast in three days. Here they targeted V-1s coming in over the English Channel, where a downed V-1 would cause no damage.

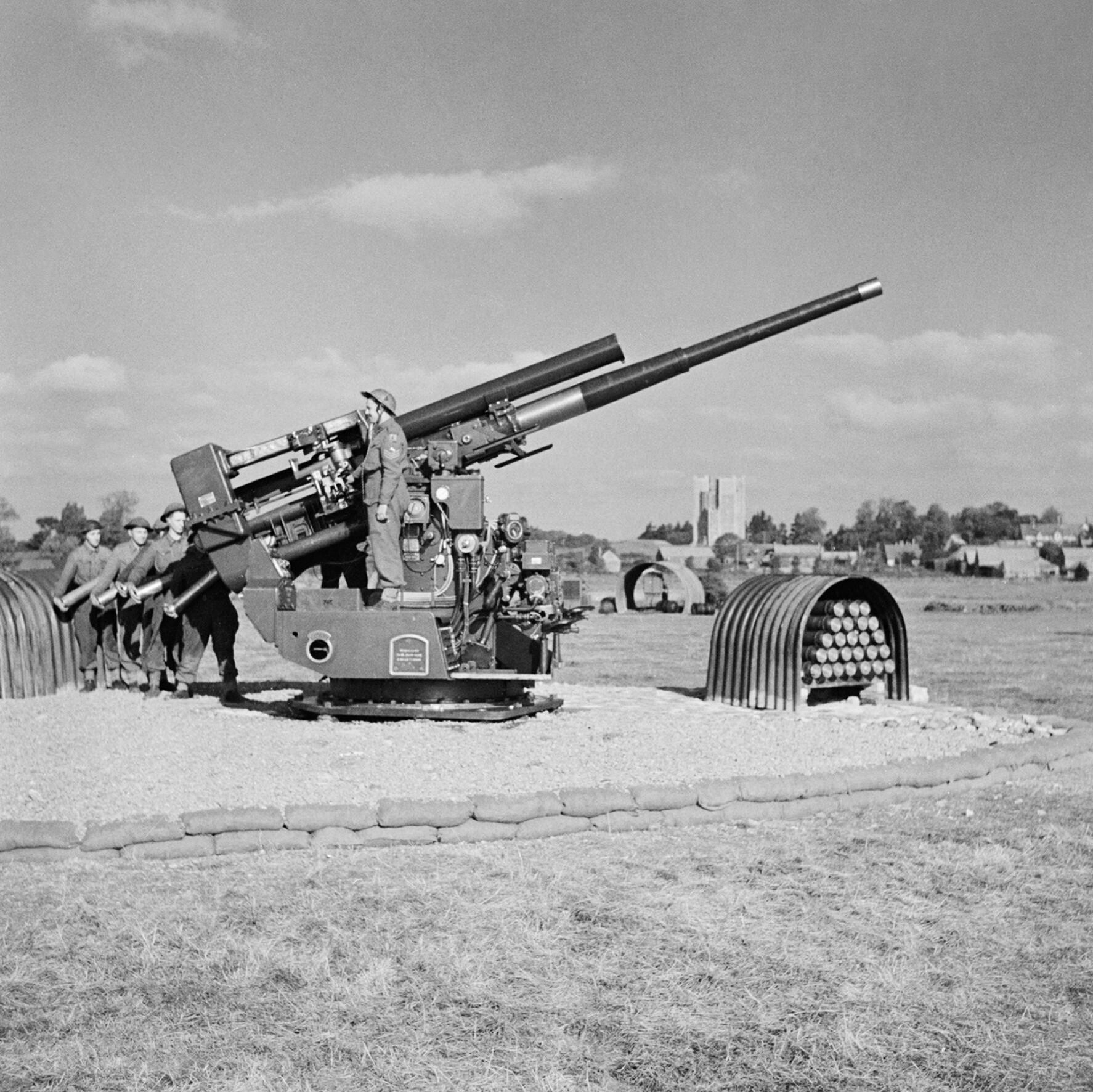
Static 3.7-inch gun of 127th HAA Rgt on a 'Pile Platform' at Southwold, Suffolk, 9 October 1944.

As the launching sites were overrun by 21st Army Group, the Luftwaffe switched to air-launching V-1s over the North Sea, resulting in another redeployment for 1 AA Group, this time to the east of London. New HAA sites had to be quickly established, with new Pile Platforms' being built and thousands of huts moved and re-erected to shelter the crews as winter approached. During this phase of Operation Diver there were over 2,600 light and heavy AA guns along the coast of East Anglia between Newhaven and Deal, the "Diver Belt", and 850 to the east of London in the "Diver Box". 28 AA Bde was part of the latter group. The Germans responded by launching V1s from further to the north, in order to bypass the Diver defences. AA Command hurriedly set up the "Diver Strip" between Clacton and Great Yarmouth, and formed a new 9 AA Group to take over the Diver defences in East Anglia. 28 AA Bde moved to this new formation in December 1944, giving up its previous units and taking over fresh ones. The establishment of the Diver Strip included the establishment of permanent sites for 64 heavy guns, using Pile Platforms, constructing 60 miles of new roads to take heavy traffic and set up 3,500 Nissen huts. These necessitated the use of 150,000 tons of hard core, 500,000 concrete blocks and 20,000 panes of glass, among much other material. The setting up of the Diver Strip did not run as smoothly as earlier redeployments. General Pile reported move as "chaotic" and "deplorable and the attitude of staff as having "a general lassitude" and being "panicky". Nevertheless, the East Anglian defences as a whole were successful, less than 6% of air-launched V1s hit London. During the entire V1 campaign 10,492 V1s were targeted at London; 4,000 were destroyed by the various Diver defences, anti-aircraft guns, fighters and balloons, and 2,400 landed within greater London.

At this time, its order of battle was:

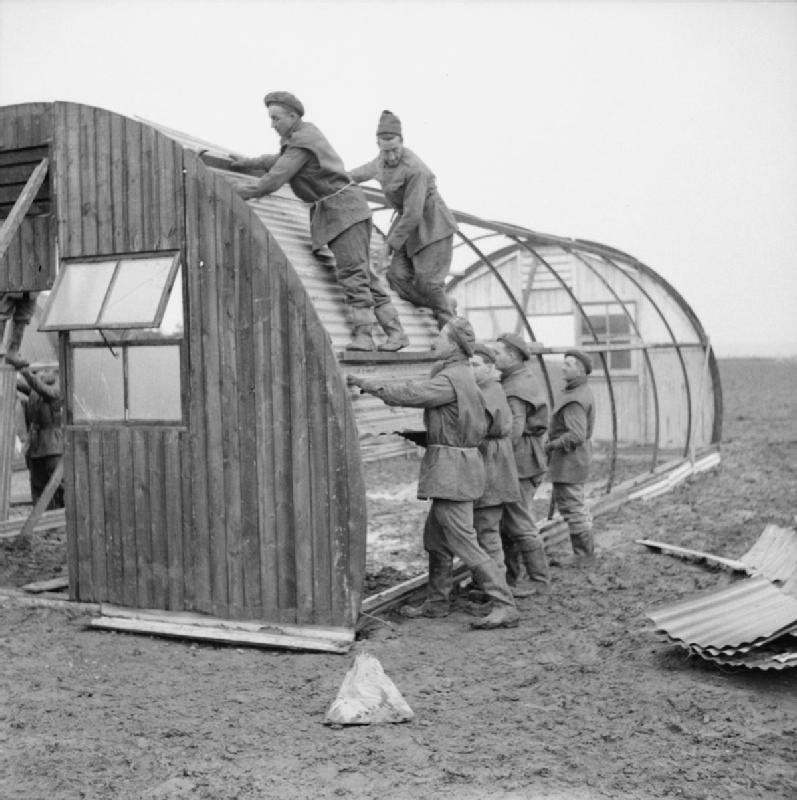
A Nissen hut being erected at an AA site, November 1944.

- 129th (M) HAA Rgt
  - 444, 445, 454 (M) HAA Btys
- 138th HAA Rgt joined March–April 1945
  - 419, 424, 437 HAA Btys
- 141st (M) HAA Rgt
  - 486, 490, 493 (M) HAA Btys
- 131st LAA Rgt left by February 1945
  - 432, 433, 434 LAA Btys

== Postwar ==
9 AA Group was disbanded after VE Day and 28 AA Bde returned to 1 AA Group with 129th and 141st (Mixed) HAA Rgts. With the end of the war in Europe, AA units and formations began to be demobilised, but 28 AA Bde was joined by 130th (Queen's Edinburgh Royal Scots) LAA Rgt (406, 407, 428 LAA Btys) from October 1945 until its disbandment in March 1946. 129th and 141st HAA Regiments were formally disbanded on 1 January 1947.

When the TA was reconstituted on 1 January 1947, the Thames and Medway AA Brigade's Regular Army units reformed 7 AA Bde while the TA portion was renumbered as 54 (Thames & Medway) AA Brigade. (Note: The TA AA brigades were now numbered 51 and upwards, rather than 26 and upwards as in the 1930s; the wartime 54 AA Bde was renumbered 80.) Once again, it had the two Kent HAA regiments under its command, now renumbered 455 and 458 rather than 55 and 58. It also had 564 Searchlight Regiment, the prewar 29 (Kent) Searchlight Regiment. It was based at Gillingham, Kent, and was subordinate to 1 AA Group. (Note: AA Command's corps and divisions had been disbanded in 1942 and a group structure introduced; 1 AA Group controlled the air defences of the London region.) However, 54 AA Bde was disbanded the following year, completely disappearing in September 1948.
