= 73rd (Kent Fortress) Searchlight Regiment, Royal Artillery =

73rd (Kent Fortress) Searchlight Regiment 608 Heavy Anti-Aircraft Regiment
- Active: 1 April 1939–10 March 1955
- Country: United Kingdom
- Branch: Territorial Army
- Type: Searchlight Regiment
- Role: Air Defence
- Size: 3–4 Batteries
- Part of: 6 AA Division; 2 AA Group; 67 AA Bde
- Garrison/HQ: Bexleyheath
- Engagements: Battle of Britain; The Blitz; Operation Diver

The 73rd (Kent Fortress) Searchlight Regiment was a volunteer air defence unit of Britain's Territorial Army (TA) from 1939 until 1955, at first as part of the Royal Engineers, later in the Royal Artillery. It served during the Battle of Britain and The Blitz.

== Origin ==
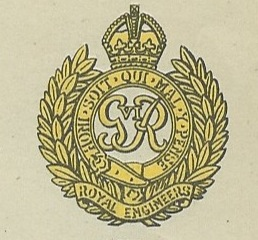
Cap badge of the Royal Engineers

The unit was formed as 73rd (Kent Fortress) AA Battalion, RE, on 1 April 1939 as part of the expansion of TA Anti-Aircraft (AA) defences under Anti-Aircraft Command before the outbreak of World War II. It was created by combining three existing AA Searchlight Companies of the Royal Engineers (RE): 322 and 347 AA Companies from the 29th (Kent) AA Battalion, and 331 AA Company from the 32nd (7th City of London) AA Battalion. It appears that 347 (Kent) Company was drawn from personnel of the three Electric Light and Works companies of the Kent Fortress Royal Engineers based at Northfleet, which gave its title to the new battalion:

73rd (Kent Fortress) Anti-Aircraft Battalion, Royal Engineers

- HQ at Watling Street, Bexleyheath
- 322 AA Company at Drill Hall, Horns Cross, Greenhithe
- 331 AA Company at Bexleyheath
- 347 (Kent) AA Company at Lamorbey House, Halfway Street, Sidcup

== World War II ==
=== Mobilisation ===
90 cm Projector Anti-Aircraft, displayed at Fort Nelson, Portsmouth

The TA's AA units were mobilised on 23 September 1938 during the Munich Crisis, with units manning their emergency positions within 24 hours, even though many did not yet have their full complement of men or equipment. The emergency lasted three weeks, and they were stood down on 13 October. In February 1939 the existing AA defences came under the control of a new Anti-Aircraft Command. In June, a partial mobilisation of TA units was begun in a process known as 'couverture', whereby each AA unit did a month's tour of duty in rotation to man selected AA and searchlight positions. On 24 August, ahead of the declaration of war, AA Command was fully mobilised at its war stations.

- 322 AA Company: Horns Cross; mobilisation store at Kidbrooke
- 331 AA Company: Crown Inn, Laindon, Essex; mobilisation store at Warley, Essex
- 347 AA Company: Windmill Hotel, Kingshill, Kent; mobilisation store at Wainscott, Kent

The battalion formed part of 29th (East Anglian) Anti-Aircraft Brigade in 6th Anti-Aircraft Division, responsible for the air defence of the Thames Estuary and the adjacent Kent and Essex shores.

=== Phoney War ===
In the spring of 1940, 6 AA Division reorganised its growing AA defences. As a result, 73rd AA Bn and its S/L sites were transferred from 29th AA Bde to 56th Light AA Bde. This formation controlled the S/L sites and Light AA (LAA) guns in Kent, supporting the Heavy AA guns of the Thames South zone running from Dartford to Chatham and the RAF's Night fighters.

=== Battle of Britain ===
Cap Badge of the Royal Artillery.

The Phoney War ended with the German invasion of France and the Low Countries on 10 May 1940. Home Forces became concerned about the threat from German paratroopers and AA Command's units were given anti-invasion roles. A plan to attach groups of riflemen from the infantry training centres to 6 AA Division's widely-spaced S/L sites foundered on the lack of men. Instead, the S/L detachments themselves were given the responsibility for attacking parachutists before they could organise, and spare men at company HQs were formed into mobile columns using requisitioned civilian transport to hunt them down. 73rd AA Battalion drew extra rifles and ammunition from Wainscott Ordnance Store.

On 1 August 1940, the battalion, along with all other RE searchlight units, was transferred to the Royal Artillery (RA), becoming 73rd (Kent Fortress) Searchlight Regiment, and its AA companies were termed searchlight (S/L) batteries.

=== The Blitz ===
Formation sign of 6 Anti-Aircraft Division, worn until September 1942.

The S/L layouts had been based on a spacing of 3500 yards, but due to equipment shortages this had been extended to 6000 yards by the time the Luftwaffe began its night Blitz in September 1940. In November, this was changed to clusters of three lights to improve illumination, but this meant that the clusters had to be spaced 10,400 yards apart. The cluster system was an attempt to improve the chances of picking up enemy bombers and keeping them illuminated for engagement by AA guns or Royal Air Force (RAF) Night fighters. Eventually, one light in each cluster was to be equipped with searchlight control (SLC) radar and act as 'master light', but the radar equipment was still in short supply. 73rd S/L Regiment served throughout the Blitz.

The regiment supplied a cadre of experienced officers and men to 236th S/L Training Rgt at Oswestry where it provided the basis for a new 533 S/L Bty formed on 14 November 1940. This battery later joined 87th S/L Rgt.

=== Mid-War ===
By October 1941, the availability of SLC radar was sufficient to allow AA Command's S/Ls to be 'declustered' into single-light sites spaced at 10,400-yard intervals in 'Indicator Belts' along the coast and 'Killer Belts' at 6000-yard spacing inland to cooperate with night fighters. On 23 January 1942, the regiment was joined by 508 S/L Bty from 29th (Kent) S/L Rgt, when the rest of that regiment moved from 56th LAA Bde to South West England. There was another shake-up of AA Command at the beginning of October 1942, when the AA Divisions were replaced by AA Groups having a wider remit. 56th LAA Brigade and 73rd S/L Rgt were now in 2 AA Group, but 73rd S/L Regiment remained in Kent with 56th LAA Bde throughout the year.

In February 1943, 73rd (Kent Fortress) S/L Rgt was transferred from 56th AA Bde to reinforce 27th AA Bde on the South Coast. 27th AA Brigade was dealing with 'hit-and-run' attacks by Luftwaffe fighter-bombers attacking coastal towns at low level in daylight, and the defensive armament of S/L positions was increased, with the existing Lewis guns being supplemented with twin Vickers K machine gun mountings and later twin 0.5-inch Browning machine guns on power mountings. On 10 April, 73rd S/L Rgt was replaced in this duty by 33rd (St Pancras) S/L Rgt and returned to 56th AA Bde.

By mid-1943, AA Command was being forced to release manpower for overseas service, particularly Operation Overlord (the planned Allied invasion of Normandy) and most S/L regiments lost one of their four batteries; 347 S/L Bty was disbanded on 5 July 1943.

=== Operation Diver ===
Soon after D Day, the Germans began launching V-1 flying bombs against London by day and night. The AA resources in SE England were strongly reinforced in Operation Diver, but the LAA batteries found these small, fast-moving targets hard to engage. Searchlight units used their SLC radar to help guide the LAA guns. A lull in the V-1 attacks saw renewed pressure on AA Command to release men for 21st Army Group fighting in North West Europe, and 73rd (Kent Fortress) S/L Rgt was among the regiments that were lost, passing into suspended animation at Braunton in North Devon on 23 September 1944 and completing the process by 3 March 1945.

== Postwar ==
When the TA was reconstituted on 1 January 1947, the regiment was reformed in the heavy anti-aircraft artillery role as 608th (Kent) (Mixed) Heavy Anti-Aircraft Regiment, RA ('Mixed' indicating that members of the Women's Royal Army Corps were integrated into the unit). The regiment was in 67 AA Bde.

Anti-Aircraft Command was disbanded in 1955, and there was a major reduction in TA air defence units. 608 HAA Regiment was amalgamated with 458 (Kent) (Mixed) HAA Regiment and 564 (Kent) (Mixed) Light Anti-Aircraft/Searchlight Regiment (the former 29th AA Bn RE). The new regiment became 458 (Kent) Light Anti-Aircraft Regiment, with 608 HAA Rgt providing RHQ and S Battery.

== External sources ==
- British Army units from 1945 on
- British Military History
- Orders of Battle at Patriot Files
- The Royal Artillery 1939–45
- Graham Watson, The Territorial Army 1947.
