= 29th (Kent) Searchlight Regiment, Royal Artillery =

Volunteer air defence unit of Britain's Territorial Army

29th (Kent) Anti-Aircraft Battalion, RE 29th (Kent) Searchlight Regiment, RA 631st (Kent) Infantry Regiment, RA 564 (Kent) Searchlight Regiment, RA
- Active: 1935–1955
- Country: United Kingdom
- Branch: Territorial Army
- Type: Searchlight Regiment
- Role: Air Defence
- Size: 2–4 Batteries
- Part of: Chatham; Gillingham
- Engagements: The Blitz; North West Europe

The 29th (Kent) Searchlight Regiment was a volunteer air defence unit of Britain's Territorial Army (TA) from 1935 until 1955, at first as part of the Royal Engineers (RE), later in the Royal Artillery (RA). It served during The Blitz, defended South West England, Orkney and Shetland before becoming garrison troops in North West Europe.

The unit was a searchlight (S/L) battalion originating in the home counties around London. It was fully mobilised shortly before the outbreak of World War II. From May 1940, it started to be equipped with the then very advanced searchlight control radar. After the German conquest of France, the battalion was additionally tasked with attacking any paratroopers landing within the unit's area.

From 1943, personnel were being released from the unit to serve in other parts of the army; in August, one of the regiment's four batteries was detached. The whole of 29th Searchlight Regiment was converted into infantry and redesignated 631st (Kent) Infantry Regiment RA in January 1945, serving in North West Europe from April 1945.

In January 1947, the regiment was reconstituted as 564 Searchlight Regiment, RA (Kent) and successor units still occupy the old regiment's bases.

== Origin ==
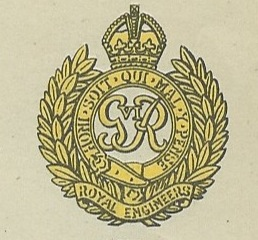
Cap badge of the Royal Engineers (cipher of King George VI).

The regiment had its origins in a group of Independent Air Defence Companies of the Royal Engineers formed in the Home counties by the Territorial Army during 1924. The headquarters (HQ) was formed in January 1925.

Kent & Middlesex Group Anti-Aircraft Searchlight Companies:

- HQ at Marine School, Chatham
- 313 (Kent) AA Company at Marine School, Chatham
- 314 (Kent) AA Company at Southborough, later Tonbridge
- 317 (Middlesex) AA Company at Hendon

The Commanding Officer (CO) of the Kent & Middlesex Group (and later the 29th (Kent) Battalion) from 1 November 1929 was Colonel R.C. Milliken.

In October 1935, the Kent Group became 29th Anti-Aircraft Battalion, Royal Engineers (TA), while 317 Company was separated to form the 36th (Middlesex) Anti-Aircraft Battalion, Royal Engineers (TA). Two further companies were added to the 29th Bn:

- 322nd AA Company at Horns Cross, Greenhithe
- 347th (Kent) AA Company at Sidcup

In December 1935, the battalion was subordinated to the newly formed 28th (Thames & Medway) Anti-Aircraft Group (later termed a brigade (Bde)), also based at Chatham, and forming part of 1st Anti-Aircraft Division. It transferred to 27 (Home Counties) AA Gp in 1 AA Division the following year In the years before World War II, British anti-aircraft (AA) defences continued to expand, with new regiments and formations, the whole coming under Anti-Aircraft Command. In April 1939, the 322nd and 347th Companies were transferred to help form the new 73rd (Kent Fortress) Bn RE, and were replaced by a newly raised 468th Company at Dover.

The battalion's organisation on the eve of World War II was as follows:

- Battalion HQ: Watling Street, Gillingham
  - CO: Lt-Col C.A, Grover, AMInstCE (appointed 1 November 1937)
- 313 (Kent) AA Company: Watling Street, Gillingham
- 314 (Kent) AA Company: Avebury Avenue, Tonbridge
- 468 AA Company: Archcliffe Fort, Dover

The 1st/313th (Kent) AA Cadet Company, RE, was affiliated to 313 (Kent) AA Company.

== World War II ==
=== Mobilisation ===
90 cm 'Projector Anti-Aircraft', displayed at Fort Nelson, Portsmouth.

The TA's AA units were mobilised on 23 September 1938, during the Munich Crisis, with units manning their emergency positions within 24 hours, even though many did not yet have their full complement of men or equipment. The emergency lasted three weeks, and they were stood down on 13 October. In June 1939, as the international situation worsened, a partial mobilisation of the TA was begun in a process known as 'couverture', whereby each AA unit did a month's tour of duty in rotation to man selected AA gun and searchlight positions. On 24 August, ahead of the declaration of war, AA Command was fully mobilised at its war stations.

29th AA Battalion's company HQs were distributed as follows:

- 313: Gillingham, mobilisation stores at Sheerness and Wainscott
- 314: Cricketer's Arms, Molash, mobilisation store at Sittingbourne
- 468: Red Lion, Wingham, mobilisation store at Lydden

=== Phoney War ===
Lieutenant-Colonel Grover relinquished command on 8 March 1940 and was replaced by Lieutenant-Colonel S.J. Marks who was promoted from commanding a battery in 28th (Essex) AA Bn.

By the outbreak of war, 29th AA Battalion had come under the command of 29th (East Anglian) AA Bde in 6th AA Division. In the spring of 1940, 6 AA Division reorganised its growing AA defences. As a result, 29th AA Bn and its S/L sites in Kent were transferred from 29 AA Bde to 27 (Home Counties) AA Bde. In May, the first, very secret, searchlight control radar sets (SLC) began to appear, with one being stationed at a site of 468 S/L Bty operating behind Dover so that the light could pick up aircraft coming in over the Kent coast. Also, in early May, 342 AA Coy from 35th (1st Surrey Rifles) AA Bn came under the operational control of 29th AA Bn to thicken up the searchlight (S/L) distribution between Dover and RAF Hornchurch.

=== Invasion fears ===
RA cap badge.

The Phoney War ended with the German invasion of France and the Low Countries on 10 May 1940. Home Forces became concerned about the threat from German paratroopers and AA Command's units were given anti-invasion roles. A plan to attach groups of riflemen from the infantry training centres to 6 AA Division's widely spaced S/L sites foundered on the lack of men. Instead, the S/L detachments themselves were given the responsibility for attacking parachutists before they could organise, and spare men at company HQs were formed into mobile columns using requisitioned civilian transport to hunt them down. 29th AA Battalion drew extra rifles and ammunition from Wainscott Ordnance Store.

In common with other RE searchlight battalions, the unit was transferred to the Royal Artillery in August 1940, becoming 29th (Kent) Searchlight Regiment RA (TA), and the companies were termed batteries.

=== The Blitz ===
6 AA Division formation badge worn 1941.

During the summer of 1940, 27 AA Bde HQ moved to 5 AA Division to cover Portsmouth while 6 AA Division concentrated its S/L and Light AA (LAA) gun units in Kent into 56 Light AA Bde. This was soon followed by the night-bombing campaign of The Blitz, in which searchlights were a key element in the defences. The S/L layouts had been based on a spacing of 3500 yards, but due to equipment shortages this had been extended to 6000 yards by September 1940. In November, this was changed to clusters of three lights to improve illumination, but this meant that the clusters had to be spaced 10,400 yards apart. The cluster system was an attempt to improve the chances of picking up enemy bombers and keeping them illuminated for engagement by AA guns or Night fighters. Eventually, one light in each cluster was to be equipped with SLC radar and act as 'master light', but the radar equipment was still in short supply.

A new 508 S/L Bty was formed in September 1940 and joined the regiment on 12 November. The regiment then supplied a cadre of experienced officers and men to 233rd S/L Training Rgt at Saighton Camp, where it provided the basis for a new 548 S/L Bty formed on 16 January 1941. This battery later joined the newly forming 90th S/L Rgt. By the end of the Blitz, in May 1941, 29th S/L Rgt was still in 56 LAA Bde; 342 S/L Bty had returned to 35th S/L Rgt.

=== Mid-War ===
By October 1941, the availability of SLC radar was sufficient to allow AA Command's S/Ls to be 'declustered' into single-light sites spaced at 10,400-yard intervals in 'Indicator Belts' along the coast and 'Killer Belts' at 6,000-yard spacing inland to co-operate with the RAF's night fighters.

8 AA Division formation badge worn 1942.

At New Year 1942, the regiment moved to 55 Light AA Bde in 8 AA Division, covering Plymouth and Falmouth in South West England, but 508 S/L Bty transferred to 73rd (Kent Fortress) S/L Rgt on 23 January and remained in South East England. In March 1942, 313 S/L Bty was temporarily attached to 69 AA Bde in 8 AA Division.

In June 1942, the regiment was switched to 60 AA Bde in 8 AA Division, covering Exeter, Yeovil and Portland. The main threat along the South Coast of England during 1942 was from low level daylight 'hit and run' raids by single engined Luftwaffe aircraft, which were difficult for HAA guns to engage but provided targets of opportunity for LAA guns and the Light machine guns with which S/L sites were equipped.

There was another shake-up of AA Command at the beginning of October 1942, when the AA Divisions were replaced by AA Groups having a wider remit. 60 AA Brigade and 29th S/L Rgt were now in 3 AA Group covering South West England. On 20 December 1942, the regiment was joined by 511 Independent S/L Bty (previously with 30th (Surrey) S/L Rgt), which was attached to 63 AA Bde in 5 AA Group (East Midlands and Yorkshire) in April and May, as was 313 S/L Bty in May.

By 1943, AA Command was being forced to release manpower for overseas service, particularly Operation Overlord (the planned Allied invasion of Normandy) and most S/L regiments lost one of their four batteries; 511 S/L Bty disbanded on 17 June 1943.

The regiment left 3 AA Group in October 1943 and joined 58 AA Bde in the Orkney and Shetland Defences (OSDEF). It remained there for over a year, but on 10 May 1944, 314 S/L Bty was detached and became an independent unit.

In late 1944–early 1945, 314 (Independent) S/L Bty was in East Anglia, operating a line of radar-controlled searchlights from Clacton to Lowestoft engaging 'Divers' (the code name for V-1 flying bombs).

=== 631st (Kent) Infantry Regiment, RA ===
By the end of 1944, the German Luftwaffe was suffering from such shortages of pilots, aircraft and fuel that serious aerial attacks on the United Kingdom could be discounted. At the same time, 21st Army Group fighting in North West Europe was suffering a severe manpower shortage, particularly among the infantry. In January 1945, the War Office began to reorganise surplus anti-aircraft and coastal artillery regiments in the UK into infantry battalions, primarily for line of communication and occupation duties, thereby releasing trained infantry for frontline service. 29th Searchlight Regiment was one of the units selected for conversion, and was brought down from OSDEF along with 59 AA Bde HQ. On 22 January 1945, the regiment was redesignated 631st (Kent) Infantry Regiment RA, attached to 307th Infantry Brigade (converted from 59 AA Bde).

After infantry training, 631 Regiment was sent to North West Europe in April 1945 to work under 21st Army Group and HQ SHAEF.

== Postwar ==
631 Regiment was placed in suspended animation on 4 February 1946. When the TA was reconstituted on 1 January 1947, the regiment was reformed as 564 Searchlight Regiment, RA (Kent). Its HQ was at Gillingham, and once again it formed part of the Thames & Medway AA Bde, now renumbered 54 AA Bde. Two years later, the regiment's role was partly changed and it was redesignated 564th (Mixed) Light Anti-Aircraft/Searchlight Regiment, "Mixed" indicating that some of the personnel were from the Women's Royal Army Corps.

When AA Command was disbanded in 1955, the regiment was amalgamated with a number of other Kent AA units to form 458th (Kent) Light Anti-Aircraft Regiment, becoming 'Q' and 'R Batteries' in the merged regiment. In 1961, a further amalgamation saw 458 Regiment becoming P (Kent) Battery in 265 Light Anti-Aircraft Regiment and its successor, the London and Kent Regiment. This remaining battery was disbanded in 1969.

Successor units still occupy Grove Park and Bexleyheath drill-halls, as 265 (Home Counties) Battery, 106th (Yeomanry) Regiment Royal Artillery and 265 (Kent and County of London Yeomanry) Support Squadron, Royal Corps of Signals. Both units strive to continue and maintain the traditions and history of their predecessor Regiments.

Regimental silver is displayed within The Army Reserve Centre, Baring Road, Grove Park, London SE12 0BH. These can be viewed at by prior appointment.

== Honorary Colonel ==
The following served as Honorary Colonel of the regiment:

- John (later Sir John) Perring (1870–1948), a businessman and prominent member of the London County Council and Middlesex Territorial Association, was appointed Honorary Colonel of the Kent & Middlesex Group in 1931 and remained Hon Col of 36th (Middlesex) AA Bn after the split.
- Brigadier R.C. Milliken, OBE, TD, MIEE, former Commanding Officer, appointed 1 November 1937.

== External sources ==
- British Army units from 1945 on
- British Military History
- Orders of Battle at Patriot Files
- Land Forces of Britain, the Empire and Commonwealth (Regiments.org)
- The Royal Artillery 1939–45
- Graham Watson, The Territorial Army 1947
