= 6th Anti-Aircraft Division =

- Formation sign of the 6th Anti-Aircraft division.
- Active: 21 August 1939–30 September 1942
- Country: United Kingdom
- Branch: Territorial Army
- Type: Anti-Aircraft Division
- Role: Air Defence
- Part of: Anti-Aircraft Command (1939–40); I AA Corps (1940–42)
- Garrison/HQ: Uxbridge, later Chelmsford
- Engagements: Battle of Britain; The Blitz

The 6th Anti-Aircraft Division (6th AA Division) was an air defence formation created within Anti-Aircraft Command of Britain's Territorial Army just before the Second World War. It defended the Thames Estuary and the approaches to London during the Battle of Britain and the Blitz.

== Origin ==
The 6th AA Division was formed during 1939 to take responsibility for the air defence of the Thames Estuary, Essex and North Kent, with its HQ at Uxbridge, Middlesex. The existing 27th (Home Counties), 28th (Thames & Medway), 29th (East Anglian) and 37th AA Brigades were transferred to this new formation, together with the new formations and units of the Royal Artillery (RA) and Royal Engineers (RE) being raised as part of the expansion of the TA after the Munich Crisis.

The divisional HQ was provided by duplicating the 1st AA Division's headquarter elements at RAF Uxbridge, including 1st AA Divisional Signals. Major-General Frederick Hyland was promoted from command of the 31st (North Midland) Anti-Aircraft Brigade to General Officer Commanding of the new division on 30 May 1939. He continued in command throughout its existence.

The divisional badge was a red arrow piercing a black and white target on a black square.

== Mobilisation ==
=== Order of Battle ===
The division's composition on the outbreak of war in 1939 was as follows:

27th (Home Counties) AA Brigade at Lingfield, Surrey

- 31st (City of London Rifles) AA Bn, RE – searchlight unit converted from infantry in 1935
  - HQ, 324th, 325th, 326th, 327th AA Companies
- 34th (The Queen's Own Royal West Kent) AA Bn RE – searchlight unit converted from infantry in 1935
  - HQ, 302nd, 336th, 337th, 338th AA Companies
- 70th (Sussex) Searchlight Regiment, Royal Artillery – new unit raised in 1938
- 27th AA Brigade Company Royal Army Service Corps (RASC)

28th (Thames & Medway) AA Brigade at Kitchener Barracks, Chatham, Kent

- 55th (Kent) AA Regiment, RA
  - HQ, 163rd (Kent), 166th (City of Rochester), 30th7 and 308th AA Batteries – heavy anti-aircraft (HAA) unit formed in 1925
- 58th (Kent) AA Regiment, RA – HAA unit converted from medium artillery in 1935
  - HQ, 206th (Erith), 207th (Erith), 208th (Bromley) and 264th (Dartford) AA Batteries
- 75th (Home Counties) (Cinque Ports) AA Regiment, RA – HAA unit converted from field artillery in 1938
  - HQ, 223rd (Cinque Ports), 233rd (Kent) and 306th AA Batteries
- 89th (Cinque Ports) AA Regiment, RA – new HAA unit raised as duplicate of 75th AA Rgt in 1939
  - HQ, 205th (Kent), 234th (Kent) and 235th (Kent) AA Batteries
- 28th AA Brigade Company RASC

29th (East Anglian) AA Brigade at South Kensington, London– came under operational command 7 September 1939

- 28th (Essex) AA Bn, RE – searchlight unit formed in 1935
  - HQ, 309th (Essex), 311th (Essex) and 312th (Essex) AA Companies
- 29th (Kent) AA Bn, RE – searchlight unit formed in 1935
  - HQ, 313th (Kent), 314th (Kent) and 468th AA Companies
- 73rd (Kent Fortress) AA Bn, RE – searchlight unit partly converted from fortress engineers in 1939
  - HQ, 322nd, 331st and 347th (Kent) AA Companies
- 74th (Essex Fortress) AA Bn, RE – searchlight unit partly converted from fortress engineers in 1939
  - HQ, 310th (Essex), 335th and 469th AA Companies
- 29th AA Brigade Company RASC

37th AA Brigade at Edmonton, London

- 59th (The Essex Regiment) AA Regiment, RA – HAA unit converted from infantry in 1935
  - HQ, 164th, 167th and 265th AA Batteries
- 61st (Middlesex) AA Regiment, RA – HAA unit converted from infantry in 1935
  - HQ, 170th, 171st and 195th AA Batteries
- 79th (Hertfordshire Yeomanry) AA Regiment, RA – HAA unit converted from field artillery in 1938
  - HQ, 246th (1st Watford), 247th (2nd Watford) and 248th (Welwyn) AA Batteries
- 82nd (Essex) AA Regiment, RA – new HAA unit raised in 1937
  - HQ, 156th (Barking), 193rd and 256th (Barking) AA Batteries
- 90th AA Regiment, RA – new HAA unit raised in 1939
  - HQ, 272nd, 284th and 285th AA Batteries
- 37th AA Brigade Company RASC

56th Light AA Brigade at Uxbridge

- 11th (City of London Yeomanry) LAA Regiment, RA – light AA (LAA) unit converted from horse artillery in 1939
  - HQ, 31st, 32nd, 33rd and 43rd LAA Batteries
- 12th (Finsbury Rifles) LAA Regiment, RA – LAA unit converted from HAA in 1939
  - HQ, 34th, 35th, 36th and 44th LAA Batteries
- 16th LAA Regiment, RA – new LAA unit raised in 1938
  - HQ, 45th, 46th, 47th and 83th LAA Batteries
- 17th LAA Regiment, RA – new LAA unit raised in 1938
  - HQ, 48th, 49th and 50th LAA Batteries
- 56th AA Brigade Company RASC
- 6th AA Divisional Signals Royal Corps of Signals
- 6th AA Divisional Workshop, Royal Army Ordnance Corps

At this point the division had a strength of 138 HAA guns (4.5-inch, 3.7-inch or 3-inch), while in the LAA role there were 23 3-inch, 35 2-pounder 'pom-pom' and 40 mm Bofors guns, and 270 light machine guns (LMGs), together with 479 searchlights.

During 1940, the RE's AA Bns were transferred to the RA as Searchlight regiments, while the AA regiments were designated Heavy AA (HAA) to distinguish them from the Light AA (LAA) regiments that were being formed.

The area covered by the 6th AA Division coincided with the RAF Sectors of Debden, North Weald, Hornchurch, Biggin Hill, and Kenley, being the major part of 11 Group of RAF Fighter Command. The coastal boundary ran from Lowestoft in the north to Worthing in the south, while the internal boundary was that of Metropolitan London.

=== Dispositions ===
On the outbreak of war the division's HAA guns were contained in four main 'gun defended areas' (GDAs) at Harwich (6 guns), Thames & Medway North (59 guns emplaced along the north bank of the Thames Estuary), Thames & Medway South (74 guns emplaced along the south bank of the Thames Estuary and defending Chatham and Rochester), and Dover (including Folkestone) (6 guns). The four GDAs were controlled by 'gun operations rooms' (GORs) at Felixstowe, Vange, Chatham and Dover respectively. Each GOR was linked directly to No. 11 Group Operations Room at Uxbridge.

Forty-five 'vulnerable points' (VPs) in the divisional area were defended by LAA guns: these included Air Ministry Experimental Stations, fighter aerodromes, dockyards, oil depots, magazines, and factories. The armament ranged from Bofors 40 mm, 3-inch 20 cwt, and 20 mm Hispano cannon to LMGs. Searchlights were deployed in single-light stations at approximately 6,000 yards (5,500 m) spacing, with 3,500 yards (3,200 m) spacing along the coast and in the GDAs. Each searchlight site was equipped with AA LMGs.

To deal with minelaying off East Anglia and Kent, the 6th AA Division organised a flotilla of three small Paddle steamers, each equipped with one Bofors gun and two S/Ls. Their role was to patrol the channels off the coast to engage enemy minelaying aircraft and to report the position of mines to the Royal Navy or to detonate them if possible. The flotilla fought a number of actions that caused a drop in enemy Seaplane activity. Later the vessels were replaced by larger ones carrying a gun-laying (GL Mk. I radar) radar set, while other GL positions were set up on the coast to track minelayers. It was possible to plot where a mine fell from an aircraft and then direct minesweepers to the position.

== Phoney War ==
Although new units were joining, AA Command had to relinquish some of the more experienced ones to supplement the AA cover for the build-up of the British Expeditionary Force (BEF) in France. The 79th (Hertfordshire Yeomanry) AA Rgt was withdrawn in January and redeployed as a Base Defence unit for the BEF. A fortnight after the Dunkirk evacuation, the regiment was evacuated from St Nazaire.

In the spring of 1940, the 6th AA Division reorganised its growing AA defences. As a result, the 29th AA Brigade, which had been purely a S/L formation, transferred its sites in Kent to the 27th AA Brigade, and took over responsibility for the HAA and LAA defence of RAF air and radar stations in Essex and for a new GDA around Harwich and the nearby harbours. The 29th AA Brigade also moved its HQ from Kensington to Boxted, Essex.

The Phoney War ended with the German invasion of France and the Low Countries on 10 May 1940. Home Forces became concerned about the threat from German paratroopers and AA Command's units were given anti-invasion roles. A plan to attach groups of riflemen from the infantry training centres to the 6th AA Division's widely spaced S/L sites foundered on the lack of men. Instead the S/L detachments were given the responsibility for attacking parachutists before they could organise, and spare men at company HQs were formed into mobile columns using requisitioned civilian transport to hunt them down. These arrangements were never tested in practice.

In July the division was joined by the 6th AA Brigade, which had been created to command the AA units in the Norwegian Campaign. After the evacuation of British forces from Norway it reformed in the 2nd AA Division as a light AA brigade in southern East Anglia, commanding widely spaced S/L sites and LAA guns scattered at VPs, mainly RAF airfields. When the brigade transferred to 6 AA Division it brought with it two S/L regiments and a newly formed LAA regiment, and was given control of the 12th LAA Rgt from the 56th LAA Brigade. The 56th Light AA Brigade retained responsibility for S/L and LAA units south of the Thames Estuary.

On 11 July 1940 (shortly before the Battle of Britain began), the 6th AA Division's guns were deployed as follows

- Dover – 18 HAA
- Thames & Medway South – 70 HAA
- Thames & Medway North – 46 HAA
- Harwich – 17 HAA
- Aerodromes – 37 HAA
- Aerodromes, vital points etc. – 101 LAA + 376 AA LMGs

At this point 6 AA Division possessed 21 GL radar sets, which increased to 35 by October.

== Battle of Britain ==
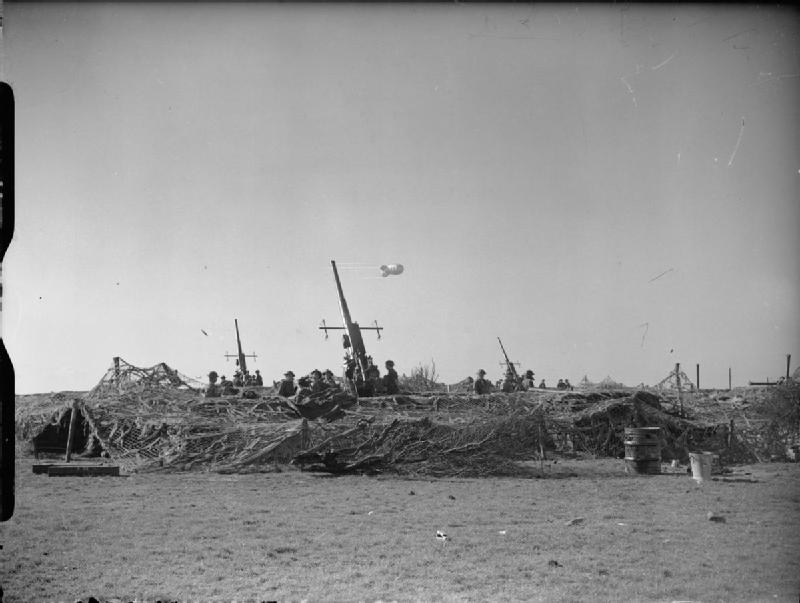
3.7-inch guns of the 75th HAA Regiment at Dover, 1940.

The Luftwaffe began its bombing offensive against the British mainland with small-scale raids on coastal targets, then in June began night raids against ports and industrial targets in the North and Midlands. This gave the AA units valuable experience, and the 6th AA Division was encouraged when its batteries shot down three raiders at night over Essex. In July, the Luftwaffe switched back to heavy daylight raids against south coast ports and shipping: the guns at Dover were in action virtually every day. Lieutenant-Colonel N.V. Sadler of the 75th HAA Rgt developed an effective system of HAA barrages over individual points in Dover Harbour and the shipping channels, underpinned by LAA fire. In one day the regiment shot down seven Junkers Ju 87 'Stukas' together with two Messerschmitt Bf 109s and a Dornier Do 215.

Next the Luftwaffe began targeting Fighter Command's airfields in South-East England with mass raids, and AA Command responded by shifting guns into the area. On 18 August, seven raids appeared in 4 1/2 hours, and the guns of the 28th and 37th AA Brigades, together with those of the neighbouring 1st and 5th AA Divisions, accounted for 23 aircraft of various types. Four days later a mass raid flew up the Thames Estuary to attack RAF Hornchurch and was engaged by the 28th and 37th AA Brigades in 'Thames North' and 'Thames South'. Their guns broke up the formations, allowing the RAF's fighters to press home their attacks, and the guns used 'pointer' rounds to mark the approach of fresh waves of bombers.

The peak intensity of the Battle of Britain came between 24 August and 15 September as the Luftwaffe put in its maximum effort to destroy Fighter Command. Mass raids aimed to saturate the defences. On 1 September over 200 aircraft attacked Maidstone, Biggin Hill, Kenley and Chatham. In joint action with the fighters, the guns of the 1st and 6th AA Divisions broke up the attacks and shot down four aircraft, but the airfields at Kenley and Biggin Hill were badly hit. Next day a mass stream of Dornier Do 17s arrived over the Medway and flew up the Thames towards Hornchurch. They at once came under heavy fire from the 3.7 and 4.5 inch HAA guns of the 28th and 37th AA Brigades on opposite sides of the river. Of about 100 bombers escorted by 190 fighters, 15 were shot down by AA fire. On 7 September over 300 aircraft approached the Thames Estuary, where the 15th HAA batteries of the 28th and 37th AA Brigade split the formations up, although the Thameshaven oil wharves, Tilbury Docks, Woolwich and West Ham were badly hit. One of the lessons of the Battle of Britain was that day bombers needed to fly in tight formation for mutual protection against fighters, but in doing so they were vulnerable to AA fire. On 8 September a formation of 15 Dornier Do 17s flew along the Thames at 15,000 feet (4,600 m). The opening salvo from a troop of four 3.7-inch guns of the 28th AA Brigade brought down the three leading aircraft and scattered the others in disorder, jettisoning their bombs as they escaped. The 6th AA Division's guns were again in prolonged action during the running battles of 15 September, when the Luftwaffe made its last and biggest attempt to gain air supremacy. AA fire accounted for eight of the 60–80 German aircraft brought down that day.

== The Blitz ==
Although there were severe night bombing raids against many industrial towns and cities of the UK during The Blitz, the main Luftwaffe effort was directed against London. The metropolis was covered by the 'London Inner Artillery Zone' (IAZ) under the 1st AA Division, adjoining which were the 'Thames North' and 'Thames South' belts controlled by the 6th AA Division. The Thames estuary was not only a primary route for bombers approaching the IAZ, but was also flanked by important industrial towns. There were over 20 HAA sites planned for Thames North (37th AA Brigade ) from Dagenham to Thorpe Bay, of which only half were occupied in September 1940 with a mixture of 3.7-inch and 4.5-inch guns. There were also LAA guns at VPs such as Purfleet, Tilbury Docks, Thameshaven, Coryton Refinery, and RAF Hornchurch. Tactical control was under the GOR at Vange. The 6th AA Division's HQ was moved to Chelmsford in Essex as the campaign progressed. The 28th AA Brigade controlled Thames South with 25 planned HAA sites, of which 16 were occupied in September. It ran along the Kent coast from Dartford to Chatham where there was a strongly defended area around the naval dockyards and aircraft factories. VPs requiring LAA defence included Crayford, Northfleet, Rochester and the Isle of Grain on the estuary together with the nearby RAF airfields at Biggin Hill and West Malling. The Thames South GOR was at Chatham. Because of the large LAA commitments, the 6th AA Division placed these under the 56th LAA Brigade. The searchlights of Thames North and Thames South had dual roles in assisting AA guns or night-fighters. The S/L layouts had been based on a spacing of 3500 yards, but due to equipment shortages this had been extended to 6,000 yards (5,500 m) by September 1940. In November this was changed to clusters of three lights to improve illumination, but this meant that the clusters had to be spaced 10,400 yards (9,500 m) apart.

=== Order of Battle ===
During the London Blitz of Autumn 1940 to Spring 1941, the division was assigned to I AA Corps and was constituted as follows:

6th AA Brigade covering Essex airfields

- 12th (Finsbury Rifles) LAA Regiment, RA – as above
- 49th LAA Regiment, RA – new unit formed 1940
- 32nd (7th City of London) Searchlight Regiment, RA – searchlight unit converted from infantry in 1935
- 33rd (St Pancras) Searchlight Regiment, RA – searchlight unit converted from infantry in 1935

28th AA Brigade covering South Thames, Chatham and Dover

- 55th HAA Regiment, RA – as above
- 58th HAA Regiment, RA – as above
- 90th HAA Regiment, RA – as above

29th AA Brigade covering Essex airfields and Harwich

- 48th LAA Regiment, RA – new unit formed 1940
- 28th (Essex) Searchlight Regiment, RA – as above
- 74th (Essex Fortress) Searchlight Regiment, RA – as above

37th AA Brigade covering North Thames

- 59th (The Essex Regiment) HAA Regiment, RA – as above
- 61st (Middlesex) HAA Regiment, RA – as above
- Part of 75th (Home Counties) (Cinque Ports) HAA Regiment, RA – as above
- 17th LAA Regiment, RA – as above
- 2nd LAA Regiment, Royal Canadian Artillery (from 1st Canadian Division)

56th AA Brigade covering Kent airfields

- 16th LAA Regiment, RA – as above
- 29th (Kent) Searchlight Regiment, RA – as above
- 73rd (Kent Fortress) Searchlight Regiment, RA – as above

In September 1940, the 6th AA Division formed the 6th Anti-Aircraft Z Regiment, Royal Artillery equipped with Z Battery rocket projectiles.

== Mid-War ==
The Blitz ended in May 1941, but occasional raids continued. Newly formed AA units joined the division, the HAA units increasingly being 'mixed' ones into which women of the Auxiliary Territorial Service were integrated. At the same time, experienced units were posted away for service overseas. This led to a continual turnover of units, which accelerated in 1942 with the preparations for Operation Torch and the need to transfer AA units from North West England to counter the Baedeker Blitz and the Luftwaffe's hit-and-run attacks against South Coast towns.

The 29th AA Brigade was disbanded on 14 February 1942 and the bulk of its responsibilities taken over by the 37th AA Brigade, the remainder by 6th AA Brigade. A newly formed 71st AA Brigade joined in June 1942.

=== Order of Battle ===
During this period the division was composed as follows (temporary attachments omitted):

- 6th AA Brigade
  - 121st HAA Rgt – from the 29th AA Brigade February 1942
  - 34th LAA Rgt – joined April 1942; to the 50th (Northumbrian) Infantry Division May 1942
  - 49th LAA Rgt – to the 28th AA BrigadeJune 1942
  - 131st LAA Rgt – converted from the 81st S/L Rgt in the 29th AA Brigade; joined April 1942 but rostered for overseas service and became unbrigaded soon afterwards
  - 32nd S/L Rgt – to the 56th AA Brigade August 1942
  - 33rd S/L Rgt
- 28th AA Brigade
  - 55th HAA Rgt – left Spring 1942 to War Office (WO) control, then to Persia and Iraq Command (PAIC)
  - 58th HAA Rgt – to the 9th AA Division Autumn 1941
  - 59th HAA Rgt – from the 37th AA Brigade Autumn 1941, to the 8th AA Division December 1941
  - 72nd (Hampshire) HAA Rgt – joined January 1942; to WO control by May 1942, then to the 71st AA Brigade
  - 76th HAA Rgt – joined June, left July 1942, later in Operation Torch
  - 85th (Tees) HAA Rgt – joined Autumn 1941; left June 1942, later Operation Torch
  - 90th HAA Rgt – unbrigaded July 1942, then to the 71st AA Brigade September 1942
  - 127th HAA Rgt – new unit formed August 1941, joined Autumn 1941, to 71 Brigade June 1942
  - 4th (Ulster) LAA Rgt – converted from the 3rd (Ulster) S/L Rgt February 1942; to the 56th AA Brigade by May 1942
  - 16th LAA Rgt – left July 1941, later to Middle East Forces (MEF)
  - 43rd LAA Rgt – joined July 1941, left December 1941; later to Ceylon
  - 49th LAA Rgt – from the 6th AA Brigade June 1942
  - 69th LAA Rgt – new unit formed December 1940; to the 56th AA Brigade January 1942
  - 132nd LAA Rgt – from the 71st AA Brigade July 1942
  - 12th AA 'Z' Rgt – from the 56th AA Brigade January 1942
- 29th AA Brigade – Disbanded 14 February 1942
  - 71st (Forth) HAA Rgt – from the 11th AA Division January 1942, then to WO control, later in Operation Torch
  - 99th (London Welsh) HAA Rgt – to Orkney & Shetland Defences (OSDEF) May 1941
  - 121st HAA Rgt – from the 37th AA Brigade May 1941; to the 6th AA Brigade February 1942
  - 48th LAA Rgt – left UK December 1941, captured in Java March 1942
  - 81st LAA Rgt – new unit formed August 1941, joined Autumn 1941; to 5 AA Division by May 1942
  - 28th S/L Rgt – to the 37th AA Brigade Spring 1942
  - 74th S/L Rgt – to the 8th AA Division January 1942
  - 81st S/L Rgt – joined January 1942; converted to the 131st LAA Rgt in 6th AA Brigade
- 37th AA Brigade
  - 59th HAA Rgt – to the 28th AA Brigade Summer 1941
  - 61st HAA Rgt – left Summer 1941; later to MEF
  - 75th HAA Rgt – from the 28th AA Brigade Summer 1941; to WO control April 1942, later to PAIC
  - 121st HAA Rgt – new unit formed January 1941; to the 29th AA Brigade May 1941
  - 17th LAA Rgt – from the 56th AA Brigade; to the 12th AA Division Autumn 1941

By December 1941, the 37th AA Brigade only had the 75th HAA Rgt under its command; it was then joined by:

  - 66th HAA Rgt – joined August 1942
  - 71st HAA Rgt – from the 29th AA Brigade May 1942; left July 1942, later Operation Torch
  - 84th HAA Rgt – joined Spring 1942; to the 56th AA Brigade August 1942
  - 102nd HAA Rgt– joined August 1942
  - 104th HAA Rgt – joined April 1942
  - 131st HAA Rgt – joined July 1942, to the 4th AA Division August 1942
  - 167th (Mixed) HAA Rgt – new unit formed August, joined September 1942
  - 4th LAA Rgt – from the 28th AA Brigade, then unbrigaded July 1942
  - 31st LAA Rgt – joined June 1942; unbrigaded August 1942
  - 86th LAA Rgt – joined from the 56th AA Brigade April 1942
  - 140th LAA Rgt – new unit formed July, joined August 1942
  - 28th S/L Rgt – from the 29th AA Brigade Spring 1942, to the 56th AA Brigade June 1942
- 56th AA Brigade
  - 4th LAA Rgt – from the 37th AA Brigade Spring 1942
  - 69th LAA Rgt – from the 28th AA Brigade January 1942; to India February 1942
  - 86th LAA Rgt – from the 1st AA Division January 1942, to the 37th AA Brigade April 1942
  - 50th LAA Rgt – from the 7th AA Division March 1942
  - 29th S/L Rgt – to the 8th AA Division January 1942
  - 73rd S/L Rgt
  - 6th AA 'Z' Rgt – to the 1st AA Division Summer 1941
  - 12th AA 'Z' Rgt – new unit formed March 1941; to the 28th AA Brigade January 1942

By May 1942, the 56th AA Brigade only had the 4th LAA and 73rd S/L under its command; it was then joined by:

  - 84th HAA Rgt – from the 37th AA Brigade August, left September 1942, later in Operation Torch
  - 101st HAA Rgt – joined June 1942, left July 1942, later to India
  - 66th LAA Rgt – joined June 1942, to the 71st AA Brigade same month
  - 28th S/L Rgt – from the 37th AA Brigade June 1942
  - 32nd S/L Rgt – from the 6th AA Brigade August 1942
- 71st AA Brigade – joined June 1942
  - 72nd HAA Rgt – from WO control (previously the 28th AA Brigade) June, left July 1942; later to Operation Torch
  - 76th HAA Rgt – from the 28th AA Brigade July 1942; left September 1942, later in Operation Torch
  - 85th HAA Rgt – from the 28th AA Brigade July 1942; later in Operation Torch
  - 90th HAA Rgt – from unbrigaded (previously the 28th AA Brigade) September 1942
  - 127th HAA Rgt – from the 28th AA Brigade June 1942
  - 66th LAA Rgt – from the 56th AA Brigade June 1942; left September 1942, later to MEF
  - 122nd LAA Rgt – converted from 45 S/L Rgt, joined July 1942
  - 129th LAA Rgt – converted from 35 S/L Rgt, joined September 1942, then to the 28th AA Brigade
  - 132nd LAA Rgt – converted from 85th S/L Rg, joined June 1942, to the 28th AA Brigade July 1942

The increased sophistication of Operations Rooms and communications was reflected in the growth in support units, which attained the following organisation by May 1942:

- 6th AA Divisional Signals
  - 6th AA Divisional Mixed Signal Unit HQ
  - HQ No 1 Company:
    - 6th AA Division Mixed Signal Office Section
    - 6th AA Brigade Signal Office Mixed Sub-Section
    - 102nd RAF Fighter Sector Sub-Section
    - 103rd RAF Fighter Sector Sub-Section
    - 329th AA Gun Operations Room Mixed Signal Section
    - 37th AA Brigade Signal Office Mixed Sub-Section
    - 309th AA Gun Operations Room Mixed Signal Section
    - 15th AA Line Maintenance Section
  - HQ No 2 Company:
    - 328th AA Gun Operations Room Mixed Signal Section
    - 28th AA Brigade Signal Office Mixed Sub-Section
    - 56th AA Brigade Signal Office Mixed Sub-Section
    - 101st RAF Fighter Sector Sub-Section
    - 310th AA Gun Operations Room Mixed Signal Section
    - 71st AA Brigade Signal Office Mixed Sub-Section
    - 16th AA Line Maintenance Section
- 6th AA Divisional RASC
  - 919th and 921st Companies
- 6th AA Divisional Company, Royal Army Medical Corps
- 6th AA Divisional Workshop Company, Royal Army Ordnance Corps

The RAOC workshop companies became part of the new Royal Electrical and Mechanical Engineers (REME) during 1942.

== Disbandment ==
A reorganisation of AA Command in October 1942 saw the AA divisions disbanded and replaced by a number of AA Groups more closely aligned with the groups of Fighter Command. Most of 6th AA Division became 2nd AA Group cooperating with No. 11 Group RAF.

== See also ==
- List of British divisions in World War II
- British Army Order of Battle (September 1939)

== Online sources ==
- Anti-Aircraft Command (1939) at British Military History
- Generals of World War II
- Orders of Battle at Patriot Files
- Royal Artillery 1939–1945
