= 4th Home Counties Brigade, Royal Field Artillery =

IV Home Counties (H) Brigade, RFA 52nd (Kent) Medium Brigade, RA 58th (Kent) HAA Regiment, RA 458 HAA Regiment, RA
- Cap Badge of the Royal Artillery (pre-1953)
- Active: 1908–1969
- Country: United Kingdom
- Branch: Territorial Force
- Type: Artillery Regiment
- Role: Field Artillery (1908–19); Medium Artillery (1920–35); Anti-Aircraft (1935–69)
- Garrison/HQ: Erith; Sidcup
- Engagements: Western Front (World War I); Battle of Britain; The Blitz; North Africa; Pantellaria; Italy

The IV Home Counties (Howitzer) Brigade, Royal Field Artillery was a new volunteer unit formed in Kent as part of the Territorial Force (TF) in 1908. It saw active service on the Western Front during World War I and was reconstituted as medium artillery in the interwar years. Later it converted to anti-aircraft artillery, in which role it served in The Blitz, North Africa and Italy during World War II and continued under various designations until its disbandment in 1969.

== Origin ==
IV Home Counties Brigade was a volunteer unit of the Royal Field Artillery raised at Erith to provide Howitzer support to the TF's Home Counties Division. It had the following composition:

- 4th Kent (Howitzer) Battery
- 5th Kent (Howitzer) Battery
- 4th Home Counties (Howitzer) Ammunition Column

== World War I ==
On the outbreak of World War I, most of the Home Counties Division was sent to Gibraltar and India to relieve Regular troops for service in Europe. However, the howitzer brigade did not accompany the division; instead, it was posted to the 27th Division forming at Winchester from these troops returned from India. The brigade (without guns) provided the Divisional Ammunition Column and embarked for France on 21 December 1914. During 1915 the 27th Division was engaged in the Battle of St Eloi (14–15 March) and the Second Battle of Ypres (22 April–25 May).

On 3 August 1914, TF units were authorised to raise 2nd Line units composed of men ineligible for overseas service and new recruits. Units forming the 2nd Home Counties Division (later numbered 67th) began to gather, and the 2nd/IV Home Counties Bde formed at Erith, though it had no guns or ammunition. However, in June 1915 the 1st/IV Home Counties Bde returned to England from France and joined the new division.

By the end of 1915, the 67th Division was still not fully trained or equipped. On 22 December, the 1st/IV Bde left the division to prepare for overseas service independently. The following day the 2nd/IV Bde joined the division, based at Seal, Kent. At the end of January 1916, the 1st/IV handed over its eight obsolete 5-inch howitzers to 2nd/IV, and received new 4.5-inch howitzers in their place. On 10 March, it disembarked at Le Havre and joined the British Expeditionary Force's Fourth Army.

On 9 June 1916, the brigade joined 63rd (Royal Naval) Division, which had recently arrived in France from the Mediterranean and had no artillery. At the end of the month the brigade was renumbered as 223rd or CCXXIII (Howitzer) Brigade, Royal Field Artillery. The two batteries (1/4th Kent and 1/5th Kent) became A (H) Battery and B (H) Battery. However, they were immediately reassigned so that the rest of the divisional artillery brigades (from the disbanded 63rd (2nd Northumbrian) Division) each had a howitzer battery, while the brigade ammunition column was absorbed into 63rd Divisional Ammunition Column. A Battery went to CCCXVIII Bde, which adopted the number CCXXIII Bde. Henceforth, the brigade comprised three six-gun 18-pounder batteries (A, B and C) from the North of England and D (H) Battery (formerly 1/4th Kent (H) Bty), which was later joined by half of 2/4th Durham (H) Bty to make it up to six guns. In this composite form, the brigade served with 63rd Division for the rest of the war, participating in the final phase of the Battle of the Somme (November 1916), the Battle of Arras (April 1917), the final phases of the Battle of Passchendaele (November–December 1917), the German spring offensive (March–April 1918) and the final Hundred Days Offensive (August–November 1918).

In May 1916, 2nd/IV Home Counties Bde was numbered 338th or CCCXXXVIII (Howitzer) Brigade, Royal Field Artillery, but during the year it too was broken up, its two batteries being reassigned to CCCXXXV and CCCXXXVI (formerly 2nd/I and 2nd/II Home Counties) brigades. These brigades never went overseas but remained in the UK, supplying drafts to frontline units.

== Interwar years ==
=== 52nd (Kent) Medium Brigade, RGA ===
The 63rd Division was demobilised in early 1919 and CCXXIII Brigade went into suspended animation. The unit was reformed on 7 February 1920 as a medium artillery brigade in the Royal Garrison Artillery (RGA), initially numbered 13th, but with the re-establishment of the TF as the Territorial Army in 1921, the unt was re-designated 52nd (Kent) Medium Brigade, RGA with the following composition:

- HQ at Erith
- 205 (Chatham and Faversham) Medium Battery at Sittingbourne – formerly Home Counties (Kent) Heavy Battery, RGA
- 206 (Erith) Medium Battery (Howitzer) – formerly 4th Kent Battery
- 207 (Erith) Medium Battery (Howitzer) – formerly 5th Kent Battery
- 208 (Bromley) Medium Battery (Howitzer) at Penge – formerly Kent Cyclist Battalion

On 1 June 1924, the RFA and RGA were subsumed into the Royal Artillery (RA).

=== 58th (Kent) Anti-Aircraft Brigade, RA ===
In 1935, the unit was one of a number of medium artillery units selected for conversion to the Anti-Aircraft (AA) role as 58th (Kent) Anti-Aircraft Brigade, RA, and was assigned to 28th (Thames and Medway) Anti-Aircraft Group of 1st Anti-Aircraft Division. In April the following year, 205 Battery was transferred to the smaller 55th (Kent) Anti-Aircraft Brigade, RA based at Rochester. When the TA was augmented at the time of the Munich Crisis, a new 264 Battery was raised on 1 October 1938 within 58th AA Bde at Dartford. On 1 January 1939, the RA redesignated its 'brigades' as 'regiment'.

In May 1939, a new 6th AA Division was formed within Anti-Aircraft Command for the air defence of the Thames Estuary, Kent and Essex, and the 28th (Thames and Medway) AA Brigade and its units transferred to the new formation. 28th AA Bde was responsible for the 'Thames South' layout of gun sites. This organisation was in place when war broke out in September 1939.

== World War II ==
=== Phoney War ===
Opportunities for action were rare during the Phoney War; however, on the night of 22/23 November 1939, the HAA guns of 28 AA Bde manning the 'Thames South' layout combined with those of 37 AA Bde on the other bank of the river ('Thames North') to engage at least two enemy mine-laying aircraft that had strayed into the mouth of the Estuary. One wrecked aircraft was found on the marshes and credited to 206 Bty of 58th HAA Rgt at Allhallows, Kent.

On 1 June 1940, along with other AA units equipped with older 3-inch, newer 3.7-inch, or 4.5-inch AA guns, the 58th was designated a Heavy AA Regiment.

=== Battle of Britain ===
The regiment was heavily engaged throughout the Battle of Britain defending the Medway Towns against German bombers. On 18 August, for example, German air raids appeared over RAF airfields at West Malling, Manston, Kenley, Biggin Hill, Gravesend and the town of Sevenoaks, all within four and a half hours in the afternoon. All the gunsites of Thames South and its neighbours were in action and accounted for 23 enemy aircraft. Four days later, a mass raid flew up the Thames Estuary to attack RAF Hornchurch on the Essex shore: the raid was broken up by the guns, and then the fighters of No. 11 Group RAF attacked. Follow-up raids were marked for the fighters by 'pointer' rounds of HAA fire. On 1 September, over 200 aircraft attacked Maidstone, Biggin Hill, Kenley and Chatham: in joint action with the fighters, the guns broke up the formations and shot down four aircraft, but the airfields at Biggin Hill and Kenley were badly hit. Next day, a mass raid arrived over the Medway and flew up the Thames towards Hornchurch. They came under heavy fire from the 3.7s and 4.5s and 15 were shot down before the fighters took over. On 7 September, heavy raids up the estuary attacked oil wharves at Thameshaven, Tilbury Docks and Woolwich Arsenal: a total of 25 aircraft were destroyed by AA guns and fighters. On 15 September, remembered as the zenith of the battle, the guns were in prolonged combat, especially with aircraft over Chatham in the morning, and again in the afternoon.

=== The Blitz ===
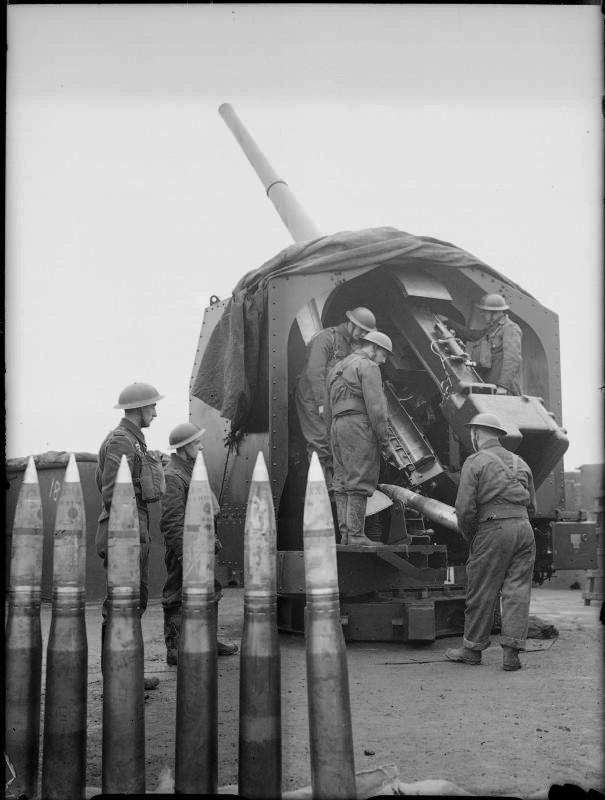
4.5-inch AA gun and crew of 207 Battery, 58th HAA Regiment, near Sittingbourne, Kent, January 1941

After 15 September, the intensity of Luftwaffe day raids declined rapidly, and it began a prolonged night bombing campaign over London and industrial towns (The Blitz). This meant that the gunsites of 'Thames South' were in action night after night as the bomber streams approached the London Inner Artillery Zone (IAZ). This period of intense activity lasted until May 1941, but occasional raids kept the AA defences on high alert.

On 12 July 1941, the experienced 206 (Erith) HAA Bty transferred to 60th (City of London) HAA Rgt. The regiment sent a cadre to 206th HAA Training Rgt, Arborfield, to provide the basis for a new 419 HAA Bty; this was formed on 10 April 1941 and joined the regiment on 7 July 1941 to replace 206 HAA Bty. The regiment later provided the cadre for 474 HAA Bty formed on 4 September 1941 at 207th HAA Training Rgt, Devizes, which joined 138th HAA Rgt. In the autumn of 1941, the regiment left 28 AA Bde and joined 5 AA Bde in 9th AA Division covering South West England, while 419 Bty joined 474 HAA Bty at 138th HAA Rgt in 9th AA Division on 17 December 1941.

By May 1942, the regiment had transferred again, to 44th AA Bde in 4th AA Division in Manchester. However, that month, the regiment left AA Command and prepared to go overseas as a mobile unit.

In September 1942, 58th (Kent) HAA Rgt joined First Army with the following composition:

- 207 (Erith) HAA Bty
- 208 (Bromley) HAA Bty
- 264 (Dartford) HAA Bty
- 58 HAA Rgt Signal Section, Royal Corps of Signals
- 58 HAA Workshop Section, Royal Electrical and Mechanical Engineers
- 58 HAA Rgt Platoon, Royal Army Service Corps

=== North Africa ===
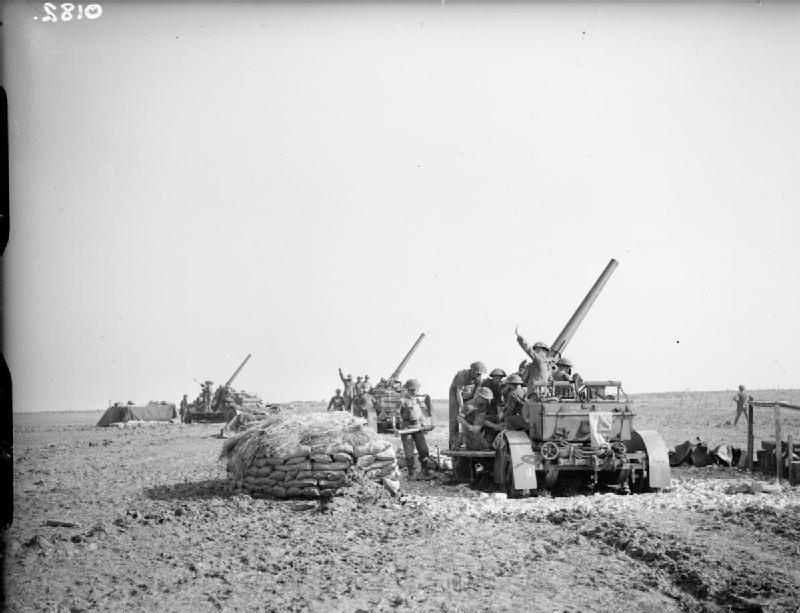
3-inch AA guns on cruciform travelling carriages.

58th HAA Rgt was selected for the landings in North Africa in November 1942 (Operation Torch) with First Army. Two batteries formed part of 22 AA Bde, regarded as the best trained in mobile operations and amphibious warfare. They were equipped with the older 3-inch 20 cwt gun on a modernised trailer, rather than the newer 3.7-inch. This was because the lighter 3-inch was easier and quicker to deploy in the rough country anticipated for the campaign. After sailing from the River Clyde they were landed on the coast of Algeria as infantry in the first flight of landing craft on 8 November, to be followed later by their heavy equipment. After the initial fighting, 22 AA Bde accompanied the leading elements of First Army on their long march eastwards, while 58th's batteries remained at Algiers to unload their guns and equipment and take up positions around the harbour and airfields. There was congestion at the docks, and AA guns had been given low priority in loading the supply ships, so the regiment could get only four guns into action by 10 November, eight more on the 11th, and four more on the 12th, during which time the port and airfields were under air attack. Follow-up elements of the regiment were lost when the liner Cathay was sunk on 11 November, and more men were lost in other convoys.

Axis air command reacted quickly to the Allied invasion. As the AA troops moved into their positions, they were dive-bombed in the open, particularly at Djidjelli airfield. One troop of 207th Bty and a troop of 45th LAA Rgt rapidly organised barrages in close defence, so effectively that three enemy aircraft were destroyed and the gun positions survived. There was a repeated attack, by Junkers Ju 87s and Ju 88s flying at 5000–6000 feet, on 22 November, which lasted two hours. The harbour at Bône became the most heavily attacked target in North Africa, and a troop of 58th HAA was sent to reinforce the AA defences there. On 21 November, they fought raids by Ju88s, which set buildings and stores ablaze, and destroyed the AA units' small number of vehicles.

During the next few weeks, AA defences for the Algiers area were built up into an integrated joint-service organisation, with the RAF installing early-warning radar and an operations room, and US Army AA Artillery units acquiring operational experience alongside British units. As the build-up continued, 22 AA Bde could be released from commitments in the rear areas and assigned to airfield defence for No. 242 Group RAF. By January 1943, 58 HAA Rgt had a troop at Souk-el-Khemis Airfield, another at Souk-el-Arba Airfield and railhead, and a battery defending the port of Bougies under 52 AA Bde, while the third battery was supporting the advance of V Corps. Later. the battery from Bougies was released and the airfield defences raised to a battery apiece by March. In the final phase of the Tunisian Campaign (Operation Vulcan), 58 HAA came under 52 AA Bde as part of a mobile AA reserve ready to move up to Bizerta and Tunis immediately behind the battle groups. Some AA guns were deployed 'protecting' dummy armour assembly positions to deceive the enemy. As the Allies moved into Bizerta on 7 May. the AA advance parties came under shellfire from the remaining enemy outside the town. The campaign ended on 12 May 1943, with 58th HAA Rgt claiming to have shot down 37 enemy aircraft during its course. Most of the AA units then settled down in defence and training for forthcoming operations.

=== Pantellaria ===
In the words of the Regimental Historian, 'One unit however, had only a short respite from new duties; 58th HAA Regiment, which had taken part in the original landing, was withdrawn from Bizerta, soon after it arrived there, to join a force for the invasion of Pantellaria'. An amphibious assault (Operation Corkscrew) on the Italian island lying between Tunisia and Sicily was accomplished on 11 June 1943. 207th HAA Battery embarked in landing craft on the night of 12/13 June, followed by its guns, 264th HAA Bty embarked on 14 June and RHQ and 208th Bty the following day. The batteries deployed and a regimental Gun Operations Room (GOR) was set up, fed by gun-laying GL radar sets. Enemy air attacks mounted from Sicily lasted for about two weeks after the invasion during which time 58th HAA fought a number of actions and brought down three enemy aircraft. 'The unit was then able to stand down and rest at its own island rest camp'.

=== Italy ===
58th HAA Regiment was not involved in the invasion of Sicily (Operation Husky), but rejoined 22 AA Bde in mainland Italy in late October 1943 to take over the air defence of Naples. The defended area over the port, the anchorages and adjacent airfields was declared an Inner Artillery Zone (IAZ), giving AA guns priority over fighters at night. The problem of radar coverage of the Bay of Naples was partly solved when the new centimetric Mk. III GL radar became available. Luftwaffe raids over the city were frequent and heavy during November.

The deployment at Naples turned into a long-term commitment. Heavy air raids resumed in March 1944, after which they progressively declined, and AA defence strength was also reduced, though 58th HAA Rgt remained there until the end of the war in Europe. 58th HAA Rgt with 207, 208 and 264 HAA Btys was placed in suspended animation on 15 December 1945.

== Postwar ==
The regiment was reconstituted in the TA on 1 January 1947 as 458 (Kent) (Mixed) Heavy Anti-Aircraft Regiment, RA (TA) ('Mixed' indicating that it included members of the Women's Royal Army Corps). The regimental HQ was now at Sidcup, and it was attached to 54 AA Bde (the old 28th (Thames and Medway) AA Bde) until that formation was disbanded the following year.

AA Command was disbanded in 1955 and there was a considerable reduction in AA units: 458 HAA was amalgamated with 564 (Mixed) Light Anti-Aircraft/Searchlight Regiment and 608 (Kent) (Mixed) Heavy Anti-Aircraft Regiment to form a new 458 (Kent) Light Anti-Aircraft Regiment, RA (TA) with the following organisation:

- RHQ Battery – from 608 Regiment
- P Battery – from 458 Regiment
- Q Battery – from 564 Regiment
- R Battery – from 564 Regiment
- S Battery – from 608 Regiment

The regiment formed part of 30th Anti-Aircraft Brigade, a TA formations whose headquarters was at Edenbridge, Kent.

In 1961, 458 Regiment (less one battery that merged into 211 (Thames & Medway) Field Squadron, Royal Engineers) amalgamated with 265 LAA and 570 LAA regiments, forming P (Kent) Battery in a new 265 LAA Regiment. Further reorganisation saw P (Kent) Battery, representing the whole of 265 Regiment, absorbed into a new London and Kent Regiment (TA), but when this was reduced to a cadre in 1969, the 4th Home Counties lineage disappeared.

Successor units still occupy Grove Park and Bexleyheath drill-halls, as 265 (Home Counties) Battery, 106th (Yeomanry) Regiment, Royal Artillery and 265 (Kent and County of London Yeomanry) Support Squadron, Royal Corps of Signals. Both units strive to continue and maintain the traditions and history of their predecessor Regiments.

Regimental silver is held in trust and displayed within The Army Reserve Centre, Baring Road, Grove Park, London SE12 0BH. This can be viewed at by prior appointment.

== Honorary Colonels ==
- Col W.C. Hale, OBE, MC, TD, appointed 4 August 1937
