= 29th (East Anglian) Anti-Aircraft Brigade =

29th (East Anglian) Anti-Aircraft Brigade 55 (East Anglian) Anti-Aircraft Brigade
- Active: 8 January 1936–14 February 1942; 1 January 1947–9 September 1948
- Country: United Kingdom
- Branch: Territorial Army
- Type: Anti-Aircraft Brigade
- Role: Air Defence
- Part of: 1st AA Division; 6th AA Division; 1 AA Group
- Garrison/HQ: Kensington (peacetime); Boxted (1939–40); Coxtie Green (1941–42); Barking (1947-48)
- Engagements: Battle of Britain; The Blitz

Commanders
- Notable commanders: Brigadier Kenneth Gourlay, DSO, OBE, MC

29th (East Anglian) Anti-Aircraft Brigade was an air defence formation of Britain's Territorial Army (TA) before and during the Second World War. It defended East Anglian airfields and ports during the Battle of Britain and The Blitz. It was reformed in the postwar TA.

== Origin ==
29th (East Anglian) Anti-Aircraft Group was organised in January 1936 at RAF North Weald, Essex, as part of 1st Anti-Aircraft Division. Its first commander was Brig N.M. McLeod, DSO, MC, appointed on 8 January 1936. The formation's original composition was as follows:

- 59th (The Essex Regiment) Anti-Aircraft Brigade, RA (TA): a Heavy Anti-Aircraft (HAA) gun unit formed in 1935 by conversion of 7th Battalion, Essex Regiment.
  - HQ at Walthamstow
  - 164th Anti-Aircraft Battery at Walthamstow
  - 167th Anti-Aircraft Battery att Leyton
  - 193rd Anti-Aircraft Battery at Leigh-on-Sea
- 28th (Essex) Anti-Aircraft Battalion, RE (TA): a searchlight unit formed in 1935 from Essex Group AA Companies, Royal Engineers.
  - HQ at Brentwood
  - 309th (Essex) Anti-Aircraft Company at Harlow
  - 310th (Essex) Anti-Aircraft Company at Epping
  - 311th (Essex) Anti-Aircraft Company at Brentwood
  - 312th (Essex) Anti-Aircraft Company at Upminster
- 33rd (St Pancras) Anti-Aircraft Battalion, RE (TA): a searchlight unit formed in 1935 by conversion of 19th London Regiment (St Pancras).
  - HQ at Camden Town
  - 332nd Anti-Aircraft Company at Camden Town
  - 333rd Anti-Aircraft Company at Camden Town
  - 334th Anti-Aircraft Company at Camden Town
- 36th (Middlesex) Anti-Aircraft Battalion, RE (TA): a searchlight unit raised in 1936.
  - HQ at Hendon
  - 317th Anti-Aircraft Company at Hendon
  - 345th Anti-Aircraft Company at Hendon
  - 346th Anti-Aircraft Company at Hendon

29th and the other Anti-Aircraft groups adopted the more normal formation title of 'Brigades' after the Royal Artillery redesignated its Brigades as 'Regiments' in 1938. 29th AA Brigade's peacetime headquarters (HQ) was at 28 Roland Gardens, Kensington. Brigadier Kenneth Gourlay, DSO, MC, of the Royal Engineers, was appointed to command the brigade on 23 January 1939.

== Second World War ==
=== Mobilisation ===
The TA's AA units were mobilised on 23 September 1938 during the Munich Crisis, with units manning their emergency positions within 24 hours, even though many did not yet have their full complement of men or equipment. The emergency lasted three weeks, and they were stood down on 13 October. In February 1939 the existing AA defences came under the control of a new Anti-Aircraft Command. In June, as the international situation worsened, a partial mobilisation of the TA was begun in a process known as 'couverture', whereby each AA unit did a month's tour of duty in rotation to man selected AA gun and searchlight positions. On 24 August, ahead of the declaration of war, AA Command was fully mobilised at its war stations.

On 7 September 1939, operational control of 29th AA Bde was transferred to 6th AA Division, which was formed in 1939 to take responsibility for air defence of the Thames Estuary, Essex and Kent. At this point the brigade was entirely composed of searchlight units:

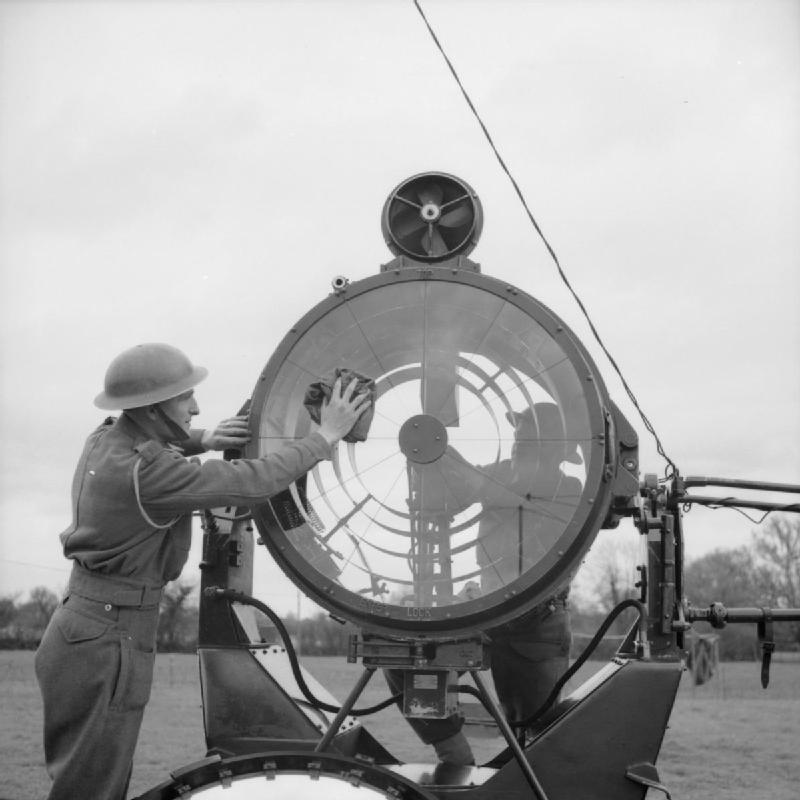
Soldiers cleaning a searchlight 1941.

- 28th (Essex) AA Bn RE
- 29th (Kent) Anti-Aircraft Battalion, Royal Engineers: a searchlight unit with a similar history to 28th (Essex).
- 32nd (7th City of London) AA Bn RE: a searchlight unit with a similar history to 33rd (St Pancras), based in Finsbury Square; transferred to 41st (London) Anti-Aircraft Brigade in 2nd AA Division during September 1939
- 33rd (St Pancras) AA Bn, RE: transferred to 41 AA Bde in 2 AA Division during September 1939
- 73rd (Kent Fortress AA Bn) RE: a new searchlight unit formed in April 1939, incorporating 322 and 347 (Kent) AA Company from 29th (Kent) AA Bn and 331 AA Companies from 32nd (7th City of London) AA Bn. 347 (Kent) AA Company had been formed by personnel drawn from the three Electric Light and Works Companies of the Kent Fortress Royal Engineers. It was based at Bexleyheath.
- 74th (Essex Fortress) AA Bn RE: a new searchlight unit formed at Tottenham in April 1939, incorporating 310 AA Company from 28th (Essex) AA Bn, 335 AA Company from 33rd (St Pancras) AA Bn and 469 AA Company from the Essex Fortress Engineers.
- 29th AA Bde Company Royal Army Service Corps

=== Phoney War ===
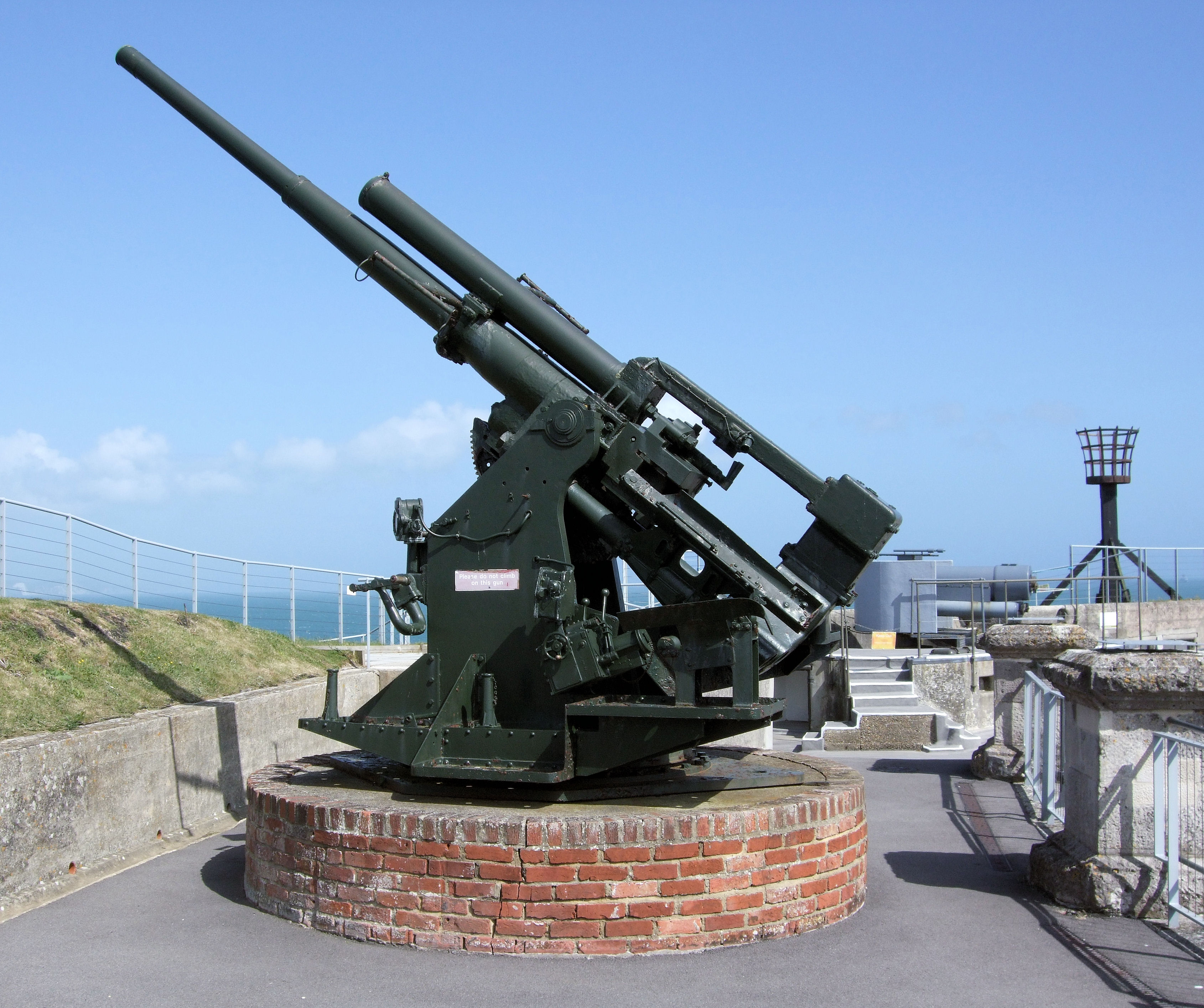
3.7-inch gun preserved at Nothe Fort, Weymouth

In the spring of 1940, 6 AA Division reorganised its growing AA defences. As a result, 29th AA Bn and its S/L sites in Kent were transferred away from 29 AA Bde to 27 (Home Counties) AA Bde, while 32nd and 33rd AA Bns and their sites in Essex and Suffolk returned from 41 AA Bde to 29 AA Bde, together with 119 Light Anti-Aircraft (LAA) Bty (of 'P' LAA Rgt) with its Troops based at the RAF fighter and radar stations at Debden, Wattisham and Darsham. 29 AA Brigade then took on responsibility from 37 AA Bde for the HAA guns at Harwich (an important anti-invasion naval base), RAF North Weald and RAF Debden manned by 90th HAA Rgt (272, 284, 285 HAA Btys), together with the Gun Operations Room (GOR) at Harwich.

Afterwards 90th HAA Rgt was replaced by 99th (London Welsh) HAA Rgt (302, 303, 307, 318 HAA Btys) and the whole of 'P' LAA Rgt (49, 95 and 119 LAA Btys) was transferred to 29 AA Bde and its batteries transferred to a newly raised 48th LAA Rgt.

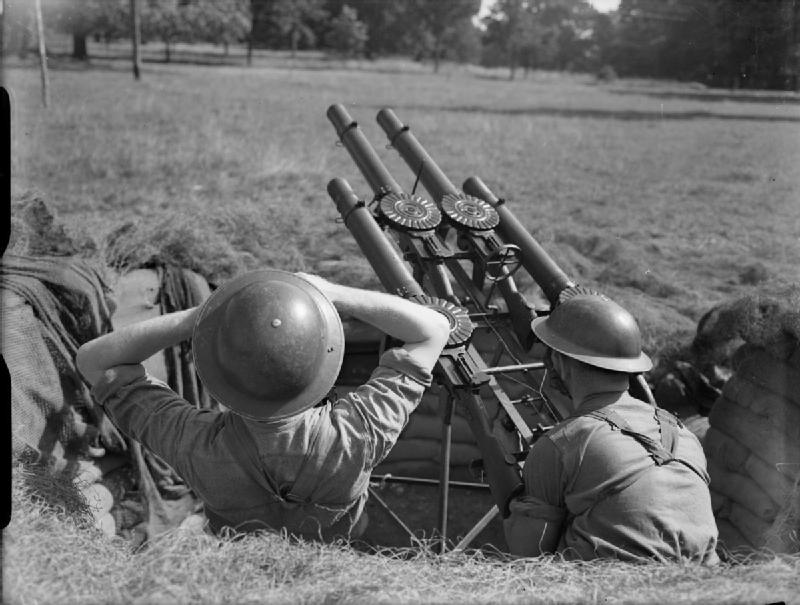
Quadruple Lewis gun LAA mounting, 1941

HAA gun sites were equipped with 3.7-inch or the older 3-inch guns. Although LAA units were receiving Bofors 40 mm guns, many of the sites only had LMGs, though some like the Royal Naval Mining Depot at Wrabness at least had quadruple mountings. The first, very secret, Gun-Laying Radar Mk I sets began to appear in May 1940, with one being stationed at Landguard Fort at Harwich to replace the old sound-locator at the S/L site operated by 469 AA Co, 74th AA Bn.

In May 1940 Brigade HQ shifted to Boxted House in Boxted near Colchester in Essex. During August 1940 the AA Battalions were transferred from the Royal Engineers to the Royal Artillery, when they were designated Searchlight Regiments.

=== Battle of Britain ===
The Phoney War ended with the German invasion of France and the Low Countries on 10 May 1940. Home Forces became concerned about the threat from German paratroopers and AA Command's units were given anti-invasion roles. A plan to attach groups of riflemen from the infantry training centres to 6 AA Division's widely spaced S/L sites foundered on the lack of men. Instead the S/L detachments themselves were given the responsibility for attacking parachutists before they could organise, and spare men at company HQs were formed into mobile columns using requisitioned civilian transport to hunt them down. These arrangements were never tested in practice.

At the end of May the British Expeditionary Force was evacuated from Dunkirk, and the Germans began preparations to invade South East England. In late June the Luftwaffe began small day and night raids on Ipswich and the Harwich Gun Defence Area (GDA) and during July 1940 there were almost daily attacks on shipping off the East Coast. In August, while the Battle of Britain was progressing by day over Kent and Essex, Luftwaffe seaplanes regularly dropped Parachute mines in the harbours and estuaries by night, which 29 AA Bde's guns and S/Ls attempted to counter.

By now, 29 AA Bde was only responsible for the Harwich GDA (covering Harwich, Ipswich, Felixstowe, Parkeston and Dovercourt) and RAF airfields in Essex and Suffolk, 73rd AA Bn and its sites south of the Thames having been transferred to 56 Light AA Bde command in early July. (Note: One normally reliable source states that 29 AA Bde was responsible for Kent in Autumn 1940, but this contradicted by the brigade's own War Diary.)

On 15 August Erprobungsgruppe 210 slipped through to attack RAF Martlesham Heath and got away without loss, despite being engaged by the Harwich AA guns while withdrawing.

On 24 August North Weald was badly damaged by a raid, but remained serviceable. Then on 26 August, Luftflotte 2 sent a large raid to attack the fighter bases at Debden, North Weald and Hornchurch; the attackers missed the latter two targets, but Debden was hard hit. Debden was attacked again on 30 August, and North Weald received a raid on 31 August that was engaged by 285 HAA Bty, and a Heinkel He 111 was shot down by the AA light machine gun (LMG) of a S/L site.

Brentwood, Essex, in the southern part of 29 AA Bde's area, was bombed on 7 September during the first big daylight air raid on London, which heralded the Luftwaffe's shift away from RAF airfields to bombing cities.

=== The Blitz ===
As the Battle of Britain merged into the night Blitz during September 1940, the brigade's area was regularly crossed by night raids heading for London and the industrial cities of the Midlands, which the S/L sites strove to track for the night-fighters and HAA guns, often causing the raiders to jettison their bombs (frequently near the AA sites) and turn back. Low-flying daylight intruders sometimes exchanged fire with the AA LMGs at S/L sites.

Between 25 October 1940 and 2 January 1941, units of the Corpo Aereo Italiano based in Belgium made 11 day and night attacks on the East Coast, all but one of which targeted Harwich and Ipswich.

In November, 29 AA Bde HQ moved from Boxted to Coxtie House, Coxtie Green, near Brentwood.

By December 1940 all S/Ls in the brigade's area, except the coastal sites, had been 'clustered' The cluster system was an attempt to improve the chances of picking up enemy bombers and keeping them illuminated for engagement by AA guns or Night fighters. Eventually, one light in each cluster was to be equipped with searchlight control (SLC) radar and act as 'master light', but the radar equipment was still in short supply.

=== Summer 1941 ===
The Blitz ended in May 1941. By August 1941 the following changes to 29 AA Bde's order of battle and dispositions had taken place:

- 99th (London Welsh) HAA Rgt – to Orkney & Shetland Defences (OSDEF) May 1941
  - 302, 303, 318 HAA Btys
- 121st HAA Rgt – from 37 AA Bde to relieve 99th HAA Rgt May 1941
  - 385 HAA Bty at RAF North Weald, RAF Debden
  - 387 HAA Bty at RAF Martlesham, RAF Wattisham, Ipswich Airport
  - 388 HAA Bty at Harwich
- 48th LAA Rgt
  - 49 LAA Bty at Chelmsford
  - 95 LAA Bty at RAF North Weald, RAF Stapleford Tawney
  - 182 LAA Bty – to War Office (WO) control 30 May 1941
  - 242 LAA Bty at Wrabness, Great Bromley, Parkeston Quay – joined from 77th LAA Rgt July 1941
- 49th LAA Rgt – from 6 AA Bde; later to 78th Infantry Division
  - 84 LAA Bty at RAF Martlesham
  - 119 LAA Bty at Landguard
- 28th S/L Rgt in clusters
  - 309, 311, 312 S/L Btys
- 74th S/L Rgt in clusters, coastal sites and RAF Martlesham
  - 310, 335, 469 S/L Btys

During the summer of 1941 the Luftwaffe continued minelaying and intruder raids against airfields in 29 AA Bde's sector at night, against which S/Ls could be effective – on one occasion a Junkers Ju 88 night-fighter attacking British bombers was dazzled and crashed. In August a daylight raid using cloud cover was made against the radar station at Great Bromley.

=== Winter 1941-42 ===
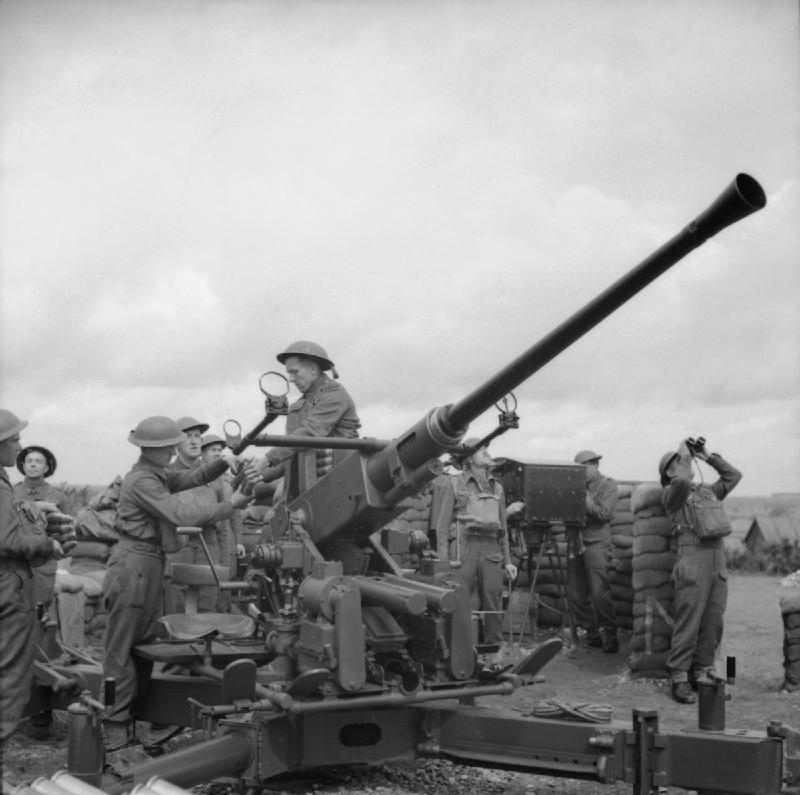
40 mm Bofors gun, 1941

By October 1941 the availability of SLC radar was sufficient to allow AA Command's S/L sites to be 'declustered' into single-light sites spaced at 10,400-yard intervals in 'Indicator Belts' along the coast and 'Killer Belts' at 6000-yard spacing to cooperate with the RAF's Night-fighters. 29th AA Brigade deployed 90 mm S/Ls in the indicator belt and 150 mm S/Ls in the killer belt, while a mixture of 90 mm and 120 mm lights were deployed in the Harwich GDA, spaced at 10,400 yards in the inner zone and 6000 yards in the outer. All these S/L sites were manned by 28 S/L Rgt and by 328 and 330 Btys of 32 S/L Rt, while 74 S/L Rgt was concentrated at Clacton-on-Sea and then moved to Kent, leaving the brigade's area.

The number of Bofors gun-equipped LAA units available to AA Command to protect Vital Points such as airfields was growing, albeit slowly. In November the brigade established a 'silent' LAA practice camp for 6 AA Division at Dovercourt, and AA Command's No 16 LAA Practice Camp at Clacton, with live firing ranges out to sea, was also in the brigade's area of responsibility. At the end of the year, 81st S/L Rgt arrived at Clacton to be converted into an LAA regiment.

At Christmas, four new 4-gun 3.7-inch HAA sites with GL Mk II gun-laying radar and a sub-GOR were established at Clacton and Mersea to discourage mine-laying, and two batteries of 71st (Forth) HAA Rgt arrived to man them.

At the beginning of 1942, 121st HAA and 49th LAA Rgts were deployed at Martlesham and sites round the Harwich GDA, including Landguard, Parkeston Quay, Dovercourt and Wrabness, 199 LAA Bty was deployed at Chelmsford and North Weald, together with its satellite station at Stapleford Tawney, and at nearby Lambourne End Camp.

=== Spring 1942 ===
The changes in composition of the brigade during the winter of 1941–42 were as follows:

- 71st (Forth) HAA Rgt – from 11 AA Division January 1942
  - 229, 325 HAA Btys
- 121st HAA Rgt – to 6 AA Bde February 1942
- 48th LAA Rgt – left August 1941; sent overseas in December 1941, arriving in Java where it was captured by the Japanese
- 62nd LAA Rgt – joined August 1941 to relieve 48th LAA Rgt
  - 185 LAA Bty
- 81st LAA Rgt – new unit formed August 1941, joined September 1941; to 5 AA Division January 1942
  - 261, 307 LAA Btys
  - 199 LAA Bty – to 6 AA Bde January 1942
- 298 Independent LAA Bty – From 43rd LAA Rgt, 28 AA Bde, January 1942
- 28 (Essex) S/L Rgt – to 37 AA Bde January 1942
  - 309, 311, 312 S/L/ Btys
  - 438 S/L Bty (joined January 1942)
- 74 (Essex Fortress) S/L Rgt – to 8 AA Division January 1942
  - 310, 335, 469 S/L Btys
- 81st S/L Rgt – joined December 1941 while converting into 131st LAA Rgt, later to 6 AA Bde
  - 482, 509, 545, 555 S/L Btys

=== Disbandment ===
6th AA Division was reorganised in the winter of 1941–42. As a result, 29 AA Brigade was disbanded at Brentwood on 14 February 1942 and the bulk of its responsibilities transferred to 37 AA Bde, the remainder north of The Naze by 6 AA Bde. Brigadier Gourlay returned to the Royal Engineers and served as Chief Engineer of the beaches and lines of communication during the Normandy Campaign.

== Postwar ==
When the TA was reconstituted on 1 January 1947, the East Anglian AA Brigade was reformed, numbered as 55 (East Anglian) AA Brigade. (Note: The TA AA brigades were now numbered 51 and upwards, rather than 26 and upwards as in the 1930s.) It was based at Barking, Essex, and was subordinate to 1 AA Group. (Note: AA Command's corps and divisions had been disbanded in 1942 and a group structure introduced; 1 AA Group controlled the air defences of the London region.) At this time the brigade comprised the following units from Essex:

- 600th (Mobile) HAA Regiment (Essex Regiment) the former 65th Searchlight Regiment, RA (The Essex Regiment)).
- 563rd Searchlight Regiment, RA (28th Essex): see above.
- 517th LAA Regiment, RA (Essex)

However, 55 AA Bde was disbanded the following year, completely disappearing in September 1948.

== External sources ==
- British Army units 1945 on
- British Military History
- Generals of World War II
- Orbat.com
- Orders of Battle at Patriot Files
- Land Forces of Britain, the Empire and Commonwealth (Regiments.org)
- The Royal Artillery 1939–45
- Subterranea Britannica
