= 49th Light Anti-Aircraft Regiment, Royal Artillery =

49th Light Anti-Aircraft Regiment, RA
- Cap badge of the Royal Artillery
- Active: 10 July 1940 – 8 January 1945
- Country: United Kingdom
- Branch: British Army
- Role: Air defence
- Size: Regiment
- Part of: 6th Anti-Aircraft Division; 78th Infantry Division
- Engagements: The Blitz; Operation Torch; Sicily; Italy

The 49th Light Anti-Aircraft Regiment (49th LAA Rgt) was an air defence unit of Britain's Royal Artillery during World War II. After serving with Anti-Aircraft Command during and after the Blitz, it joined 78th 'Battleaxe' Division to take part in the Allied invasion of North Africa (Operation Torch). It then served with the division in Sicily and Italy until it was disbanded at the end of 1944.

== Origin ==
The regiment was formed as part of the rapid expansion of Britain's anti-aircraft (AA) defences during the Battle of Britain. It was assembled on 10 July 1940 around 84 LAA Battery transferred from 44th LAA Rgt. 84 Battery had been formed at Salisbury when the Territorial Army was mobilised in late August 1939. The new regiment was also joined by 90 and 119 LAA Bty headquarters and 513–519 LAA Troops, which had been formed on 1 July 1940 (the troops would have been lettered within the regiment).

At this stage of the war the Bofors 40 mm gun was in short supply, and LAA units had to make do with a range of stop-gap weapons, including 3-inch guns, Vickers Mk VIII pom-poms and 20 mm Hispano cannons, but a large number of LAA sites only had Light machine guns.

== Battle of Britain and Blitz ==
During the summer of 1940, the Luftwaffe heavily attacked RAF Fighter Command's airfields in South-East England. After training 49th LAA Rgt joined AA Command and by the autumn of 1940 it was in 6th AA Brigade defending airfields in Essex under 6th AA Division. After the Battle of Britain the Luftwaffe switched to a night Blitz against Britain's cities, but although many night raids crossed Essex on their way to London, there was little that LAA guns could do against them.

== Mid-War ==
The Blitz ended in May 1941, but occasional raids continued. From late May 90 LAA Bty was attached to 17th LAA Rgt in 37th AA Bde, which controlled the AA units along the north bank of the Thames Estuary ('Thames North'). The other batteries came under 29th (East Anglian) AA Bde and were deployed as follows until late August 1941:

6th AA Division's formation sign.

- Regimental Headquarters (RHQ): Overbury Hall, Hadleigh, Suffolk
- Battery HQ (BHQ), 84 LAA Bty: Wilton Lodge, Melton, near Woodbridge, Suffolk
  - RAF Martlesham Heath – one Troop HQ (THQ) and 6 gunsites with various Bofors and Quad pom-poms
- BHQ 119 LAA Bty: Wolverstone Park, Wolverstone, near Ipswich
  - Landguard Fort – 3 gunsites with Quad pom-poms

On 28 August 119 LAA Bty left Landguard and took over four gunsites round Chelmsford and 84 LAA Bty spread its troops as follows:

- Martlesham Heath
- Landguard
- Wrabness – THQ and 6 Quad sites
- Great Bromley – THQ and 4 Bofors and Quad sites
- Parkeston Quay – THQ and 4 Bofors sites

On 19 September 1941 119 LAA Bty transferred to 81st LAA Rgt, which was being formed at Boxted, Essex. It was replaced by 280 LAA Bty, which had been formed on 12 June by 220th LAA Training Rgt at Yeovil based on a cadre of experienced officers and men supplied by 49th LAA Rgt.

By the beginning of November, the regiment (under the command of Maj H.S. Fookes) had 84 and part of 280 LAA Btys at Martlesham and part of 280 at Landguard. Major Fookes was also deputy AA Defence Commander (AADC) for the Heavy AA (HAA), LAA and searchlights (S/Ls) at Martlesham

From 11 January 1942, 199 and 298 LAA Btys in 29th AA Bde area were attached to 49th LAA Rgt. 199 LAA Battery (manning Chelmsford, RAF North Weald and RAF Stapleford Tawney) had been left when 81st LAA Rgt moved away, while 298 was an independent battery having left 43rd LAA Rgt, which was embarking for service in Ceylon.

On 19 February 1942, 298 LAA Bty was formally regimented with 49th LAA Rgt; at the same time the regiment formed a new 452 LAA Bty from the fourth troops of 84, 90 and 280 LAA Btys. In March, 280 and 298 LAA Btys were attached to 37th AA Bde, which had taken over the coast as far as The Naze when 29th AA Bde was disbanded in February. 298 LAA Battery left to join 133rd LAA Rgt when that was formed in April. Finally, 452 LAA Bty left on 28 April for 86th LAA Rgt. (Note: In a number of regiments the LAA batteries in the 400 series were formed from men deemed unfit for active service overseas.)

49th LAA Regiment remained in 6th AA Bde until early June 1942 when (with 84, 90 and 280 LAA Btys) it transferred to 28th (Thames & Medway) AA Bde, which controlled the 'Thames South' AA layout on the south bank of the Thames Estuary. However, this was only a temporary move and the regiment left AA Command before the end of the month.

== Torch ==
78th Division's insignia, which gave rise to its nickname of 'Battleaxe Division'.

49th LAA Regiment joined 78th Infantry Division on 16 July 1942 and remained with it for the rest of its service. 78th Division was being assembled as an assault formation of First Army for the proposed Allied landings in North Africa (Operation Torch). The 'Torch' convoys left the Clyde in October 1942 and 78th Division aboard the Eastern Task Force sailed through the Straits of Gibraltar to land near the port of Algiers. The first landing craft set off for the beaches at 23.50 on 7 November carrying 11th Brigade Group, including the gunners of 84 LAA Bty landing as infantry. The brigade landed on beaches west of the port without opposition, and during the day the rest of the regiment arrived and began unloading the guns from Landing Craft Mechanized, while 84 LAA Bty set off on foot for Blida Airport, a key objective, which was quickly taken over.

On 9 November, 78th Division began moving eastwards in a series of lightly equipped columns, 36th Bde along the coast while 11th Bde took a parallel but more tortuous route through mountain defiles leading to Béja, Medjez el Bab, and eventually Tunis – the so-called 'Dash for Tunis'. However, the Axis had reacted quickly to the landings: air attacks on the shipping and beaches began at dusk on 8 November, and after covering 300 miles (480 km) 78th Division ran into fierce opposition in the Tebourba hills on 25 November. 49th LAA Regiment, with its batteries scattered over 30 miles (48 km) of territory, was dragged into the ground fighting and 84 LAA Bty, with nearly all its guns, was encircled and captured during an armoured counter-attack. By December the regiment was divided between Béja, Medjez, and the coastal route. It had driven over 400 miles (640 km), had been engaged at Bône and Tabarka, and in a large number of quick deployments along the way. It had already fired 4300 rounds, claimed 20 'kills' and suffered 6 dead, 36 wounded and 121 missing (prisoners). But against stiff opposition and winter weather the division had lost impetus; it would be almost six months before the Allies finally captured Tunis.

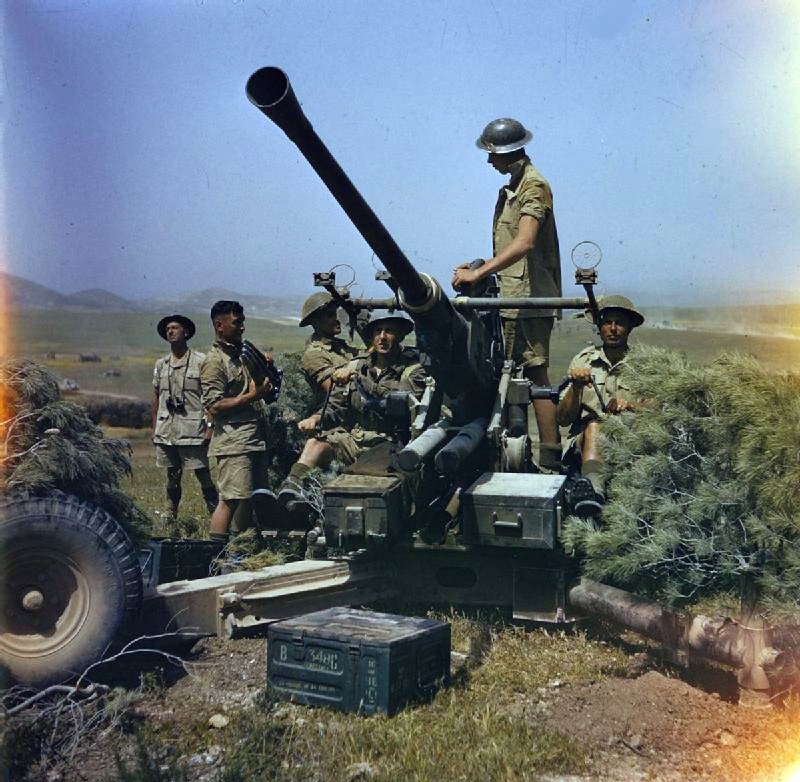
Bofors gun and crew in action near Tunis, May 1943.

As the quantity of AA built up in the forward areas, the Corps Commander, Royal Artillery (CCRA) of V Corps appointed the commanding officer of 49th LAA Rgt, Lt-Col G.V. Hunt, as his deputy AA commander for any setpiece operation. Typically, 49th LAA Rgt allocated one battery to each of 78th Division's field artillery regiments, the three LAA troops being spread across the field gun area in whatever pattern suited the ground, the individual gun sites being chosen by the troop commanders and gun Numbers 1. Moving and deploying AA guns in the rough country with underpowered gun tractors was difficult but necessary as units in the forward areas were subjected to regular dive-bombing and ground attacks. Ammunition expenditure by the LAA batteries was high, often wasted by the inexperienced gunners engaging unsuitable targets at long range, and supply was sometimes erratic. With greater experience of 'snap' actions against fast low-flying aircraft, Bofors gun units increasingly abandoned using the Kerrison Predictor in favour of the simple 'Stiffkey Stick' deflection sight.

Spring 1943 brought an improvement for the Allies. The troop build-up allowed a resumption of the offensive. Attacks by V Corps were backed by 11 AA batteries, with 24 HAA and 96 LAA guns, all coordinated by the 'energetic' Lt-Col Hunt. V Corps was given the task of securing the ground necessary to open the Oued Zarga–Medjez el Bab road, and then moving on to capture Longstop Hill, which had defied the Allies since December. Two weeks of hard slogging followed for 78th Division, during which Junkers Ju 87s and Messerschmitt Bf 109s were active in low-level Strafing and tank-busting missions. During the Oued Zarga battle (7–15 April) 15 were shot down in V Corps' deployment area.

After V Corps had broken the back of the defence, First Army began its final offensive on Tunis (Operation Vulcan) on 22 April, which involved five days' hard fighting across the Medjez Plain before the armour could break through. Axis air attacks were maintained until 25 April, doing considerable damage, but tailed off thereafter. By early May the Axis forces were crumbling, and a final thrust (Operation Strike) took First Army into Tunis on 7 May; the Axis forces surrendered on 13 May. During the campaign all the divisional LAA regiments in the forward areas had been heavily engaged: in the first month 49th LAA Rgt (only 18 guns deployed) scored 20 Category 1 'kills' for 4374 rounds fired, an average of 215 per kill; in the whole campaign it scored 53 'kills' for 35,600 rounds fired, an average of only one kill per 617 rounds fired. The apparent worsening in averages was accounted for by the large number of rounds fired in support of ground actions.

== Sicily ==
After its hard fighting in Tunisia, 78th Division was not employed for the assault phase of the Allied invasion of Sicily (Operation Husky) beginning on 10 July, but was left training at Hammamet. It landed on the Cassibile beaches between 25 and 28 July, completing its concentration south of Scalpello on 30 July, just in time to take part in Eighth Army's advance on Adrano. The division crossed the River Salso on the night of 4/5 August, the River Simeto the following night, and attacked Adrano on the third night. It then continued its advance around the west side of Mount Etna. The Axis began withdrawing from Sicily on 11 August, and the campaign was over by 17 August.

== Italy ==
Eighth Army landed in Calabria in Operation Baytown on 3 September, and advanced up the 'toe' of Italy against light opposition. 78th Division began arriving on 22 September, and was ordered to advance towards Foggia where there was an important airfield complex. Possession of these and other airfields later allowed the Allies to develop complete air superiority over Italy. Beyond Foggia two of 78th Division's brigades made an amphibious landing with a Commando force on 3 October to seize Termoli in Operation Devon. All the division's guns and supporting armour remained south of the River Biferno until the Sappers could construct fords and bridges. The link-up with the hard-pressed amphibious force was achieved on 6 October. 78th Division next forced a bridgehead over the River Trigno on 27 October, but the follow-up operation to capture Vasto was delayed by bad weather. By 9 November the division had reached the River Sangro, and despite the flooding achieved bridgeheads by 22 November. Bridging sites normally required AA defence, but bad weather halted air operations on both sides. The crossings were finally achieved, and on 1 December 78th Division broke into the Bernhardt Line defences beyond. The division was then rested.

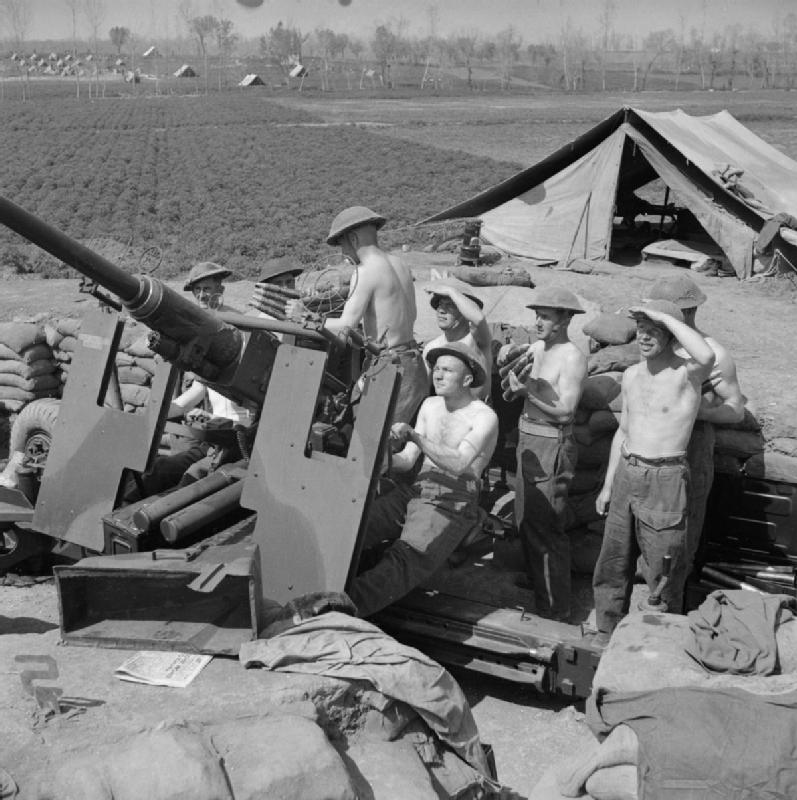
Bofors gun crew in Italy, April 1944

78th Division was in reserve during the winter battles at Monte Cassino, but was then committed during Operation Diadem (the fourth and final Battle of Monte Cassino) on 15 May 1944. The division was ordered to press hard up the Liri Valley to outflank the defenders at Monastery Hill. Advancing along the crowded Highway 6 it reached Roccasecca railway station by 25 May and then moved into the rough country to the north, which was difficult for the supporting guns and vehicles. Once the Hitler Line was broken, 78th Division went into reserve on 3 June while armoured formations passed through for the pursuit to Lake Trasimeno. The division returned to the front on 10 June, advancing up the River Tiber against strengthening opposition before beginning an attack on the Trasimene Line on 21 June. After hard fighting the defences were breached on 28 June.

The gravely weakened Luftwaffe was unable to influence any of these operations. Meanwhile British forces in Italy were suffering an acute manpower shortage. In June 1944 the Chiefs of Staff decided that the number of AA regiments in Italy must be reduced – corps LAA regiments were disbanded and divisional LAA regiments such as 49th LAA Rgt were reduced from 54 to 36 guns – their surplus personnel being converted to other roles, particularly infantry. At the same time the AA guns were finding other uses. LAA troops were included in fireplans for defended localities and Bofors guns were often employed to harass known enemy machine gun and mortar positions out to a range of 1,000 yards (910 m) or more. A concentrated burst of fire at 120 rounds per minute when a machine gun opened fire was usually effective at suppression. Some infantry commanders were keen for Bofors to 'brown' any area from which an attack was anticipated.

Allied Armies in Italy's policy was to rotate exhausted divisions to Egypt for rest and reorganisation. 78th Division accordingly handed over its equipment to 56th (London) Infantry Division and embarked on 18 July 1944. It was in Egypt 23 July–9 September and returned to Italy on 15 September, concentrating around Fano.

On 2 October the division began relieving 88th US Division in the Santerno valley, but the roads were almost impassable to British lorries and gun tractors, and six-wheel-drive trucks had to be borrowed from the Americans to get the division into position, while the infantry had to use mule transport. 78th Division supported the American offensive by driving off a German counter-attack on Monte Battaglia. It then pushed towards Imola and the Via Aemilia, but progress was slow in the winter weather. After the division had taken Monte Spaduro on 23 October the offensive petered out.

== Disbandment ==
By late 1944, the Luftwaffe was suffering from such shortages of pilots, aircraft and fuel that serious air attacks could be discounted. As a result further cuts could be made in AA units to address the British reinforcement crisis. 49th LAA Regiment left 78th Division on 6 November, and together with 84, 90 and 280 LAA Btys was disbanded on 8 January 1945.
