= 303rd Infantry Brigade =

- Active: Formed 22 January 1945
- Country: United Kingdom
- Branch: British Army
- Type: Infantry Brigade
- Role: Lines of Communication

The 303rd Infantry Brigade was a formation of the British Army organised from surplus Royal Artillery (RA) personnel retrained as infantry towards the end of the Second World War.

== Origin ==
By the end of 1944, 21st Army Group was suffering a severe manpower shortage, particularly among the infantry. In January 1945, the War Office began to reorganise surplus anti-aircraft and coastal artillery regiments in the UK into infantry battalions, primarily for line of communication and occupation duties in North West Europe, thereby releasing trained infantry for frontline service. The 303rd brigade was one of seven brigades formed from these new units.

== Composition ==
The 303rd Infantry Brigade was formed on 22 January 1945 by conversion of the Headquarters of 27th (Home Counties) Anti-Aircraft Brigade within the 2nd Anti-Aircraft Group. It was commanded by Brigadier H.G. Smith and comprised the following Territorial Army RA units:

- 632nd (St Pancras) Infantry Regiment Royal Artillery formed by the 33rd (St Pancras) Searchlight Regiment RA (TA). (This had originally been the 19th Battalion, London Regiment (St Pancras) until conversion in 1935.)
- 634th (Middlesex) Infantry Regiment, Royal Artillery formed by 36th (Middlesex) Searchlight Regiment RA (TA)
- 635th (King's Regiment) Infantry Regiment Royal Artillery formed by 38th (The King's Regiment) Searchlight Regiment RA (TA). (This had originally been 6th (Rifle) Battalion of the King's Regiment (Liverpool) until conversion in 1936.)

== Service ==
After infantry training, including a short period attached to the 61st Infantry Division, the 303rd Brigade was sent to Norway in June 1945 following the liberation of that country (Operation Doomsday).

== External sources ==
- British Military History website
- Land Forces of Britain, The Empire and Commonwealth
- The Royal Artillery 1939–45
- Imperial War Museum
