= 133rd Light Anti-Aircraft Regiment, Royal Artillery =

WWII British Army military unit

89th Searchlight Regiment, RA 133rd Light Anti-Aircraft Regiment, RA
- Royal Artillery cap badge
- Active: 4 March 1941 – 23 March 1942 (89th S/L); 23 March 1942 – 6 March 1946 (133rd LAA)
- Country: United Kingdom
- Branch: British Army
- Role: Air Defence
- Size: Regiment
- Engagements: The Blitz; Normandy campaign Defence of Antwerp; Operation Plunder

The 133rd Light Anti-Aircraft Regiment (133rd LAA Regiment), was an air defence unit of Britain's Royal Artillery during World War II. It saw action during the campaign in North West Europe, defending the vital port of Antwerp against V-1 flying bombs and supporting the advance into Germany.

== Origin ==
The regiment was formed in March 1942 from the short-lived 89th Searchlight Regiment, Royal Artillery, which had only been raised in the previous March as part of the rapid expansion of British Anti-Aircraft (AA) defences.

=== 89th Searchlight Regiment ===
89th Searchlight Regiment was formed on 4 March 1941 at Exeter under 60th AA Brigade in 8th AA Division. The four batteries were drawn from different training regiments, each formed around a cadre of experienced men provided by an existing S/L regiment:

- 536th Battery from a cadre of 67th (Welch Regiment) S/L Rgt at 203 S/L Training Rgt at Blandford Camp, with personnel mainly from Newcastle upon Tyne
- 541st Battery from a cadre of 41st (North Staffs) S/L Rgt at 235 S/L Training Rgt at Troon, with personnel mainly from Glasgow
- 542nd Battery from a cadre of 36th (Middlesex) S/L Rgt at 236 S/L Training Rgt at Oswestry, with personnel mainly from London
- 543rd Battery from a cadre of 64th (1/6th Essex) S/L Rgt at 237 S/L Training Rgt at Holywood, Northern Ireland, with personnel mainly from Manchester.

Regimental Headquarters (RHQ) under Lt-Col J.H. Boyd, Royal Engineers, was established at Bolham, Devon, and the batteries were deployed across Devonshire as equipment arrived. The regiment exposed its first S/L beams on the night of 24 April. Thereafter there were frequent alerts as enemy aircraft attacked targets round Exeter and Plymouth during the closing weeks of The Blitz. On 29 June one of 543 Bty's sites received damage from a bomb landing nearby.

Anti-Aircraft Command's searchlights had been deployed in clusters, but in September 1941 this arrangement was changed and 89th S/L Rgt's lights were redeployed singly to form a 'killer belt' to assist Royal Air Force night-fighters. However, in October 1941, 89th S/L Rgt was ordered to redeploy again to provide closely spaced S/L cover within the Plymouth Gun Defence Area (GDA), with RHQ moving to Buckland Filleigh.

In December, orders were received for 543 S/L Bty to leave the regiment and move to Kent (it soon joined 33rd (St Pancras) S/L Rgt), while the rest of 89th S/L Rgt was to be converted to the Light Anti-Aircraft (LAA) gun role. Lt-Col Boyd left to return to the Royal Engineers and was replaced by Lt-Col H.M. Powell, Royal Artillery. The regiment was relieved by 74th (Essex Fortress) S/L Rgt and moved into camp at St Audries, close to the School of AA Instruction at Watchet. RHQ was established at Bicknoller.

=== 133rd Light Anti-Aircraft Regiment ===
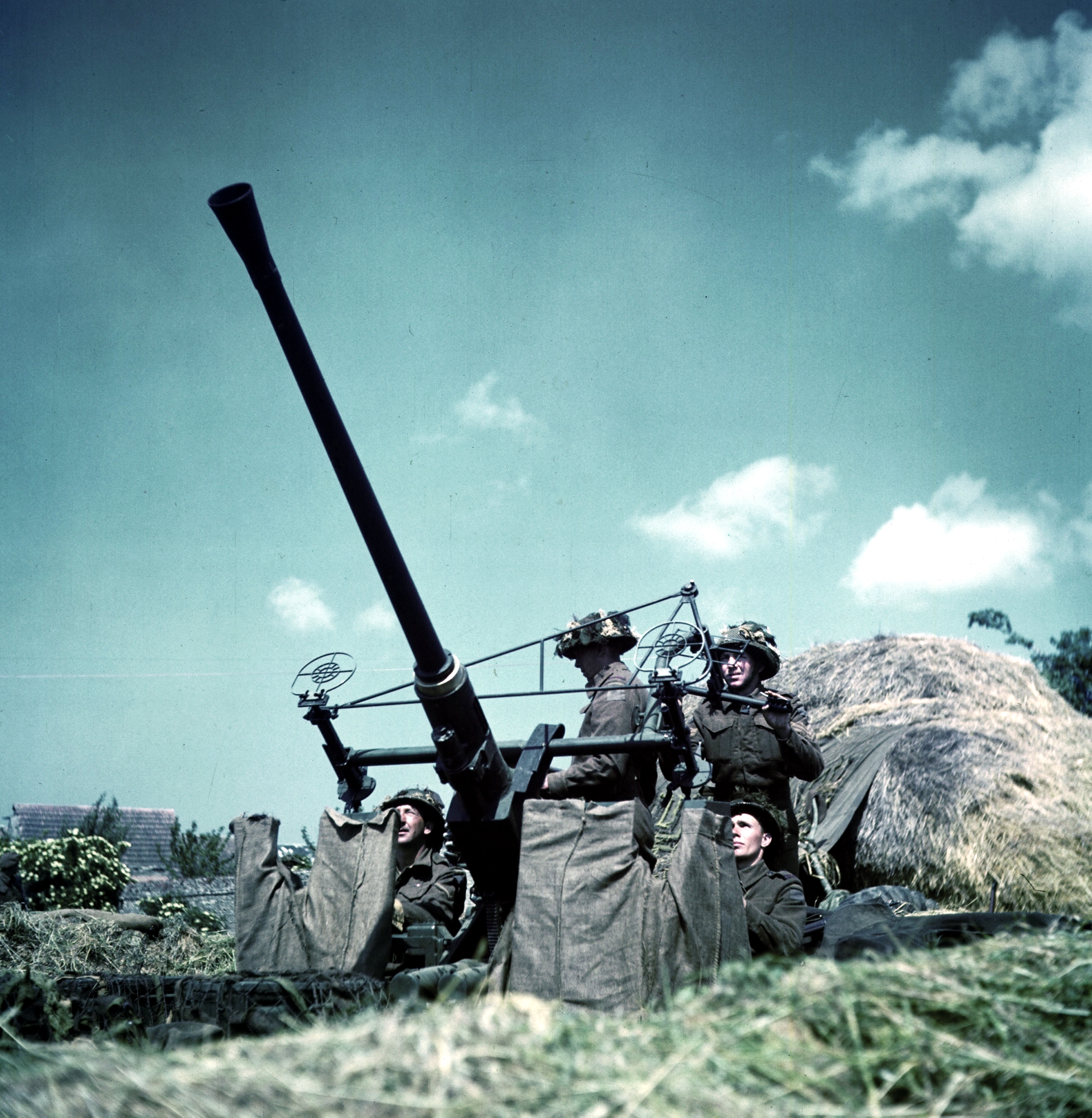
Bofors 40 mm LAA gun equipped with Stiffkey-Stick sights

133rd LAA Regiment was formally established on 23 March 1942, with 536, 541 and 542 S/L Btys becoming 442, 443 and 444 LAA Btys. 442 LAA Battery was retrained at 10th LAA Training Regiment at Deepcut Barracks and the others at 225th LAA Training Rgt at Newquay. A more experienced fourth battery was due to be formed from three separate troops provided by the batteries of 60th LAA Rgt; however, in the end the fourth battery (298) was transferred complete from 49th LAA Rgt on 22 April.

Two more batteries joined over the following months: 475 LAA Bty on 19 May from 86th LAA Rgt and 465 LAA Bty on 10 July from 72nd LAA Rgt, but on the later date 298 and 475 LAA Btys left the regiment, transferred to 83rd LAA Rgt (in the Orkney and Shetland Defences (OSDEF)) and 134th LAA Rgt respectively. Finally, on 3 October 465 LAA Bty also left, for 142nd LAA Rgt, leaving 133rd LAA Rgt with its three original batteries. 133rd LAA Regiment had initially rejoined 60th AA Bde in 8th AA Division, but in June 1942 it moved to 69th AA Brigade, still in 8th AA Division in South West England. By the end of September, RHQ and 444 LAA Btys had moved to 46th AA Brigade covering Bristol, while 442 and 443 LAA Btys remained with 69th AA Bde.

== Overlord ==
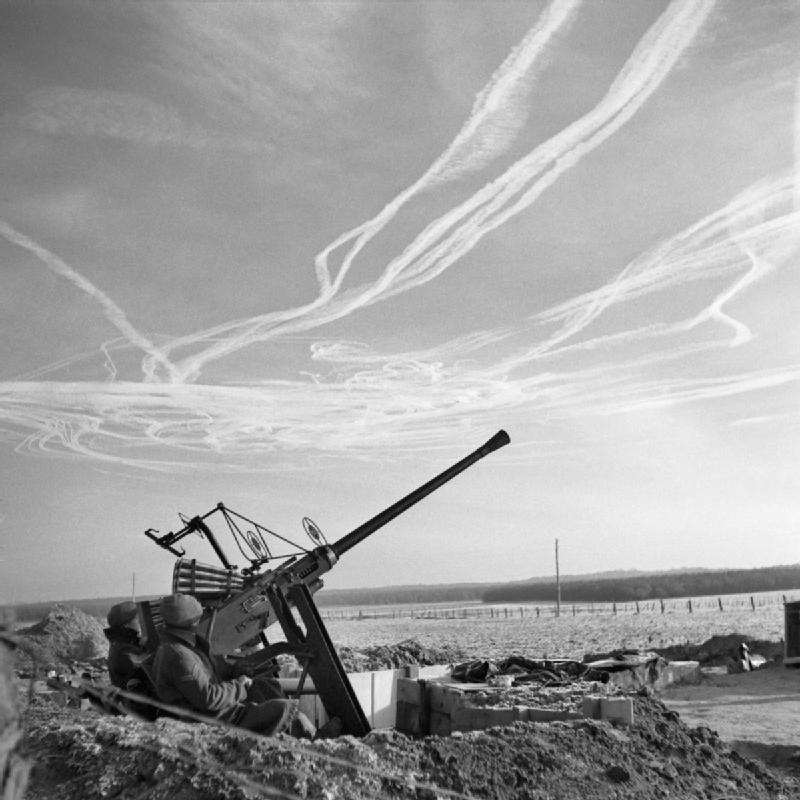
A British Bofors LAA gun, winter 1944–45.

The regiment left AA Command in February–March 1943 and joined 74th AA Brigade under War Office control. 74th AA Brigade was one of the mobile formations created to support 21st Army Group in the Operation Overlord planned invasion of Normandy.

For the next year, 133rd LAA Rgt trained for Overlord with 74th AA Bde. LAA regiments at this time comprised three batteries of three troops, each equipped with six towed Bofors 40 mm guns using Stiffkey Stick sights. As a mobile unit, 133rd would also have had a Royal Electrical And Mechanical Engineers (REME) workshop and a detachment of the Royal Corps of Signals.

74th AA Brigade landed in Normandy in August 1944 to join First Canadian Army. At the end of the month, 21st Army Group broke out from the Normandy beachhead and began to pursue the defeated German troops across Northern France. In the last days of the month, 74th AA Bde's LAA regiments were deployed to guard the crossings of the River Seine.

== Antwerp ==
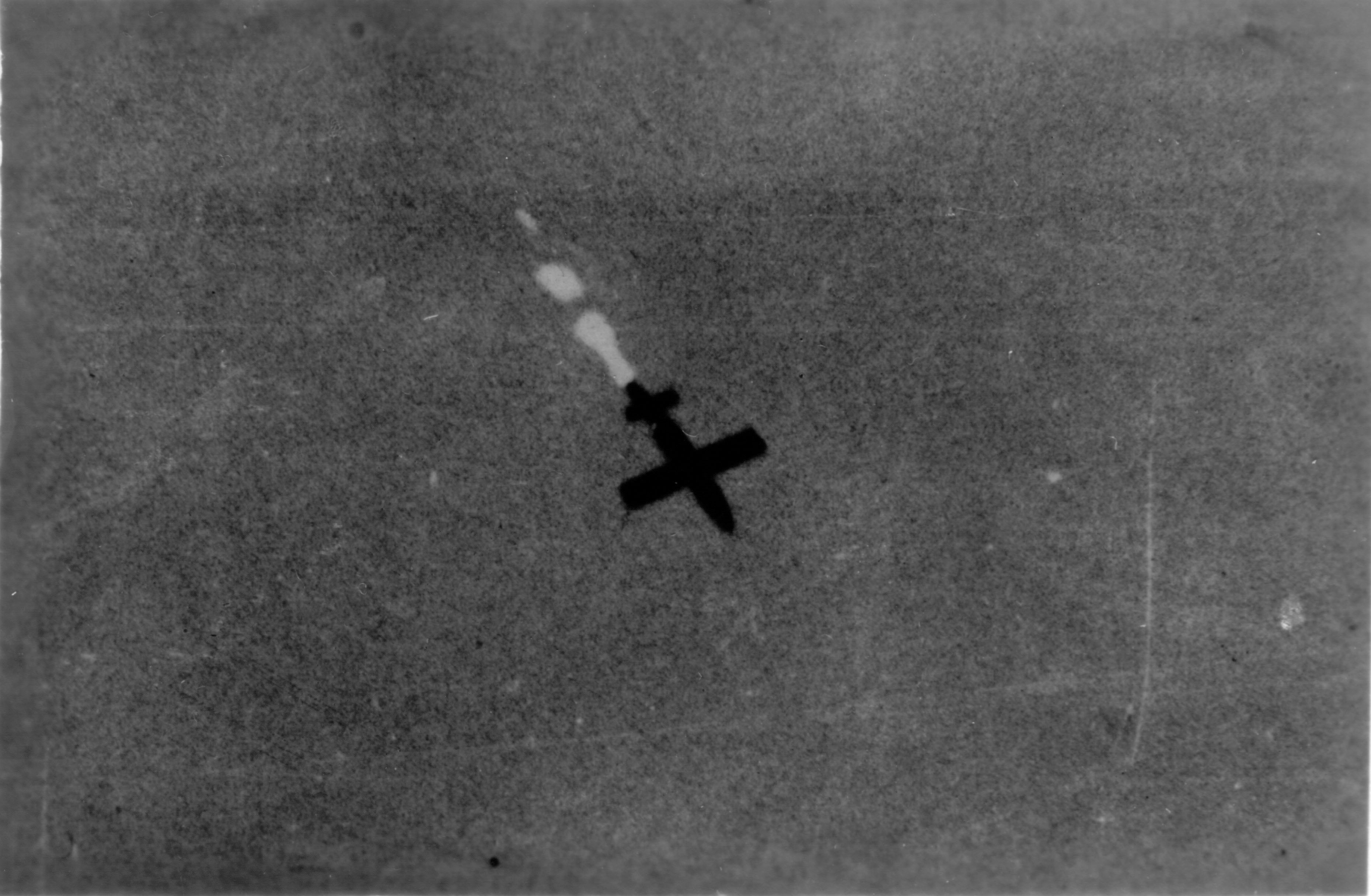
V-1 in flight over Antwerp

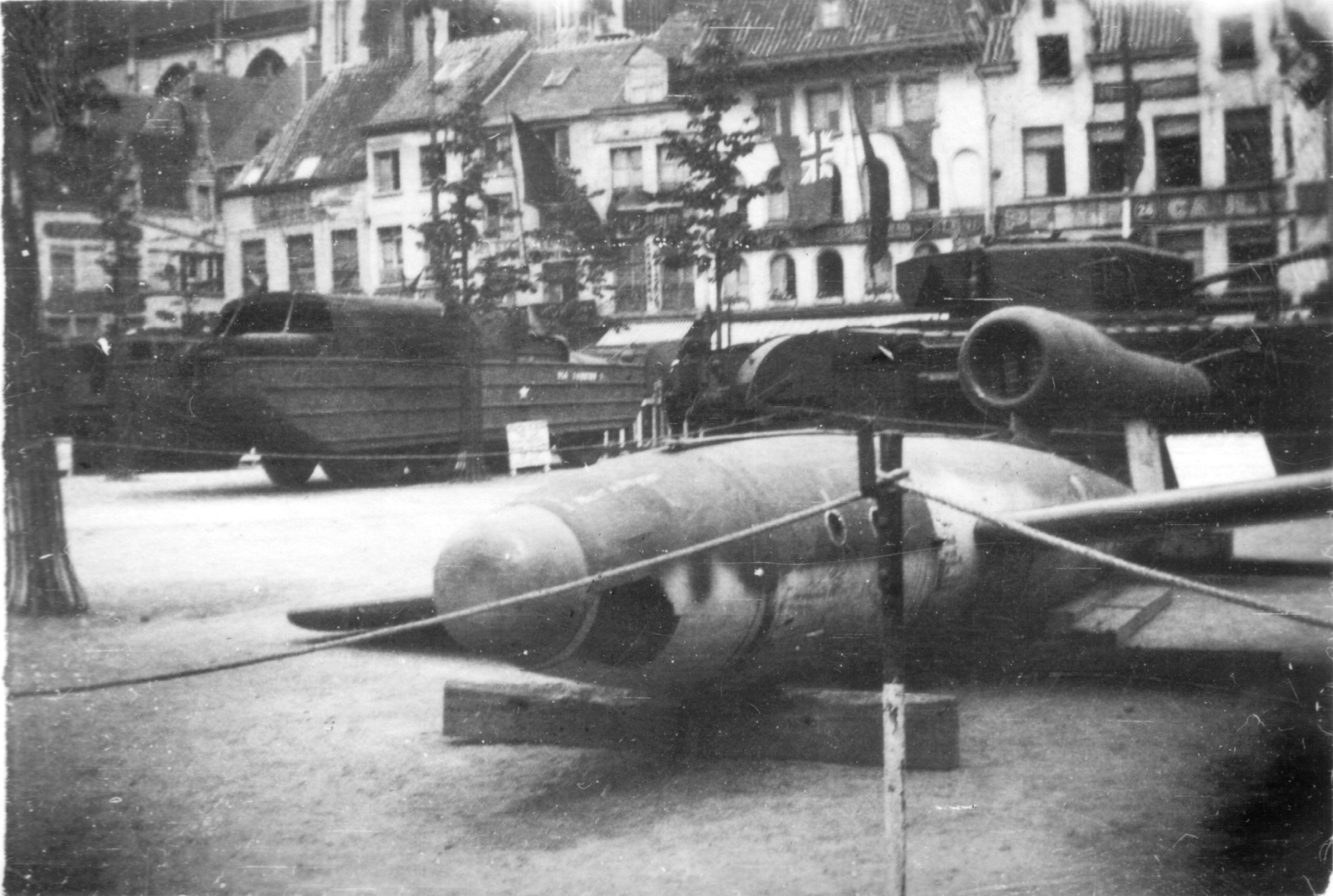
Captured V-1 displayed at Antwerp at the end of World War II.

Clearing the Scheldt Estuary and bringing the port of Antwerp into use as a supply base was an important element in the Overlord plan. The planners envisaged a large GDA to deal not only with conventional air raids but also the threat of V-1 flying bombs (codenamed 'Divers'). On 18 October, 133rd LAA Rgt reinforced 5th Royal Marine AA Bde at Antwerp.

To prevent downed V-1s falling in the city and dock area, the guns had to be positioned at least 10 miles outside the city, integrated into a system of warning stations and observation posts, supported by radar and searchlights. This 'X' defence deployment, including 133rd LAA Rgt, took its full form in December 1944, in time for the peak in V-1 attacks.

== Rhineland ==
By February 1945, 133rd LAA Rgt had rejoined 74th AA Bde with II Canadian Corps for Operation Veritable to clear the Reichswald and break the Siegfried Line. The brigade's role was to protect the vital Waal and Meuse (Dutch: Maas) river crossings immediately behind the front. This role continued during the assault crossing of the Rhine (Operation Plunder) in late March. 74th AA Bde, including 133rd LAA Rgt, remained in support of First Canadian Army until VE Day.

After occupation duties with British Army of the Rhine, RHQ and 442, 443 and 444 LAA Btys were disbanded on 6 March 1946.

== External sources ==
- Royal Artillery 1939–1945
