= 36th (Middlesex) Searchlight Regiment, Royal Artillery =

36th (Middlesex) Anti-Aircraft Battalion, RE 36th (Middlesex) Searchlight Regiment, RA 634th (Middlesex) Infantry Regiment, RA 571 (Middlesex) Searchlight Regiment, RA
- Active: 15 December 1935–1 May 1961
- Country: United Kingdom
- Branch: Territorial Army
- Type: Searchlight Regiment, Infantry Battalion, Anti-Aircraft Regiment
- Role: Air Defence
- Part of: Anti-Aircraft Command
- Garrison/HQ: Hendon; Edgware
- Engagements: The Blitz; Operation Doomsday

The 36th (Middlesex) Searchlight Regiment was a volunteer air defence battalion of Britain's Territorial Army (TA) from 1936 until 1961, at first as part of the Royal Engineers, later in the Royal Artillery. As part of 40th Anti-Aircraft Brigade, it defended air bases in East Anglia through the Battle of Britain and the Blitz. Towards the end of 1944, the unit underwent infantry training, serving briefly in Norway at the end of the war. After the war, the 36th continued as a TA unit, with some women serving with it. In 1961, the remnants of the regiment were amalgamated with others to form a combined infantry battalion, and all links with air defence were severed.

90 cm 'Projector Anti-Aircraft', displayed at Fort Nelson, Portsmouth.

== Origin ==
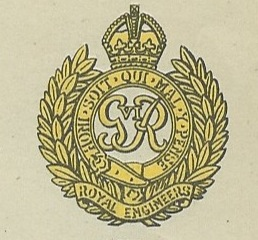
Cap badge of the Royal Engineers (cipher of King George VI).

The regiment had its origins in 317 (Middlesex) Independent Anti-Aircraft Searchlight Company, one of a number of air defence companies of the Royal Engineers formed in the Home counties by the Territorial Army during 1924. 317 AASL Company, based at Hendon, was grouped with two companies from Kent in the Kent & Middlesex Group. John (later Sir John) Perring (1870–1948), a businessman and prominent member of the London County Council and Middlesex Territorial Association, was appointed Honorary Colonel of the Group in 1931.

In October 1935, the Kent & Middlesex Group became 29th (Kent) AA Battalion, RE and, on 15 December 1935, 317 Company was separated and expanded into a full battalion as the 36th (Middlesex) Anti-Aircraft Battalion, Royal Engineers (TA). The battalion raised three new companies, 344 at Harrow, 345 at Edgware and 346 at Southall. It formed part of 29th (East Anglian) Anti-Aircraft Brigade. Major Edward Boggis, MBE, was transferred from 26th (London) Air Defence Brigade Signals, Royal Corps of Signals, to be Officer Commanding 344th AA Company. Sir John Perring was reappointed Honorary Colonel of the new unit.

The TA's AA units were mobilised on 23 September 1938 during the Munich Crisis, with units manning their emergency positions within 24 hours, even though many did not yet have their full complement of men or equipment. The emergency lasted three weeks; they were stood down on 13 October.

On 1 November 1938, 344 AA Company was detached to form the cadre for a duplicate unit, which became 58th (Middlesex) AA Bn, RE, under the command of Lt-Col Boggis, while 36th AA Bn began raising a new 424 AA Company.

== World War II ==
=== Mobilisation ===
Formation sign of 2nd Anti-Aircraft Division.

In February 1939, the existing AA defences came under the control of a new Anti-Aircraft Command. In June, as the international situation worsened, a partial mobilisation of the TA was begun in a process known as 'couverture', whereby each AA unit did a month's tour of duty in rotation to man selected AA gun and searchlight positions. On 24 August, ahead of the declaration of war, AA Command was fully mobilised at its war stations. By the outbreak of war, 36th (Middlesex) AA Bn had moved to Edgware and it formed part of 40th Anti-Aircraft Brigade in 2nd Anti-Aircraft Division. It had the following organisation:

- Battalion HQ (Edgware)
- 317 AA Company (Edgware)
- 345 AA Company (Edgware)
- 346 AA Company (Southall)
- 424 AA Company (forming)

=== 36th (Middlesex) S/L Regiment, RA ===
Cap Badge of the Royal Artillery (pre-1953).

In common with other RE searchlight battalions, the unit was transferred to the Royal Artillery on 1 August 1940, becoming 36th (Middlesex) Searchlight Regiment RA (TA), and the companies were termed batteries. At this time, AA Command was heavily engaged in the Battle of Britain, in which 40th AA Bde was responsible for guarding airfields in East Anglia. This was soon followed by the night-bombing campaign of The Blitz, in which searchlights were a key element in the defences.

In November 1940, AA Command changed its S/L layouts to clusters of three lights to improve illumination, but this meant that the clusters had to be spaced 10,400 yards (9,500 m) apart. The cluster system was an attempt to improve the chances of picking up enemy bombers and keeping them illuminated for engagement by AA guns or Royal Air Force (RAF) Night fighters. Eventually, one light in each cluster was to be equipped with Searchlight Control radar (SLC) and act as 'master light', but the radar equipment was still in short supply.

In early 1941, 36 S/L Rgt sent a cadre of experienced men to 236 S/L Training Rgt at Oswestry, where they formed 542nd S/L Bty with recruits mainly from London. This battery then formed part of 89th S/L Rgt, which was later converted into 133rd Light AA Rgt, and fought in the North West Europe campaign.

=== Mid-War ===
36th (Middlesex) S/L Regiment remained in 40th AA Brigade in 2nd AA Division (later 5th AA Group) for much of the war. In September 1943 it transferred within 5th AA Group to 50th AA Brigade. 50th AA Brigade HQ was then transferred to 21st Army Group preparing for the Allied invasion of Normandy (Operation Overlord); 36th S/L Rgt remained in AA Command and came under 27th (Home Counties) AA Brigade from January 1944.

With the lower threat of attack by the weakened Luftwaffe, AA Command was being forced to release manpower for Overlord, and all Home Defence searchlight regiments were reduced by a battery. 424 S/L Battery commenced disbandment on 7 February 1944, completing by 28 February. Then, on 18 March, E Troop of 346 S/L Bty left to become D Trp of 332 S/L Bty in 33rd (St Pancras) S/L Rgt.

=== 634th (Middlesex) Regiment, RA ===
By the end of 1944, however, the Luftwaffe was suffering from such shortages of pilots, aircraft and fuel that serious aerial attacks on the United Kingdom could be discounted. At the same time, 21st Army Group fighting in North West Europe was suffering a severe manpower shortage, particularly among the infantry. In January 1945, the War Office began to reorganise surplus anti-aircraft and coastal artillery regiments in the UK into infantry battalions, primarily for line of communication and occupation duties, thereby releasing trained infantry for frontline service. 27th (Home Counties) AA Brigade was one of the HQs selected for conversion, becoming 303rd Infantry Brigade on 22 January 1945. Within the brigade, 36th S/L Rgt was redesignated 634th (Middlesex) Infantry Regiment RA.

After infantry training, including a short period attached to 61st Infantry Division, 634 Regiment was sent to Norway in June 1945 following the liberation of that country (Operation Doomsday). On 15 October 1945, the regiment began passing into suspended animation, completing the process by 12 November.

== Postwar ==
=== 571st LAA/SL Regiment ===
When the TA was reconstituted on 1 January 1947, the regiment was reformed as 571st Searchlight Regiment RA (Middlesex) at Edgware. It formed part of 82nd AA Brigade at Ealing. Two years later, it was redesignated 571st (Mixed) Light Anti-Aircraft/Searchlight Regiment (Middlesex), ('Mixed' indicating that it was composed partly of women of the Women's Royal Army Corps).

=== Amalgamation ===
On 10 March 1955, Anti-Aircraft Command was disbanded, and many of its TA regiments were disbanded or reduced. 571st was amalgamated with two other LAA/SL regiments in NW London – 595th (9th Battalion, Middlesex Regiment) and 604th (Royal Fusiliers) – to form a new regiment: 571st Light Anti-Aircraft Regiment, RA, (9th Battalion, The Middlesex Regiment, Duke of Cambridge's Own), (Note: The only RA unit with its own Queens and Regimental colour. New colours were presented on Horse Guards in 1960.) in which the old 571st formed 'P' Battery. The new unit was in 33 AA Brigade

Finally, on 1 May 1961, the 571st (9th Middlesex) was amalgamated with the 7th and 8th battalions of the Middlesex Regiment to form a combined infantry battalion, (5th Bn) and all links with air defence and the Royal Artillery were severed.

== Honorary Colonels ==
The following officers served as Honorary Colonel of the unit:

- Sir John Perring, see above, was Hon Col successively of the Kent & Middlesex AA Group, 36 AA Bn, and 36 S/L Rgt.
- Lieutenant-General Sir Maurice Grove-White, former General Officer Commanding of 2 AA Corps, was Hon Col of 571 S/L Rgt until 4 September 1950.

== External sources ==
- British Army units from 1945 on
- British Military History
- Orders of Battle at Patriot Files
- Land Forces of Britain, the Empire and Commonwealth (Regiments.org)
- The Royal Artillery 1939–45
- Graham Watson, The Territorial Army 1947
