= Essex Fortress Royal Engineers =

British coast and air defence unit (1908–1955)

Essex Fortress Royal Engineers 74th (Essex Fortess) Searchlight Regiment 609 Heavy Anti-Aircraft Regiment
- Active: 1908–10 March 1955
- Country: United Kingdom
- Branch: Territorial Army
- Role: Coast Defence; Air defence
- Garrison/HQ: Chelmsford; Tottenham
- Engagements: Battle of Britain; The Blitz; North West Europe

The Essex (Fortress) Royal Engineers was a volunteer unit of Britain's Royal Engineers formed to defend the Essex coast. It served in this role in World War I and then converted to a searchlight regiment for air defence in World War II. The unit ended the war as a garrison infantry battalion. Its descendants continued to serve in the Territorial Army until 1955.

== Precursor unit ==
The enthusiasm for the Volunteer movement following an invasion scare in 1859 saw the creation of many Rifle, Artillery and Engineer Volunteer units composed of part-time soldiers eager to supplement the Regular British Army in time of need. One such unit was the 1st Essex Engineer Volunteer Corps formed at Heybridge, Maldon, in December 1861, under the command of Edward Hammond Bentall, proprietor of a firm of agricultural engineers in the town. Two other members of his family featured among the list of officers. A small unit, it was attached to the larger 1st Middlesex EVC in 1863, and was disbanded in 1871. There were no other engineer volunteers in the county of Essex for over 30 years.

== Territorial Force ==
When the Territorial Force (TF) was created by the Haldane Reforms in 1908, a new unit was formed at Chelmsford under the title Essex (Fortress) Royal Engineers. Its nucleus came from personnel of the former Electrical Engineers Volunteer Corps, of which there had been a Detachment raised from the Crompton Electrical Works in Chelmsford, under the leadership of its managing director, R. E. B. Crompton. The Essex Fortress RE consisted of a single Company, No.1 Essex Electric Lights Company, RE (TF), which had its headquarters at Bank Chambers, New Street, Chelmsford. In 1909, it moved to 19 Broomfield Road, Chelmsford, and finally in 1911 to the newly opened Drill Hall in Market Road, Chelmsford, which it shared with the Essex Royal Horse Artillery, 5th Battalion Essex Regiment and other local TF units.

== World War I ==
On the outbreak of World War I, the fortress engineers were mobilised and the Essex company moved into its war station in the Harwich Coast Defences. A second Company was formed as a Reserve unit in October 1914, comprising men from the pre-war Company who had not signed to undertake "Imperial Service" overseas if required, and the original Company was brought up to strength with new recruits. In January 1915 the Companies were retitled as 1/1st Essex (Fortress) Company (Electric Lights), RE (TF) and 2/1st Essex (Fortress) Company (Electric Lights), RE (TF); as it transpired neither unit served overseas and both remained on home service at Harwich, providing searchlights for the Eastern Coast Fixed Defences at Harwich Redoubt and Landguard Fort, Felixstowe. In October 1918, coastal defence units in the U.K. were extensively reorganised and the two Essex (Fortress) Electric Lights Companies amalgamated to form 601st (Harwich) Fortress Company, RE (TF). As well as searchlight detachments, the Company included a Fortress Signal Section, providing the communications for the various defences around the Port.

As well as operating searchlights for the coastal defence guns, the RE fortress companies began to use them in the Anti-Aircraft (AA) role as the war progressed and raids by airships and fixed wing bombers on the East Coast became more frequent. As a naval base, Harwich was a tempting target and, although the town was darkened, German aircrews could still recognise it from harbour lights and the outline of the power station and railway. By mid-1917, Harwich AA Defence Command (AADC) was allocated No 9 Mobile Searchlight Company, RE (manned by the Tyne Electrical Engineers and as the system became more sophisticated in 1918 the RE searchlight detachments were assigned directly to AA gun batteries of the Royal Garrison Artillery, and Harwich AADC had No 8 AA Battery, forming part of the London Air Defence Area. In addition, drafts of personnel from the Essex (Fortress) RE were formed into two other units in late 1916, No.43 (Essex) Anti-Aircraft Company, RE (TF), which served at Harwich, and No.44 (Essex) Anti-Aircraft Company, RE (TF), which served on anti-aircraft duties at the Royal Naval Air Station at Pulham Market in Norfolk. Both these units were disbanded in December 1917 upon the reorganisation of anti-aircraft defences in the U.K.

To provide a Headquarters and Depot for the various units, The Essex (Fortress) RE (TF) Administrative Centre had opened at the Market Road Drill Hall, Chelmsford in September 1915. New recruits were processed through this centre, which also acted as a holding Depot, with a small staff of Officers and N.C.Os. In August 1916, the Administrative Centre was merged into No.3 Territorial Force Depot, Eastern Command, which remained at Market Road but in late 1917 the Essex (F) RE portion of this Depot were transferred to a new Royal Engineers (Territorial Force) Depot, opened at Gillingham as a base for all RE (TF) units.

By this stage of the war, most of the men of medical category A1 had been withdrawn from the coastal and AA defences to be sent to join the British Expeditionary Force on the Western Front Thus many men of the Essex (Fortress) RE (TF) found themselves posted to other Royal Engineers units. All TF units were demobilised in 1919 after the Armistice with Germany.

== Interwar ==
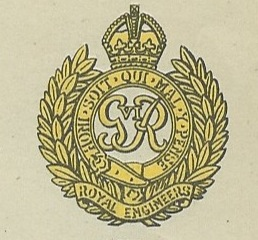
Cap badge of the Royal Engineers (cipher of King George VI)

The Essex (Fortress) Royal Engineers (TF) was reconstituted along with the rest of the Territorial Force in February 1920, and once again consisted of a single Company, to be now known as No 1 Essex Company (Electric Lights and Works), RE (TF), raised at Market Road, Chelmsford. It was attached to 54th (East Anglian) Division (TF) in peacetime, but its wartime role remained as part of the Harwich defences. The Company included both searchlight (Electric Lights) Sections and a Works Section, the latter to build and maintain the defences. In addition, the Harwich (Fortress) Signal Section, RE (TF) was to be formed, to provide and maintain the telephone and wireless communications for the Harwich Defences. This latter Section transferred to the Royal Corps of Signals in August 1920 and ceased to form part of the Essex (Fortress) RE.

In October 1921, the Territorial Force was renamed as The Territorial Army and the Essex (Fortress) RE changed its title to No.1 (Essex) Electric Lights Company, RE (TA), relinquishing the Works role. Whilst retaining its headquarters at Chelmsford, a section was opened at the Drill Hall, Brooke Road, Grays in 1923, which recruited from the Grays and Wickford districts. During the 1930s, the increasing need for AA defences was recognised, and the Essex Fortress Engineers company was assigned a new anti-aircraft role for the Port of Harwich, being redesignated as No.1 (Essex) Anti-Aircraft Searchlight Company, RE (TA) in 1932. Its place in the Harwich coast defences was taken in 1936 by a newly formed unit, the Suffolk (Fortress) RE (TA), which raised an Electric Lights and Works Company at Ipswich.

90 cm Projector Anti-Aircraft, displayed at Fort Nelson, Portsmouth

After the Munich Crisis, Britain's AA defences were rapidly expanded as part of the TA's new Anti-Aircraft Command and by May 1939 the Essex Fortress Engineers had been incorporated into a new unit designated 74th (Essex Fortress) Anti-Aircraft Battalion, RE, organised as:

- HQ at a new drill hall at Tottenham High Road
- 310 (Essex) AA Company at Epping – transferred from 28th (Essex) AA Bn
- 335 AA Company at Tottenham – transferred from 33rd (St Pancras) AA Bn
- 469 AA Company at Market Road, Chelmsford, less two Sections raised at the Drill Hall, Fairfield Road, Braintree, the Grays Sections having transferred in late 1938 to 2/6th Battalion, The Essex Regiment (65th Searchlight Regiment) (TA) – former 1 AA Company, Essex Fortress Engineers

== World War II ==
=== Mobilisation ===
In June 1939, as the international situation worsened, a partial mobilisation of the TA was begun in a process known as 'couverture', whereby each AA unit did a month's tour of duty in rotation to man selected AA gun and searchlight positions. On 24 August, ahead of the declaration of war, AA Command was fully mobilised at its war stations. 74th AA Battalion established its HQ at Springfield House, Hatfield Peverel. The unit was subordinated to 29th (East Anglian) Anti-Aircraft Brigade in 6th Anti-Aircraft Division, which was responsible for the air defence of the Thames Estuary, Essex and north Kent.

=== Phoney War ===
In the spring of 1940, 6th AA Division reorganised its growing AA defences. As a result, 29 AA Brigade took on responsibility from 37 AA Bde for the Gun Defence Area (GDA) at Harwich and Royal Air Force (RAF) airfields including North Weald and Debden.

In May, the first, very secret, Searchlight Control (SLC) radar sets began to appear, with one being stationed at Landguard Fort to replace the old sound-locator at the S/L site operated by 469 AA Co.

=== Battle of Britain ===
Cap badge of the Royal Artillery (pre-1953.

The Phoney War ended with the German invasion of France and the Low Countries on 10 May 1940. Home Forces became concerned about the threat from German paratroopers and AA Command's units were given anti-invasion roles. A plan to attach groups of riflemen from the infantry training centres to 6 AA Division's widely spaced S/L sites foundered on the lack of men. Instead, the S/L detachments themselves were given the responsibility for attacking parachutists before they could organise, and spare men at company HQs were formed into mobile columns using requisitioned civilian transport to hunt them down. 74th AA Battalion drew extra rifles and ammunition from Warley Ordnance Store.

On 1 August 1940, the RE's AA battalions were transferred to the Royal Artillery (RA), which designated them Searchlight Regiments, and the companies became batteries.

During the Battle of Britain, the subsequent London Blitz, on into 1941, the regiment remained part of 29 AA Bde covering Harwich and East Anglia. Its searchlights had a dual role in assisting both the guns of AA Command and the night fighters of RAF Fighter Command.

=== The Blitz ===
Formation sign of 6 Anti-Aircraft Division, worn until December 1941.

The S/L layouts had been based on a spacing of 3500 yards, but due to equipment shortages this had been extended to 6000 yards by the time the Luftwaffe began its night Blitz in September 1940. In November, this was changed to clusters of three lights to improve illumination, but this meant that the clusters had to be spaced 10,400 yards apart. The cluster system was an attempt to improve the chances of picking up enemy bombers and keeping them illuminated for engagement by AA guns or RAF Night fighters. Eventually, one light in each cluster was to be equipped with searchlight control (SLC) radar and act as 'master light', but the radar equipment was still in short supply. 73rd S/L Regiment served in 29 AA Bde in East Anglia throughout the Blitz.

The regiment supplied a cadre of experienced officers and men to 236th S/L Training Rgt at Oswestry where it provided the basis for a new 559 S/L Bty formed on 13 February 1941. This battery later joined 66th (Gloucesters) S/L Rgt.

=== Mid-war ===
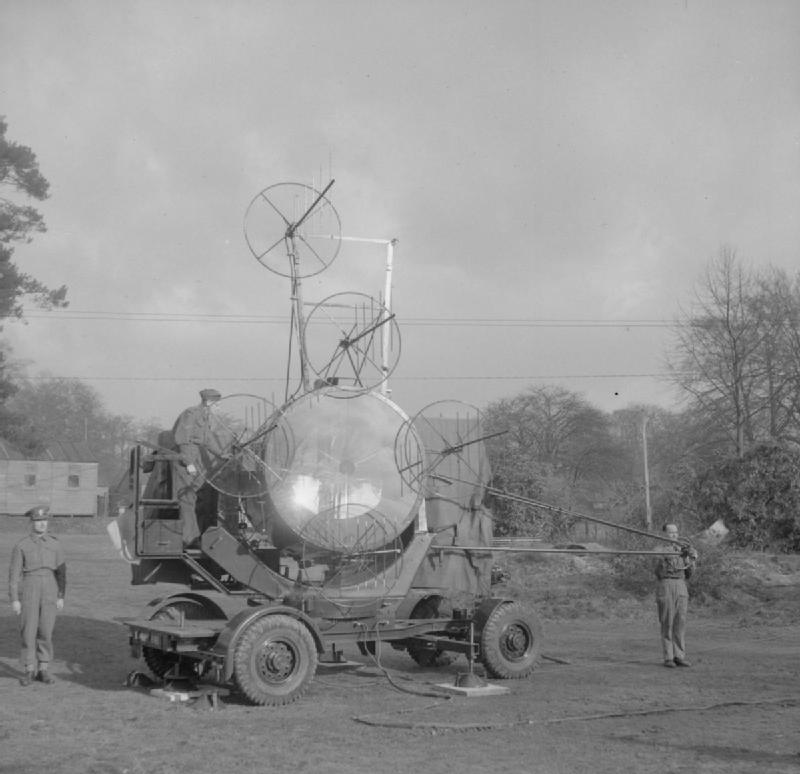
150 cm Searchlight with SLC AA Radar No 2.

By October 1941, the availability of SLC radar was sufficient to allow AA Command's S/Ls to be 'declustered' into single-light sites spaced at 10,400-yard intervals in 'Indicator Belts' along the coast and 'Killer Belts' at 6000-yard spacing inland to cooperate with night fighters.

Formation sign of 8 Anti-Aircraft Division, worn until October 1942.

During December 1941, the regiment moved to 60 AA Bde in 8 AA Division covering Exeter, Yeovil and Portland Harbour.

Early in 1942, the Luftwaffe began a new wave of attacks on British cities (the Baedeker Blitz):in 8 AA Division's area Exeter and undefended Bath were hit in March, April and May, and Weston-super-Mare in June.

The main threat along the South Coast of England during the summer of 1942 was from low level daylight 'hit and run' raids by single-engined Luftwaffe aircraft, which were difficult for AA guns to engage but provided targets of opportunity for the Light machine guns with which S/L sites were equipped.

There was a shake-up of AA Command at the beginning of October 1942, when the AA Divisions were replaced by AA Groups having a wider remit. 60 AA Brigade and 74th S/L Rgt came under 3 AA Group.

=== Infantry role ===
By the end of 1944, 21st Army Group fighting in North West Europe was suffering a severe manpower shortage, particularly among the infantry. At the same time, the German Luftwaffe was suffering from such shortages of pilots, aircraft and fuel that serious aerial attacks on the United Kingdom could be discounted. The War Office began to reorganise surplus AA regiments in the UK into infantry battalions, primarily for line of communication and occupation duties, thereby releasing trained infantry for front-line service.

74th (Essex Fortress) was one of the searchlight regiments selected for conversion, reorganising in the infantry role as 74th (Essex Fortress) Garrison Regiment, RA on 9 November 1944 (with the 'Essex Fortress' subtitle being authorised on 21 December). It was redesignated again on 12 February 1945, this time as 613rd (Essex Fortress) Infantry Regiment, RA and joined 21st Army Group on line of communication duties in April 1945.

== Postwar ==
When the TA was reconstituted on 1 January 1947, the 74th Searchlight Regiment was reformed at Tottenham as 609 (Mixed) Heavy Anti-Aircraft Regiment, RA (Tottenham), equipped with anti-aircraft guns. ('Mixed' indicating that it was composed partly of members of the Women's Royal Army Corps). The regiment formed part of the short-lived 52 AA Brigade, based at Chingford, Essex.

Simultaneously, the former 469 Searchlight Battery at Chelmsford, the direct descendant of the Essex Fortress Engineers, was reformed as 855th Anti-Aircraft Fire Command Battery, RA (Essex Fortress). This was initially assigned to 98th Army Group RA (TA), an anti-aircraft formation formed for service with the Middle East Land Forces in time of war, but the AGRA disbanded in late 1948 and 855 AA C&R Bty became a unit of 1st Anti-Aircraft Group, Anti-Aircraft Command in peacetime, though in the event of war it was still destined for service in the Middle East as part of 78 AGRA (AA) (TA). In 1953, the battery was authorised to adopt a supplementary arm title with the wording ESSEX FORTRESS in red on navy blue worn below the RA shoulder title.

After AA Command was abolished on 10 March 1955, 609 (Tottenham) HAA Rgt was disbanded by 1 July, and since no role could be found for 855 Bty, it was also disbanded on 1 August, thus ending the active life of the Essex (Fortress) RE.

Four years later, on 1 April 1959, a new 855 Bty appeared in the TA order of battle, as 855th Anti-Aircraft Reporting Battery, RA (TA). This, however, was not a descendant of the original 855, but was raised at Salford near Manchester by amalgamating existing independent AA Reporting Troops in the area. (Some previously published sources have erroneously attributed the new Bty to Chelmsford and the Essex (F) RE, however this is incorrect). In May 1961, the Battery was disbanded again, when the technically trained personnel went to 470 (3rd West Lancashire) Light Air Defence Regt, RA (TA) and the remainder to 287 (1st West Lancashire) Medium Regt, RA (TA).

== Museum ==
Essex (Fortress) RE is one of the units covered by the Essex Regiment Museum at Chelmsford.

== External sources ==
- British Army units from 1945 on
- Mark Conrad, The British Army in 1914.
- British Military History
- The Drill Hall Project.
- Grace's Guide to British Industrial History
- The Long, Long Trail
- Orders of Battle at Patriot Files
- Army Museums Ogilby Trust
- Graham Watson, The Territorial Army 1947.
