= 27th (Home Counties) Anti-Aircraft Brigade =

27th (Home Counties) AA Brigade 53 (Home Counties) AA Brigade
- Active: 1922–1945; 1947–1948
- Country: United Kingdom
- Branch: Territorial Army
- Type: Anti-Aircraft Brigade
- Role: Air Defence
- Part of: 1st AA Division (1935–39); 6th AA Division (1939–40); 5th AA Division (1940–42); 2 AA Group (1944–45); 1 AA Group (1947–48)
- Engagements: The Blitz; Baby Blitz; Operation Diver

27th (Home Counties) Anti-Aircraft Brigade (27 AA Bde) was an Air Defence formation of the British Army in the Second World War that served in The Blitz and later converted to infantry.

== Origin ==
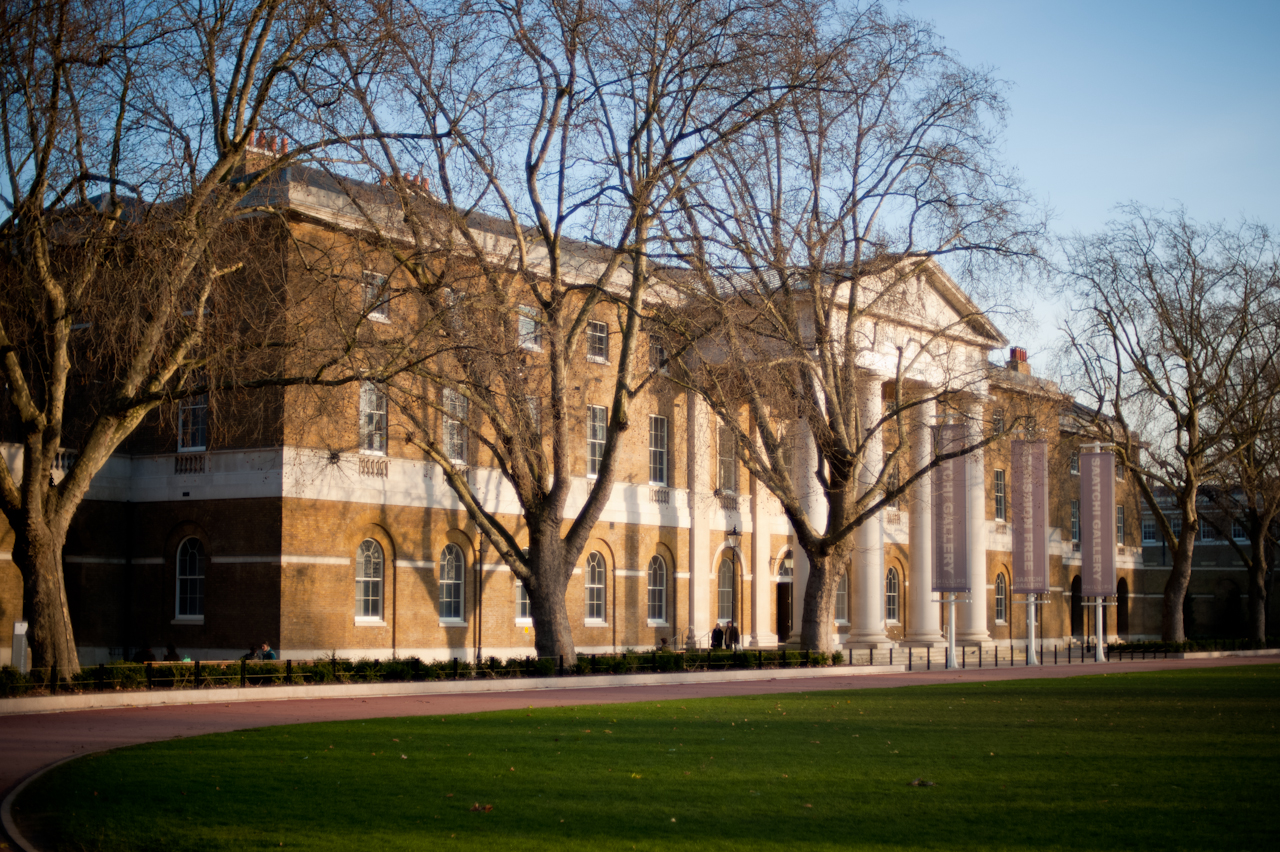
The former Duke of York's Headquarters in Chelsea, London

German air raids by Zeppelin airships and Gotha bombers on London and other British cities during the First World War had shown the need for strong anti-aircraft (AA) defences in any future war. When the Territorial Army (TA) was reformed in 1922 it included a number of dedicated AA units of the Royal Artillery (RA) and Royal Engineers (RE). Two formations were organised in London District to command these units, provisionally known as the 2nd and 3rd London Air Defence Brigades, but soon numbered 26th and 27th.

Both brigades were based at the Duke of York's Headquarters in Chelsea. 3rd AD Bde's units were initially based at Lytton Grove, Putney, taking over buildings previously used by the City of London Yeomanry (Rough Riders).

The 27th (London) Air Defence Brigade comprised:

- 53rd (City of London) Anti-Aircraft Brigade, RA (TA) (HAA unit formed in 1922 at Putney, recruited mainly from men in banks and insurance companies in the City of London)
  - HQ at White City, London
  - 157th (City of London) AA Battery at White City
  - 158th (City of London) AA Battery at White City
  - 159th (Lloyd's) (City of London) AA Battery at White City
- 54th (City of London) Anti-Aircraft Brigade, RA (TA) (HAA unit formed in 1922 at Putney)
  - HQ at Putney
  - 160th (City of London) AA Battery at Putney
  - 161st (City of London) AA Battery at Putney
  - 162nd (City of London) AA Battery at Putney
- 27th (London) Anti-Aircraft Battalion (London Electrical Engineers), RE (TA) (a searchlight unit)
  - HQ at Streatham
  - 304th AA Company at Westminster
  - 305th AA Company at Westminster
  - 306th AA Company at Westminster
  - 390th AA Company at Westminster
- 27th (London) Anti-Aircraft Signal Company, Royal Signals

== 1935 Reorganisation ==
As Britain's AA defences expanded during the 1930s, higher formations became necessary. 1st AA Division was formed at the end of 1935 to cover London and the Home Counties. As part of this reorganisation, 26th (London) Bde assumed command of all the gun and searchlight units of the two former brigades, while the 27th was reformed as 27th (Home Counties) Anti-Aircraft Group, based at RAF Kenley, to command new AA units in the South London suburbs.

- 60th (City of London) Anti-Aircraft Brigade, RA, (TA) (heavy anti-aircraft (HAA) gun unit formed in 1935 by conversion of 4th (City of London) Battalion, London Regiment)
  - HQ at Catford
  - 168 Battery at Catford
  - 169 Battery at Catford
  - 194 Battery at Catford
- 30th (Surrey) Anti-Aircraft Battalion, RE, (TA) (formed in 1935 from HQ Surrey Group AA Searchlight Companies RE)
  - HQ at Kingston upon Thames
  - 315 Company at Croydon
  - 316 Company at Kingston upon Thames
  - 318 Company at Guildford
  - 323 Company at Ewell
- 31st (City of London Rifles) Anti-Aircraft Battalion, RE (TA) (searchlight unit formed in 1935 by conversion of 6th Battalion, the London Regiment (City of London Rifles))
  - HQ at Sutton
  - 324 Company at Sutton
  - 325 Company at Sutton
  - 326 Company at Merton
  - 327 Company at Hackbridge
- 34th (The Queen's Own Royal West Kent) Anti-Aircraft Battalion, RE (TA) (searchlight unit formed in 1935 by conversion of 20th London Regiment (Blackheath & Woolwich), affiliated to the Queen's Own Royal West Kent Regiment)
  - HQ at Blackheath
  - 320 Company at Greenwich
  - 336 Company at Blackheath
  - 337 Company at Blackheath
  - 338 Company at Eltham
- 35th (First Surrey Rifles) Anti-Aircraft Battalion, RE (TA) (searchlight unit formed in 1935 by conversion of 21st Battalion, London Regiment, affiliated to the East Surrey Regiment)
  - HQ at Camberwell
  - 340th Company at Camberwell
  - 341st Company at Camberwell
  - 342nd Company at Camberwell
  - 343rd Company at Camberwell

The AA Groups took the more usual formation title of Brigades on 1 January 1939 after the Royal Artillery replaced its traditional unit designation 'Brigade' by the modern 'Regiment'.

== Outbreak of war ==
During the period of tension leading to the Munich crisis and eventually the outbreak of the Second World War, the Territorial Army grew enormously, and existing TA infantry battalions continued to be converted to AA regiments. The number of divisions and brigades was expanded, and the whole AA defence of the United Kingdom was taken over by Anti-Aircraft Command on 1 April 1939. When the UK declared war on 3 September 1939, 27th (Home Counties) AA Bde was a searchlight formation in 6 AA Division (also based at Uxbridge) and had the following composition:

- Brigade HQ: Lingfield, Surrey
- 31st (City of London Rifles) Anti-Aircraft Battalion, RE (TA)
  - HQ, 324, 325, 326, 327 Companies as before
- 34th (The Queen's Own Royal West Kent) Anti-Aircraft Battalion, RE (TA)
  - HQ, 302, 336, 337, 338 Companies as before
- 70th (Sussex) Searchlight Regiment, Royal Artillery (a newly formed TA Unit)
  - HQ, 459, 460, 461 Batteries all at Brighton

In August 1940, during the Battle of Britain, the RE 'Anti-Aircraft' (searchlight) battalions became regiments of the RA.

== The Blitz ==
By late 1940, at the height of The Blitz, 27 AA Bde was serving in 5 AA Division covering the important naval base of Portsmouth, with the following regiments under command:

- 31st (City of London Rifles) Searchlight Regiment, RA (TA)
- 70th (Sussex) Searchlight Regiment, RA (TA)

The AA Corps and Divisions were disbanded and replaced on 1 October 1942 by new AA Groups. Late in 1944, 27 AA Bde was serving in 2 AA Group, covering the Solent, South-East England and southern East Anglia.

== Mid-war ==
Over the two years following the end of the Blitz, the brigade had the following changes in composition:

- 31st S/L Rgt (converted into 123rd Light Anti-Aircraft (LAA) Rgt February 1942; left August 1942)
  - 324, 325, 326, 327 S/L Btys (converted into 405, 408, 409 LAA Btys)
- 34th S/L Rgt
  - 302, 336, 337, 338 Btys
- 23rd LAA Rgt (attached to 65 AA Bde; joined May, left June 1941)
  - 73, 74, 130, 229 Btys
- 43rd LAA Rgt (joined and left June 1941)
  - 147, 148, 198 Btys
- 35th S/L Rgt (rejoined Summer 1941, left December 1941)
  - 340, 341, 342, 343 Btys
- 124th HAA Rgt (joined Autumn 1941, left October-November 1942)
  - 219, 410, 412, 415 Btys
- 1st S/L Rgt (Regular regiment, joined January 1942)
  - 1, 2, 7 Btys
  - 8 Bty (attached to 71 AA Bde October–November 1942)
- 132nd LAA Rgt (converted from 85th S/L Rgt March 1942, joined by May 1942, left June 1942)
  - 436, 437, 438, 441 Btys
- 107th HAA Rgt (joined and left June 1942)
  - 334, 335, 337, 390 Btys
- 68th LAA Rgt (joined August 1942, left October-November 1942)
  - 203, 278 Btys
  - 204 Bty (attached to 47 AA Bde)
- 98th LAA Rgt(joined August 1942)
  - 304 Bty (attached to 47 AA Bde)
  - 305, 306, 481 Btys
- 146th HAA Rgt (joined September 1942; left November 1942)
  - 176, 359, 414, 465 Btys
- 179th (Mixed) HAA Rgt (new regiment joined October-November 1942; left November 1942)
  - 564 Bty (attached to 47 AA Bde)
  - 584, 606 Btys
- 4th (Ulster) LAA Rgt (converted from 3rd (Ulster) S/L Rgt; joined October-November 1942; left November 1942)
  - 7, 8, 10 Bty
- 112th (Durham Light Infantry) LAA Rgt (converted from 47th (DLI) S/L Rgt; joined October-November 1942; left November 1942)
  - 364, 365, 366 Btys
- 125th (Cameronian) LAA Rgt (converted from 56th (Cameronian) S/L Rgt; joined December 1942)
  - 417, 418, 419 Btys

Increasingly, HAA and support units were 'Mixed', indicating that the operational personnel included women of the Auxiliary Territorial Service (ATS).

== Hit and run ==
The AA defences of Southern England were severely tested in the summer of 1942 by the Luftwaffe's 'hit-and-run' attacks along the South Coast, and there was much reorganisation, accounting for some of the turnover of units listed earlier. In August 1942, 27 AA Bde was transferred from 5th AA Division to 3rd AA Division, a HQ brought down from Scotland to handle the increased workload. However, all the AA Divisions were disbanded on 30 September. 27 AA Brigade joined the new 2 AA Group covering South East England, and took responsibility for S/L units in that area. After this major reorganisation in October–December 1942, the brigade settled down with the following composition:

- 125th LAA Rgt
  - 417, 418, 419 Btys
- 1st S/L Rgt
  - 1, 2, 7 Btys
  - 8 Bty (attached to 71 AA Bde)
- 34th S/L Rgt
  - 302, 337, 338 Btys
  - 336 Bty (attached to 47 AA Bde)

However, in the spring of 1943, 125th LAA left 27 AA Bde, later joining 76 AA Bde, one of the formations earmarked for the planned invasion of Normandy (Operation Overlord). It was briefly replaced in 27 AA Bde by the return of 4th LAA Rgt, but that unit left permanently in May. After that, 27 AA Bde once again became purely a S/L formation.

In February, the brigade was strengthened to deal with renewed 'hit-and-run' attacks by Luftwaffe fighter-bombers attacking coastal towns at low level in daylight. 73rd (Kent Fortress) S/L Rgt joined from 56 AA Bde, where it had been covering airfields in Kent, and 355 S/L Bty was detached from 39th (Lancashire Fusiliers) S/L Rgt in 53 AA Bde in North West England, and travelled by train to join 27 AA Bde on the South Coast.

Because of the hit-and-run raids, the allocation of Lewis guns for local defence was increased from one to four and later six per S/L site. The guns had to be manned throughout the hours of daylight. On 11 March a raid on Hastings by Focke-Wulf Fw 190s and Messerschmitt Bf 109s flew right over 355's Battery HQ, and a raid by Bf 109s on Ashford on 24 March was engaged by one of 355's sites. However, in May 1943, 355 S/L battery was disbanded, the ATS personnel and specialists being posted to other units in 27 AA Bde, the remainder being drafted as reinforcements to LAA units.

In April, 73rd S/L Rgt was exchanged for 33rd (St Pancras) S/L Rgt from 66 AA Bde in East Anglia, which took over four areas of Kent under Biggin Hill Sector of No. 11 Group RAF. This area was under regular attack by Luftwaffe fighter-bombers, and the defensive armament of S/L positions was increased, with the existing Lewis guns being supplemented with twin Vickers K machine gun mountings and later twin 0.5-inch Browning machine guns on power mountings.

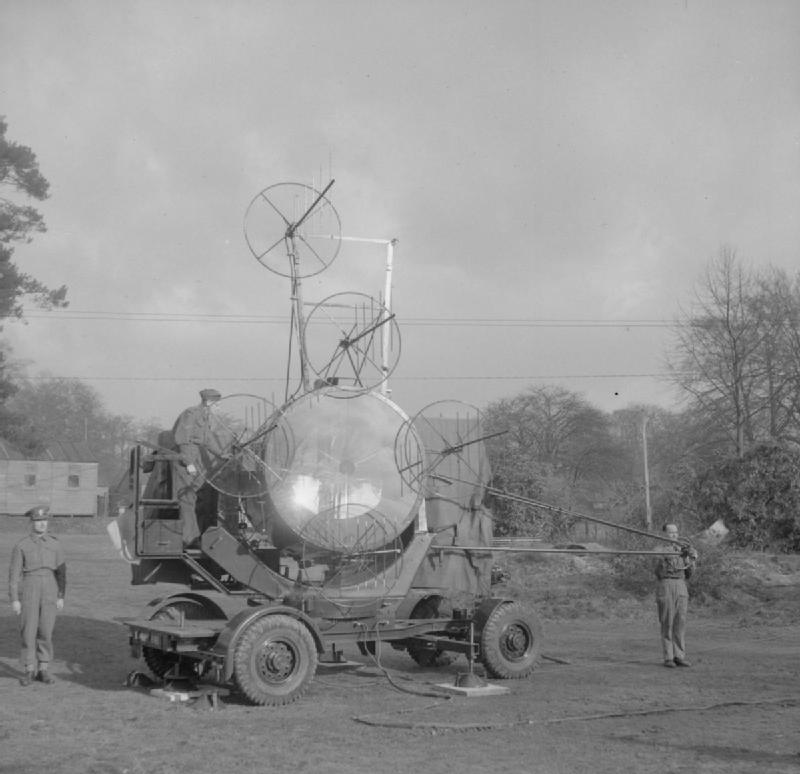
150 cm Searchlight with AA Radar No 2 SLC

By the summer of 1943 the brigade had the following composition:

- 1st S/L Rgt
  - 1, 2, 7, 8 Btys
- 33rd S/L Rgt
  - 332, 333, 334, 543 Btys
- 34th S/L Rgt
  - 302, 336, 337, 338 Btys
- 83rd S/L Rgt joined between 1 Aug and 7 Sep
  - 365, 513, 514, 515 Btys

From September 1943, 33rd S/L Rgt carried out experiments for AA Command on new combinations of S/Ls and searchlight control radar (SLC).

== Baby Blitz and Operation Diver ==
By the end of January 1944, 27 AA Bde had been reinforced by further S/L regiments:

- 36th (Middlesex) S/L Rgt
  - 317, 345, 346, 424 Btys
- 38th (The Kings Regiment) S/L Rgt
  - 350, 351, 352, 353 Btys
- 61st (South Lancashire Regiment) S/L Rgt
  - 432, 433, 434 Btys

Between 21 January and 14 March 1944 the Luftwaffe carried out 11 night raids on London in the so-called 'Baby Blitz'. However, by March 1944, AA Command was being forced to release manpower for Operation Overlord. Each of 27 AA Bde's S/L regiments lost one of its four batteries, leaving:

- 1st S/L Rgt
  - 1, 2, 7 Btys
- 33rd S/L Rgt
  - 332, 333 334 Btys
- 34th S/L Rgt
  - 302, 336, 337 Btys
- 36th S/L Rgt
  - 317, 345, 346 Btys
- 38th S/L Rgt
  - 350, 351, 352 Btys
- 61st S/L Rgt
  - 432, 433, 434 Btys
- 79th S/L Rgt
  - 502, 503, 504 Btys
- 83rd S/L Rgt
  - 365, 513, 514 Btys

In May and June 1944, while the build-up for Overlord was at its height, 38th and 61st S/L Rgts were transferred to 38 AA Bde in 2 AA Group (covering the Thames Estuary), but they returned a month later.

In July 1944 came the start of the V-1 flying bomb campaign against London, though Kent was on the fringe of the V-1's route. 27 AA Bde's S/L layout was little affected by the massive reorganisation that AA Command had to carry out to meet this threat (Operation Diver). However, as 21st Army Group overran the V-1 launching sites, the Luftwaffe began to launch them from aircraft over the North Sea. AA Command shifted units from Kent to deal with them, and in November 33rd S/L Rgt had to take over some of the vacated sites along the East Kent coast. By mid-October, 79th and 83rd S/L Rgts had been transferred to 56 AA Bde in 2 AA Group, and both regiments were disbanded shortly afterwards.

By October 1944, the brigade's HQ establishment was 9 officers, 8 male other ranks and 23 members of the ATS, together with a small number of attached drivers, cooks and mess orderlies (male and female). In addition, the brigade had a Mixed Signal Office Section of 1 officer, 5 male other ranks and 19 ATS, which was formally part of the Group signal unit.

== Conversion ==
By the end of 1944, 21st Army Group was suffering a severe manpower shortage, particularly among the infantry. At the same time the Luftwaffe was suffering from such shortages of pilots, aircraft and fuel that serious aerial attacks on the United Kingdom could be discounted. In January 1945 the War Office began to reorganise surplus anti-aircraft and coastal artillery regiments in the UK into infantry battalions, primarily for line of communication and occupation duties in North West Europe, thereby releasing trained infantry for frontline service.

61st S/L Regiment had already left the brigade in December and been converted into a Garrison regiment, while in mid-Jan 45, 1st S/L had joined 21st Army Group to defend Antwerp and the Scheldt Estuary.

On 22 January 1945, HQ 27 AA Bde under Brigadier H.G. Smith was converted into 303rd Infantry Brigade with the following units under command:

- 33rd S/L Rgt became 632nd (St Pancras) Infantry Regiment, Royal Artillery
- 36th S/L Rgt became 634th (Middlesex) Infantry Regiment, Royal Artillery
- 38thS/L Rgt became 635th (King's Regiment) Infantry Regiment, RA

After initial infantry training, 303 Bde was sent to Norway in June 1945 as part of the liberation of that country (Operation Doomsday).

== Postwar ==
When the TA was reformed on 1 January 1947, 27 AA Bde was reformed at Dover under the new designation of 53 (Home Counties) AA Brigade, with the following composition:

- 259 (Home Counties) (Cinque Ports) HAA Regt
- 489 (Cinque Ports) HAA Regt
- 516 LAA Regt

However, the brigade was disbanded in September 1948.

== External sources ==
- British Military History
- British Army units from 1945 on
- Imperial War Museum
- Land Forces of Britain, the Empire, and Commonwealth
- Sir Frederick Pile, "The Anti-Aircraft Defence Of The United Kingdom From 28th July, 1939, to 15th April, 1945" London Gazette 16 October 1947.
- Orders of Battle
- Patriot Files
- Land Forces of Britain, the Empire and Commonwealth (Regiments.org) (archive site)
- Royal Artillery 1939–1945
