= 88th Heavy Anti-Aircraft Regiment, Royal Artillery =

88th Heavy Anti-Aircraft Regiment, Royal Artillery (TA) 488th Heavy Anti-Aircraft Regiment, Royal Artillery (TA)
- Cap Badge of the Royal Artillery (pre-1953)
- Active: 1 April 1939–15 July 1950
- Country: United Kingdom
- Branch: Territorial Army
- Role: Air Defence
- Size: Regiment
- Garrison/HQ: White City, London
- Engagements: The Blitz; North African Campaign; Italian Campaign

88th Heavy Anti-Aircraft Regiment, Royal Artillery (TA) was a volunteer air defence unit of Britain's Territorial Army (TA) from 1939 until amalgamated in 1950. During World War II it defended South Wales and the Severn Valley during the Blitz and then took part in the North African and Italian campaigns, fighting in both the anti-aircraft (AA) and ground fire roles.

== Origin ==
In the late 1930s the need for improved anti-aircraft (AA) defences for Britain's cities became apparent, and when the Territorial Army (TA) was doubled in size after the Munich Crisis a crash programme of raising new Royal Artillery (TA) units for Anti-Aircraft Command was begun. 88th Anti-Aircraft Regiment was formed on 1 April 1939 and consisted of Regiment Headquarters (RHQ) and 281st, 282nd and 283rd AA Batteries, based at City House, South Africa Road, White City, London. The first officers appointed to the new unit were transferred from 53rd and 54th (City of London) AA Rgts; 53rd (CoL) AA Rgt was also based at White City.

== World War II ==
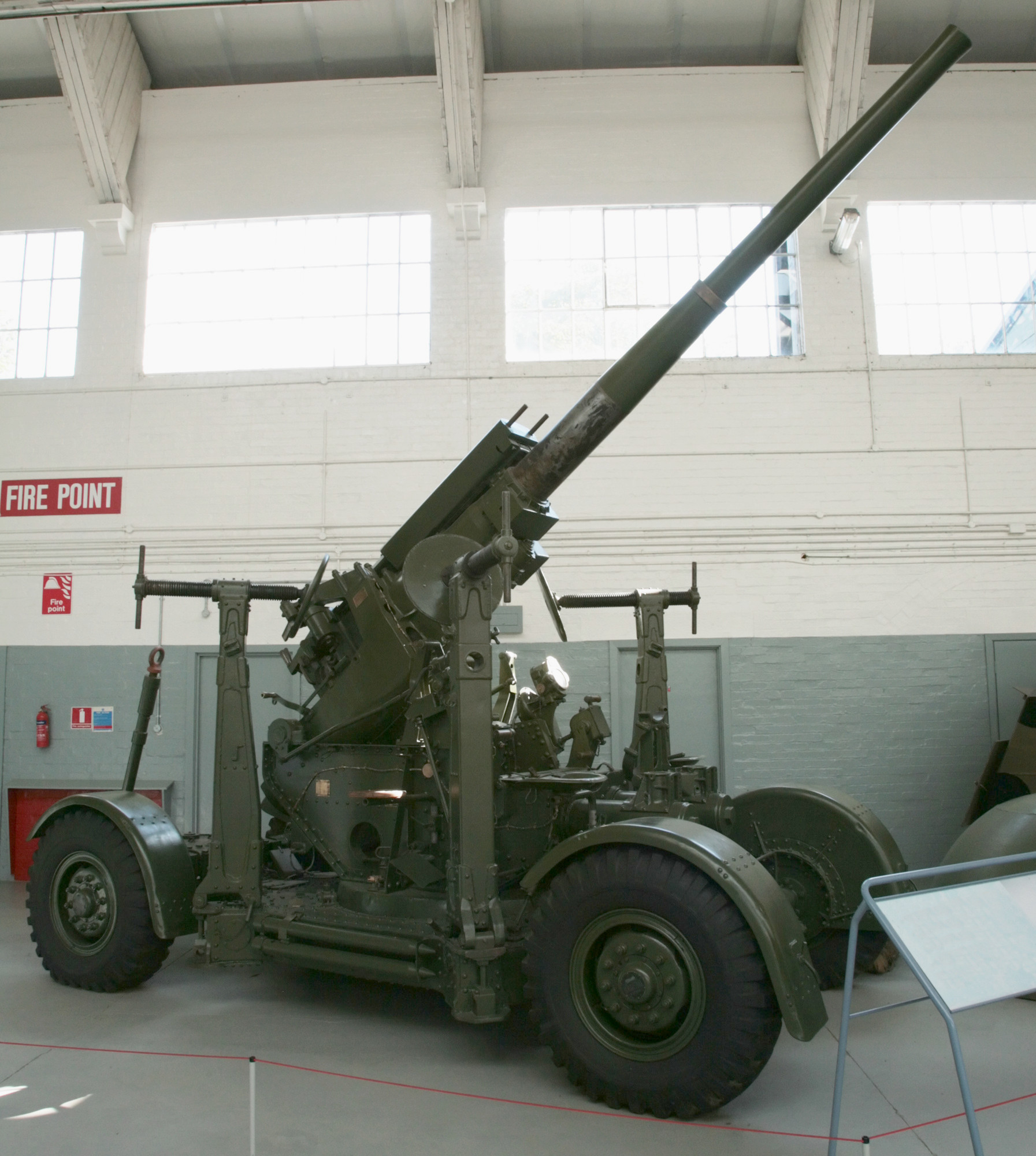
Mobile 3.7-inch HAA gun preserved at Imperial War Museum Duxford.

=== Mobilisation ===
In June 1939 a partial mobilisation of TA units was begun in a process known as 'couverture', whereby each AA unit did a month's tour of duty in rotation to man selected AA gun positions. On 24 August, ahead of the declaration of war, AA Command was fully mobilised at its war stations. On the outbreak of war the new 88th AA Rgt formed part of 26th (London) AA Brigade in 1st AA Division.

=== Blitz ===
On 1 June 1940 those AA regiments equipped with 3-inch or the newer 3.7-inch guns were termed Heavy Anti-Aircraft (HAA) to distinguish them from the new Light Anti-Aircraft (LAA) units being formed. The Royal Artillery's historian suggests that 88th AA Rgt was still being equipped with 3.7-inch guns in London during the summer of 1940. In July the regiment was assigned to 5 AA Brigade, which was being reformed after the Dunkirk Evacuation and taking over responsibility for the defence of the Gloucester area under 5 AA Division. However, 283 HAA Bty took up positions at Newport, Wales, where it came under the operational command of 45 AA Bde. In November, 5 AA Division was split, and 5 and 45 AA Bdes transferred to a new 9 AA Division.

9 AA Division's formation sign

After a few moves, 283 HAA Bty with its eight 3.7-inch guns was stationed at Pye Corner, Newport, (Site F) by the end of August. At the beginning of September four of these mobile guns were moved to Christchurch, Newport, (Site E), and by the end of the month the battery was manning Site E and eight 3.7-inch guns (four mobile and four static) at Nash, Newport, (Site N). Site E had a Gun-laying Mk I radar. During November the four mobile guns from Site N were moved to Boverton (Site I), where another GL radar set was installed. Site N was then handed over to 220 HAA Bty of 85th HAA Rgt, reducing 283 HAA Bty's manning commitment to the normal eight guns.

There were almost nightly nuisance air raids over South Wales and the Severn Estuary during the Battle of Britain, with some engagements for the guns, but when the Luftwaffe turned to night bombing of Britain's cities (The Blitz) in the autumn of 1940 the intensity of these raids increased, with the industrial towns of South Wales coming in for particular attention. Luftwaffe aircraft attempted to lay Parachute mines in the harbours and in the Bristol Channel. The Bristol Aeroplane Company at Filton and the Gloster Aircraft Company at Hucclecote were particularly valuable targets in the area and suffered repeated attacks. Heavy raids also passed over the area on the way to other targets, such as Liverpool, Manchester, and the notorious Coventry raid on 14 November, which was engaged by the Newport guns. Bristol suffered major raids from November to April 1941, Cardiff during January 1941, and Swansea was heavily bombed on the nights of 19/20 and 20/21 February 1941.

Before the Blitz was over, 88th HAA Rgt was rostered for overseas service, and it joined the War Office Reserve in April 1941.

=== North Africa ===
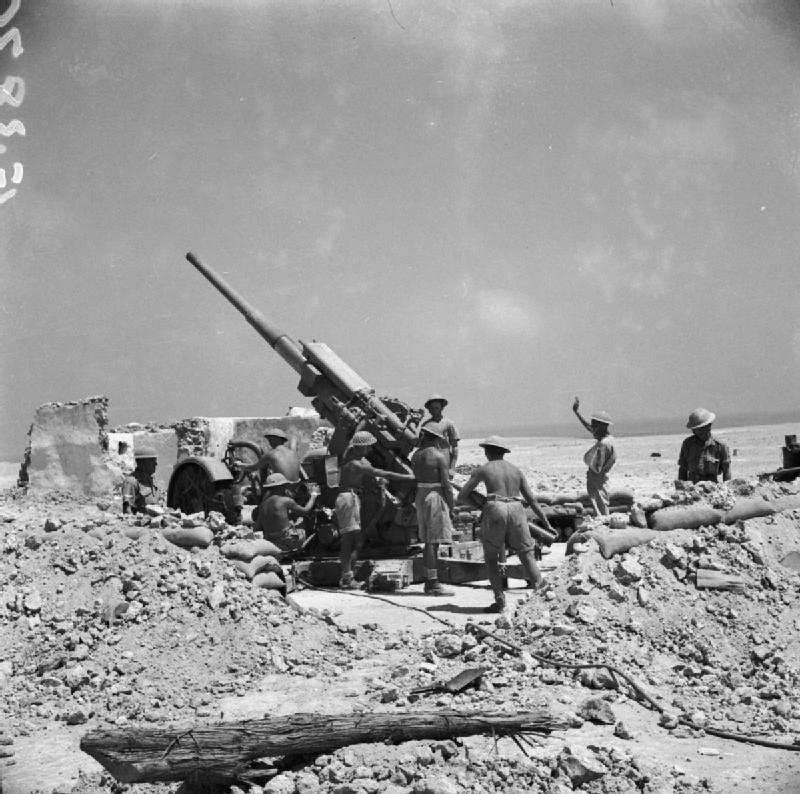
A 3.7-inch HAA gun in the Western Desert, 1941.

The regiment landed at Port Tewfik in Egypt on 23 July 1941 under the command of Lieutenant-Colonel T. Gregory, MC. It joined 2 AA Bde under British Troops in Egypt, responsible for defending the port of Alexandria and the Suez Canal, which had come under increasing air attack during the previous month. By the autumn the regiment was deployed in the Suez and Shallufa area, with 283 HAA Bty detached to Alexandria. However, in October the regiment was switched to 12 AA Bde, which was tasked with defending the landing-grounds of the Desert Air Force in preparation for Eighth Army's new offensive in the Western Desert (Operation Crusader). The first phase of that operation began in November. Over succeeding weeks 88th HAA Rgt cooperated with 27th LAA Rgt, and 107th LAA Bty of that regiment armed with Bofors 40 mm guns was attached to 88th HAA during that period.

The first phase of 'Crusader' lasted until January 1942, when General Erwin Rommel counter-attacked. Eighth Army fell back to the Gazala Line, which consisted of a chain of defensive 'boxes' On 22 May 1942, 107 LAA Bty left 88th HAA Rgt and moved to join 4 AA Bde in Tobruk, where it was captured the following month, together with 282 HAA Bty.

The Battle of Gazala began on 26 May, and Rommel's Axis forces quickly broke into the British position. As 12 AA Bde fell back from the advanced landing grounds in a series of defensive deployments, its guns joined the garrisons of the boxes. When Gambut was given up, eight 3.7-inch guns of 88th HAA Rgt joined 29th Indian Infantry Brigade in the garrison of El Adem. Although the box was isolated by Axis troops, it held out, with the HAA guns in two-gun detachments engaging tanks, vehicles and guns at close range with High explosive, Armour-piercing and Shrapnel shells. Eventually, Eighth Army was forced to evacuate the boxes and retreat towards Egypt, the garrison of El Adem slipping away during the night of 17 June. During the long retreat to the El Alamein position, 12 AA Bde under Brigadier Percy Calvert-Jones fell back in a series of rearguard actions at landing grounds, in the course of which it concentrated a sizeable body of troops. Eighth Army gave Calvert-Jones two infantry brigades and 'Calforce' held defensive positions at 10 landing-grounds, providing its own artillery support from AA guns sited for ground tasks. Calforce remained in position during the First Battle of El Alamein and was not withdrawn from the front line until September.

When Eighth Army reorganised for the Second Battle of El Alamein, 88th HAA Rgt (with 16 3.7-inch guns) was still under 12 AA Bde. As before, its role in the forthcoming offensive was to defend the Desert Air Force's airfields, with batteries working under the command of the Royal Air Force (RAF) tactical wing to which they were allocated. The 11-day battle to break through the Axis lines opened on 23 October, and after the break-out the airfields at Gambut and El Adem were quickly secured, 12 AA Bde's units following close behind. By January, 88th HAA Rgt with 281 and 283 HAA Btys, was at Castel Benito, while 276 HAA Bty from 68th (North Midland) HAA Rgt (68th HAA Rgt was captured at Tobruk; 276 HAA Bty escaped having been detached to 12th AA Bde), was brought up from reserve to defend the captured supply ports on the Libyan coast. 276 HAA Battery was formally regimented with 88th HAA Rgt from 3 September 1943.

When the Battle of the Mareth Line began in March 1943, 12 AA Bde was once again conducting forward airfield defence, covering nine forward landing-grounds, all within 20 miles (32 km) of enemy positions. Typically, an airfield was given one HAA and two LAA batteries, sited to engage tanks as well as aircraft. 88th HAA Regiment sited four-gun Troops beyond the ends of the runway, with arcs of fire facing outwards, those in the centre having full AA instruments. If the airfield was considered especially vulnerable to enemy ground attack, an inner 'Keep' was formed between the runways with HAA guns in two-gun positions interlaced with Bofors guns. Once the Mareth Line was broken, 12 Aa Bde took over new airfields and also coastal ports. The regimental historian records that '[i]t became a point of honour for AA batteries to be among the first in; at Gabès, for instance, RHQ 88th HAA Regiment, with one HAA and three LAA batteries, entered the town two hours after its capture'. 12 AA Brigade ended its 1,500 miles (2,400 km) advance from El Alemein at Gabès, Sousse and Enfidaville, remaining in action for AA defence after the Tunisian Campaign ended with Axis surrender on 13 May 1943.

=== Italy ===
88th HAA Regiment did not participate in the Allied invasion of Sicily (Operation Husky) in July 1943, but was on the island, defending airfields around Lentini under 73 AA Bde, by the time the Eighth Army launched its landings on mainland Italy (Operation Baytown) in September. Afterwards, 88th HAA Rgt was transported to Taranto and travelled across to reinforce 2 AA Bde around the port of Bari and the Foggia Airfield Complex. On 27 October 2 AA Bde moved forward to a fresh set of landing-grounds and a railhead in support of 1st Canadian Division. 2 Aa Brigade's commander, Brigadier Murray McIntyre, was an enthusiast for using the versatile 3.7-inch HAA guns for ground support tasks. The crossing of the Sangro and Biferno rivers at the end of November was an opportunity for this, involving long artillery fire programmes for the HAA guns.

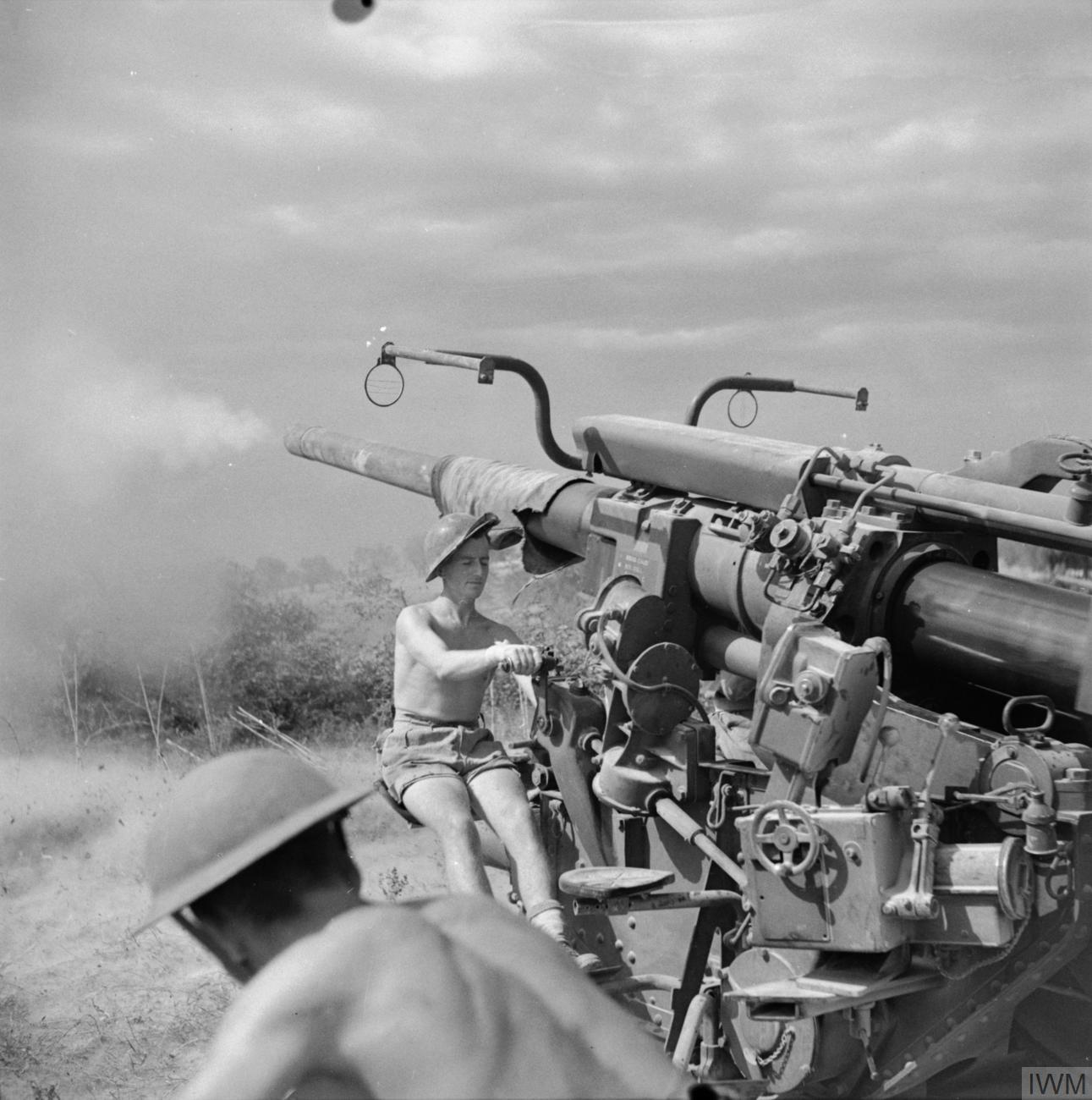
3.7-inch gun of 2 AA Bde bombarding enemy positions on the Gothic Line, 2 September 1944.

During the winter of 1943–44, when Eighth Army faced the German Winter Line, McIntyre disposed two-thirds of his HAA guns in the forward area on ground shoots, the rest at landing grounds as far back as Foggia, and he rotated batteries between the tasks. There were still some vicious air attacks: in one action 88th HAA Rgt was dive-bombed and 15 men killed while the guns fought back with a mixture of predicted and gun-control shoots. For 'Operation Kishan', carried out by 10th Infantry Brigade in May 1944, 84th (Middlesex, London Transport) and 88th HAA Rgts deployed 44 guns and fired 9881 rounds in bombardment and harassing fire in one week. When the Adriatic coast campaign began moving again in May 1944, 2 AA Bde moved up with V Corps protecting airfields and field gun positions, and in July it reached the port of Ancona.

At Ancona, 2 AA Bde was relieved by 8 AA Bde, which took over command of 88th HAA Rgt. Coming under Fifth US Army, the brigade's guns were deployed to defend the US Army Air Force airfields around Rome in the Tiber Valley. As the Allied advance continued, however, the AA commitment round Rome could be reduced, and 88th HAA Rgt moved again, to 66 AA Bde. This brigade took on responsibility for Piombino, San Stefano and, from October 1944, for Livorno. However, the British Army was suffering a severe manpower shortage and a number of AA units deemed surplus were disbanded to provide reinforcements to other arms of service. 88th HAA Regiment was one such unit and it was broken up and formally placed in 'suspended animation' on 1 September.

== Postwar ==
When the TA was reconstituted on 1 January 1947, the regiment was reformed at White City as 488th Heavy Anti-Aircraft Regiment, Royal Artillery (TA).

On 15 July 1950 the regiment was amalgamated with 453 (City of London) HAA Rgt (the former 53rd (CoL) AA Rgt that had provided the cadre for 88th AA Rgt in 1939) as 453/488 Heavy Anti-Aircraft Regiment at Shepherd's Bush.

This amalgamated regiment lasted until the disbandment of AA Command on 10 March 1955 when there were wholesale mergers among TA units and 453/488 HAA Rgt was merged into 452 (London) HAA Rgt.
