= I Anti-Aircraft Corps =

- Formation sign of I Anti-Aircraft Corps.
- Active: 11 November 1940 – 30 September 1942
- Country: United Kingdom
- Branch: British Army
- Type: Anti-Aircraft corps
- Role: Air Defence
- Part of: Anti-Aircraft Command
- Garrison/HQ: Uxbridge
- Engagements: The Blitz; Baedeker Blitz; Battle of the Fringe Targets

I Anti-Aircraft Corps (I AA Corps) was a high-level formation of Britain's Anti-Aircraft Command from 1940 to 1942. It defended Southern England and Wales during the Blitz and the middle years of the Second World War.

== Origin ==
AA Command had been created in 1938 to control the Territorial Army's rapidly-expanding anti-aircraft (AA) organisation within Air Defence of Great Britain. On the outbreak of war in September 1939, it commanded seven AA Divisions, each with several AA Brigades, disposed around the United Kingdom. Continued expansion made this organisation unwieldy, so in November 1940 – during the Luftwaffe's nightly Blitz on London and other British cities – five further AA Divisions were organised, and all the divisions grouped under three corps headquarters directly subordinate to AA Command. The largest of these was I AA Corps, covering Southern England and South Wales, which by February 1941 comprised five AA divisions and 20 brigades. Its boundaries roughly coincided with No. 10 Group RAF and No. 11 Group RAF of RAF Fighter Command.

== Order of battle ==
I AA Corps had the following organisation from February 1941:

Corps HQ: Uxbridge

General Officer Commanding:

- Lieutenant-General S.R. Wason (11 November 1940 to 14 February 1942)
- Lieutenant-General C.A.E. Cadell (14 February 1942 to 30 September 1942)

=== 1st AA Division ===
Became independent, directly under AA Command, during April 1942

- 26th (London) Anti-Aircraft Brigade (London Inner Artillery Zone)
- 38th Light Anti-Aircraft Brigade (London Searchlight layout)
- 48th Anti-Aircraft Brigade (London IAZ)
- 49th Anti-Aircraft Brigade (London IAZ)

=== 5th AA Division ===
- 27th (Home Counties) Anti-Aircraft Brigade (Sector layout)
- 35th Anti-Aircraft Brigade (Portsmouth)
- 47th Anti-Aircraft Brigade (Sector layout)
- 65th Anti-Aircraft Brigade (Southampton)

=== 6th AA Division ===
- 6th Anti-Aircraft Brigade (Essex airfields, sector layout)
- 28th (Thames and Medway) Anti-Aircraft Brigade (Thames South, Chatham, Dover)
- 29th (East Anglian) Anti-Aircraft Brigade (Sector layout)
- 37th Anti-Aircraft Brigade (Thames North)
- 56th Light Anti-Aircraft Brigade (Airfields, sector layout)

=== 8th AA Division ===
- 46th Anti-Aircraft Brigade (Bristol)
- 55th Light Anti-Aircraft Brigade (Plymouth, Falmouth)
- 60th Anti-Aircraft Brigade (Exeter, Yeovil, Portland)
- 64th Anti-Aircraft Brigade (Airfields, sector layout)
- 69th Anti-Aircraft Brigade joined in June 1941

=== 9th AA Division ===
- 5th Anti-Aircraft Brigade (Gloucester, Hereford)
- 45th Anti-Aircraft Brigade (Cardiff, Newport)
- 61st Anti-Aircraft Brigade (Swansea, Milford Haven)

=== Intermediate Ammunition Depots ===
- Fort Efford, Plymouth
- Black Park, near Uxbridge
- Takeley, near Bishop's Stortford
- Mereworth Woods, near Sevenoaks
- Castleton, Newport
- Bramley Central Ammunition Depot (controlled by War Office)

=== Equipment Ammunition Magazines ===
- Swansea
- Monmouth
- Burnett near Bristol
- Nothe Fort, Weymouth
- Fort Nelson, Fareham
- Tipner, Cosham
- Banstead, Surrey
- Chelsfield, Sevenoaks
- Mill Hill
- Purfleet, Essex
- Pitsea, Essex
- Warley, Essex
- Shoeburyness
- Hadleigh, Suffolk
- Chattenden, near Rochester, Kent
- Fort Horsted, Chatham, Kent
- Lydden, Dover
- East Penner, Pembroke
- Sheerness
- Ryde, Isle of Wight

== Operations ==
As soon as it was organised, I AA Corps had to deal with the heaviest weight of the 1940–41 Blitz on London and cities such as Bristol, Cardiff, Plymouth, Portsmouth, Southampton and Swansea. It was responsible for the London Inner Artillery Zone and the Thames North and South AA belts, together with major Gun Defence Areas (GDAs) around Dover, the Solent, Plymouth, Bristol and South Wales, with 'Indicator Belts' and 'Killer Belts' of searchlights in between, the former working with the GDAs and RAF Sectors, the latter with the night fighters in the air. Redeployment was called for in 1942 when the Luftwaffe began the 'Baedeker raids' on cities such as Bath, Canterbury and Exeter, that had previously warranted little AA defence. Later, further redeployment, particularly of light AA guns, was necessary when the south coast towns of England were attacked by 'hit and run' raids, mainly by single-engined fighter-bombers, often evading radar detection, in what became known as the 'Battle of the Fringe Targets'. In August 1942 the 3rd AA Divisional HQ was moved south from Scotland to join I AA Corps and assist in controlling the large number of AA units brought by this redeployment. It was given control of 27th, 47th and 64th AA Bdes, but this lasted only for a short time.

== Disbandment ==
The AA Corps and Divisional HQs were disbanded on 30 September 1942 and a replaced by a more flexible system of AA Groups, each aligned with a Group of RAF Fighter Command. The area covered by I AA Corps became the responsibility of three of the new groups: 1st AA Group (London) and 2nd AA Group (South East England) with 11 Group RAF, and 3rd AA Group (South West England and South Wales) with 10 Group RAF.

== External sources ==
- British Military History
- Generals of World War II
