= 53rd (City of London) Heavy Anti-Aircraft Regiment, Royal Artillery =

Military unit of the British Territorial Army

53rd (City of London) Heavy Anti-Aircraft Regiment 85th (City of London) Medium Regiment
- Cap Badge of the Royal Artillery (pre-1953)
- Active: 1922–1961
- Country: United Kingdom
- Branch: Territorial Army
- Role: Air Defence; Medium Artillery
- Size: Regiment
- Engagements: Battle of France; The Blitz; Calcutta Blitz; Burma Campaign 1944–45 (159 (Lloyd's) Bty)

Commanders
- Notable commanders: Lt-Col Robert Whittaker; Lt-Col Vere Krohn

53rd (City of London) Heavy Anti-Aircraft Regiment, Royal Artillery was a volunteer air defence unit of Britain's Territorial Army from 1922 until 1961. During World War II it fought in the Battle of France and The Blitz, and later served in India, where it was converted to Medium Artillery. Postwar it reverted to the AA artillery role.

== Origin ==
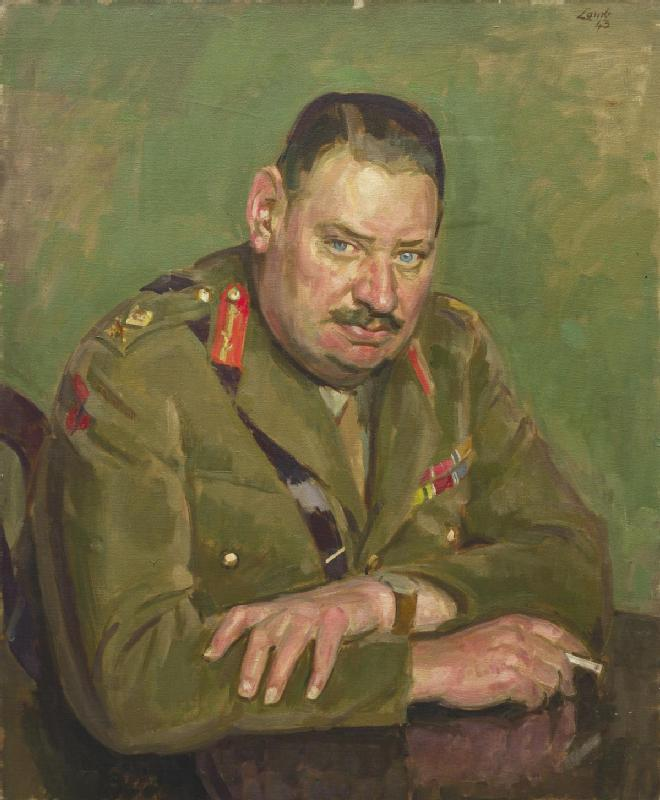
Robert Whittaker, City banker and CO of 53rd (CoL) HAA Rgt; later chief of staff to AA Command

German air raids by Zeppelin airships and Gotha bombers on London and other British cities during World War I had shown the need for strong anti-aircraft (AA) defences in any future war. When the Territorial Army (TA) was reformed in 1922 it included a number of dedicated AA units. The third of these was 53rd (City of London) Anti-Aircraft Brigade, recruited largely from men working in the finance industry in the City of London. It was formed in the Royal Field Artillery (RFA), but on 8 February 1923 it was transferred to the Royal Garrison Artillery (RGA), which had provided the AA batteries in World War I. However, on 1 June 1924 the RGA and RFA merged to become simply the Royal Artillery (RA). The regiment comprised 157th, 158th and 159th (London) AA Batteries. 159th Battery was recruited from the Lloyd's of London insurance market and in August 1924 it added the subtitle 'Lloyd's' in front of 'London'; in February 1925 all the batteries' subtitles changed from 'London' to 'City of London'.

One of the first officers appointed to the regiment was Robert Whittaker, a City banker who had seen service with the RGA during World War I. He was commissioned as a major and commanded 158th (CoL) Battery, and later the whole regiment, The Regimental Headquarters was at the War Office Department in White City, London. The unit formed part of 27th (London) Air Defence Brigade. These original TA AA units were formed on a low peacetime establishment with a few old 3-inch guns on static mounts.

As Britain's AA defences expanded during the 1930s, higher formations became necessary. 1st AA Division was formed in 1935 to cover London and the Home Counties, and the 53rd AA Brigade was reassigned to 26th (London) AA Group within the division. Lieutenant-Colonel Whittaker was promoted to command this brigade in early 1939. On 1 January 1939 the RA replaced its traditional unit designation 'Brigade' by the modern 'Regiment'. Anti-Aircraft Command was formed in April 1939 to command all TA air defences in the UK. As part of the doubling of the strength of the TA after the Munich Crisis, 53 AA Regiment formed a duplicate regiment in 1939 at White City, which was designated 88 AA Regiment.

== World War II ==
=== Mobilisation ===
The regiment was embodied on 5 August 1939 and occupied gun positions in parks and open ground around London: 157 Bty at Southwark Park and Brockley in south-east London and at Gunnersbury Park and Hurlingham Park in west London; 158 Bty at Hyde Park and Wormwood Scrubs, with its HQ at Fairlop and also occupying various sites in Essex east of London; 159 Bty with HQ at Finsbury Park and sites at Friern Barnet in north London. In early September, elements of 88 AA Regiment took over 157 Bty's positions and the battery moved to Bramley, Surrey where it came under 5 AA Division. Thus the regiment was fully deployed when war was declared on 3 September.

The regiment manned static gun sites designated as Heavy AA (HAA) containing both the older 3-inch and newer 3.7-inch AA guns. They were moved frequently: by the end of September 1939, 157 Bty was stationed around Cheshunt in Hertfordshire, 158 at Enfield and Edmonton in Middlesex, and 159 at Cuffley, Hertfordshire, with Regimental HQ at Bush Hill Park.

=== France ===
On 7 October 1939 the regiment received orders to proceed overseas. The regiment had to be brought up to war establishment and equipped with mobile equipment, albeit on a reduced scale because of shortages and the semi-static role envisaged for HAA units. It landed at Cherbourg on 16 October equipped with 3-inch guns and joined the Royal Air Force's Advanced Air Striking Force (AASF) at Reims in France. It formed part of 12 AA Bde, tasked with defending the AASF's airfields. 53 HAA was responsible for the northern group of airfields; 157 Battery manned sites codenamed PIP I and PIP II around Villers-Marmery, 158 manned SQUEAK I and SQUEAK II around Guignecourt, and 159 manned WILFRED I and WILFRED II around Cernay-lès-Reims; RHQ was codenamed PIXO. (Pip, Squeak and Wilfred were characters in a popular newspaper strip cartoon.)

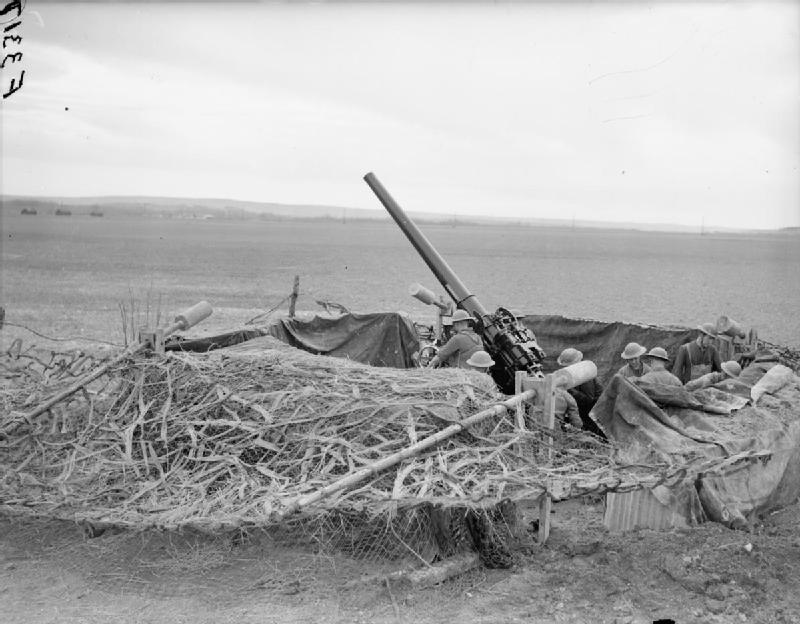
3.7-inch anti-aircraft gun attached to the AASF (Advanced Air Striking Force) near Rheims for airfield defence, 23 March 1940.

The regiment remained in its positions throughout the Phoney War, expanding some of its 2-gun sites to 4 guns, building new 2-gun sites, and paying particular attention to Camouflage. In April 1940, a detachment of 3rd Searchlight Regiment RA was attached to SQUEAK II to evaluate RDF (early Radar) sets. 7 Searchlight Battery of 2nd Searchlight Regiment RA, with 24 searchlights and 24 Bren guns, and 162 Battery of 54 (Argyll and Sutherland Highlanders) Light AA Regiment were distributed near to 53's sites for close defence.

On 10 May 1940, the Germans began their attack on France and the Low Countries with heavy bombing raids on airfields. Over succeeding days 53 Regiment's AA and Bren guns frequently engaged enemy aircraft – it claimed 8–10 shot down in six days – although some of their positions were machine-gunned from the air and 158 Bty's HQ was bombed. By 14 May it was clear that the AASF would have to move back to airfields deeper in France. This was difficult for the heavy AA because of the shortage of towing vehicles, and 53 AA Rgt had to leave behind 16 of its 24 guns. The regiment reached the Troyes area on the River Seine on 16 May and immediately sent parties back to recover the abandoned equipment – one such group being captured by the advancing Germans – and succeeded in retrieving all but six of its guns.

As the situation deteriorated, 53 AA Rgt was split up on 21 May: numerous personnel, guns and transport were transferred from 157 and 159 Btys to 158 Bty and other units of 12 AA Bde to bring them up to strength, while the remainder moved to Nantes in the Loire region to help guard a new base. 157 and 159 Btys, each with seven guns, and 7 S/L Bty (without searchlights), occupied positions on either side of the River Loire.

By 4 June, while the bulk of the British Expeditionary Force had been evacuated from Dunkirk, the troops on the Loire were still in position. On 6 June, 53 AA Rgt learned that it was to move 630 miles to southern France. The advance party reached Salon-de-Provence, near Marseille on 9 June, joining HADDOCK FORCE, whose airfields were to support bombing raids by RAF Wellingtons against Italian targets. Together with the Bofors guns of No 2 Troop, 162 Bty, of 54 LAA, the regiment's 13 remaining 3-inch guns provided the AA defence for HADDOCK FORCE. 158 Bty was evacuated with 12 AA Bde from St. Nazaire, and a party was on board HMT Lancastria when she was sunk with heavy loss of life on 17 June.

By 17 June it was clear that France was about to surrender, and plans were made to evacuate HADDOCK FORCE by sea from Marseille. The AA detachments under command of 53 Regt were assigned to the SS Alma Dawson. A French dockyard strike prevented them from loading any of the 3-inch guns or vehicles, but the Bofors guns were mounted on the ship's decks. The ship put to sea on 18 June and slowly made its way to Gibraltar, where the AA gunners disembarked and temporarily reinforced the garrison. On 27 June, 82 HAA Regiment arrived on the SS City of Cairo, and once they had been unloaded with their guns and equipment, 53 AA Rgt boarded the ship and sailed in convoy for the UK on 2 July.

=== Home Forces ===
53 HAA disembarked at Liverpool on 12 July and the men entrained for London, where the regiment came under the command of 49 AA Bde. Since 1 June, along with other AA units equipped with 3-inch or 3.7-inch guns, the 53rd had been formally designated a Heavy AA Regiment. By 22 July, 157 Bty was manning static HAA gun sites in Dulwich and Woolwich under the command of 54 (City of London) HAA Regiment and 97 (London Scottish) HAA Regiment, while 159 Bty took over sites round Slough and Windsor. After various changes in location and command during the summer of 1940, the regiment moved to Rainham, Kent and joined 28 (Thames and Medway) AA Bde at the beginning of October, during the early stages of the London Blitz.

In September 1940, Lt-Col Vere Krohn, who had commanded 53 HAA since before the outbreak of war, left the regiment for an appointment at AA Command, where he later headed the technical staff. In the autumn, the regiment was re-equipped with 3-inch guns and sent to the live firing range at Aberporth for retraining.

In February 1941, RHQ moved to Croydon and came under 48 AA Bde. 53 HAA was now designated as a mobile AA unit and had its own Royal Corps of Signals section and Royal Army Service Corps section with additional vehicles. In October 1941 the regiment was posted to Dover (where it experienced occasional German shelling) but at the end of the month prepared for deployment overseas once more.

=== Far East ===
On 1 May 1942, the regiment disembarked at Bombay in India with 24 static 3.7-inch guns. On 19 May it moved to Calcutta, (leaving 159 Bty behind at Bombay) and came under the command of 1st Indian AA Bde. 159 Battery later moved to Ceylon, where it joined 52 (London) HAA Regiment and took part in the Burma Campaign 1944–45.

The Imperial Japanese Army Air Service began raiding Calcutta during the winter of 1942–43 and 53 HAA Regiment was involved in the defence of the city. On the night of 15 January 1943 the regiment did not engage the attackers, but observed as three were shot down by a Beaufighter night fighter piloted by Flight-Sergeant Maurice Pring. In January 1943, the regiment was joined by 154 (London) Battery from 52 HAA Regiment in exchange for 159 Bty. It also commanded 202 Bty detached from 56 (Cornwall) HAA Regiment. 53 Regiment re-converted to the mobile HAA role and came under the command of 2nd Indian AA Bde, remaining at Calcutta until May 1944, when it moved to Nira under 9 AA Bde at Poona.

In July 1944 the regiment underwent a major reorganisation, converting to the medium artillery role at Poona. Initially designated 'A' Medium Regiment, it became 85th (City of London) Medium Regiment, Royal Artillery on 24 August, with 157 and 158 Medium Batteries, while 202 Bty returned to 56 HAA, which became 'B' Medium Regiment (later 86 Medium Regiment) and 154 Battery moved to 'C' Medium Regiment (later 87 Medium Regiment).

In September, 85 Medium Regiment moved to Secunderabad while remaining under the command of 9 AA Bde, then in December it moved to Ranchi and came under the command of RA Training HQ No 40. Here it began training with new equipment, at first the 25-pounder field gun, then the obsolescent 6-inch howitzer in 'Bunker-buster' mode, and finally the 5.5-inch medium gun.

Having fully trained on its new equipment, 85 Medium Regiment joined 59th Army Group Royal Artillery (AGRA) on 18 May 1945 with which it remained until the end of the war.

In July 1945, 85 Med Regt formed an additional 'R' Battery from personnel who were not due for early demobilisation, and others transferred from 69 LAA Regiment which was returning to the UK. When the war ended, 59 AGRA was undergoing intensive training and waterproofing its vehicles for participation in Operation Zipper, a proposed landing by XXXIV Corps to liberate Malaya. The regiment and its batteries were placed in suspended animation on 1 March 1946

== Postwar ==
The regiment was reconstituted in the TA on 1 January 1947 as 453rd (London) Heavy Anti-Aircraft Regiment, Royal Artillery at Shepherd's Bush. In 1950 it amalgamated with 488 HAA Regt (the successor of its duplicate 88 HAA Regiment formed at White City in 1939) as 453rd/488th Heavy Anti-Aircraft Regiment, Royal Artillery (City of London) – the only TA artillery regiment to have two numbers in its title.

When AA Command was disbanded in 1955 the regiment underwent a further amalgamation with three other London HAA regiments: 452 (London), 454 (City of London) and 497 (Hammersmith) to form 452 (London) HAA:

- RHQ Battery – from 453/488 HAA
- P (Middlesex) Battery – from 452 HAA
- Q (Lloyd's City of London Battery) – from 454 HAA
- R (Hammersmith) Battery – from 497 HAA

In 1961 the regiment amalgamated again with 264 (7th London) and 290 (City of London) Field Regiments and 353 (London) Medium Regiment to form 254 (City of London) Field Regiment, including Q (53rd London) Battery. When the TA was reduced into the Territorial and Army Volunteer Reserve in 1967 the merged regiment was reduced to a single battery and the 53rd Anti-Aircraft lineage ended.

== Badge ==
The regiment adopted a collar badge of the brass RA grenade with the City of London arms on the ball and a pair of silver wings sprouting from the shoulders of the grenade. Instead of the RA motto UBIQUE, the scroll underneath the grenade was inscribed '53 (CoL) A.A. Bde RA'. This badge was also worn on the side of steel helmets and painted on vehicles during WWII.

== Prominent members ==
Among those who served in the regiment were:

- Lt-Col Lord Moynihan, OBE, TD, a stockbroker.
- Capt Viscount Moore (later the 11th Earl of Drogheda, KG) who became chairman of the Financial Times.

== Honorary Colonel ==
The following served as Honorary Colonel of the regiment:

- Lt-Col Sir Frederick Hall, 1st Baronet, DSO, MP, a member of Lloyd's of London, appointed 23 May 1923, died 28 April 1932
- Lt-Col Sir Arthur Heneage, DSO, MP, appointed 1934
