= General Whitaker =

General Whitaker may refer to:

- Denis Whitaker (1915–2001), Canadian Army brigadier general
- Walter C. Whitaker (1823–1887), Union Army brigadier general and brevet major general
- Robert Whittaker (British Army officer) (1894–1967), British Army major general

== See also ==
- Attorney General Whitaker (disambiguation)
