= Attorney General Whitaker =

Attorney General Whitaker may refer to:

- Frederick Whitaker (1812–1891), Attorney-General of New Zealand
- Matthew Whitaker (born 1969), Acting Attorney General of the United States
- Norman William Whittaker (1893–1983), Attorney General of British Columbia

== See also ==
- General Whitaker (disambiguation)
