= Sydney Rigby Wason =

British Army officer (1887–1969)

Lieutenant-General Sydney Rigby Wason CB MC & Bar
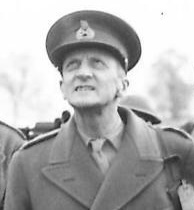
- Wason in February 1941
- Born: 27 September 1887; Newton Stewart, Wigtownshire, Scotland
- Died: 17 March 1969 (aged 81); Winchester, Hampshire, England
- Military career
- Allegiance: United Kingdom
- Branch: British Army
- Service years: 1907–1942
- Rank: Lieutenant-General
- Service number: 4037
- Unit: Royal Artillery
- Commands: I Anti-Aircraft Corps (1940–42); School of Artillery, Larkhill (1938–39)
- Conflicts: First World War; Second World War: Battle of Dunkirk
- Awards: Companion of the Order of the Bath; Military Cross & Bar; Mentioned in Despatches

Lieutenant-General Sydney Rigby Wason, CB, MC & Bar (27 September 1887 – 17 March 1969) was a senior British Army officer in the Second World War. His commands included a corps during the Battle of France and the anti-aircraft defences of Southern England and Wales during the Blitz.

== Early life and family ==
Born on 27 September 1887 at Newton Stewart, Wigtownshire, Scotland, Sydney Rigby Wason was the son of James Wason, a solicitor, and Wilhelmina Margarita, née Nixon. He married Winifred Mary at Chelsea in 1921. The cognitive psychologist Peter Cathcart Wason was his second cousin.

== Military career ==
Wason studied at the Royal Military Academy, Woolwich, and was subsequently commissioned as a second lieutenant in the Royal Artillery in July 1907.

During the First World War as a captain and acting major in the Royal Artillery, he was awarded the Military Cross three times, twice for leading a raid into enemy lines and for observation while under fire. He was first awarded the Military Cross on 2 February 1916, before receiving a first medal bar on 26 September 1917, and a second bar on 17 December 1917.

In the interwar period, Wason attended the Staff College, Camberley, in the 1920s. He rose to become General Staff Officer of Western Command in 1936, and Commandant of the School of Artillery, Larkhill in 1938.

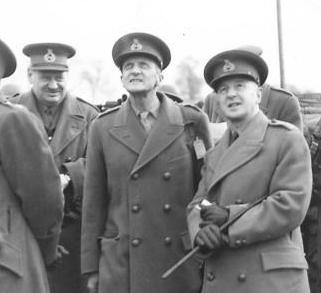
Major General Robert Whittaker (centre left); Lieutenant General Sydney Wason (centre), and Lieutenant General Sir Frederick Pile (centre right) at Anti-Aircraft Command on 14 February 1941 during a visit by David Margesson, the Secretary of State for War.

At the outbreak of the Second World War, Wason was appointed Major General Royal Artillery at the General Headquarters Staff of the British Expeditionary Force (BEF) in France. On 26 May 1940 in the prelude to the Battle of Dunkirk, the commander of III Corps, Lieutenant-General Sir Ronald Forbes Adam, was redeployed to organise the Dunkirk perimeter and Wason was appointed in his place. Realising that the planned retirement route for his corps would cross with the route planned for the French forces, he immediately set off to drive to their headquarters in an attempt to avoid a confused clash between the two armies. Unfortunately, the roads were clogged with refugees and retreating troops; his return journey took two full days, during which the corps was without its leader. This may have caused serious consequences for the 2nd Infantry Division, which was not ordered to withdraw behind the Canal Line until most of its units had been effectively destroyed. However, Wason was mentioned in despatches for his command of III Corps, which assumed the defence of the western Dunkirk perimeter until its evacuation.

On his return to the United Kingdom, Wason was appointed General Officer Commanding, I Anti-Aircraft Corps, and given the acting rank of lieutenant general in November 1940. In July 1941, he was appointed a Companion of the Order of the Bath. Wason's opposition to women serving as anti-aircraft gun crew led to a clash with Winston Churchill, who may have taken this as a personal affront, since his daughter, Sarah, was serving in the armed forces. Wason was retired in 1942 and was never offered a knighthood as would have been usual for an officer of his rank and experience. Subsequently, he took up a role as Military Correspondent for the BBC European Service.

== Death ==
Wason died on 17 March 1969, in Winchester, Hampshire.

== Bibliography ==
- Grehan, John (2018). Dunkirk Nine Days That Saved an Army: A Day by Day Account of the Greatest Evacuation. Yorkshire: Frontline Books. ISBN 978-1526724847.
- Manktelow, Ken (2020). Beyond Reasoning: The Life, Times and Work of Peter Wason, Pioneering Psychologist. London: Routledge. ISBN 978-0367645748.
- Murland, Jerry (2019). The Dunkirk Perimeter and Evacuation 1940: France and Flanders Campaign. Yorkshire: Pen & Sword Military. ISBN 978-1473852235.
- Smart, Nick (2005). Biographical Dictionary of British Generals of the Second World War. Barnesley: Pen & Sword. ISBN 1844150496.

Military offices
Preceded by Henry Pownall	Commandant of the School of Artillery, Larkhill; 1938–1939	Succeeded by Francis FitzGibbon
