= Robert Whittaker (British Army officer) =

Major-General Robert Whittaker CB CBE TD
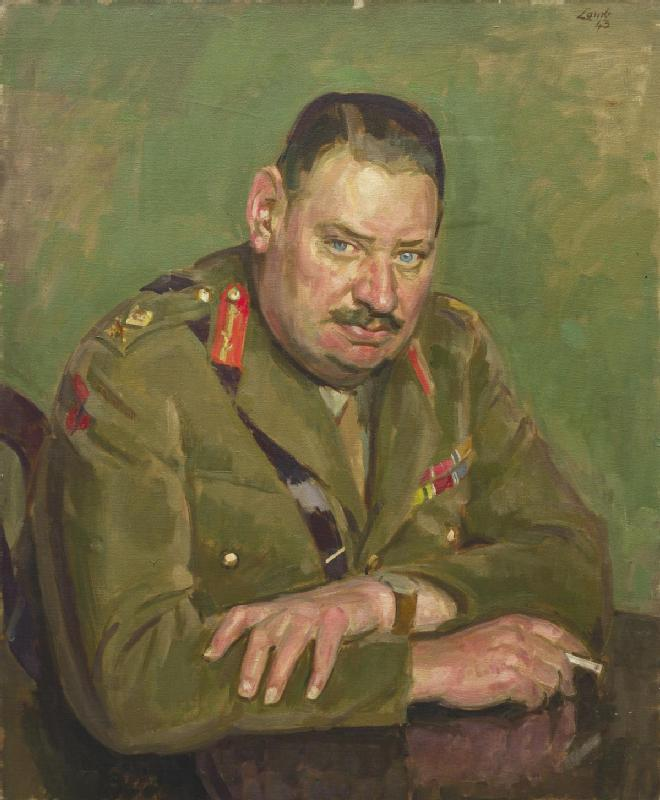
- Born: 18 June 1894
- Died: 17 February 1967 (aged 72); London, England
- Military career
- Allegiance: United Kingdom
- Branch: British Army
- Service years: 1914–1945?
- Rank: Major-General
- Nickname: "Whit"
- Service number: 7960
- Units: Royal Garrison Artillery; Royal Artillery
- Commands: 26th (London) Anti-Aircraft Brigade; 1st Anti-Aircraft Division
- Conflicts: World War I World War II
- Awards: Commander of the Order of the British Empire; Companion of the Order of the Bath; Territorial Decoration

Major-General Robert Frederick Edward Whittaker, CB, CBE, TD (18 June 1894 – 17 February 1967) was a City of London banker and a senior officer in Britain's part-time Territorial Army (TA). He rose to the position of chief of staff at Anti-Aircraft Command during World War II.

== Early life and business career ==
Whittaker was educated at Ardingly College. On leaving school in 1911, Whittaker began a career in banking. He became a Fellow of the Institute of Bankers in 1940, and was general manager (Administration) of Lloyds Bank from 1952 until his retirement in 1957.

== Military career ==
=== World War I ===
While at Ardingly Whittaker had been a member of the Officers' Training Corps 1909–11. He joined the Royal Garrison Artillery (RGA) after World War I broke out in 1914, and was commissioned as a second lieutenant on 13 March 1915 in No 1 Company of the Kent RGA (Territorial Force) based at Fort Clarence in Rochester. He was promoted to lieutenant on 1 June 1916 and saw active service in France and Belgium. With the war over in November 1918, he married the following year.

=== Territorial Army ===
When the Territorial Force was reformed as the Territorial Army (TA) in the early 1920s, Whittaker was one of the first officers appointed to a new RGA unit, the 53rd (City of London) Anti-Aircraft Brigade. The regiment was drawn mainly from those working in the financial sector in the City of London, one whole battery being recruited from the Lloyd's of London insurance market. Whittaker was re-commissioned, in the rank of major on 22 November 1922 and became Officer Commanding of 158th (City of London) Battery. Whittaker was promoted to lieutenant colonel on 1 January 1931 and appointed Commanding Officer of 53rd (CoL) AA Bde on 31 October 1933. He was awarded the Territorial Decoration (TD). On 30 October 1936 he was promoted to colonel and in 1938 he was awarded the OBE.

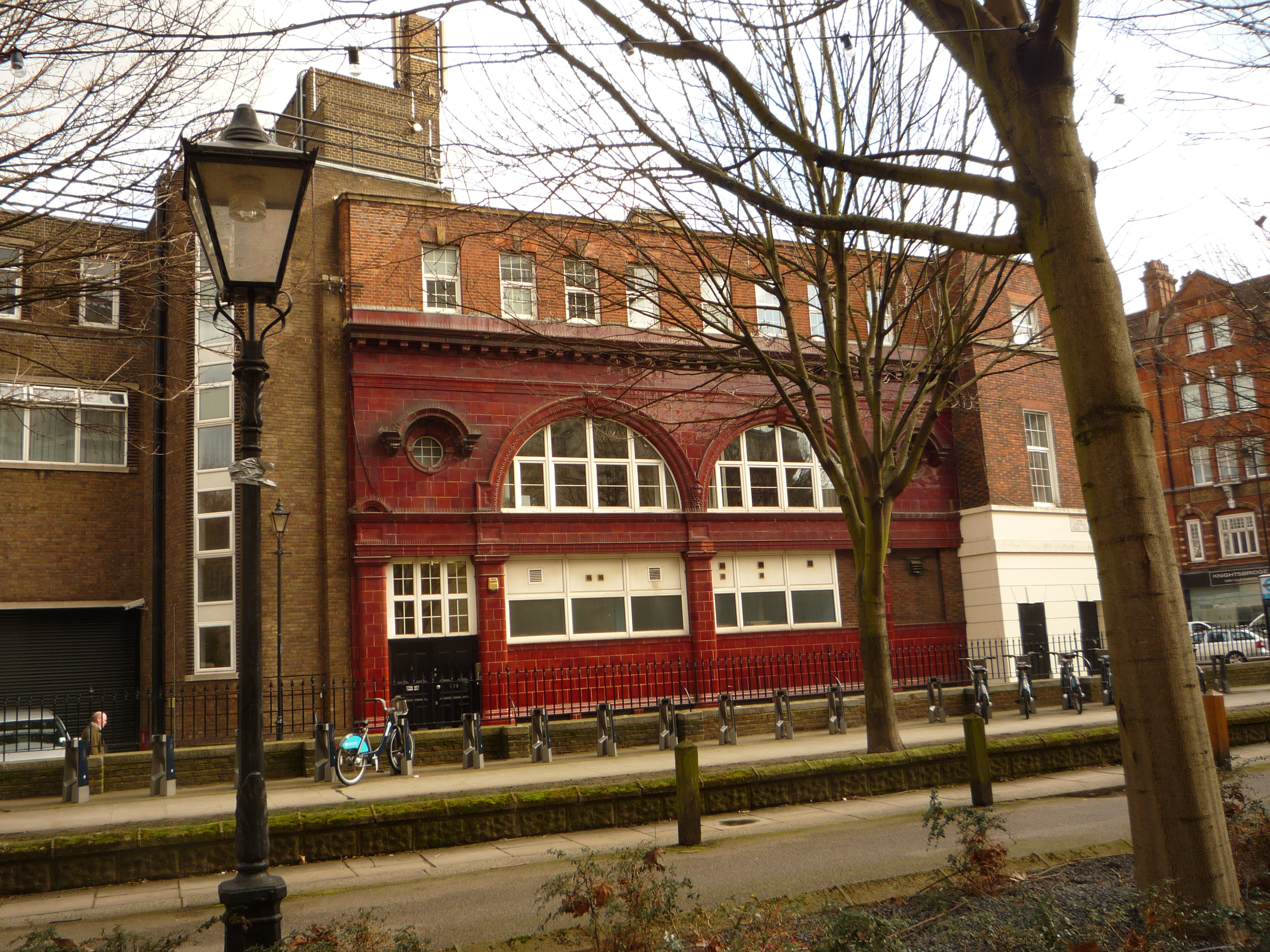
206 Brompton Road, the former Brompton Road tube station closed in 1934, used as the headquarters of Whittaker's 26th (London) AA Brigade and of the London Inner Artillery Zone during World War II.

The threat of air raids on the United Kingdom, in the event of war with Germany, led to an expansion of the TA's Anti-Aircraft (AA) units in the 1930, which accelerated after the Munich Crisis of 1938, when the TA had been briefly mobilised for war. Whittaker was promoted to brigadier and appointed commander of 26th (London) Anti-Aircraft Brigade (including his old regiment) on 18 January 1939. 26th AA Bde, controlling several regiments of heavy anti-aircraft (HAA) guns, was a critical part of the air defences of London. Just before the outbreak of war, the brigade moved its headquarters to Brompton Road in South Kensington, where a Piccadilly line underground railway station had been disused since 1934. The tunnels, subways and lift-shafts of the station were adapted to provide bomb-proof accommodation, and it became the control centre for the whole of the London Inner Artillery Zone (IAZ) under 1st AA Division.

=== World War II ===
Whittaker commanded his brigade from this HQ during the training period of the Phoney War, through the Battle of Britain and into the early part of The Blitz. On 12 November 1940 he was promoted Acting Major-General to command 1st AA Division, making him the most senior TA officer in Anti-Aircraft Command (and the third most senior active TA officer during the war).

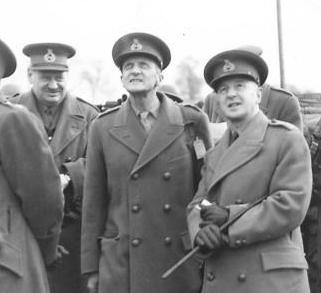
Major General Robert Whittaker (centre left); Lieutenant General Sydney Wason (centre), and Lieutenant General Sir Frederick Pile (centre right) at Anti-Aircraft Command on 14 February 1941 during a visit by David Margesson, the Secretary of State for War.

In January 1941, improved gun control radar was beginning to be introduced to HAA units. To make best use of this equipment, the commander-in-chief of AA Command, Lieutenant-General Sir Frederick ('Tim') Pile, ordered the operators to send their plots to the Gun Operations Rooms (GORs) where the data could be integrated. The system proved no better than the old methods and was opposed by Whittaker, who carried out his own experiments in 1st AA Division and developed new methods for 'unseen' fire. He convinced Pile to restore fire control to the gun sites themselves, using their own radar plotters.

On 1 January 1942, Whittaker became Major-General, General Staff (chief of staff) to Pile, with the rank of Temporary Major-General. This was a period of intense organisational pressure on AA Command and its staff: already short of manpower, its best men were drained away for active service overseas and had to be replaced by women of the Auxiliary Territorial Service and part-timers of the Home Guard, who had to be integrated. A new streamlined command structure was introduced, with divisions and corps reduced to a single layer of Group headquarters more closely matching those of RAF Fighter Command. New rocketry and radar technologies had to be introduced, and defences repositioned to meet new threats, such as the Baedeker raids, and the Luftwaffe's 'hit and run' attacks on the South Coast of England.

In February 1944, after more than two years in the post, Whittaker was moved to command 2 AA Group, which was responsible for defending South East England. At the time the group was dealing with small-scale night raids coming over the coast heading towards London (the 'Baby Blitz') and with reorganising the defences of Southern England to cover the build-up of troops, shipping and equipment for the forthcoming invasion of Normandy (Operation Overlord).

Shortly after the Normandy landings, the anticipated attacks by V-1 flying bombs (codenamed 'Divers') began, and the AA defences had to be reshuffled once more: guns were moved from the London IAZ and elsewhere to the South Coast to try to destroy the V-1s as they came inland (Operation Diver). Within 24 jours of the start of Operation Diver, 2 AA Group had placed four rows of eight-gun HAA positions in a belt 12,000 yards deep just in front of the North Downs, extending from East Grinstead to Chatham, backed by light AA (LAA) guns and radar-controlled searchlights. The belt was divided into for sectors, each with a GOR. After a fortnight, the 'Diver Belt' was reorganised, with the mobile HAA guns being replaced by static guns with better equipment, and the guns deployed nearer the coast. Moving the static guns required 2 AA Group to hire hundreds of civilian lorries, and rapidly to construct the temporary platforms required. Once 21st Army Group had broken out of the Normandy beachhead and overrun the launching sites in Northern France, the Luftwaffe switched to air-launching V-1s over the North Sea, and 2 AA Group had to reposition its defences once again, this time down the South East Coast. This offensive petered out in January 1945.

Whittaker was awarded a CB in 1943, and a CBE in 1945. He was made a substantive major-general on 11 April 1945 near the end of the war.

== Recreation ==
Whittaker listed his recreation as Rugby football. He served as honorary treasurer and president of the Kent County Rugby Football Union, as president of the London RFU, and was a member of the Rugby Football Union committee.

== Family life ==
Whittaker married Minnie B. Miles in 1919 and they had one daughter. His wife died in 1953 and in 1956 he married Brenda L. Johansen.

Whittaker died in London after a long illness on 17 February 1967.

== External sources ==
- British Military History
- Generals of World War II
