= Shivatkar (Nira) =

Nira Nira
- Census town
- Location in Maharashtra, India
- Coordinates: 18.102°N 74.214°E
- Country: India
- State: Maharashtra
- District: Pune
- Tehsil: Purandhar
- Established: 1935

Government
  - Body: GRAMPANCHAYAT

Population (2011)
  - Total: 14,560

Languages
  - Official: Marathi
- Time zone: UTC+5:30 (IST)

Nira is a census town in Pune district in the Indian state of Maharashtra. Nira is based on the river bank of Nira and is located 80 km (50 mi) from the district headquarters of Pune.

== Demographics ==
As of the 2011 Census of India, Nira had a population of 14,560. Males constitute 51% of the population and females 49%. Nira has an average literacy rate of 86%, with male literacy being 91%, and female literacy being 80%. In Nira, 11% of the population is under 6 years of age.

== Transport ==
Nira is linked by railway to Miraj and Kolhapur.
