= 26th (London) Anti-Aircraft Brigade =

- Active: 1922–1948
- Country: United Kingdom
- Branch: Territorial Army
- Type: Anti-Aircraft Brigade
- Role: Air Defence
- Part of: 1st AA Division; 1 AA Group
- Garrison/HQ: Duke of York's Headquarters
- Engagements: The Blitz; Baby Blitz; Operation Diver

Commanders
- Notable commanders: Maj-Gen Robert Whittaker

26th (London) Anti-Aircraft Brigade (26 AA Bde) was an Air Defence formation of the British Army during the Second World War. It defended London during the Blitz.

== Origin ==
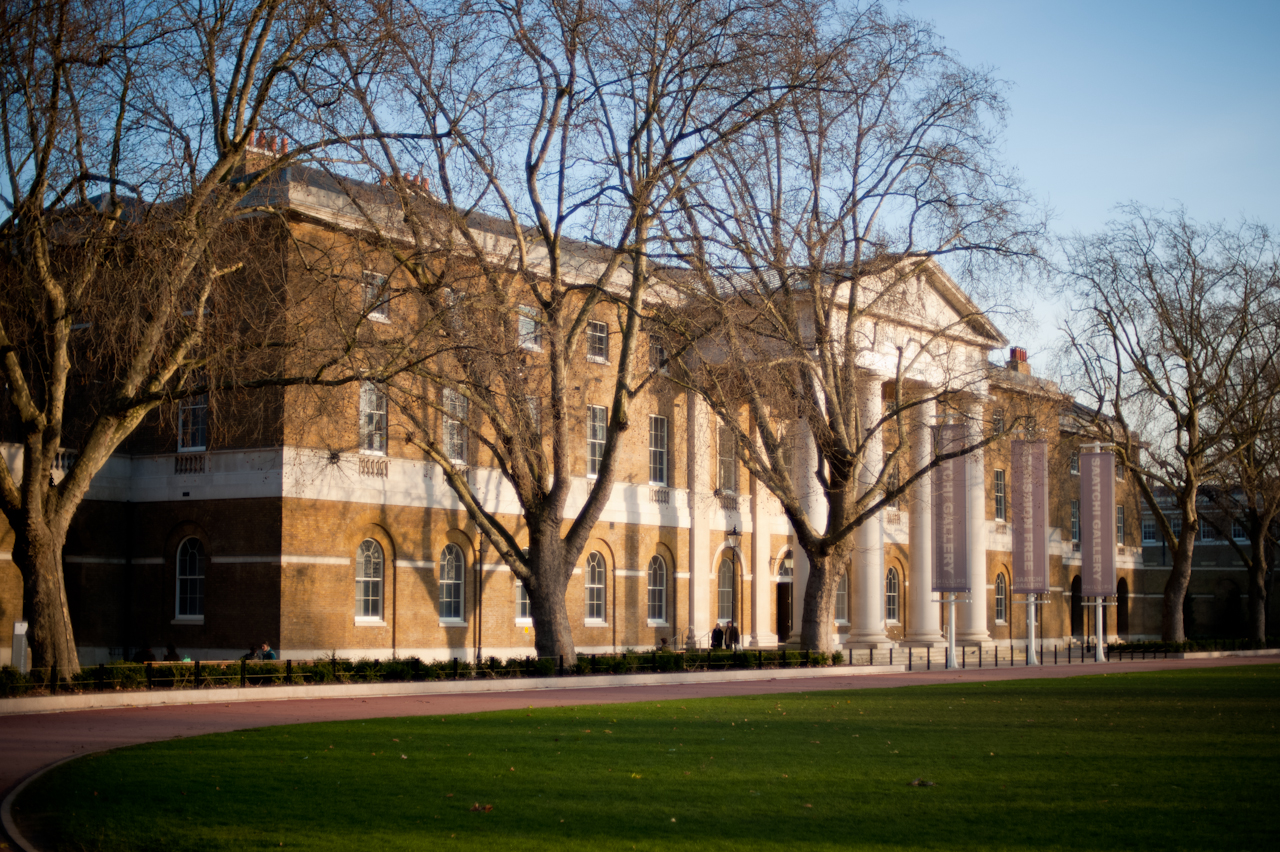
The former Duke of York's Headquarters in Chelsea, London

German air raids by Zeppelin airships and Gotha bombers on London and other British cities during the First World War had shown the need for strong anti-aircraft (AA) defences in any future war. When the Territorial Army (TA) was reformed in 1922 it included a number of dedicated AA units of the Royal Artillery (RA) and Royal Engineers (RE). Two formations were organised in London District to command these units, provisionally known as the 2nd and 3rd London Air Defence Brigades, but soon numbered 26th and 27th. Both were based at the Duke of York's Headquarters in Chelsea, where the units of the 2nd AD Bde were accommodated in buildings used before the First World War by King Edward's Horse and the Royal Army Service Corps divisional train of the 47th (1/2nd London) Division. Extra buildings erected for the units included gun drill sheds and a store for each battery. Meanwhile, 3rd AD Bde's units were based at Lytton Grove, Putney, taking over pre-war buildings previously used by the City of London Yeomanry (Rough Riders). The brigades had the following composition:.

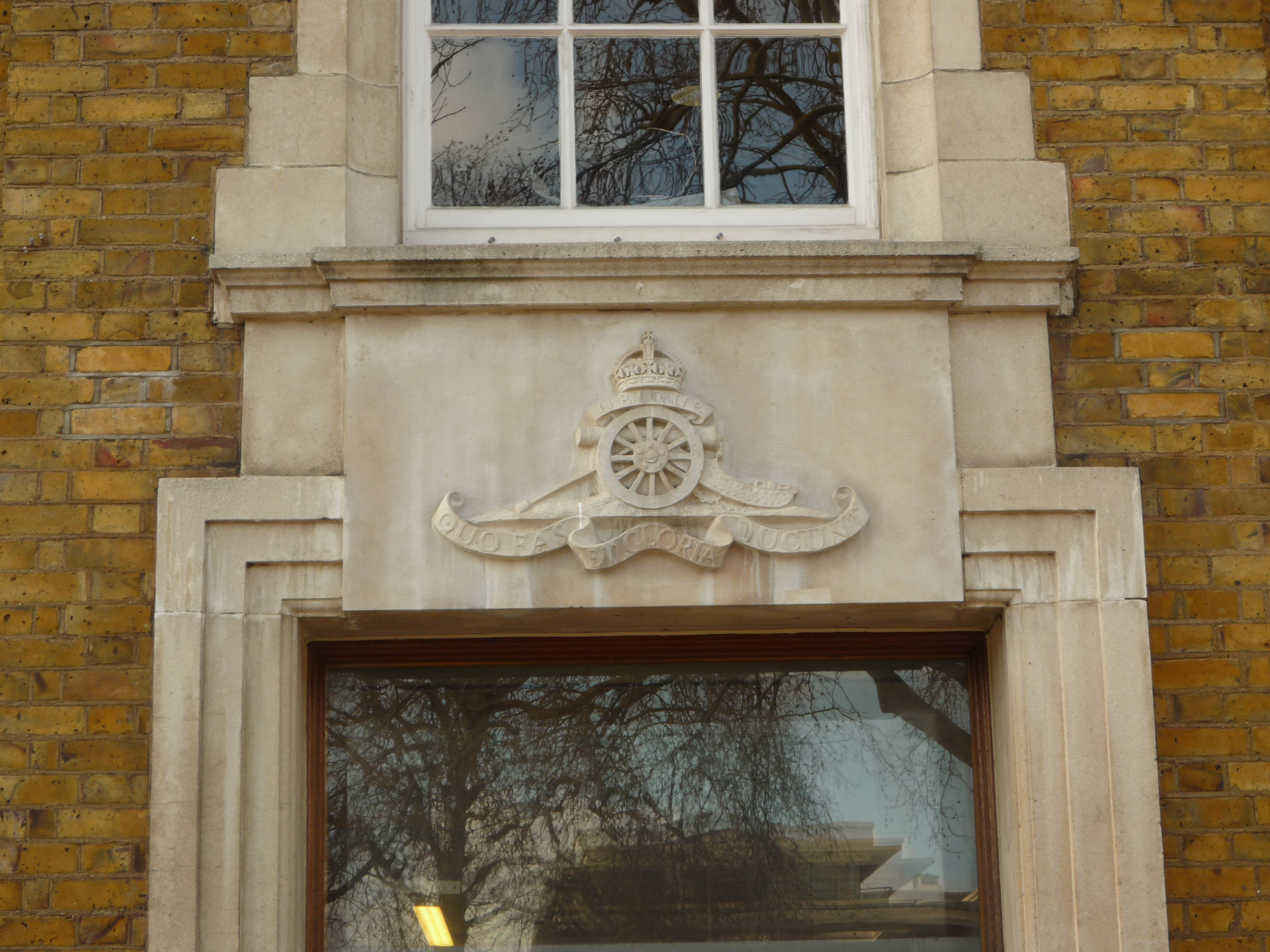
Badge of the Royal Artillery above a door at a building of the former Duke of York's Headquarters

26th (London) Air Defence Brigade

- 51st (London) Anti-Aircraft Brigade, Royal Artillery (TA) (heavy anti-aircraft (HAA) gun unit formed in 1922 at Chelsea)
  - HQ at Duke of York's Headquarters
  - 151st (London) AA Battery at Duke of York's Headquarters
  - 152nd(London) AA Battery at Duke of York's Headquarters
  - 153rd (London) AA Battery at Duke of York's Headquarters
- 52nd (London) Anti-Aircraft Brigade, RA (TA) (HAA unit formed in 1922 at Acton, London)
  - HQ at Artillery House, Acton
  - 154th (London) AA Battery at Artillery House, Acton
  - 155th (London) AA Battery at Artillery House, Acton
  - 156th (Barking) AA Battery at Empress Hall, Ripple Lane, Barking
- 26th (London) Anti-Aircraft Battalion (London Electrical Engineers), Royal Engineers (TA) (a searchlight unit)
  - HQ at Duke of York's Headquarters
  - 301st AA Company at Duke of York's Headquarters
  - 303rd AA Company at Duke of York's Headquarters
  - 321st AA Company at Duke of York's Headquarters
  - 339th AA Company at Duke of York's Headquarters
- 26th (London) Anti-Aircraft Signal Company, Royal Signals

27th (London) Air Defence Brigade

- 53rd (City of London) Anti-Aircraft Brigade, RA (TA) (HAA unit formed in 1922 at Putney), recruited mainly from men in banks and insurance companies in the City of London)
  - HQ at White City, London
  - 157th (City of London) AA Battery at White City
  - 158th (City of London) AA Battery at White City
  - 159th (Lloyd's) (City of London) AA Battery at White City
- 54th (City of London) Anti-Aircraft Brigade, RA (TA) (HAA unit formed in 1922 at Putney)
  - HQ at Putney
  - 160th (City of London) AA Battery at Putney
  - 161st (City of London) AA Battery at Putney
  - 162nd (City of London) AA Battery at Putney
- 27th (London) Anti-Aircraft Battalion (London Electrical Engineers), RE (TA) (a searchlight unit)
  - HQ at Streatham
  - 304th AA Company at Westminster
  - 305th AA Company at Westminster
  - 306th AA Company at Westminster
  - 390th AA Company at Westminster
- 27th (London) Anti-Aircraft Signal Company, Royal Corps of Signals

== 1935 Reorganisation ==
As Britain's AA defences expanded during the 1930s, higher formations became necessary. 1st AA Division was formed in 1935 at RAF Uxbridge to command the growing number of Territorial Army (TA) anti-aircraft gun and searchlight units covering London and the Home Counties. The 26th AD Bde was reorganised at Chelsea on 16 December 1935 as 26th (London) Anti-Aircraft Group, commanding all the gun and searchlight units of the two former brigades, while the 27th was reformed as 27th (Home Counties) Anti-Aircraft Group at RAF Kenley, to command new AA units in the South London suburbs.

The AA Groups took the more usual formation title of Brigades on 1 January 1939 after the Royal Artillery replaced its traditional unit designation 'Brigade' by the modern 'Regiment'.

== Mobilisation ==
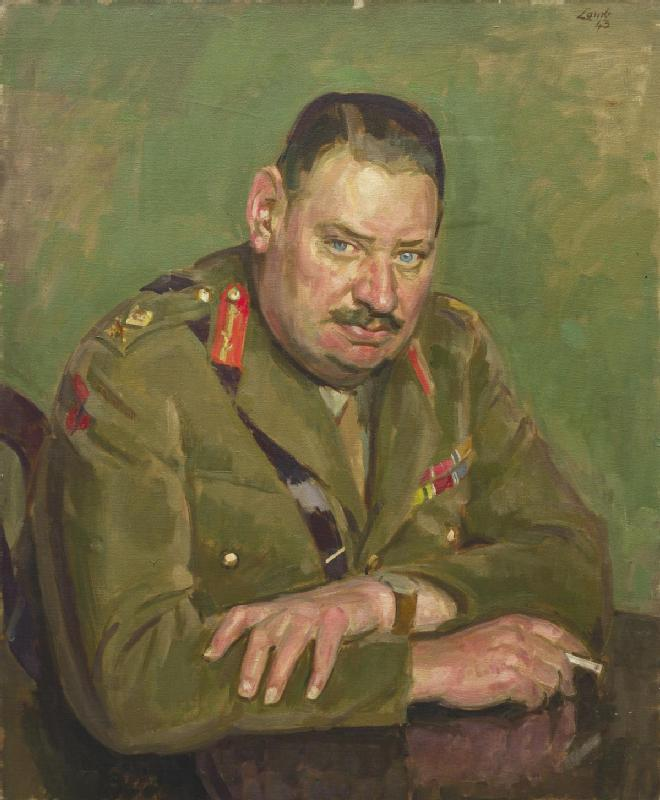
Brigadier (later Maj-Gen) Robert Whittaker, OBE, TD, commander of 26th (London) AA Brigade, 1939–40.

The TA's AA units were mobilised on 23 September 1938 during the Munich Crisis. The call-out of key parties by telephone and telegram went well, and they assembled at their drill halls within a few hours. Because the units possessed only a small scale of transport, elaborate plans had been made to requisition civilian vehicles, ranging from heavy lorries to buses and private cars. Equipment was drawn from mobilisation stores, and the detachments ferried out to their war stations. Despite some failures and problems, the emergency positions covering London were manned and most of the equipment was in place within 24 hours. The emergency mobilisation lasted nearly three weeks before the TA units were released on 14 October. Brigadier Robert Whittaker, a TA officer who had commanded 53rd (City of London) HAA Rgt, was appointed to command the brigade on 18 January 1939.

During this period of tension the Territorial Army grew enormously, and existing TA infantry battalions continued to be converted to AA regiments. The number of divisions and brigades was expanded, and the whole AA defence of the United Kingdom was taken over by Anti-Aircraft Command on 1 April 1939. A new 38th Light Anti-Aircraft Brigade was formed on 28 September 1938 by duplicating 26 AA Brigade HQ at the Duke of York's Headquarters. The new brigade took responsibility for searchlight units in the London area, leaving 26 AA Bde as a Heavy AA formation.

The further deterioration in international relations during 1939 led to a partial mobilisation in June, and a proportion of TA AA units manned their war stations under a rotation system known as 'Couverture'. Full mobilisation of AA Command came in August 1939, ahead of the declaration of war on 3 September 1939.

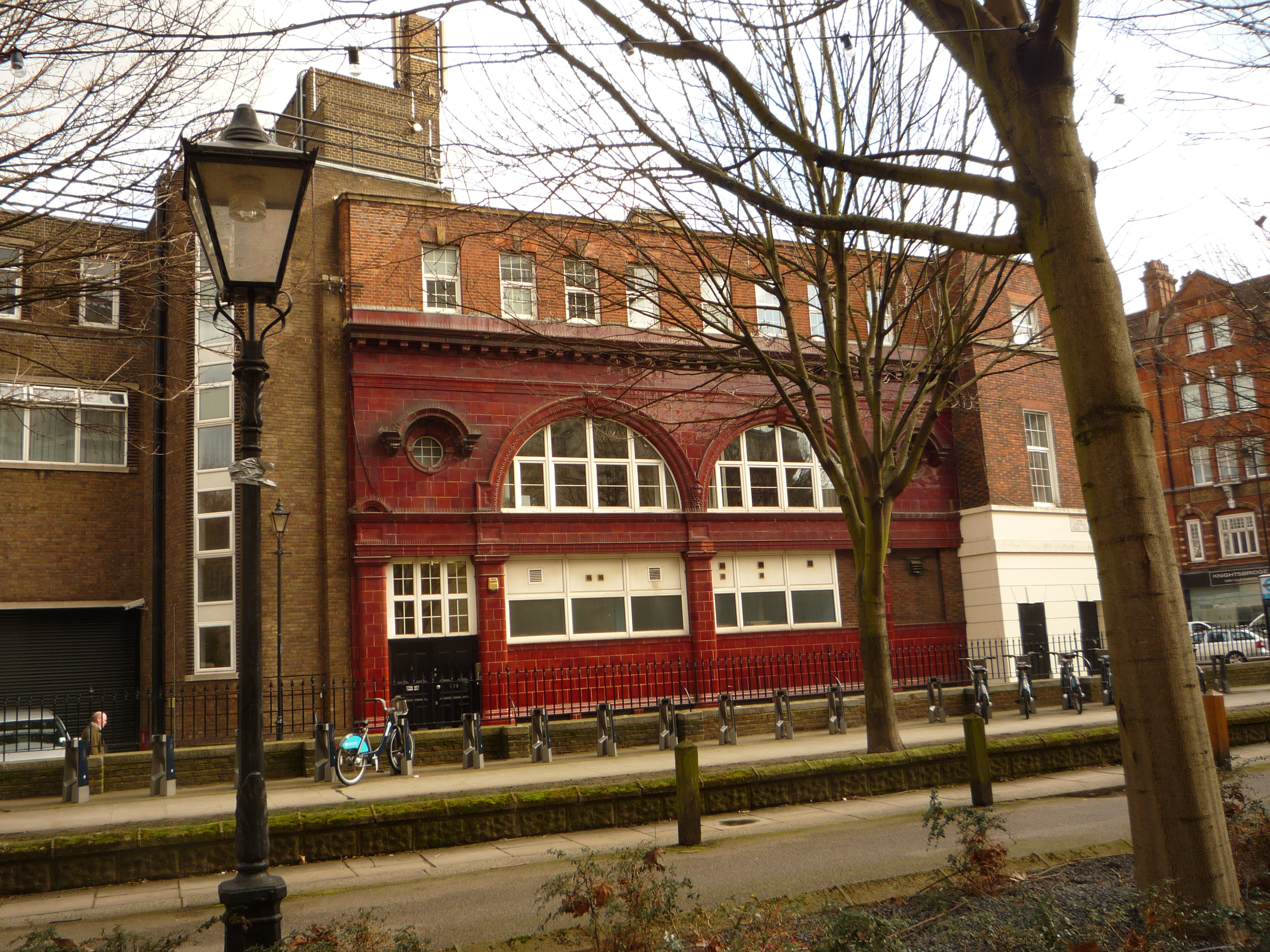
206 Brompton Road, the former Brompton Road tube station closed in 1934, used as the headquarters of the London Inner Artillery Zone anti-aircraft defences during the Second World War

Just before the outbreak of war, 26 AA Bde moved its headquarters to Brompton Road in South Kensington, where a Piccadilly line underground railway station had been disused since 1934. 1st AA Division established a control centre at Brompton Road, where the tunnels, subways and lift-shafts were adapted to provide bomb-proof accommodation for a Central Operation Room reporting direct to HQ No. 11 Group RAF at Uxbridge, and four Gun Operations Rooms (GORs) subdividing the London Inner Artillery Zone (IAZ). An elaborate network of dedicated telephone lines was laid by the General Post Office and Royal Corps of Signals, linking the AA sites, including many isolated searchlight positions. (The building remained a TA centre after the war, later being known as the Signals Drill Hall. It was sold by the Ministry of Defence in 2014.)

It had been intended that 26th AA Brigade would control the whole London IAZ, but it proved too complex for one HQ, and in September 1939 it was divided among three: 26th, 48th and 49th AA Bdes. 26th AA Brigade still had the heaviest concentration of guns, with 34 sites disposed to north and east of London, mainly equipped with static 3.7 and 4.5-inch guns. Its sites were in the process of being increased from four to eight guns each.

== Outbreak of war ==
When the UK declared war on 3 September 1939, 26 AA Bde had the following composition:

- Brigade HQ: Brompton Road, Chelsea
- 53rd (City of London) AA Regiment (went to France with the Advanced Air Striking Force October 1939)
  - HQ, 157th, 158th, 159th (Lloyd's) City of London AA Batteries as before
- 86th (Honourable Artillery Company) AA Regiment (a new unit formed in 1939 by the Honourable Artillery Company of London)
  - HQ, 273rd, 274th, 275th AA Batteries all at Armoury House, Finsbury
- 88th AA Regiment (a new unit formed in 1939 as a duplicate of 53rd HAA Rgt)
  - HQ, 281st, 282nd, 283rd AA Batteries all at White City
- 26th AA Brigade Company, Royal Army Service Corps

During 1940 the AA Regiments of the RA were redesignated Heavy Anti-Aircraft (HAA) regiments to distinguish them from the newer Light Anti-Aircraft (LAA) regiments.

== Battle of Britain ==
While the Luftwaffe attacked RAF airfields in south east England during the Battle of Britain, 26 AA Bde was hardly involved, but on 2 September 1940 a raid up the Thames Estuary reached the edge of the London IAZ and was engaged by guns of the brigade. Between 11 and 15 September, massed raids approached London, but running battles with RAF fighters broke up most of the raids before they reached the IAZ.

221 HAA Battery of 91st HAA Rgt under 39 AA Bde in the Humber Gun Zone had been nominated as a reserve battery with mobile guns. As the London Blitz got under way during September it arrived to reinforce 26 AA Bde (one gunner was killed by a bomb blast). In mid-October, half of 286/91 HAA Bty arrived in London to reinforce 221 Bty. 221 Battery moved from London to Norwich later in October.

Brigadier Whittaker was promoted to command 1st AA Division on 12 November 1940 was succeeded by Brigadier S.K. Thorburn.

== The Blitz ==
By late 1940, at the height of The Blitz, 26 AA Bde was still serving in 1 AA Division covering London, but had the following composition:

- Commander: Brigadier S.K. Thorburn (12 November 1940 – 19 February 1943)
- 4th HAA Regiment (a Regular unit returned from Dunkirk; left in June 1941 for West Africa Command and the Malta garrison)
  - 5, 6, 18 HAA Batteries
- 52nd (London) HAA Regiment (left Summer 1941 for 9th AA Division; went to Ceylon May 1942)
  - 154, 155, 271 HAA Batteries
  - 313 HAA Battery (left for West Africa with 4th HAA Rgt)
- 86th (HAC) HAA Regiment (to 49th AA Bde in 1st AA Division late 1941))
  - 273, 274 HAA Batteries
  - 275 HAA Battery (left September 1941 to join 118th HAA Rgt in Wales)
  - 383 Bty joined February 1941
  - 446 Bty joined September 1941
- 88th HAA Rgt (rejoined from 9th AA Division by May 1941, left in June 1941 for Middle East Forces)
  - 281, 282, 283 Btys
- 119th HAA Regiment (a new unit formed in December 1940)
- 62nd LAA Regiment (a new unit formed in October 1940)
  - 185, 214 Btys
  - 186 Bty (attached to 49th AA Bde until June 1941, thereafter left regiment)
  - 235 Bty (joined Summer 1941)

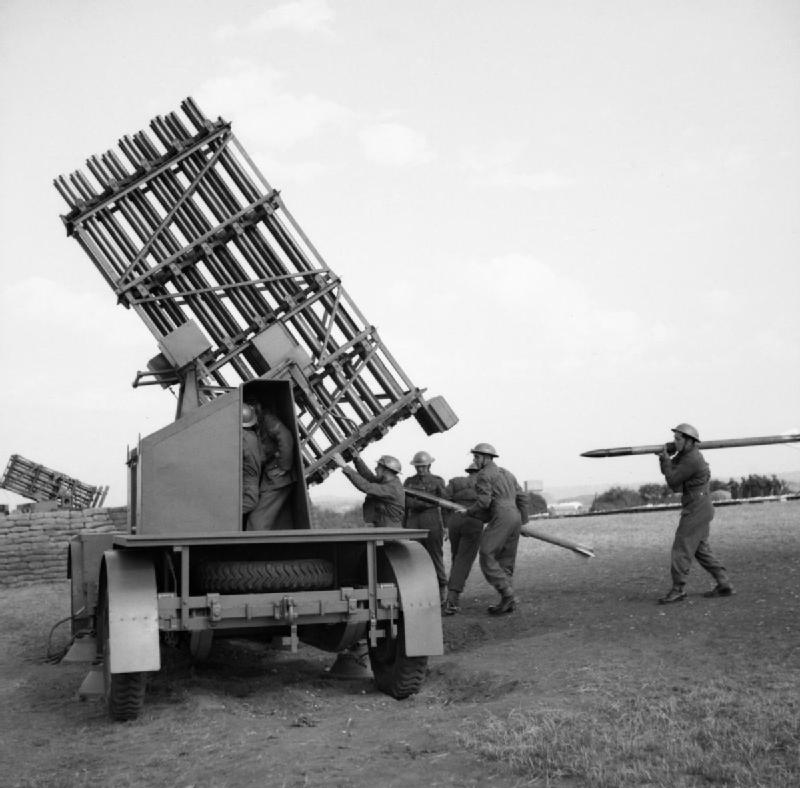
Loading a mobile Z Battery projector

Manning AA positions during the Blitz was dangerous and arduous work. A Parachute mine fell on one HAA position of 26 AA Bde in central London, killing three men and wounding 15, yet the position remained in action.

The Blitz effectively ended in May 1941, but the organisation of AA Command continued to evolve. From September 1940, rocket projectors (Z Batteries) were introduced, equipped with rocket projectiles, and during 1941 increasing numbers of women of the Auxiliary Territorial Service (ATS) took over roles in AA Command. Where they were integrated into units these were designated 'Mixed' ('M').

During 1941–42 the following further changes to 26th AA Bde's order of battle took place:

- 84th (Middlesex, London Transport) HAA Rgt (joined from 49th AA Bde Summer 1941; left Winter 1941 for 6th AA Division)
  - 260, 262, 263 Btys
- 105th HAA Regiment (joined from 48th AA Bde in 1st AA Division Summer 1941; returned Autumn 1941)
  - 326, 330, 333, 350, 435 (M) Btys
- 120th HAA Regiment (formed January 1941; joined Summer 1941)
  - 248 (Welwyn), 381, 384, 386 Btys
- 132nd (M) HAA Regiment (formed September 1941)
  - 435 (from 105th HAA Rgt), 450, 457, 469 (M) Btys
- 62nd LAA Regiment (left June 1942 for 9th AA Division)
- 6th AA Z Regiment (formed September 1940; joined Autumn 1941)
  - 128, 148, 171, 173 Btys

== Mid-war period ==
On 1 October 1942 a new organisation came into force in AA Command: corps and divisions were abolished, and brigades came under the command of new regional groups. 26th AA Brigade was subordinated to 1 AA Group covering the London IAZ. At this time its order of battle was as follows:

- 101st HAA Regiment (joined from 3rd AA Division September 1942; left December 1942 to WO Control, later sent to Burma)
  - 226, 297, 379 Btys
- 120th HAA Regiment (left Spring 1943)
  - 248, 381, 384 Btys
- 132nd (M) HAA Regiment
  - 435, 450, 457, 469 Btys
- 137th (M) HAA Regiment (joined from 4th AA Division September 1942)
  - 476, 481, 487, 574 Btys
  - 590 Bty joined early 1943)
- 156th (M) HAA Regiment (formed April 1942; joined May 1942)
  - 529 Bty (left June 1942)
  - 530, 532, 533, 535 Btys
- 6th AA Z Regiment (left November 1942)
  - 128, 148, 171, 173 Btys

There were only minor changes in the brigade's composition in 1943–44. 111th HAA Regiment (347, 355, 356 and 389 Btys) joined early in 1943, but left in May 1943 to go to GHQ Reserve, later 21st Army Group, preparing for the invasion of Normandy (Operation Overlord).

By October 1944, the brigade's HQ establishment was 9 officers, 8 male other ranks and 23 members of the ATS, together with a small number of attached drivers, cooks and mess orderlies (male and female). In addition, the brigade had a Mixed Signal Office Section of 1 officer, 5 male other ranks and 19 ATS, which was formally part of the Group signal unit.

== Operation Diver ==
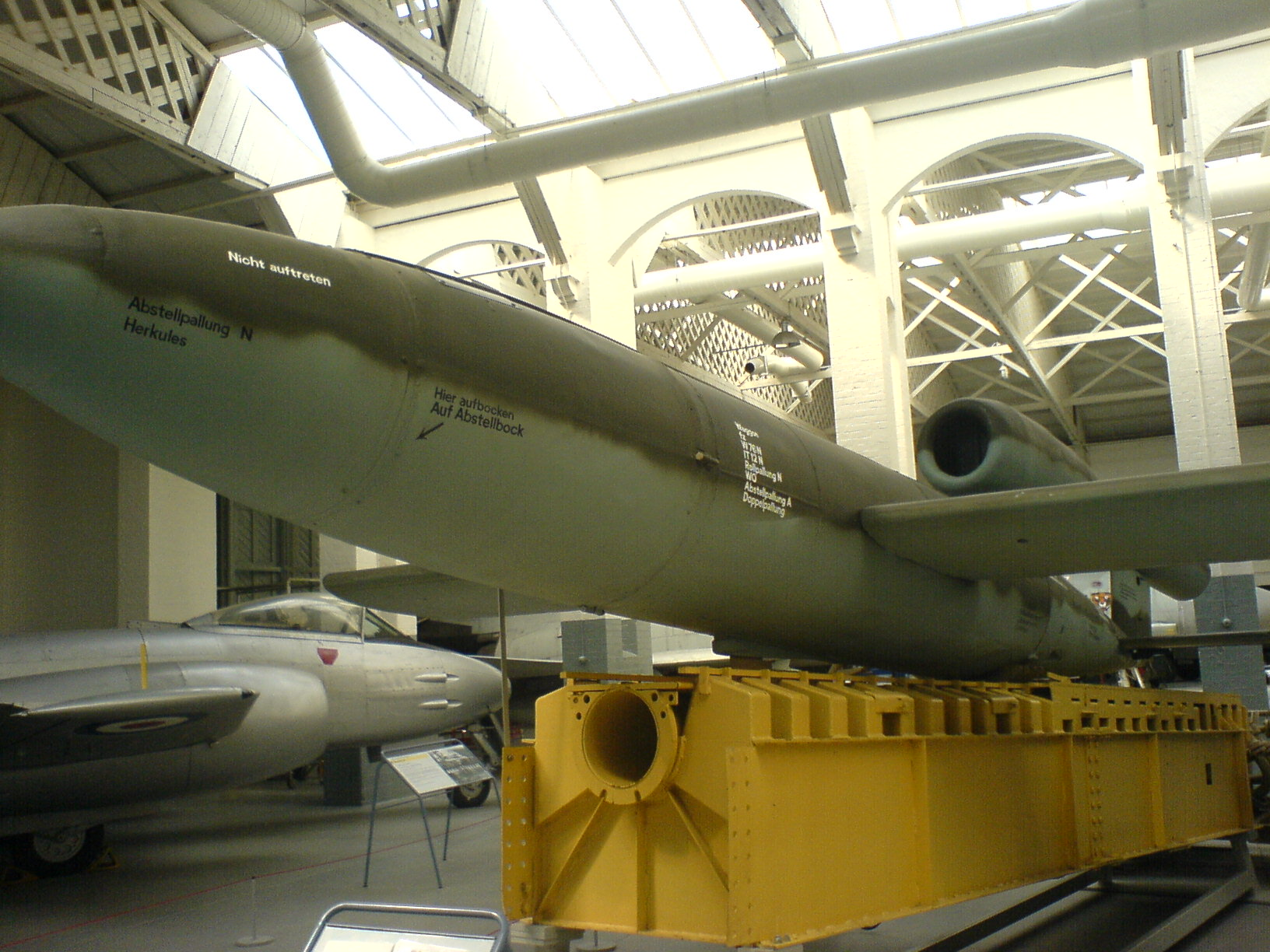
A V-1 and launching ramp section on display at the Imperial War Museum Duxford

The Luftwaffe began a new bombing campaign against London in early 1944 (the Baby Blitz). By now the night fighter defences and the London IAZ were well organised and the attackers suffered heavy losses for relatively small results. More significant were the V-1 flying bombs, codenamed 'Divers', which began to be launched against London from Northern France soon after D-Day. V-1s (known to Londoners as 'Doodlebugs') presented AA Command's biggest challenge since the Blitz. Defences had been planned against this new form of attack (Operation Diver), but it presented a severe problem for AA guns, and after two weeks' experience AA Command carried out a major reorganisation, stripping guns from the London IAZ and other parts of the UK and repositioning them along the South Coast to target V-1s coming in over the English Channel, where a 'downed' V-1 would cause no damage. As the launching sites were overrun by 21st Army Group, the Luftwaffe switched to air-launching V-1s over the North Sea, so 1 AA Group had to redeploy again to the east of London.

Once 21st Army Group had captured Brussels and Antwerp, these cities became targets for V-1s launched from within Germany, and anti-Diver defences had to be established. 132nd and 137th (M) HAA Regiments from 26th AA Bde were among the reinforcements sent to Brussels in January 1945 for this duty.

== Postwar ==
After VE-day, demobilisation of AA units began promptly. 132nd and 137th (M) HAA regiments were disbanded in Europe (in May and October 1945 respectively) and did not return to 26th AA Bde. By November 1945 the brigade had the following composition:

- 12th HAA Regiment
  - 4, 18, 360 Btys
- 153rd (M) HAA Regiment (dropped the (M) designation August 1945)
  - 509, 513, 521 Btys
- 156th (M) HAA
  - 530, 532, 533 Btys
- 162nd (M) HAA Regiment (dropped the (M) designation March 1946)
  - 449, 480, 528 Btys

All these regiments were disbanded in January 1947 except 12th HAA Rgt which was retained in the postwar Regular Army.

Brigade HQ moved to Whetstone on 11 April 1946. When the TA was reformed on 1 January 1947, the brigade's Regular Army units reformed 6 AA Bde at Grays, Essex, while the TA portion was renumbered as 52 (London) AA Brigade, based at Chingford, Essex, in 1 AA Group. (The wartime 52 AA Bde in Scotland was renumbered as 78 AA Bde in the 1947 reorganisation.) 52 (London) Brigade had the following organisation:

- 459 (The Essex Regiment) (Mixed) HAA Regiment
- 482 (Mixed) HAA Regiment (Essex)
- 599 (Mobile) HAA Regiment (Essex Regiment)
- 609 (Mixed) HAA Regiment (Tottenham)
- 512 (Finsbury Rifles) LAA Regiment
- 568 (St Pancras) Searchlight Regiment

However, the brigade was disbanded in September 1948.

== External sources ==
- British Army Units 1945 onwards (archive site)
- British Military History
- Patriot Files Orders of Battle
- Royal Artillery 1939–1945
- Orders of Battle
