= 54th (City of London) Heavy Anti-Aircraft Regiment, Royal Artillery =

54th (City of London) HAA Regiment, RA 454 (City of London) HAA Regiment, RA
- Cap Badge of the Royal Artillery (pre-1953)
- Active: July 1923–1 January 1954
- Country: United Kingdom
- Branch: Territorial Army
- Role: Air Defence
- Size: Regiment
- Garrison/HQ: Putney
- Engagements: The Blitz

54th (City of London) Heavy Anti-Aircraft Regiment was a volunteer air defence unit of Britain's Territorial Army from 1922 until 1954. In World War II it defended London during The Blitz and later served in the Middle East.

== Origin ==
German air raids by Zeppelin airships and Gotha bombers on London and other British cities during World War I had shown the need for strong anti-aircraft (AA) defences in any future war. When the Territorial Army (TA) was reformed in 1922 it included a number of dedicated AA units of the Royal Garrison Artillery (RGA). The fourth of these was 54th (London) Anti-Aircraft Brigade, RGA, (TA), comprising 160th, 161st and 162nd (City of London) AA Batteries, formed in July 1923 and headquartered in Putney. It was assigned to 27th (London) Air Defence Brigade.

As Britain's AA defences expanded during the 1930s, higher formations became necessary. 1st AA Division was formed to cover London and the Home Counties in 1935, and the 54th AA Brigade was reassigned to 26th (London) AA Group within the division. The Royal Garrison Artillery had been absorbed into the Royal Artillery (RA) in 1924; on 1 January 1939 the RA replaced its traditional unit designation 'Brigade' by the modern 'Regiment', which allowed the 'AA Groups' to take the more usual formation title of 'Brigades'.

== World War II ==
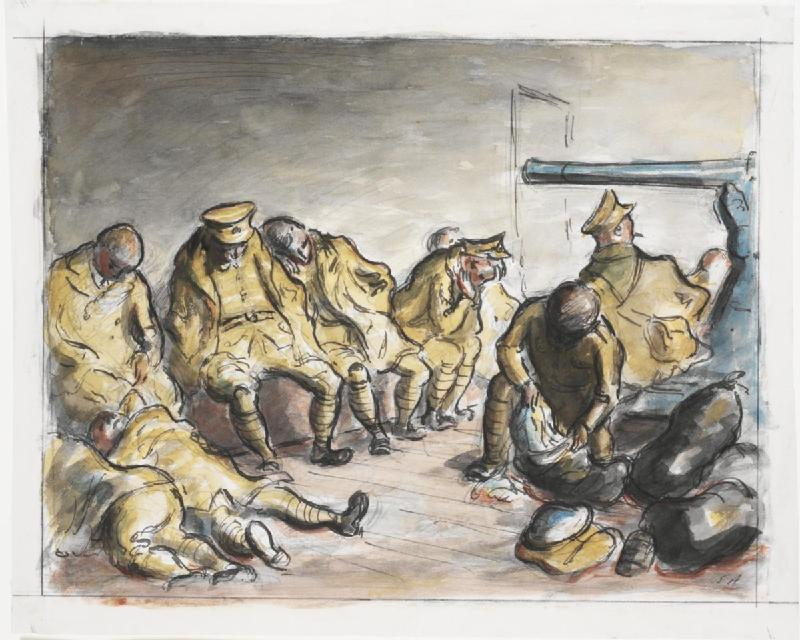
Edward Ardizzone recorded the early days of mobilisation at 54th HAA Regiment's drill hall at Putney

=== Mobilisation ===
The TA's AA units were mobilised on 23 September 1938 during the Munich Crisis, with units manning their emergency positions within 24 hours, even though many did not yet have their full complement of men or equipment. The emergency lasted three weeks, and they were stood down on 13 October. 54th AA Regiment formed an additional battery, No 312, at Putney on 1 April 1939, as part of the expansion of the TA following the Munich Crisis.

In February 1939 the existing AA defences came under the control of a new Anti-Aircraft Command. In June, as the international situation worsened, a partial mobilisation of the TA was begun in a process known as 'couverture', whereby each AA unit did a month's tour of duty in rotation to man selected AA gun and searchlight positions. On 24 August, ahead of the declaration of war, AA Command was fully mobilised at its war stations.

After mobilisation, a new 48th AA Bde was formed in South London on 28 August 1939, to which 54 (CoL) AA Regt was assigned.

=== Battle of Britain and Blitz ===
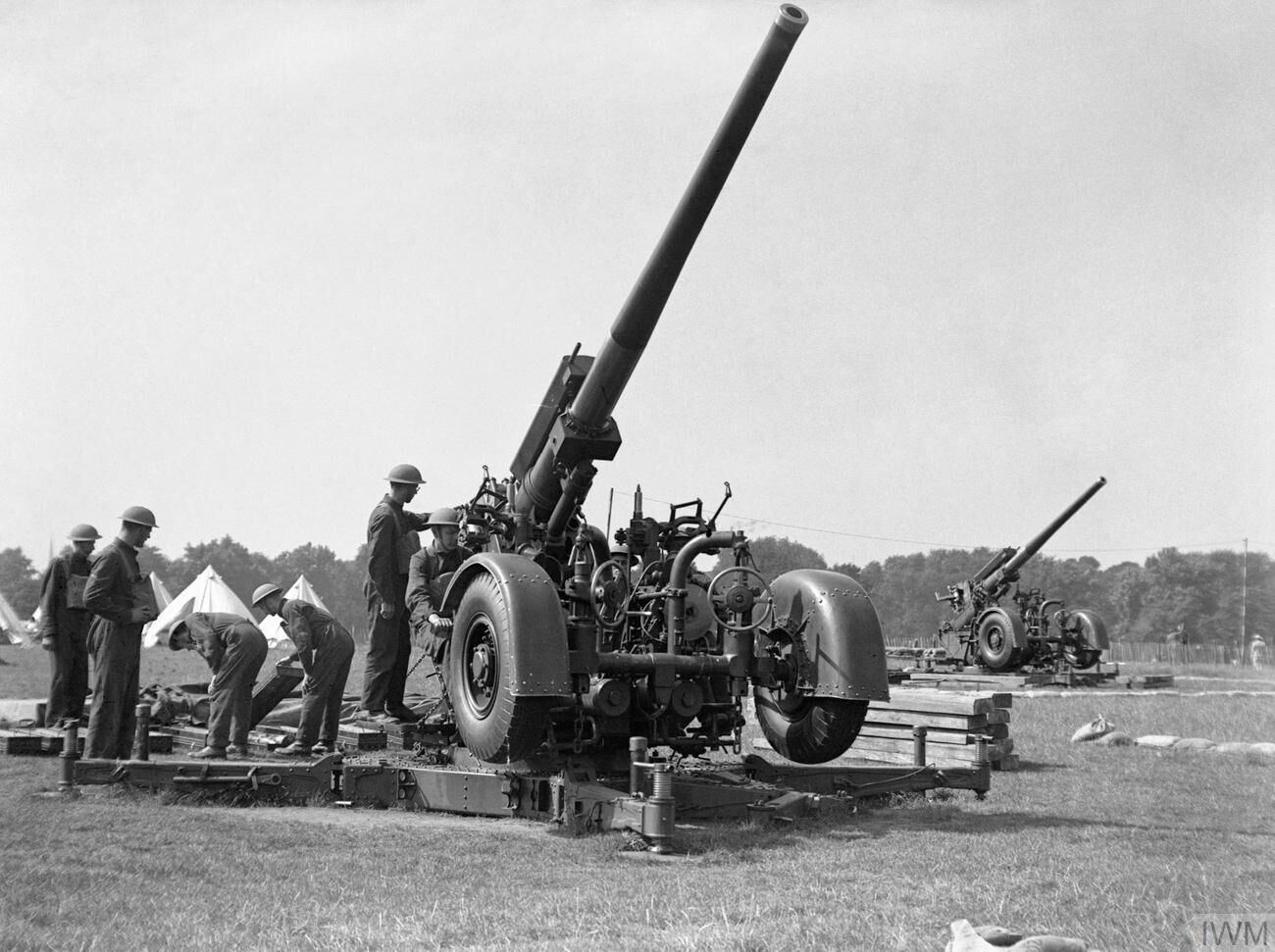
Mobile 3.7-inch AA guns in London's Hyde Park, 1939

In May 1940 the regiment was deployed manning 4.5-inch guns at sites in South East London:

- 160 AA Bty at Welling (site ZS6)
- 161 AA Bty at Woolwich (ZS8)
- 312 AA Bty at Dulwich (ZS14) and Clapham (ZS16), with Battery HQ (BHQ) at 'Woodhall' in College Road, Dulwich

On 1 May 1940, detachments of the newly-formed 318 AA Bty of 99th (London Welsh) AA Rgt were sent to these sites for training on 4.5-inch guns, and then on 15 May, 318 AA Bty took over BHQ and sites ZS14 and ZS16 from 312 AA Bty. At the same time 162 AA Bty concentrated at Eltham (ZS7).

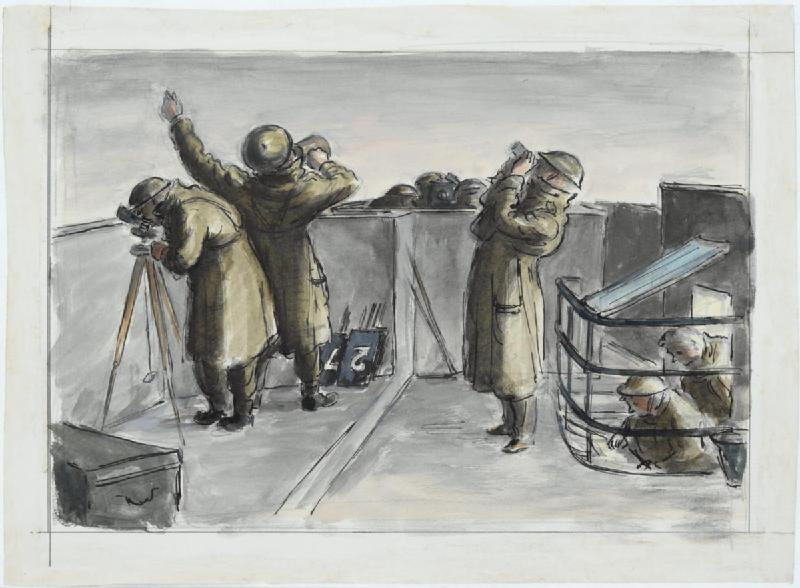
An AA command post in action, by Ardizzone

On 1 June 1940, along with other AA units equipped with 3-inch, 3.7-inch or 4.5-inch AA guns, the 54th was designated a Heavy AA Regiment. It continued to serve with 48 AA Bde in 1 AA Division defending London during the Blitz

The regiment sent a cadre to 205th Training Regiment at Aborfield to provide the basis for a new 428 Bty; this was formed on 8 May 1941 and joined the regiment on 6 August 1941. It replaced 162 Bty, which had left to join a new 127th HAA Rgt forming at Cobham, Surrey. On 29 December 1941 428 Bty transferred to 131st HAA Rgt.

=== Indian Ocean and Middle East ===
In 1942 the regiment sailed to the Indian Ocean. 162 (City of London) Battery went to East Africa Command, where it later formed part of a composite 'F' Regiment. The rest of the regiment went to Ceylon, where by September 1942, 160 and 161 (City of London) Batteries had been joined by 159 (Lloyd's, City of London) Battery from 53 (City of London) HAA Regiment. 159 Battery later moved on to 52 (London) HAA Regiment and took part in the Burma Campaign 1944–45.

In May 1943, 54 HAA Regiment moved to Egypt, where it came under the non-operational 8th AA Bde in Middle East Forces. 312 Battery moved up and came under 89th HAA Rgt/AA Defence Command at Benghazi but the rest of the regiment remained in Egypt until it was placed in suspended animation on 27 February 1945.

== Postwar ==
When the TA was reformed in 1947, the regiment was reconstituted as 454 HAA Regiment (City of London), RA, TA based at Lytton Grove, Putney, as part of 67 AA Bde.

On 1 January 1954 the regiment was merged into 452 (London) HAA based at Acton.

== Honorary Colonel ==
The following officer served as Honorary Colonel of the regiment:

- Capt Sir Benjamin Lazarus Hansford, KCB, TD (1863–1954), 1928–47

== Prominent members ==
On 1 September 1939 the artist Edward Ardizzone was mobilised at Putney with 54th HAA Regiment. By December he was a Bombardier with F Troop of 162 Bty. He was commissioned as a 2nd Lieutenant on 23 December, leaving the artillery and becoming an official war artist in February 1940.
