= 52nd (London) Heavy Anti-Aircraft Regiment, Royal Artillery =

52nd (London) Heavy Anti-Aircraft Regiment
- Cap Badge of the Royal Artillery (pre-1953)
- Active: 1922–1961
- Country: United Kingdom
- Branch: Territorial Army
- Role: Air Defence
- Size: Regiment
- Garrison/HQ: Duke of York's Headquarters, Chelsea, Ripple Lane Acton
- Engagements: The Blitz; Burma Campaign 1944–1945

52nd (London) Heavy Anti-Aircraft Regiment was a volunteer air defence unit of Britain's Territorial Army from 1922 until 1961. In World War II it defended London during The Blitz and later served in the Burma Campaign.

== Origin ==
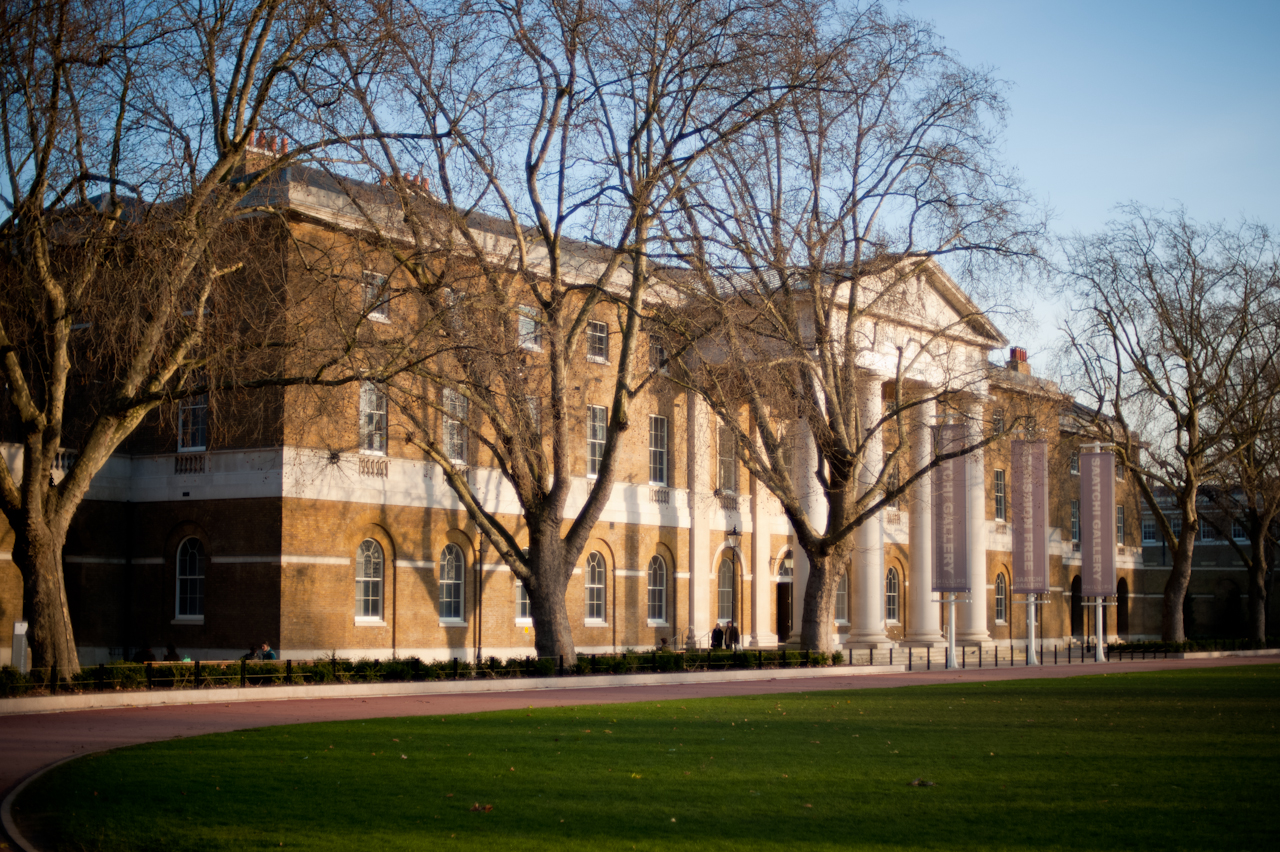
The Duke of York's Headquarters

German air raids by Zeppelin airships and Gotha bombers on London and other British cities during World War I had shown the need for strong anti-aircraft (AA) defences in any future war. When the Territorial Army (TA) was reformed in 1922 it included a number of dedicated AA units of the Royal Artillery (RA). The second of these was 52nd (London) Anti-Aircraft Brigade, Royal Field Artillery (RFA), formed on 16 October 1922 and comprising 154th, 155th and 156th (London) AA Batteries. The Regimental Headquarters, 154 and 155 Batteries were at the Duke of York's Headquarters in Chelsea, London, while 156 Battery was based at Empress Hall, Ripple Lane, Barking. On 8 February 1923, the regiment was transferred to the Royal Garrison Artillery (RGA), which had provided the AA batteries in World War I. However, on 1 June 1924, the RGA and RFA merged to become simply the Royal Artillery (RA). 156th (London) Bty was redesignated 156th (Barking) Bty in February 1926. It formed part of 26th (London) Air Defence Brigade also headquartered at the Duke of York's Headquarters. The original TA AA units were formed on a low peacetime establishment with a few old 3-inch guns on static mounts.

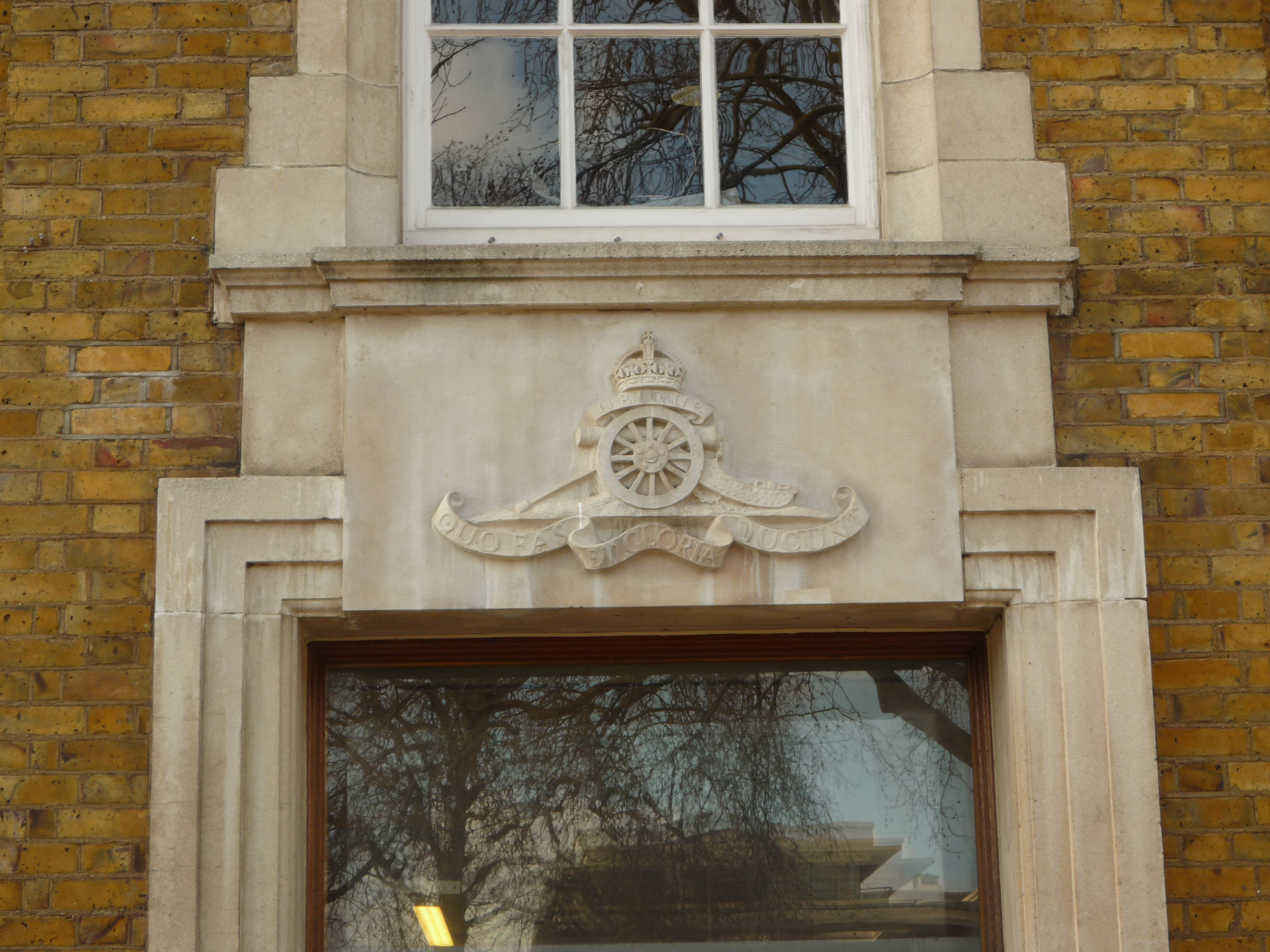
Badge of the Royal Artillery above a door at a building of the former Duke of York's Headquarters in Chelsea, London

As Britain's AA defences expanded during the 1930s, higher formations became necessary, and the 26th AD Bde (now renamed 26th (London) AA Group), including 52nd AA Bde, was assigned to 1st AA Division organised to cover London and the Home Counties. The Royal Garrison Artillery had been absorbed into the Royal Artillery (RA) in 1924; on 1 January 1938, the RA replaced its traditional unit designation 'Brigade' by the modern 'Regiment', and the 'AA Groups' reverted to the more usual formation title of 'Brigades'. Anti-Aircraft Command was formed in April 1939 to control all the TA's AA units and formations.

By 1938, RHQ, 154 and 155 Batteries had moved from Chelsea to Artillery House, Horn Lane, in Acton, and were joined on 1 November 1938 by a new 271 (Brentford) AA Battery, replacing 156 (Barking) AA Battery, which had become part of a new 82nd (Essex) AA Regiment.

== Mobilisation ==
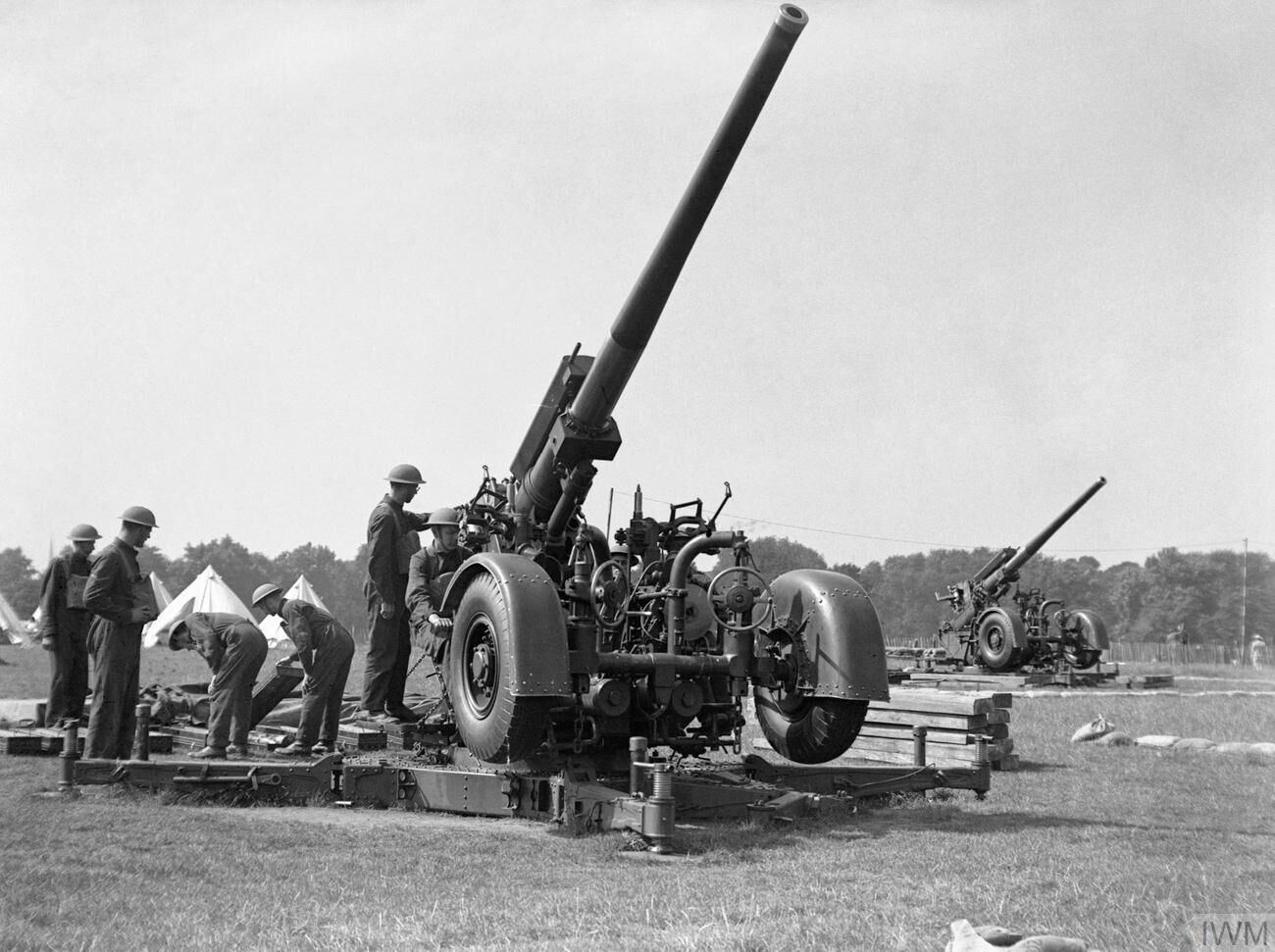
3.7 inch gun in London in 1939.

The TA's AA units were mobilised on 23 September 1938 during the Munich Crisis. The call-out of key parties by telephone and telegram went well, and they assembled at their drill halls within a few hours. Because the units possessed only a small scale of transport, elaborate plans had been made to requisition civilian vehicles, ranging from heavy lorries to buses and private cars. Equipment was drawn from mobilisation stores, and the detachments ferried out to their war stations. Despite some failures and problems, the emergency positions covering London were manned and most of the equipment was in place within 24 hours. The emergency mobilisation lasted nearly three weeks before the TA units were released on 14 October. The TA was doubled in size after the Munich Crisis, and 313 AA Battery was formed at Brentford and joined the regiment in April 1939.

The deterioration in international relations during 1939 led to a partial mobilisation in June, and a proportion of TA AA units manned their war stations under a rotation system known as 'Couverture'. Full mobilisation of AA Command came on 28 August 1939, ahead of the declaration of war on 3 September 1939.

== World War II ==
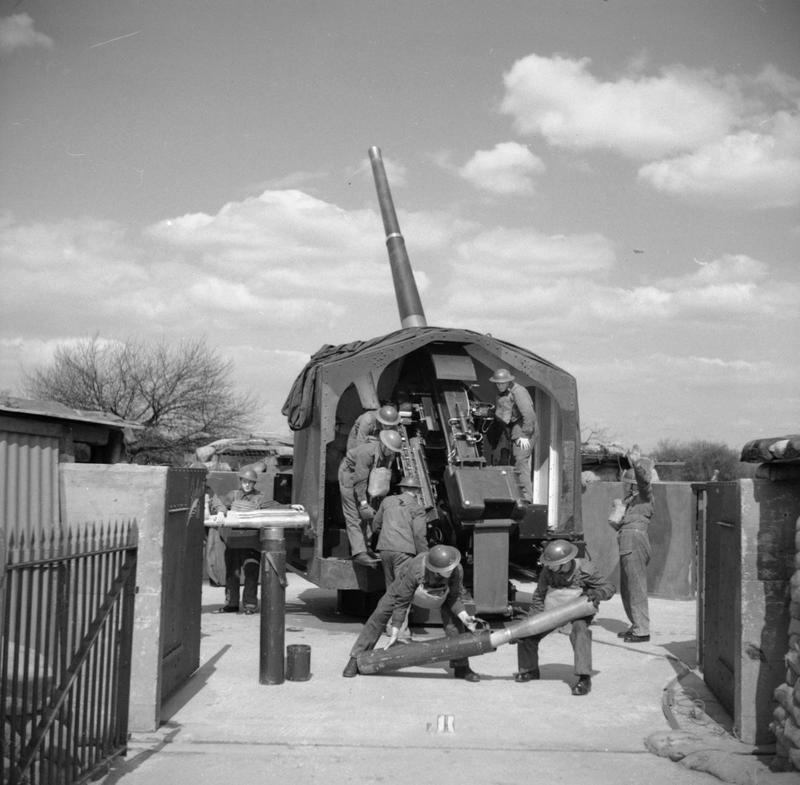
4.5-inch gun and crew of 52nd HAA Rgt, London, April 1941

On mobilisation, 52 AA Regiment was assigned to a newly formed 49 AA Bde in London. 313 AA Battery later served with the Regular 4 HAA Rgt in West Africa

=== The Blitz ===
On 1 June 1940, along with other AA units equipped with the older 3-inch and newer 3.7-inch and 4.5-inch AA guns, the 52nd was designated a Heavy AA Regiment. By the time of the Battle of Britain and during The Blitz, 52 HAA Regt had returned to 26 AA Bde in 1 AA Division, defending London.

The regiment sent a cadre to 205th HAA Training Regiment at Arborfield to provide the basis for a new 424 HAA Bty; this was formed on 24 April 1941 and joined the regiment on 22 July 1941. It had previously sent a cadre to 207th HAA Training Rgt at Devizes, which had formed 385 HAA Bty on 14 November 1940 for 121st HAA Rgt. The regiment sent a third cadre to 209th HAA Training Regiment at Blandford to form 485 (Mixed) Bty on 25 September 1941, which joined 139th (Mixed) HAA Rgt. ('Mixed' units included women of the Auxiliary Territorial Service (ATS)).

=== South Wales ===
The Blitz ended in May 1941, and in the summer the regiment moved to South Wales, where it joined 61 AA Bde in 9 AA Division. Two sections of 154 HAA Bty were detached under command of 79 (Hertfordshire Yeomanry) HAA Rgt in the Swansea Gun Defence Area. These manned four 3.7-inch mobile guns at Port Talbot (August) and later at Briton Ferry (December). On 17 December 1941, 424 Bty transferred to 138th HAA Rgt. 313 Bty had already left to join 4th HAA Rgt West African Artillery, with which it fought in Burma. In January 1942, 52 HAA Rgt transferred to 5 AA Bde, still in 9 AA Division.

=== Ceylon ===
The regiment remained with 9 AA Division until March 1942, when it joined the War Office Reserve and then embarked for Ceylon, arriving at Colombo on 28 May and moving to Trincomalee a month later. 154 (London) Battery was stationed with East Africa Command in November 1942, and 29 March 1943 joined 56 (Cornwall) HAA Regt in Ceylon. In its place, 52 HAA Regt received 159 (Lloyds) Battery from 53 (City of London) HAA Regt. 52 HAA Regt came under the command of 23 AA Bde, while 155 and 271 Btys were at different times detached to 24 AA Bde

=== Burma ===
On 23 November 1944, 52 HAA Regt embarked again and crossed to India to take part in the reconquest of Burma. It spent the whole of December travelling to Palel in Manipur on the Burmese border, where it came under XXXIII Corps in Fourteenth Army to join in the advance across the Chindwin River.

Assigned to 11th (East Africa) Division, it moved east from Imphal to Tamu and down the 'pestilential' Kabaw Valley to the Chindwin to meet 5th (Indian) Division at Kalemyo. 11th EA Division with its AA support then moved north up the Chindwin to Kalewa, an important ferry centre which was to be the crossing site for XXXIII Corps. A bridgehead was secured and the engineers began building a 1,100-foot Bailey bridge on pontoons. Japanese air attacks had been slight up to this point, but now their aircraft made a determined attempt to knock out the bridge. Intense concentrations of fire by 52nd and the other AA units broke up the attacks, destroyed six aircraft, and ensured that the bridge remained intact.

As XXXIII Corps launched its main drive from Kalewa in December, 52 HAA Rgt remained behind to defend the bridgehead area, later moving up to guard the line of communications as the Corps advanced towards Mandalay in January 1945. During the approach to Mandalay, the Corps HAA guns were frequently used as Corps medium artillery, bombarding enemy positions. Late in 1944, 52nd HAA Rgt had acquired a section of 7.2-inch howitzers to operate in this role, for which it had to find the detachments, command posts and observation post parties for this unfamiliar duty.

The important airfield at Meiktila was captured by IV Corps on 20 February and turned into a defended 'box' against enemy counter-attacks, and 52nd HAA Rgt was transferred from XXXIII to IV Corps, with 271 Bty moving in to reinforce the box.

As the British advance gained momentum, IV Corps' two divisions, 5th and 17th (Indian), began leap-frogging forwards. 155 and 271 Batteries of 52nd HAA Rgt accompanied 5th Division, while 159 Bty went with 17th Division. The HAA guns were mainly used in the ground role, but when the advance reached Payagyi and Pegu, only 70 miles from Rangoon, the airfield complex and the bridge over the Sittang River required AA cover, for which 271 Bty was deployed against small and scattered air raids.

When Rangoon fell in early May, 24th AA Bde took over responsibility for its air defence, and 52nd HAA Rgt deployed its 24 3.7-inch guns to defend the docks, airfield and oil installations. It remained there when 24 AA Bde was replaced by 3 Indian AA Bde in June. The AA defence role at Rangoon ended in September 1945 and 52nd HAA Rgt was withdrawn. All the British regiments were on their way home by October.

The regiment's former 154 (London) HAA Battery had been converted into Medium Artillery (as part of 63 Medium Battery) in July 1944 and assigned to 87 Medium Regt. It remained in Burma when the rest of 87 Medium Regt returned to India and, on 17 August 1945, it rejoined 52 HAA Regt. It was apparently placed in suspended animation by 1946; the whole regiment with 155, 159 and 271 Btys followed it into suspended animation in the UK on 17 February 1946, completing the process by 10 March.

== Postwar ==
The regiment was reconstituted in the TA in 1947 as 452 (London) HAA Regiment at Acton in 67 AA Bde (the prewar 41 AA Bde). In 1954, it absorbed 454 (City of London) HAA Regiment, and the following year it was amalgamated with 453/488 (City of London) and 497 (Hammersmith) HAA Regiments in 33 AA Bde. The combined regiment retained the number 452, with the following organisation:

- RHQ Battery – from 453/488 HAA
- P (Middlesex) Battery – from 452 HAA
- Q (Lloyds City of London Battery) – from 454 HAA
- R (Hammersmith) Battery – from 497 HAA

In 1961, the regiment was amalgamated again, this time with 264 (7th London) Field Regiment, 290 (City of London) Field Regiment and 353 (London) Medium Regiment to form 254 (City of London) Field Regiment, when the 52nd Anti-Aircraft lineage ended.

== Honorary Colonel ==
The motor manufacturer and philanthropist William Morris, 1st Viscount Nuffield was appointed Honorary Colonel of 52 (London) AA Regiment on 4 June 1937 and continued that role with 452 HAA Regiment.
