= 38th Light Anti-Aircraft Brigade =

38th Light Anti-Aircraft Brigade 64 Anti-Aircraft Brigade
- Active: 28 September 1938 – 31 October 1955
- Country: United Kingdom
- Branch: Territorial Army
- Type: Anti-Aircraft Brigade
- Role: Air Defence
- Part of: 1st AA Division; 1 AA Group; 2 AA Group; 6 AA Group
- Garrison/HQ: Duke of York's Headquarters
- Engagements: The Blitz

The 38th Light Anti-Aircraft Brigade (38 AA Bde) was an air defence formation of Britain's Territorial Army formed just before the Second World War, which protected London and Southern England during the Blitz and later converted into an infantry formation for the liberation of Europe.

== Origins ==
The brigade headquarters was formed on 28 September 1938 by duplicating the 26th (London) Anti-Aircraft Brigade at the Duke of York's Headquarters in Chelsea, London, as part of the expansion of Britain's Anti-Aircraft (AA) defences before the Second World War. The brigade was composed of searchlight units of the Royal Artillery (RA) and Royal Engineers (RE) and formed part of 1st AA Division, which came under Anti-Aircraft Command the following year. The first brigade commander was Brigadier W.T.O. Crewdson (appointed 28 September 1938).

== Mobilisation ==
The deterioration in international relations during 1939 led to a partial mobilisation of the TA in June, after which a proportion of TA AA units manned their war stations under a rotation system known as 'Couverture'. Full mobilisation of AA Command came in August 1939, ahead of the declaration of war on 3 September 1939. At this time the brigade had the following order of battle:

- 26th (London) Anti-Aircraft Battalion (London Electrical Engineers), RE (TA) – from 26 AA Bde
  - HQ, 303, 321 and 339 AA Companies at Duke of York's HQ, Chelsea
  - 301 Company at Shepherd's Bush
- 27th (London) Anti-Aircraft Battalion (London Electrical Engineers), RE (TA) – from 26 AA Bde
  - HQ at Streatham
  - 304, 305, 306 and 390 AA Companies at Westminster
- 75th (Middlesex) Searchlight Regiment, RA (TA) – formed May 1939
  - HQ and 470, 471, 472 and 473 S/L Batteries at Cowley, London
- 38th AA Brigade Company, Royal Army Service Corps

== Blitz ==
90 cm Projector Anti-Aircraft, displayed at Fort Nelson, Portsmouth

In August 1940, the Royal Engineers AA battalions were transferred to the Royal Artillery and were termed Searchlight Regiments. By now, the 27th (London Electrical Engineers) had been transferred to 47 AA Bde covering Southampton, and had been exchanged with 35th (1st Surrey Rifles) Searchlight Regiment, Royal Artillery. In October, 38 AA Bde was joined by the newly raised 79th Searchlight Regiment, Royal Artillery.

During the Blitz of 1940–41, 38 Light AA Bde provided the searchlight component of 1 AA Division, directing the Heavy (HAA) and Light (LAA) anti-aircraft guns defending London. 1st AA Division had established a control centre at the disused Brompton Road tube station, with an elaborate network of dedicated telephone lines linking the AA sites across the Inner Artillery Zone (IAZ), including many isolated searchlight positions. The London IAZ extended from Cheshunt and Dagenham in the east to Bexley and Mitcham in the south and to Richmond and Northolt in the west, with three brigades of guns deployed. Superimposed across the IAZ were the 73 searchlight sites controlled by 38th AA Bde.

In the absence of inland radar coverage, 1st AA Division's Chief Signals Officer, Lt-Col G.C. Wickens, devised a system of 14 fixed base-lines of sound locators to detect night raids approaching the IAZ. These were linked by automatic telephone equipment to the Brompton operations room, where the angular plots were resolved to indicate grid squares where the HAA guns in range could fire an unseen barrage. Detachments of 75th Searchlight Regiment from 38th AA Bde were trained to operate the base lines. This 'Fixed Azimuth' system came into action in June 1940, in time for the opening of the night Blitz on London. It was later replaced as searchlight control (SLC) and gunlaying (GL) radar systems were introduced.

However, the performance of the AA defences in the early weeks of the Blitz was poor. AA Command moved 108 HAA guns to the IAZ from other divisions, and arranged 'fighter nights' when the guns remained silent and Royal Air Force (RAF) night fighters were allowed to operate over London with the searchlights. Gun-laying (GL) radar, modern sound-locators and larger (150 cm) searchlights were introduced as rapidly as possible, and by February 1941 Searchlight Control (SLC or 'Elsie') radar began to be issued, replacing the fixed azimuth system. The number of raiders shot down steadily increased until mid-May 1941, when the Luftwaffe scaled down its attacks.

=== Order of Battle 1940–41 ===
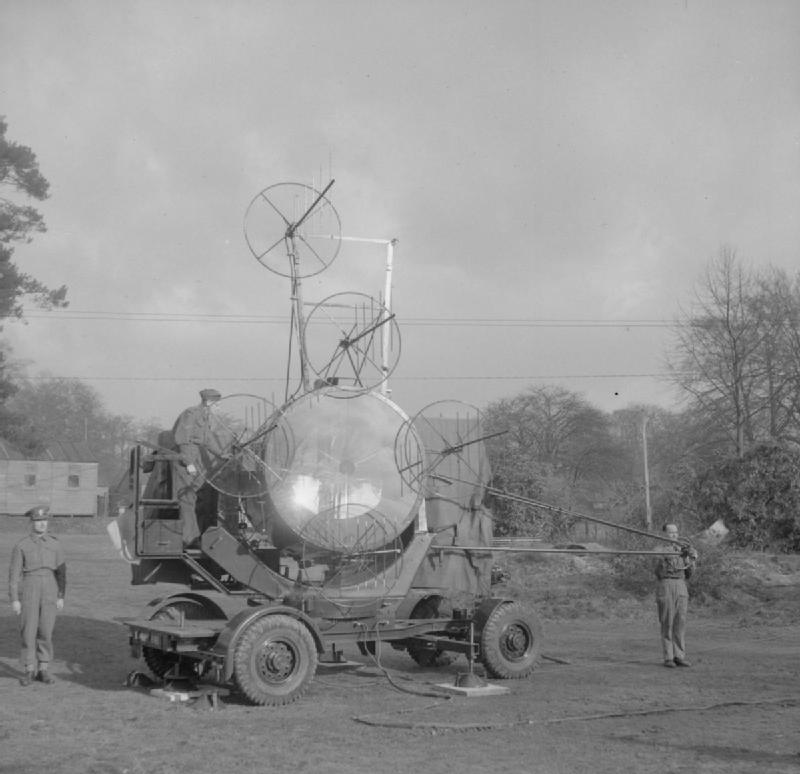
150 cm Searchlight equipped with SLC radar.

The composition of 38 LAA Bde during this period was as follows:

- 26th (LEE) S/L Rgt
  - 301, 302 S/L Btys – attached to 8 AA Division until Summer 1941
  - 321, 339 S/L Btys
- 35th (First Surrey Rifles) S/L Rgt – to 5 AA Division Summer 1941
  - 340, 341, 343 S/L Btys
  - 342 S/L Bty (attached to 5 AA Div)
- 75th (Middlesex) S/L Rgt – converted into 75th LAA Rgt February 1941 and joined 8 AA Division
- 79th S/L Rgt
  - 502, 503, 504 S/L Btys

== Mid-War ==
The Blitz ended in May 1941, but there were occasional raids thereafter and AA Command continued to strengthen its defences. Newly formed units joining AA Command were increasingly 'mixed' ones into which women of the Auxiliary Territorial Service were integrated. AA Command had a critical shortage of Light AA gun (LAA) units, and began a process of converting some S/L units to the role. At the same time, experienced units were posted away for service overseas. This led to a continual turnover of units, which accelerated in 1942 with the preparations for Operation Torch.

The AA defences of Southern England were severely tested in the summer of 1942 by the Luftwaffe's 'hit-and-run' attacks along the South Coast, and there was much reorganisation, accounting for some of the turnover of units listed earlier. LAA units waiting to go overseas were sometimes lent back to AA Command to deal with the hit-and-run raiders.

=== Order of Battle 1941–42 ===
1 AA Divisional formation sign, worn 1940–42.

From the autumn of 1941 onwards, the composition of 38 LAA Bde was as follows:

- 26th (LEE) S/L Rgt – became Mixed July 1942; to 2 AA Group November 1942
  - 301, 302, 321, 339 S/L Btys
- 63rd (Queens) S/L Rgt, RA (TA) – joined Autumn 1941 from 5 AA Division; converted into 127th (Queens) LAA Rgt (with 416,420, 439 and 440 LAA Btys) January 1942 and transferred to 8 AA Division July 1942
  - 438, 439, 440, 524 S/L Btys
- 79th S/L Rgt
  - 342 S/L Bty – from 35th (1st Surrey Rifles) S/L Rgt by May 1942; became Mixed July 1942
  - 502, 503, 504 S/L Btys
- 141st LAA Rgt – new unit formed July 1942; to 2 AA Group November 1942
  - 451, 456, 466, 467 LAA Btys
- 38 AA Bde Mixed Signal Office Section – part of 1 Company, 1 AA Division Mixed Signal Unit, Royal Corps of Signals (RCS)

== Later war ==
A reorganisation of AA Command in October 1942 saw the abolition of its hierarchy of divisions and corps, which were replaced by a single tier of AA Groups more closely aligned with the organisation of RAF Fighter Command. 38 AA Brigade was assigned to a new 1 AA Group covering London, and in November was reorganised as an HAA and LAA gun brigade rather than as a 'Light' AA brigade primarily controlling searchlights. In January 1943 the brigade came under the command of 2 AA Group covering South East England outside London.

=== Order of Battle 1942–44 ===
During this period the brigade was constituted as follows (temporary attachments omitted):

- 100th HAA Rgt – joined December 1942; left AA Command January 1943, later to Allied invasion of Sicily (Operation Husky)
  - 304, 305, 321 HAA Btys
- 105th HAA Rgt – left December 1942; later to 21st Army Group
  - 326, 330, 333 HAA Btys
- 131st HAA Rgt – from 4 AA Group May 1943; disbanded August 1943
  - 310, 368, 376, 428 HAA Btys
- 174th HAA Rgt – from 3 AA Group April 1943; to 21st Army Group May 1943
  - 249, 331, 348 HAA Btys
- 183rd (M) HAA Rgt – new unit formed October 1942
  - 564, 591, 608 (M) HAA Btys
  - 590 (M) HAA Bty – to 137th (M) HAA Rgt early 1943
  - 640 (M) HAA Bty – new battery joined early 1943
- 71st LAA Rgt – left December 1942; later to 21st Army Group
  - 208, 209, 215 LAA Btys
- 75th (Middlesex) LAA Rgt – rejoined December 1942; left AA Command January 1943, later to Operation Husky
  - 233, 234, 303 LAA Btys
- 84th LAA Rgt – from 35 AA Bde April 1943; to 5 AA Bde August 1943
  - 201, 251, 448, 461 LAA Btys
- 97th LAA Rgt – to 2 AA Group December 1942
  - 221, 232, 301, 480 LAA Btys

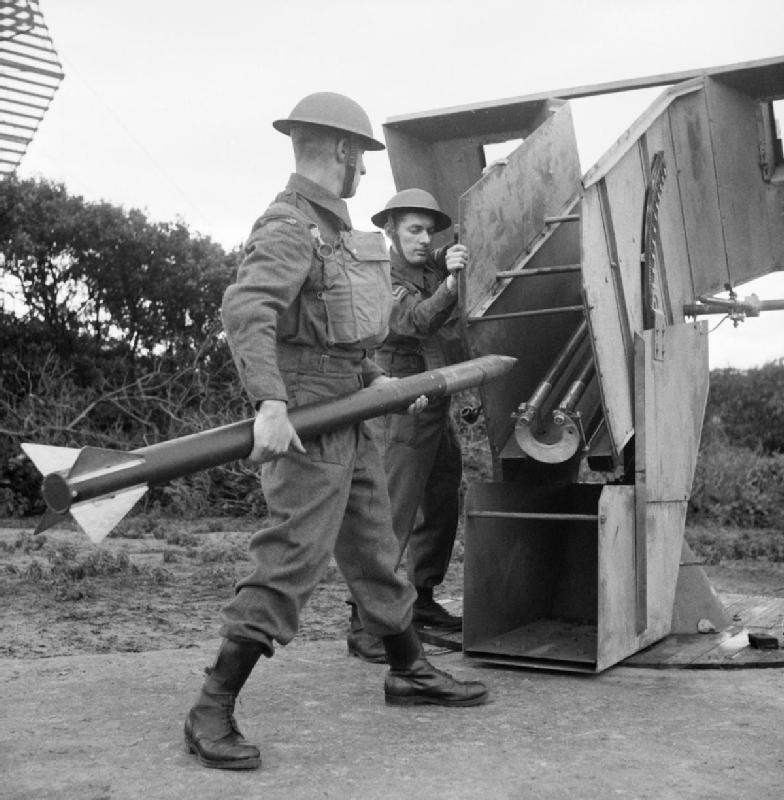
Home Guard soldiers load a single launcher on a static 'Z' Battery, July 1942

- 143rd LAA Rgt – from 71 AA Bde August 1943; to 102 AA Bde April 1944
  - 403, 410, 413 LAA Btys
  - 484 LAA Bty – disbanded by March 1944
- 79th S/L Rgt – to 47 AA Bde by March 1944
  - 502, 503, 504 S/L Btys
- 93rd (M) S/L Rgt – new unit formed October 1942; to 47 AA Bde by March 1944
  - 301 (M), 342 (M), 495 S/L Btys
- 20th (M) AA 'Z' Rgt – equipped with Z Battery rocket-launchers; to 3 AA Group April 1943
  - 194, 198 (M) Z Btys – left January 1943
  - 111, 143, 220 (M) Z Btys – joined January 1943
- 38 AA Bde Mixed Signal Office Section – initially part of 1 Mixed Signal Company, RCS, 1 AA Group, then 2 AA Group

== Operations Overlord and Diver ==
By early 1944 AA Command was being forced to release manpower to 21st Army Group for the planned Allied invasion of continental Europe (Operation Overlord), and a number of AA batteries, regiments and formations had to be disbanded or merged. At the end of April 1944, 38 AA Bde consisted solely of 183rd (M) HAA Rgt and 22 AA Area Mixed Rgt (as 'Z' regiments were now termed). However, AA Command now brought in additional units from other parts of the UK to defend the Overlord embarkation ports. 47 AA Brigade in the Southampton area of 2 AA Group was disbanded and 38 AA Bde took over much of its responsibilities, once again taking control of a number of S/L units across South East England.

Shortly after D-Day, the Germans began launching V-1 flying bombs, codenamed 'Divers', against London. These presented AA Command's biggest challenge since the Blitz. Defences had been planned against this new form of attack (Operation Diver), but it presented a severe problem for AA guns, and after two weeks' experience AA Command carried out a major reorganisation. In August, 38 AA Bde was transferred to the command of 6 AA Group, which had earlier been brought from Scotland to defend the Overlord build-up in the Portsmouth–Solent area. It returned to 2 AA Group in December.

=== Order of Battle 1944 ===
During the rest of 1944, 38 AA Brigade's composition was as follows:

- 179th (M) HAA Rgt – from 4 AA Group May 1944; to 3 AA Group November 1944
  - 584, 606, 607 (M) HAA Btys
- 183rd (M) HAA Rgt – to 102 AA Bde May 1944
  - 564, 591, 608, 640 (M) HAA Btys
- 88th LAA Rgt – from 4 AA Group May 1944; to 102 AA Bde July 1944
  - 178, 289, 293 LAA Btys
- 147th LAA Rgt – from unbrigaded December 1944; left January 1945
  - 492, 493, 495 LAA Btys
- 28th (Essex) S/L Rgt – from 47 AA Bde June 1944
  - 309/311, 312, 438 S/L Btys
- 38th (King's Rgt) S/L Rgt – from 27 (Home Counties) AA Bde May, returned June 1944
  - 350, 351, 352 S/L Btys
- 50th (Northamptonshire Rgt) SL Rgt – from 47 AA Bde June 1944
  - 401, 402, 403 S/L Btys
- 61st (South Lancashire Rgt) S/L Rgt – from 27 (Home Counties) AA Bde May, returned June 1944
  - 432, 433, 434 S/L Btys
- 93rd (M) S/L Rgt – returned from 47 AA Bde June 1944; to 1 AA Group January 1945
  - 301, 342, 495 S/L Btys
- 22nd AA Area Mixed Regiment – joined April 1944; left January 1945
  - 194, 198 (M) Z Btys

By October 1944, the brigade's HQ establishment was 10 officers, 8 male other ranks and 25 members of the ATS, together with a small number of attached drivers, cooks and mess orderlies (male and female). In addition, the brigade had a Mixed Signal Office Section of 5 male other ranks and 19 ATS, which was formally part of the Group signal unit.

== Conversion ==
By the end of 1944, 21st Army Group was suffering a severe manpower shortage, particularly among the infantry. At the same time the German Luftwaffe was suffering from such shortages of pilots, aircraft and fuel that serious aerial attacks on the United Kingdom could be discounted. In January 1945 the War Office began to reorganise surplus AA and coastal artillery regiments in the UK into infantry battalions, primarily for line of communication and occupation duties in North West Europe, thereby releasing trained infantry for frontline service.

A number of AA Brigade HQs in 2 AA Group were also converted: on 22 January 1945, HQ 38 AA Bde was converted into 304th Infantry Brigade under Brigadier C.A.H. Chadwick with the following units under command:

- 630th (Essex) Infantry Regiment, RA, formed by 28th (Essex) S/L Rgt (see above)
- 637th (Northamptonshire Regiment) Infantry Regiment, RA, formed by 50th (Northamptonshire Regiment) S/L Rgt (see above)
- 638th (Royal Northumberland Fusiliers) Infantry Regiment, RA, formed by 53rd (Royal Northumberland Fusiliers) Searchlight Regiment, Royal Artillery.

After infantry training, the brigade went to Norway in June 1945 to help oversee the surrender of the German occupying forces there.

== Postwar ==
When the TA was reformed in 1947, 38 AA Bde was renumbered 64 AA Brigade, (Note: The TA AA brigades were now numbered 51 and upwards, rather than 26 and upwards as in the 1930s; the wartime 64th AA Bde was disbanded in 1944.) with the following order of battle:

- 451 (Chelsea) HAA Regiment
- 497 (Hammersmith) HAA Regiment
- 499 (Mixed) HAA Regiment (Kensington)
- 562 Searchlight Regiment (formerly 27 (London Electrical Engineers) S/L Regt)
- 570 LAA Regiment (1st Surrey Rifles) (formerly 35 (1st Surrey Rifles) S/L Regt)

When AA Command was disbanded in March 1955 the brigade was placed into suspended animation on 31 October, and formally disbanded at the end of 1957.

== External sources ==
- British Army units from 1945 on
- British Military History
- Orders of Battle at Patriot Files
- Land Forces of Britain, the Empire and Commonwealth (Regiments.org)
- The Royal Artillery 1939–45
- Graham Watson, The Territorial Army 1947
