= London Electrical Engineers =

Volunteer army unit in the UK

London Electrical Engineers, RE
- Active: 27 April 1897 – 1 May 1961
- Country: United Kingdom
- Branch: Territorial Army
- Type: Searchlight Regiment
- Role: Air Defence
- Size: Six companies (1914); Multiple companies (WWI); Two regiments (1922–45); One regiment (1947–55); One company (1955–61)
- Garrison/HQ: Victoria, London; Later, Duke of York's Headquarters and Streatham
- Engagements: Second Boer War; World War I The Blitz; Crete; Tobruk; Western Desert

Commanders
- Notable commanders: Col R.E.B. Crompton

The London Electrical Engineers was a Volunteer unit of the British Army's Royal Engineers founded in 1897. It pioneered the use of searchlights (S/Ls) for port defence before World War I and for anti-aircraft (AA) defence during the war. In the interwar period, it formed the two senior searchlight regiments of the Territorial Army, which defended Southern England during The Blitz. Detachments later served in the Battle of Crete and Siege of Tobruk.

== Origin ==
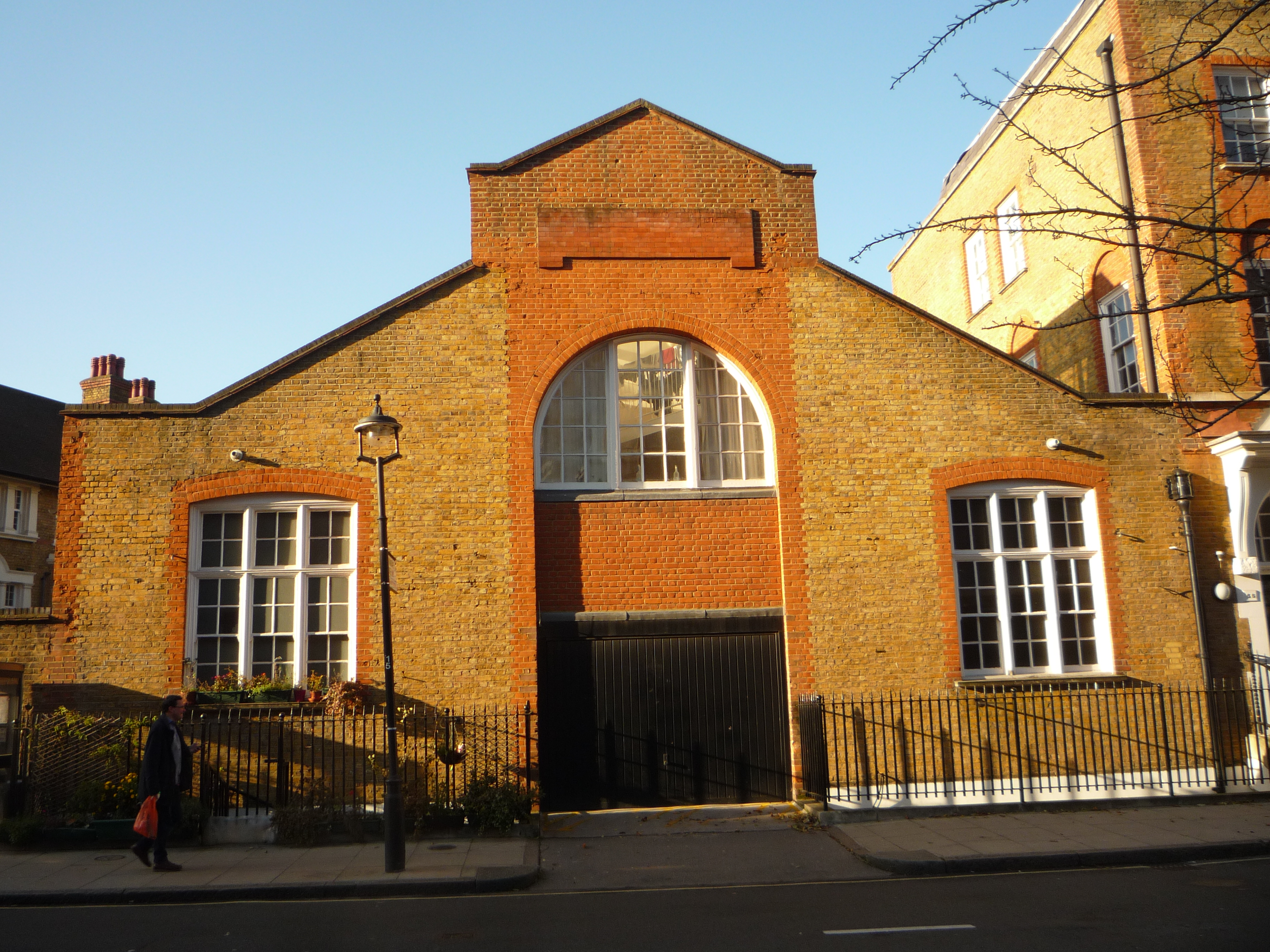
Former Drill Hall of the London Electrical Engineers in Regency Street, London SW1

Queen Victoria approved the formation of 'The Electrical Engineers, Royal Engineers (Volunteers)' on 27 April 1897. Their role was to supplement the regular Royal Engineers (RE) in wartime by operating searchlights to defend major ports in conjunction with minefields controlled by Volunteer companies of Submarine Miners, RE. The headquarters of the new force was at 5 Victoria Street, Westminster, and initially there were four companies recruited in London and the Midlands. By 1908, there were seven 'Divisions' of electrical engineers around the great estuary ports of Britain, including the London Division, which was responsible for the Thames Estuary. The London Electrical Engineers established its HQ at 46 Regency Street, Victoria, in 1900.

== Second Boer War ==
The commanding officer of The Electrical Engineers was Rookes Crompton (1845–1940), the electrical pioneer and founder of Crompton & Co, one of the first large-scale manufacturers of electrical equipment. In his earlier life, he had been an infantry officer in the Rifle Brigade and the 57th Foot before going onto the Reserve List in 1880, but had spent much of his service in India designing military steam wagons. Early in the Second Boer War, Colonel Robert Baden-Powell improvised searchlights to deter night attacks during the Siege of Mafeking. Soon afterwards, Major Crompton led a detachment of the Electrical Engineers Volunteers to South Africa, where they operated electric Arc lamp searchlights of his own design, the first use of such equipment by the Royal Engineers on campaign. The detachment served from April to October 1900 in the Transvaal and Orange Free State. Crompton was promoted to lieutenant-colonel, Mentioned in Dispatches and made a Companion of the Bath for his efforts and was later given the honorary rank of colonel.

== Territorial Force ==
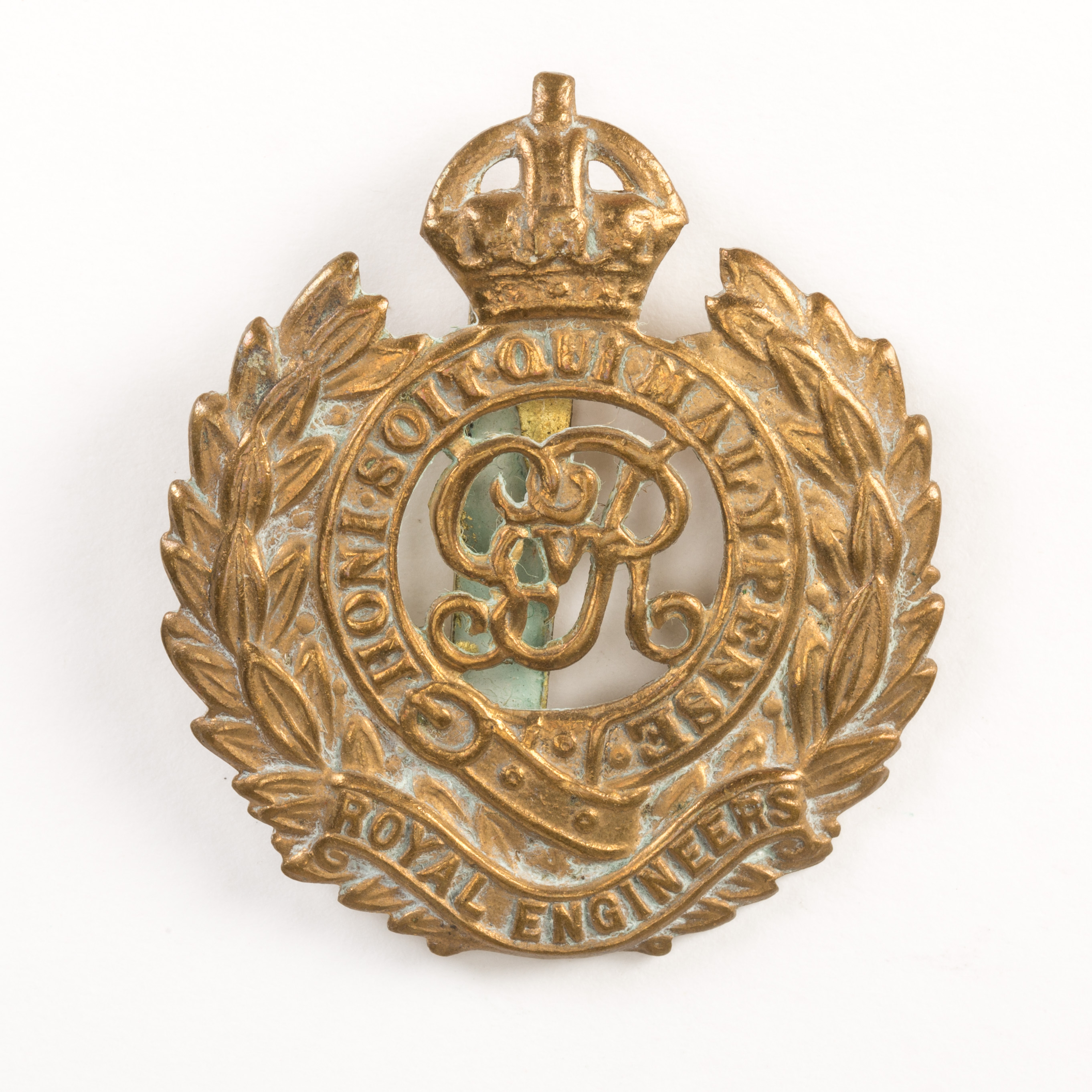
Cap badge of the Royal Engineers (George V cypher).

Under the Haldane Reforms, the Electrical Engineers RE were converted into Fortress Companies RE in the new Territorial Force. They were responsible, among other duties, for electrical installations in the defended ports. The large London Division was planned to split into six RE companies as follows:

- London (Fortress) Royal Engineers
- 1st London Divisional Telegraph Company RE
- 2nd London Divisional Telegraph Company RE
- London Wireless Telegraph Company RE
- London Cable Telegraph Company RE
- London Ballon Telegraph Company RE

However, the plan was changed over the next two years. Instead, the London Electrical Engineers retained its title and role, 1st London Divisional Telegraph Company, RE, (as well as the 1st and 2nd London Divisional Field Companies) was formed by the East London (Tower Hamlets) RE (V), while the 2nd London Divisional Telegraph Company (as well as 3rd and 4th London Field Companies) was formed by the 1st Middlesex RE (V).

The London Division was therefore finally reorganised as follows:

- London Electrical Engineers
- London Wireless Telegraph Company RE
- London Cable Telegraph Company RE
- London Air-Line Telegraph Company RE
- London Balloon Company RE (disbanded 1913)

The three telegraph companies formed London District Signals, while the London Electrical Engineers (LEE) specialised on searchlights. Crompton and most of the other officers appointed to the LEE were Members or Associate Members of the Institution of Civil Engineers. Another was the pioneer aeronautical engineer Edward Teshmaker Busk, who was a lieutenant in the corps. Crompton retired in 1910, but was appointed Honorary Colonel of the corps in 1911.

== World War I ==
By the outbreak of World War I, in August 1914, the London Electrical Engineers had grown to six companies based at Regency Street. Searchlight units were immediately deployed to the South Coast of England and the Thames Estuary to form light barriers against surface raiders. For example, No 2 Company London Electrical Engineers was positioned at Coalhouse Fort in East Tilbury. By an agreement between the Admiralty and War Office on 3 September 1914, responsibility for UK air defence lay initially with the Royal Navy, which provided aircraft, quick-firing guns and searchlights to defend vulnerable points against the anticipated air raids. These acetylene searchlights were operated by civilian Special Constables.

=== Anti-Aircraft defence ===
The first night raid was made by Zeppelin airships on 19/20 January 1915. Then, in April and May, regular raids began on the East Coast of England, reaching London on 31 May/1 June. Zeppelin raids continued during the summer and autumn of 1915, after which it was decided that the Royal Navy would try to deal with raiders approaching the British coastline, while the Army would be responsible for dealing with them over land. The transfer took effect between February and April 1916. Experience had shown the need for plentiful searchlights to guide both gunners and fighter pilots to their targets. The army established a 25-mile wide searchlight belt stretching from Northumberland to Sussex, with a double ring round London.

The TF began forming AA S/L companies in December 1915, mainly from the LEE and the Tyne Electrical Engineers (TEE). By July 1917, there were 42 AA Companies of the RE scattered around the country, all with the LEE and TEE as their parent units. These included the following LEE units:

- Nos 1–6 AA Companies, London
- Nos 11–12 AA Brigade Searchlight Companies
- Nos 20/21 and 24/26 Aeroplane Squadron Searchlight Companies
- No 40 AA Company, Dover
- No 53 AA Company, Newhaven

(The LEE itself had been reduced to five companies by August 1917).

Changes were also needed in searchlight design and training, so a team was selected from the London Electrical Engineers to return to their Headquarters at 46 Regency Street and set up workshops, design and drawing offices to deal with the redesigns. This organisation became The Searchlight Experimental Establishment commanded by Captain P. Yorke, RE. (The TEE similarly took responsibility for the School of Electric Lighting at Gosport.) Technology and tactics developed to keep pace as the Germans replaced vulnerable airships with heavy bombers. New 90 cm and 120 cm electric searchlights and their sound locators were linked directly to the guns to provide early warning.

In August 1918, a new establishment was implemented. The London and Tyne Electrical Engineers became the parent units for all coast defence and anti-aircraft Electric Light units and the depots that trained men for them. It was from these that nearly all RE AA companies and AASL companies were formed, serving on Home Defence, with the British Expeditionary Force in France and Flanders, and on the Italian Front.

Between 1915 and 1918, the RE formed 76 AA Searchlight Sections for overseas service. The LEE is known to have found 25 of these: Nos 2 (jointly with Regular RE), 3–5, 7, 9, 12, 14, 16, 18, 25, 29, 30, 31, 33, 35, 37, 39, 41, 43, 45 and 48, together with Nos 21, 23 and 24, which were formed in France from Nos 1-8 AAS sections. Others were formed by the Regular RE (No 1) and by the TEE. The parent units of a further 29 AAS sections are not known, but they probably consisted of mixed LEE, TEE and Medical Category B personnel. A fixed two-light section in France in 1917 comprised 20 men with three vehicles; a mobile three-light section in 1918 consisted of five vehicles and 28 men.

=== Western Front ===
In August 1915, a detachment of volunteers from the TEE (72 men) and LEE (39 men) proceeded to join the British Expeditionary Force (BEF) in France. They were formed into 13 small detachments, each assigned to a Field Company of the RE to operate small oxy-acetylene searchlights to detect enemy raiding parties in No-Man's Land. Although these were used with some success for a few months, exposing a light drew heavy fire from the enemy, and the dangerous work earned the detachments the nickname of 'the suicide brigade'.

In November 1915, a joint LEE/TEE company was formed for service in France, designated No 1 (London and Tyne) Electrical & Mechanical Company, RE. It assembled at the LEE's HQ in London, and landed at Le Havre on 15 December, where it was attached to General Headquarters (GHQ) of the BEF. It carried out a variety of duties, ranging from installing electric lighting for hospitals, water pumps and laundry equipment, to erecting a printing works and building a trench locomotive. After the Battle of the Somme, it was decided to form an E & M Company for each of the Armies of the BEF and the London & Tyne Company was split to form 351 Company (Second Army) and 354 Company (Fifth Army). 354 Company was later responsible for the development of air-lift and belt water pumps to supply drinking water. During the German spring offensive of 1918, 351 and 354 E &M Companies were entrusted with destroying electrical installations and water supplies ahead of the advancing enemy. These then had to be replaced during the Hundred Days advance.

Among the professionals who served with the London Electrical Engineers during the war were the electrical engineer Reginald Frankland-Payne Gallwey (who later succeeded as the 5th Baronet of that name) and the chemist Theodore Acland. The remaining part-time civilian searchlight operators were also replaced. By the end of the war, there were 622 searchlights in use for Home Defence.

== Interwar ==
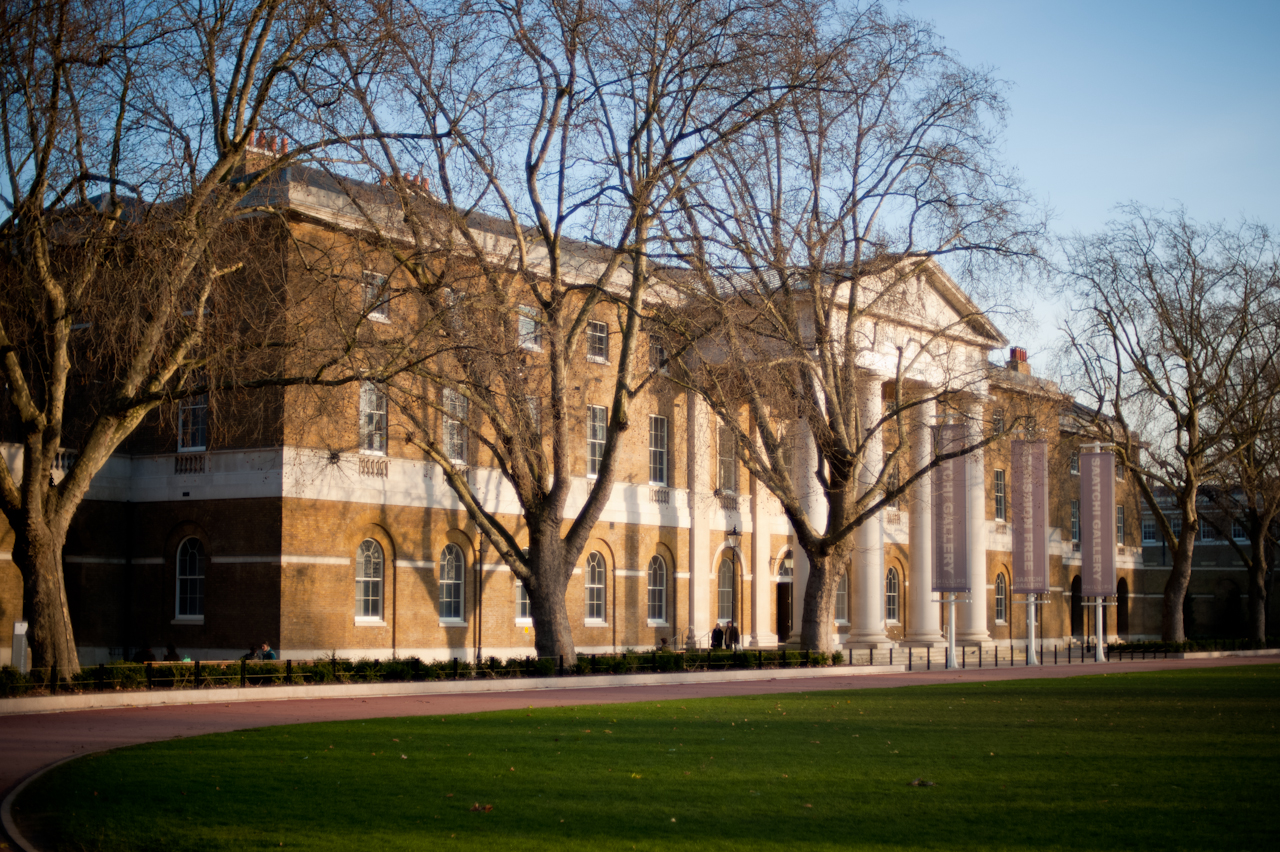
The Duke of York's Headquarters

This large anti-aircraft effort was quickly scaled down after the Armistice, but the Searchlight Experimental Establishment continued as civilian body, with several officers of the London Electrical Engineers still attached. In 1922, the London Electrical Engineers was split into the 10th and 11th Anti-Aircraft Battalions RE. These were renumbered in 1923 as the 26th and 27th (London Electrical Engineers) Battalion, RE, becoming the two senior searchlight units of the new Territorial Army (Numbers 1–25 were reserved for Regular Army units, but most were never used). 26 AA Battalion, based at the Duke of York's Headquarters in Chelsea, comprised Nos 301–3 AA Companies, and 27 AA Bn headquartered at Mitcham Lane, Streatham, had Nos 304–6 based at Rochester Row, Westminster. (The Regency Street premises were used by the former London District Signals, which had become Air Defence Signals.) Crompton remained Honorary Colonel of the 27th.

During the 1930s, the air defence strength of the Territorial Army was greatly expanded. In December 1935, 1st Anti-Aircraft Division was formed to cover London, with 26th and 27th Battalions assigned to 26th (London) Anti-Aircraft Group (later Brigade), which shared the Duke of York's Headquarters. With the further expansion of the TA after 1938, each battalion was brought up to a four-company establishment with newly raised companies, 26th Bn gaining 321 AA Company and 27th Bn receiving 390 AA Company. On 15 December 1938, 26th Battalion transferred its 302 AA Company to 34th (Queen's Own Royal West Kent Regiment) Anti-Aircraft Battalion at Greenwich, receiving 339 AA Company in exchange.

In September 1938, 26th AA Bde was split in two, the two London Electrical Engineer battalions remaining with 38th Light Anti-Aircraft Brigade at the Duke of York's Headquarters.

== World War II ==
90 cm Projector Anti-Aircraft, displayed at Fort Nelson, Portsmouth

=== Mobilisation ===
The TA's AA units were mobilised on 23 September 1938 during the Munich Crisis, with units manning their emergency positions within 24 hours, even though many did not yet have their full complement of men or equipment. The emergency lasted three weeks, and they were stood down on 13 October. In February 1939, the existing AA defences came under the control of a new Anti-Aircraft Command. In June, a partial mobilisation of TA units was begun in a process known as 'couverture', whereby each AA unit did a month's tour of duty in rotation to man selected AA and searchlight positions. On 24 August, ahead of the declaration of war, AA Command was fully mobilised at its war stations.

By October, 306 AA Co had been moved to the area round the Humber Estuary where it came under the command of 46th (Lincolnshire Regiment) AA Bn in 39 AA Bde. In November, the company moved into Grimsby to make that a lighted gun zone. In February 1940, 306 AA Co took over some S/L sites on the East Coast that were positioned to pick up low-flying aircraft laying Parachute mines in the mouth of the Humber.

Cap Badge of the Royal Artillery (pre-1953).

On 1 August 1940, the AA Battalions were transferred from the Royal Engineers to the Royal Artillery, being redesignated Searchlight Regiments, and the AA Companies became Searchlight Batteries. 306 AA Bty returned to 27th (LEE) S/L Rgt in September 1940.

=== Blitz ===
When heavy German night air raids on the UK (The Blitz) began in late summer 1940, the London Inner Artillery Zone (IAZ) had 73 S/L positions operated by 26th and 27th (LEE) and 75th (Middlesex) S/L Rgts, controlled from a central operations room at Brompton, working directly under HQ No 11 Group, Fighter Command at Uxbridge. 75th S/L operated a 'fixed azimuth' line of S/Ls and sound detectors across the flight paths to the IAZ, while the two LEE regiments cooperated with the HAA guns in the urban area. The three regiments continued to form part of 38th AA Brigade under 1st AA Division. Later, as the Blitz continued, 27th (LEE) S/L Rgt moved out to join 47 AA Bde in 5 AA Division, covering Southampton.

By the end of the Blitz, in May 1941, 26th (LEE) S/L Rgt was still with 38th AA Bde in 1 AA Division with 321 and 339 Btys, while 301 and 303 Btys were detached to 8 AA Division in South West England. Meanwhile, 27th (LEE) S/L Rgt had left AA Command, and from now on the two regiments' histories diverged.

=== 26th (Mixed) Searchlight Regiment (London Electrical Engineers) ===
26th Searchlight Regiment retained its role of defending London as part of AA Command throughout the war. It was rejoined by 301 and 303 Btys later in 1941. On 17 February 1942, A Troop of 303 Bty was disbanded and replaced by C Trp of 301 Bty.

A secret trial (the 'Newark Experiment' in April 1941) having shown that women were capable of operating heavy searchlight equipment and coping with conditions on the often desolate searchlight sites, members of the Auxiliary Territorial Service began training to replace male personnel in searchlight regiments. At first, they were employed in searchlight Troop headquarters; however, on 7 July 1942, the 26th became the first 'Mixed' regiment, with seven Troops of ATS women posted to it, forming the whole of 301 Battery and half of 339 Battery. On 25 October that year, 303 and 339 Btys were listed as Mixed, and the all-women 301 Battery transferred to the new 93rd (Mixed) Searchlight Regiment, Royal Artillery, the last searchlight regiment formed, which by August 1943 comprised about 1,500 women out of an establishment of 1,674. A and B Troops of 339 Bty also transferred to 93rd S/L Rgt, in exchange for A and B Trps of 495 Bty.

301 Battery was replaced in the regiment by 569 Bty (the last all-male battery formed), (Note: 569 S/L Battery was originally formed on 8 August 1942 at Enfield from 2 Tps of 301/26 Bty and 2 Tps of 342 Bty from 35th (First Surrey Rifles) S/L Rgt.) and the regiment transferred to 49th AA Bde in 1 AA Group (which had replaced 1 AA Division). With the lower threat of attack by the weakened Luftwaffe, AA Command was being forced to release manpower for the planned invasion of Normandy (Operation Overlord). All Home Defence searchlight regiments were reduced in February 1944, and 26th (LEE) S/L Rgt lost 569 Bty, which commenced disbandment on 2 April. By November that year, all men of A1 medical category under the age of 30 had been transferred to the infantry.

=== 27th (London Electrical Engineers) Searchlight Regiment ===
The regiment left the UK early in 1941 to move to Egypt, where it came under the command of 2 AA Bde based in Cairo. Until late 1942 (when it was joined by a Royal Marines unit), it was the only searchlight regiment in Middle East Forces, and frequently had detachments serving over a wide area.

==== Crete ====
In May 1941, 304 Battery was detached with other Royal Artillery units from Egypt to Crete, where it operated 20 searchlight projectors in the defence of the Suda Bay area alongside mainly Royal Marine AA gunners (whose own searchlight unit was acting as infantry). German air raids began on 14 May, reaching a peak of intensity on the morning of 20 May, followed by landings by German paratroops and gliders as the Battle of Crete began.

On 22 May, at St Matthews Hill near Canea, Battery Serjeant-Major William Egglesfield of 304th S/L Bty called for a volunteer and went out with Gunner L.E.P. Cory to rescue a wounded trooper of the Northumberland Hussars lying wounded in a ravine some 800 yards away. They brought the man back over open ground under fire from snipers. BSM Egglesfield was recommended for a Distinguished Conduct Medal but was awarded a Military Medal, as was Gnr Cory.

By 26 May, after continuous German attack from the air and by airborne troops, the defences round Canea finally collapsed and Suda had to be abandoned. The force had to retreat across the island to Sfakia, where the Royal Navy evacuated as many as possible to Egypt. Thousands of British and Commonwealth troops were taken prisoner.

==== Tobruk ====
While the Battle of Crete was progressing, two Troops of 306 Battery were serving with 4 AA Bde in the defence of Tobruk, which resisted months of air attack. Meanwhile, night bombing attacks on British bases in Egypt were common, and two Troops of 390 Battery were guarding Alexandria.

By October 1941, the whole regiment (including the reconstituted 304 Bty) was back in Egypt under the command of 2 AA Bde:

- 304 Bty in the Suez Canal area with 24 x S/Ls
- 305 Bty at Port Said and Port Fuad with 24 x S/Ls
- 390 Bty less 1 Trp at Suez and Shallufa with 18 x S/Ls
- One Trp 390 Bty at Alexandra with 8 x 150 mm S/Ls

giving a total of 74 projectors – the only S/Ls then in Egypt.

The British Eighth Army advanced again in Operation Crusader, and AA units followed behind. Detachments of 305 Bty were serving with 4 AA Bde in Tobruk on 21 June 1942, when the port was captured by Axis forces.

Among the members of 305 Bty who were captured was Serjeant C.D. McLaren, Royal Corps of Signals, who escaped from a German Prisoner of War camp in Italy in September 1943 and succeeded in reaching the Allied lines, for which he was awarded a Mention in Dispatches.

==== Alamein and after ====
At the time of the Battle of Alamein, two Troops of the regiment were serving with 12 AA Bde under HQ Eighth Army for Army Area protection. During the opening night phase of the battle (Operation Lightfoot), five searchlights were used to assist the assaulting troops to keep direction.

As Eighth Army pursued the Axis forces across North Africa, AA units followed to defend its lines of communication. By January 1943, the regiment was deployed as follows:

- RHQ 27 S/L Rgt, 304 and 305 Btys under 21 AA Bde covering Port Said, Suez Canal, Suez and Cairo with 24 x S/Ls
- 304 Bty under 18 AA Bde covering Alexandria, Aboukir, Mersa Matruh and landing grounds with 24 x S/Ls
- 306 Bty under 2 AA Bde in Tripoli on tasks for XXX Corps with 24 x S/Ls
- 390 under 1 AA Bde covering Benghazi, Agedabia and landing grounds with 12 S/Ls.

By the end of the campaign in North Africa, in May 1943, the regiment was deployed as follows:

- RHQ 27 S/L Rgt and 305 Bty under 21 AA Bde covering the Suez Canal, Suez and Cairo
- 304 Bty under 18 AA Bde covering Alexandria, Aboukir and the Nile Delta
- 306 Bty under 2 AA Bde at Tripoli and RAF Castel Benito
- 390 Bty under 1 AA Bde covering Benghazi landing grounds

==== Middle East Forces ====
After the Allied victory in North Africa, 27th Searchlight Regiment remained under Middle East Forces. By January 1944, as the war moved away, the AA defences of the Middle East were being run down, and surplus personnel were sent as reinforcements to other theatres of the war. At this time, the regiment had been reduced to just two active batteries:

- 304 Bty under 18 AA Bde covering Port Said and Alexandria
- 390 Bty under 1 AA Bde in the Levant, including Haifa, Homs and Baalbek

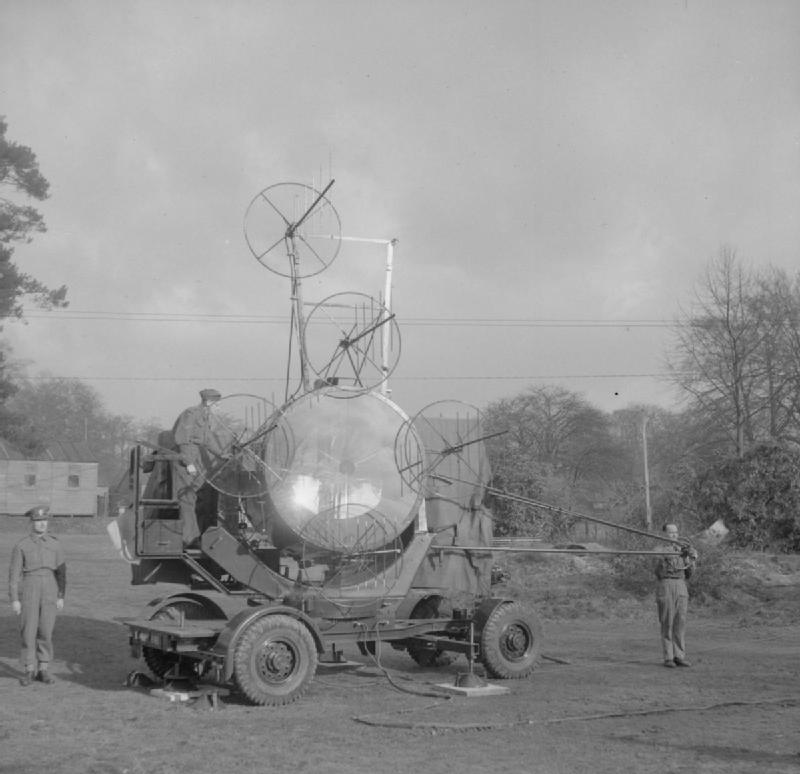
150 cm projector equipped with Mk 2 SLC Radar

484 (Carmarthenshire) S/L Bty, which had served during the long Siege of Malta, began arriving at Alexandria from Malta on 1 January 1944, and on 17 January was attached to 27th (LEE) S/L Rgt. It had brought its own equipment, but took over 90 cm S/L positions from 304 Bty and became operational along the Suez Canal on 24 February with Battery HQ at Ismailia under 78 AA Bde while 304 Bty was deployed to Tobruk. But there was little to do apart from training with the new Searchlight Control (SLC) radar. In May, 304 Bty returned to Ismailia and 484 Bty went a short way to Quassassin where it came under 21 AA Bde.

By June, the AA defences of the Middle East had been reduced to a 'shell' to protect Alexandria and the Suez Canal. In July, the regiment was disposed as follows:

- RHQ, 306 and 484 Btys under 17 AA Bde in the Suez Canal area
- 390 Bty under 1 AA Bde covering the Levant and Cyprus

The following month, 484 Bty began to disband (officially it entered 'suspended animation' on 10 September) and most of its personnel were sent to No 2 Depot Regiment, RA, for drafting elsewhere. 390 Battery disbanded on 27 September 1944. 27th (LEE) S/L Regiment and the remaining batteries followed it into suspended animation on 15 June 1945.

== Postwar ==
When the TA was reconstituted on 1 January 1947, 26th Searchlight Regiment and its three remaining batteries (303, 321, 339) was placed in suspended animation at Benbow Barracks, Blandford Camp. The war-raised personnel then reformed the regiment in the Regular Army, redesignated from 1 April as 118th Searchlight Rgt with 357, 358, 359 S/L btys (now unmixed). However, this was rescinded a month later.

Meanwhile, 26th (LEE) S/L Regt was reformed on 1 January 1947 as Regimental Headquarters of 121 Construction Regiment RE (County of London), a TA unit formed from the London Corps Troops Engineers and 47th (London) Infantry Division Engineers, based at the Duke of York's Headquarters. This combined unit later became part of the present-day 101 (City of London) Engineer Regiment.

The 27th (LEE) S/L Rgt was reconstituted in the TA on 1 January 1947 as 562 Searchlight Regiment RA (27th London Electrical Engineers). Two years later, it incorporated members of the Women's Royal Army Corps and was redesignated as a Mixed Light Anti-Aircraft/Searchlight regiment. It was subordinated to 64 AA Bde. When Anti-Aircraft Command was disbanded on 10 March 1955, 562 Regiment was merged into 624 LAA Regiment (Royal Fusiliers), becoming R Battery (London Electrical Engineers) in the combined regiment. Finally, on 1 May 1961, 624 LAA Regiment merged into a TA infantry battalion of the Royal Fusiliers and the London Electrical Engineers lineage ended.

== Memorials ==
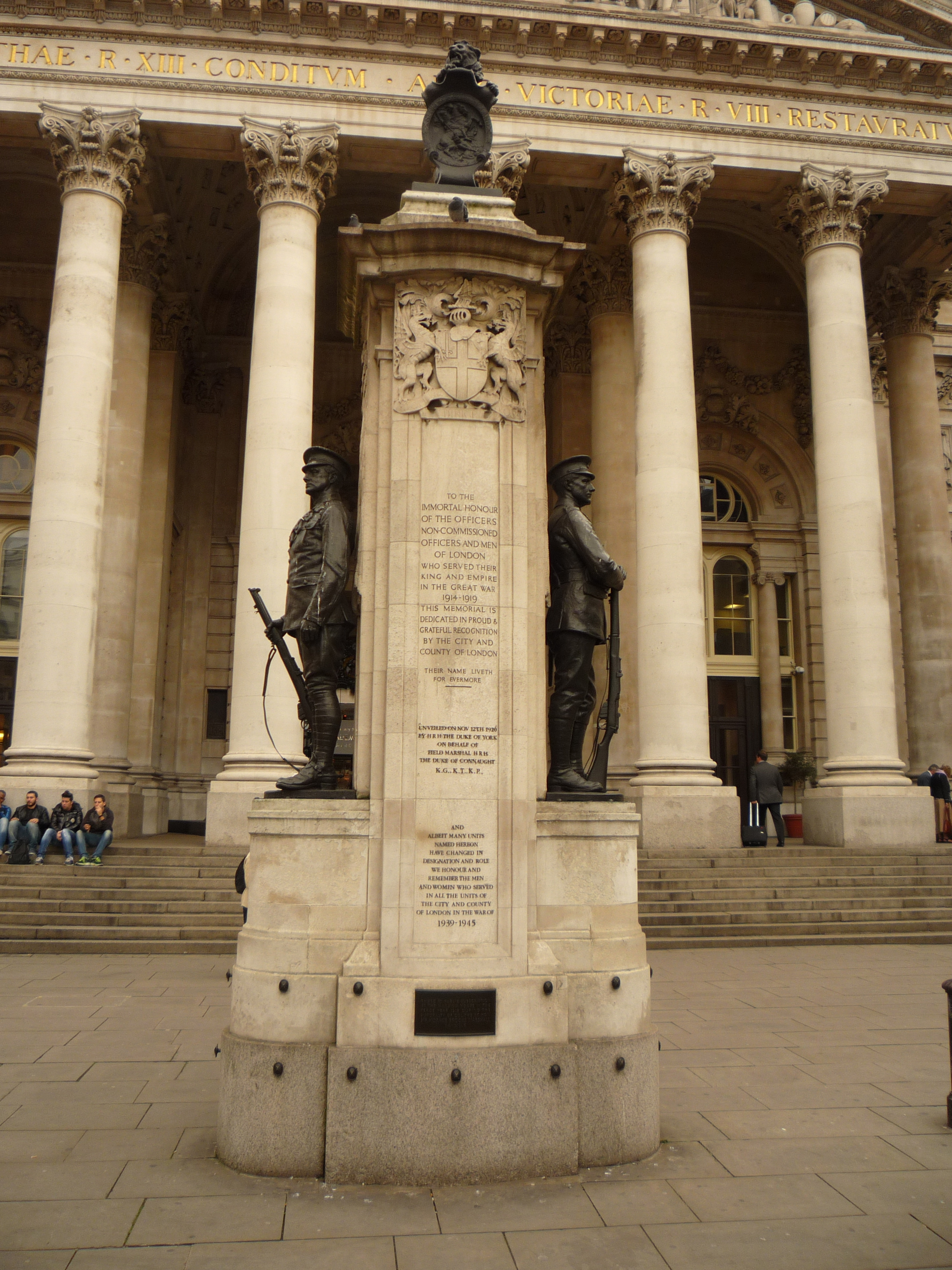
The London Troops Memorial at the Royal Exchange, London.

The London Electrical Engineers are listed on the City and County of London Troops Memorial in front of the Royal Exchange, London, with architectural design by Sir Aston Webb and sculpture by Alfred Drury.

== Honorary Colonels ==
The following served as Honorary Colonels:

The Electrical Engineers

- William Thomson, 1st Baron Kelvin, OM, GCVO, FRS, appointed 18 August 1897

London Electrical Engineers

- Col R.E.B. Crompton, CB, FRS, appointed 24 June 1911

26th (London Electrical Engineers) Anti-Aircraft Battalion:

- Sir Vivian Gabriel, CSI, CMG, CVO, CBE, VD, appointed 1 January 1929

27th (London Electrical Engineers) Anti-Aircraft Battalion:

- Col R.E.B. Crompton
- A.W. Goodwin, MP, appointed 19 December 1929
- Henry Mond, 2nd Baron Melchett appointed 18 June 1938

== External sources ==
- British & Commonwealth Orders of Battle
- British Army units from 1945 on
- British Military History
- Great War Forum
- The Long, Long Trail
- Graham Watson, The Territorial Army 1947
- Orders of Battle at The Patriot Files
- The Regimental Warpath 1914–1918
- Royal Artillery 1939–1945
- UK National Inventory of War Memorials
