= 1st Anti-Aircraft Division (United Kingdom) =

Air Defence formation of the British Army

- Formation sign of the 1st Anti-Aircraft Division.
- Active: 15 December 1935 – 30 September 1942
- Country: United Kingdom
- Branch: Territorial Army
- Type: Anti-Aircraft Division
- Role: Air Defence
- Size: 200
- Part of: London District (1935–39); Anti-Aircraft Command (1939–40); 1 AA Corps (1940–42)
- Garrison/HQ: Hillingdon House, Uxbridge
- Engagements: Battle of Britain; The Blitz

Commanders
- Notable commanders: Maj-Gen Sir Frederick Pile (1937–39); Maj-Gen Robert Whittaker (1940–41)

The 1st Anti-Aircraft Division (1st AA Division) was an Air Defence formation of the British Army before and during the early years of the Second World War. It defended London during the Battle of Britain and The Blitz.

== Origin ==
The 1st AA Division was organised on 15 December 1935 at Hillingdon House, RAF Uxbridge (at that time the headquarters of the Royal Observer Corps).

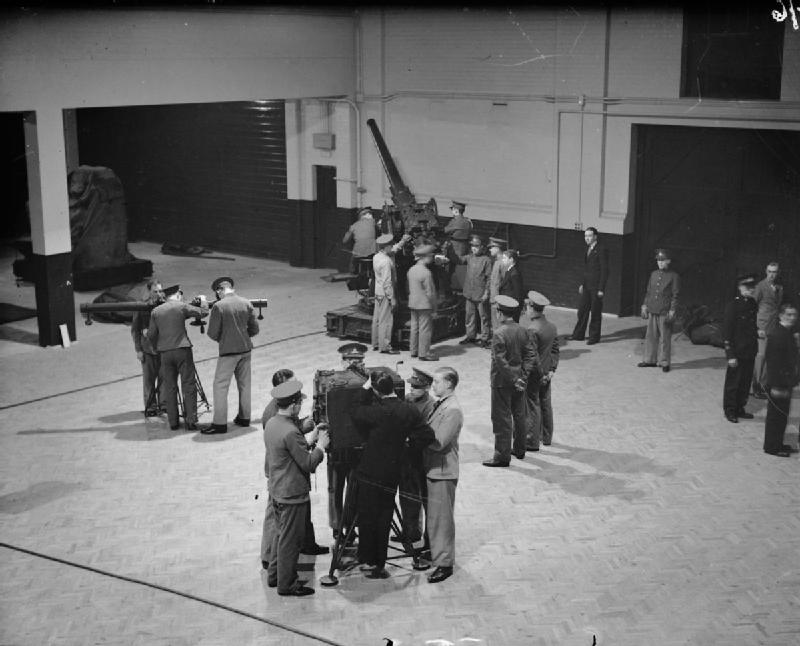
Men of a TA battery training on a 3-inch gun at their drill hall in 1938.

Responsible to London District but under the operational control of RAF Fighter Command, the Division's role was to command the growing number of Territorial Army (TA) anti-aircraft gun and searchlight units around London (the 2nd AA Division was formed in 1936 to cover the rest of the country). The headquarters of the division was formed by converting the headquarters of the 47th (2nd London) Infantry Division, whose General Officer Commanding, Major-General R.H.D. Thomson, continued as GOC of the new formation. Thomson had been Commander TA Air Defence Brigades and Inspector of Regular AA Units, and thus already responsible for the four brigades or 'groups' that comprised the division. He also chaired the War Office committee on expansion and mobilisation of TA AA units, which sat from 1935 to 1937. Tompson was followed in 1937 by Maj-Gen Sir Frederick Pile, who was promoted in 1939 to command the whole of Anti-Aircraft Command.

=== Order of battle 1935 ===
The 1st AA Division was initially composed of the following formations and units:

- General Officer Commanding: Major-General R.H.D. Thomson
- '26th (London) AA Group' organised 16 December 1935 at the Duke of York's Headquarters, Chelsea
  - 51st (London) Anti-Aircraft Brigade, Royal Artillery (TA) – AA guns
  - 52nd (London) Anti-Aircraft Brigade, RA (TA) – AA guns
  - 53rd (City of London) Anti-Aircraft Brigade, RA (TA) – AA guns
  - 54th (City of London) Anti-Aircraft Brigade, RA (TA) – AA guns
  - 26th (London) Anti-Aircraft Battalion (London Electrical Engineers), Royal Engineers (TA) – searchlights
  - 27th (London) Anti-Aircraft Battalion (London Electrical Engineers), RE (TA) – searchlights
- '27th (Home Counties) AA Group' organised 15 December 1935 at RAF Kenley, Surrey
  - 60th (City of London) Anti-Aircraft Brigade, RA (TA) – AA guns
  - 30th (Surrey) Anti-Aircraft Battalion, RE (TA) – searchlights
  - 31st (City of London Rifles) Anti-Aircraft Battalion, RE (TA) – searchlights
  - 34th (The Queen's Own Royal West Kent) Anti-Aircraft Battalion, RE (TA) – searchlights
  - 35th (First Surrey Rifles) Anti-Aircraft Battalion, RE (TA) – searchlights
- '28th (Thames and Medway) AA Group'
  - 55th (Kent) Anti-Aircraft Brigade, RA (TA) – AA guns
  - 58th (Kent) Anti-Aircraft Brigade, RA (TA) – AA guns
  - 61st (Finsbury Rifles) Anti-Aircraft Brigade, RA (TA) – AA guns
  - 29th (Kent) Anti-Aircraft Battalion, RE (TA) – searchlights
  - 32nd (7th City of London) Anti-Aircraft Battalion, RE (TA) – searchlights
- '29th (East Anglian) AA Group' organised January 1936 at RAF North Weald, Essex
  - 59th (The Essex Regiment) Anti-Aircraft Brigade, RA (TA) – AA guns
  - 28th (Essex) Anti-Aircraft Battalion, RE (TA) – searchlights
  - 33rd (St Pancras) Anti-Aircraft Battalion, RE (TA) – searchlights
  - 36th (Middlesex) Anti-Aircraft Battalion, RE (TA) – searchlights
- 1st Anti-Aircraft Divisional Signals, Royal Corps of Signals (RCS), Regency Street, London SW1
- 1st Anti-Aircraft Divisional Royal Army Service Corps (RASC), Crescent Road, Plumstead

In 1938 the Royal Artillery replaced the unit designation 'Brigade' by 'Regiment', which allowed the AA Groups to take the more usual formation title of Brigades.

The AA Divisions were unlike field formations: they were established to organise training and later exercise operational command in the static conditions of home defence, but relied entirely on the Home Forces commands for logistic support, supplies, and heavy repairs.

== Mobilisation ==
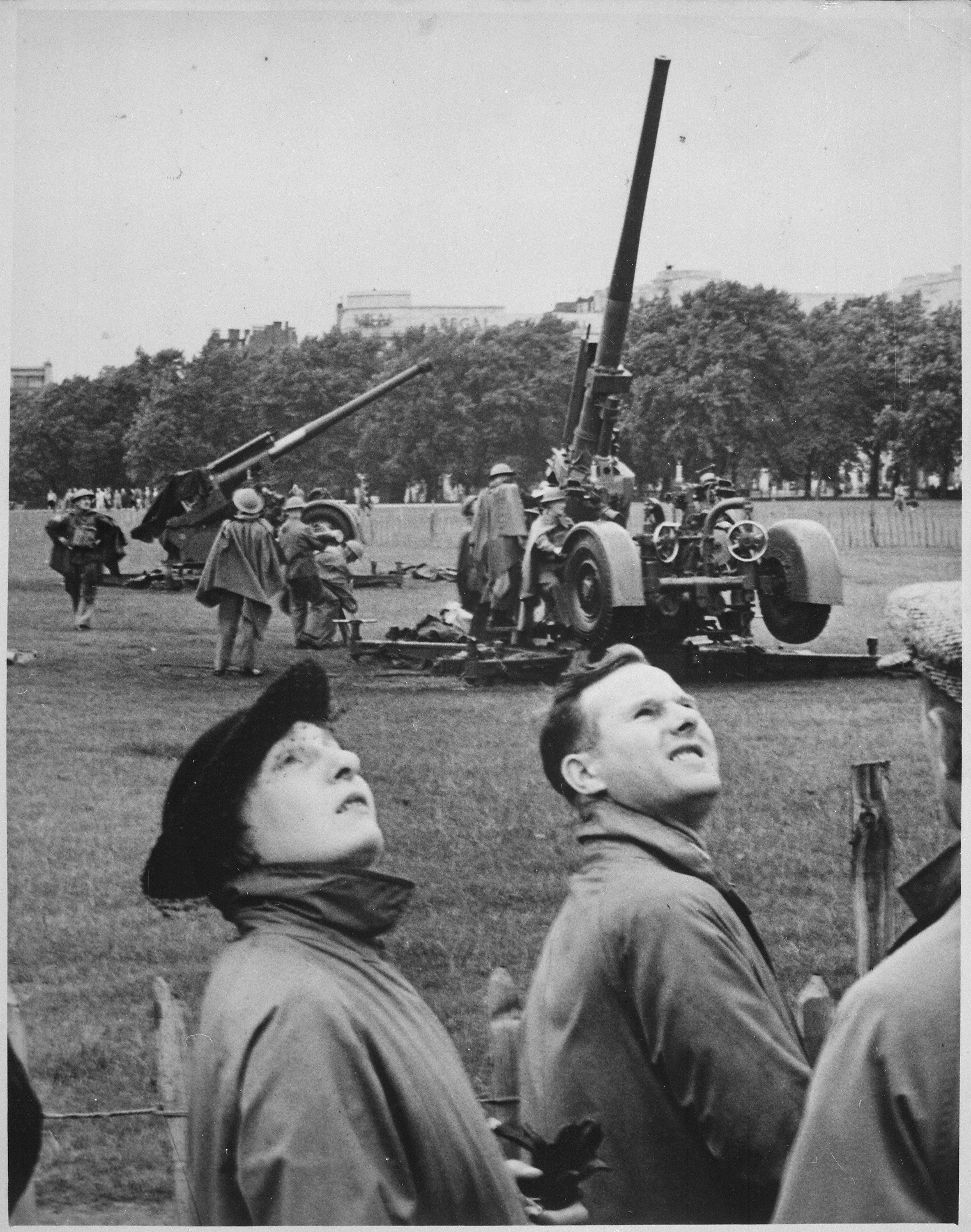
3.7-inch AA guns deployed in Hyde Park, London during an air defence exercise in August 1939.

The TA's AA units were mobilised on 23 September 1938 during the Munich Crisis. The staff of the 1st AA Division now had to implement the Tompson Committee's plan. The call-out of key parties by telephone and telegram went well, and they assembled at their drill halls within a few hours. Because the units possessed only a small scale of transport, elaborate plans had been made to requisition civilian vehicles, ranging from heavy lorries to buses and private cars. Equipment was drawn from mobilisation stores, and the detachments ferried out to their war stations. Despite some failures and problems, the emergency positions covering London were manned and most of the equipment was in place within 24 hours. The emergency mobilisation lasted nearly three weeks before the TA units were released on 14 October. The experience brought about improvements in equipment scales, and a rapid expansion of AA defences brought many new AA gun and searchlight units into existence, some by conversion of TA infantry battalions.

The existing divisions and brigades were expanded, and the whole AA defence of the United Kingdom was taken over by Anti-Aircraft Command on 1 April 1939. A new 6th AA Division was formed by duplicating the 1st AA Division's HQ at Uxbridge. The 6th AA Division took over responsibility for defending the Thames Estuary and the adjacent areas of Essex and North Kent, allowing the 1st AA Division to concentrate on the defence of London. The 27th, 28th and 29th AA Brigades were transferred to the new formation. The deterioration in international relations during 1939 led to a partial mobilisation in June, and a proportion of TA AA units manned their war stations under a rotation system known as 'Couverture'. Full mobilisation of AA Command came in August 1939, ahead of the declaration of war on 3 September 1939.

=== Order of Battle 1939 ===
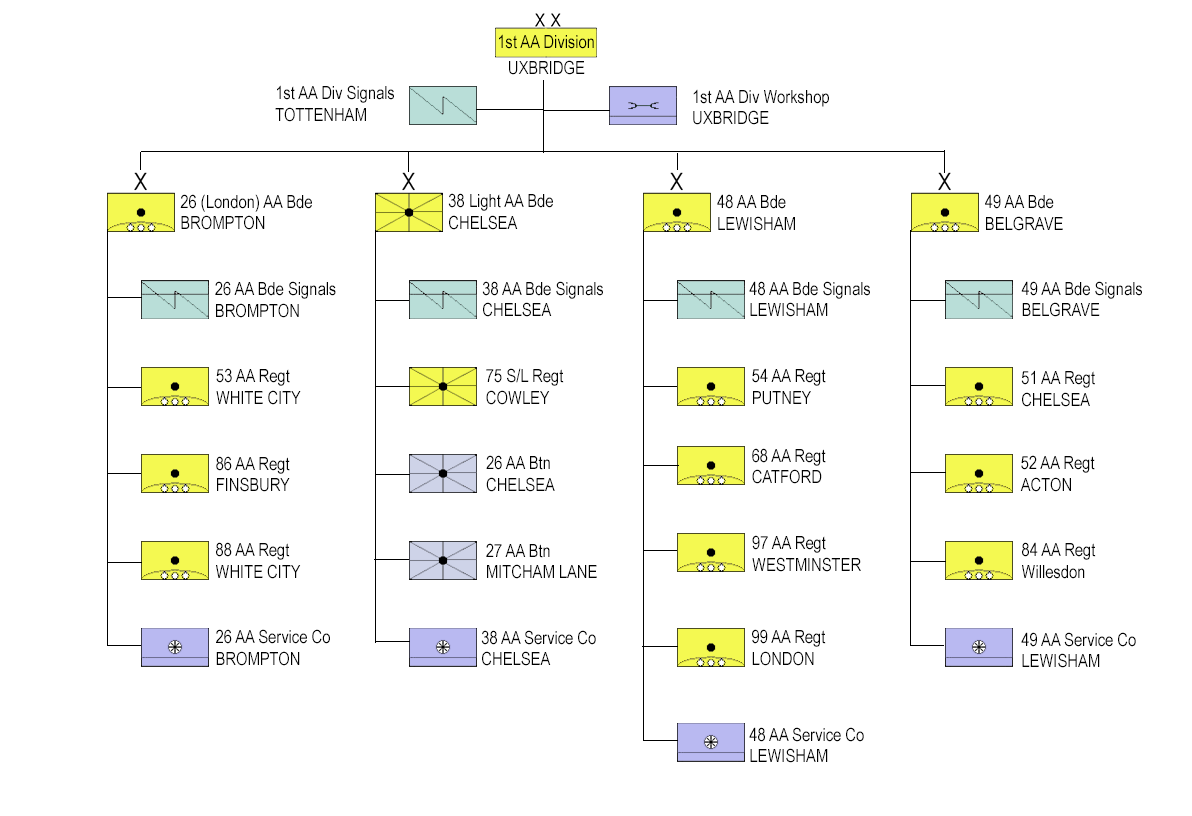
1st AA Division graphic in September 1939 just before mobilisation.

When the UK declared war on 3 September 1939, the 1st AA Division had the following composition:

GOC: Major-General F.L.M. Crossman, DSO, MC

HQ: Hillingdon House, RAF Uxbridge

- 26th (London) Anti-Aircraft Brigade, Brompton Road, London SW3 – heavy AA guns
  - 53rd (City of London) Anti-Aircraft Regiment, RA (TA)
  - 86th (HAC) Anti-Aircraft Regiment, RA (TA)
  - 88th Anti-Aircraft Regiment, RA (TA)
- 38th Light Anti-Aircraft Brigade, organised 28 September 1938 at Duke of York's Headquarters, Chelsea, by duplication of the 26th AA Brigade – searchlights
  - 26th (London Electrical Engineers) Anti-Aircraft Battalion, RE (TA)
  - 27th (London Electrical Engineers) Anti-Aircraft Battalion, RE (TA)
  - 75th (Middlesex) Searchlight Regiment, RA (TA)
- 48th Anti-Aircraft Brigade, organised 28 August 1939 at Lewisham – heavy AA guns
  - 54th (City of London) Anti-Aircraft Regiment, RA (TA)
  - 60th (City of London) Anti-Aircraft Regiment, RA (TA)
  - 97th (London Scottish) Anti-Aircraft Regiment, RA (TA)
  - 99th (London Welsh) Anti-Aircraft Regiment, RA (TA)
- 49th Anti-Aircraft Brigade, organised 28 August 1939 at Lower Belgrave Street, London SW1 – heavy AA guns
  - 51st (London) Anti-Aircraft Regiment, RA (TA)
  - 52nd (London) Anti-Aircraft Regiment, RA (TA)
  - 84th (Middlesex, London Transport) Anti-Aircraft Regiment, RA (TA)

In August 1940 the RE 'Anti-Aircraft' (searchlight) battalions became regiments of the RA. Royal Artillery AA units were now designated Heavy Anti-Aircraft (HAA), Light Anti-Aircraft (LAA), or Searchlight (S/L) regiments and batteries.

== Defences ==
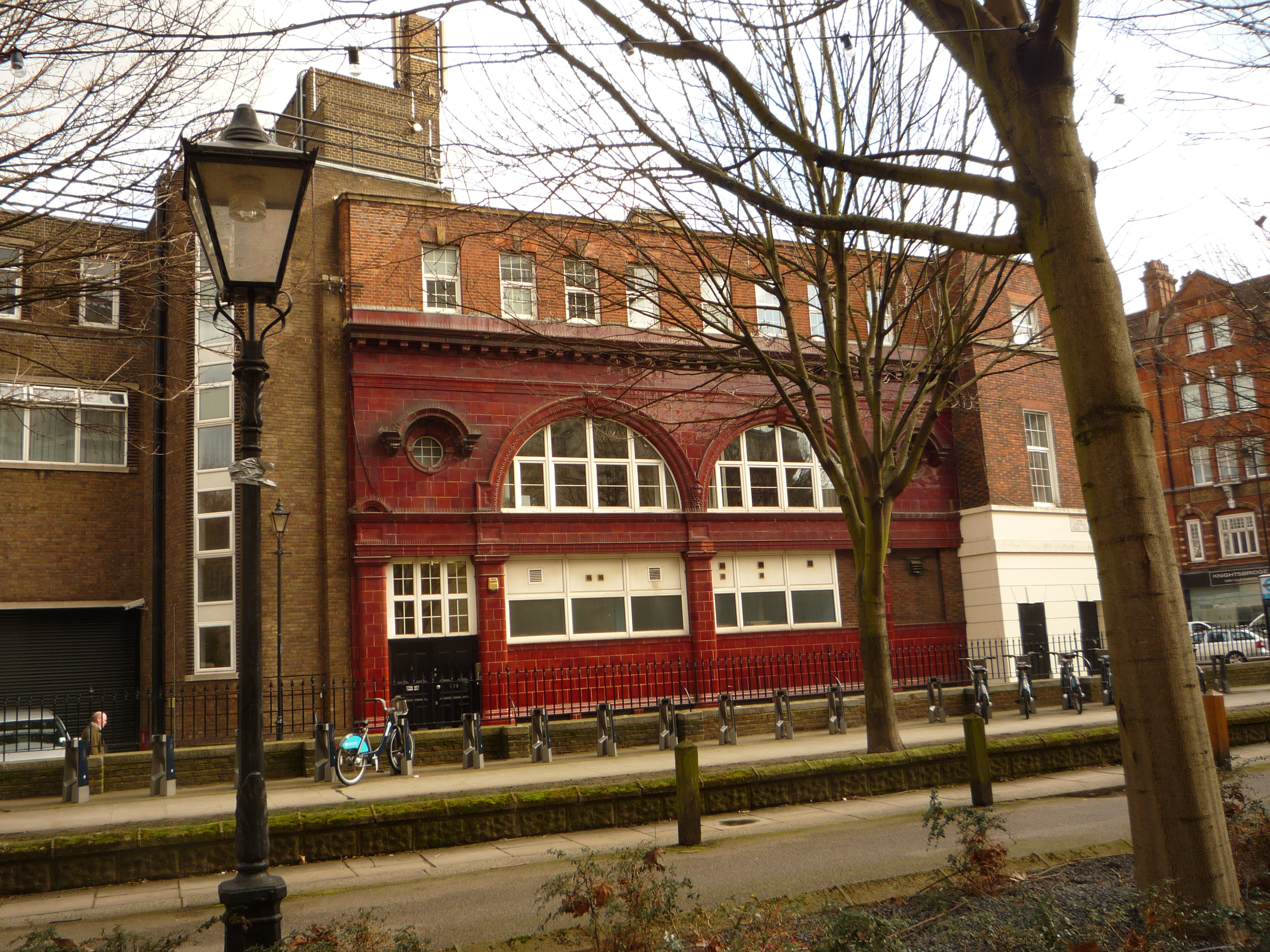
206 Brompton Road, the former Brompton Road tube station closed in 1934, used as the headquarters of the London Inner Artillery Zone anti-aircraft defences during the Second World War

The 1st AA Division had established a control centre at a disused Underground station at Brompton Road. The tunnels, subways and lift-shafts were adapted to provide bomb-proof accommodation for a Central Operation Room reporting direct to HQ No. 11 Group RAF at Uxbridge, and four Gun Operations Rooms (GORs) subdividing the London Inner Artillery Zone (IAZ). An elaborate network of dedicated telephone lines was laid by the General Post Office and Royal Corps of Signals, linking the AA sites, including many isolated searchlight positions.

On mobilisation in August 1939, the 1st AA Division controlled 159 HAA guns, 96 searchlights, and a mixture of LAA guns (1 x 3-inch, 1 x 40mm Bofors and 52 light machine-guns (LMGs)). Most of the HAA guns were assigned to the IAZ, with one troop of 4 guns at Fighter Command HQ at Stanmore and four more (16 guns) at airfields.

The London IAZ extended from Cheshunt and Dagenham in the east to Bexley and Mitcham in the south and to Richmond and Northolt in the west. The HAA positions were sited to produce an optimum density of fire of at least 16 guns engaging any one raid simultaneously. It had been intended that the 26th AA Brigade would control the whole zone, but it proved too complex for one HQ, and in September 1939 it was divided among three: the 26th AA Brigade (34 sites disposed to north and east), the 48th AA Brigade (28 sites to south-east and south), and the 49th AA Brigade (12 sites to west). The 26th AA Brigade still had the heaviest concentration of guns, mainly static 3.7-inch and 4.5-inch guns, with sites being increased from four to eight guns each. The 48th AA Brigade had a mixture of 3.7 and 4.5-inch guns, half of the former being mobile. The 49th AA Brigade had older 3-inch guns, but also controlled a higher proportion of LAA sites at Vital Points (VPs). Superimposed on the IAZ were the 73 searchlight sites controlled by the 38th AA Brigade.

== Battle of Britain ==
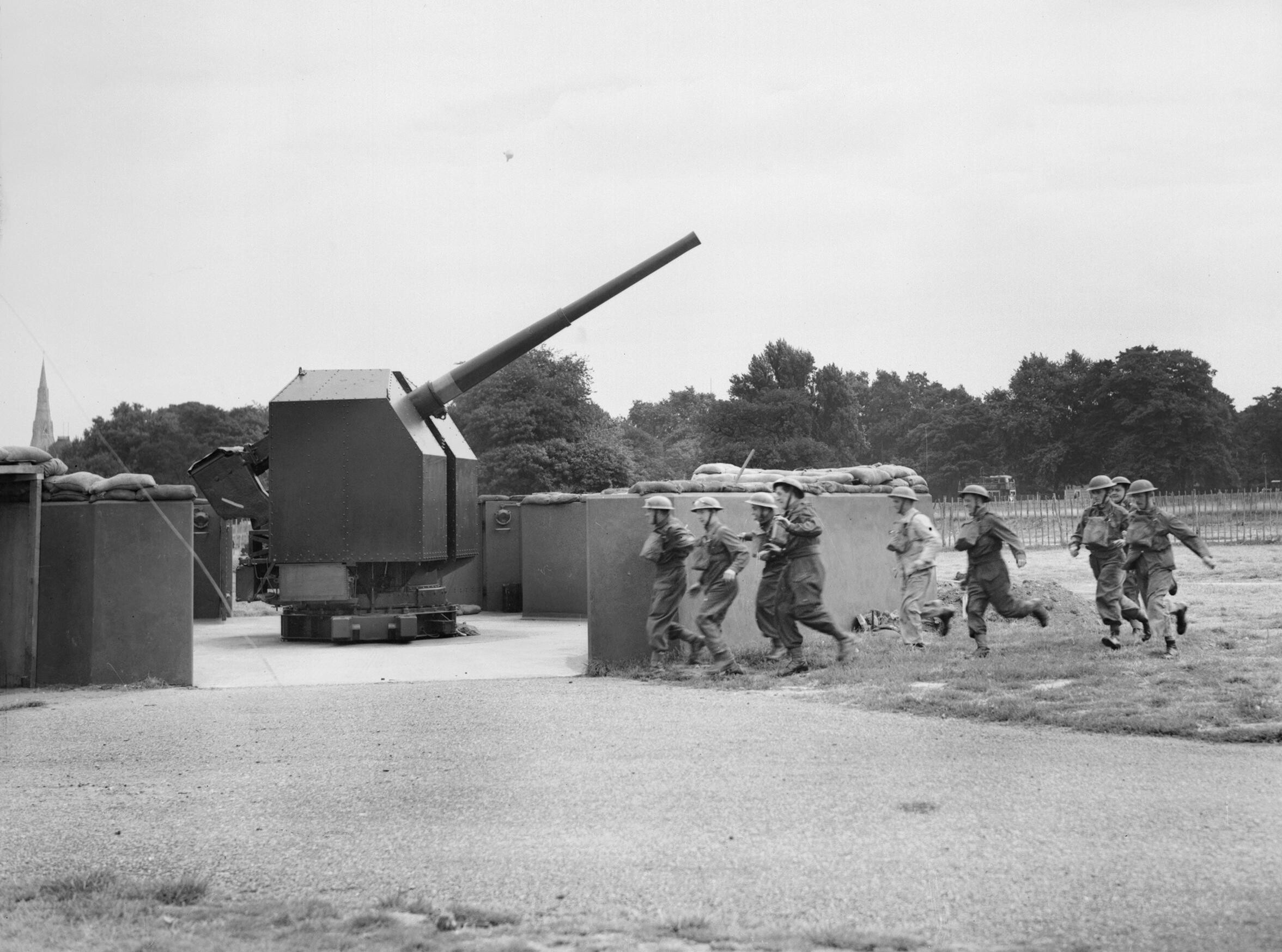
The crew of a 4.5-inch static AA gun at Clapham Common take post in August 1940

On 5 June 1940, after the British Army had been evacuated from Dunkirk and the Battle of Britain was about to start, the 1st AA Division comprised 45 4.5-inch, 39 3.7-inch and 26 3-inch HAA guns, with three 3-inch, 19 Bofors, three twin Vickers and 185 LMGs in the LAA role, together with 240 90 cm searchlights. On 11 July, the division's guns were disposed with 92 defending London, 28 at Slough, 4 at Hounslow, 4 at Stanmore, and 34 others dispersed to VPs.

While the Luftwaffe attacked RAF airfields, only the guns of the 48th AA Brigade in south-east London were engaged. On 1 September, over 200 aircraft attacked Maidstone, RAF Biggin Hill, RAF Kenley and Chatham: the guns of the 1st and 6th AA Divisions broke up the attacks but Kenley and Biggin Hill were badly hit. The following day a raid up the Thames estuary reached the edge of the London IAZ and were engaged by the 26th AA Brigade. Between 11 and 15 September, massed raids approached London, but running battles with RAF fighters broke up most of the raids before they reached the IAZ, where they were engaged by the 48th AA Brigade.

== The Blitz ==
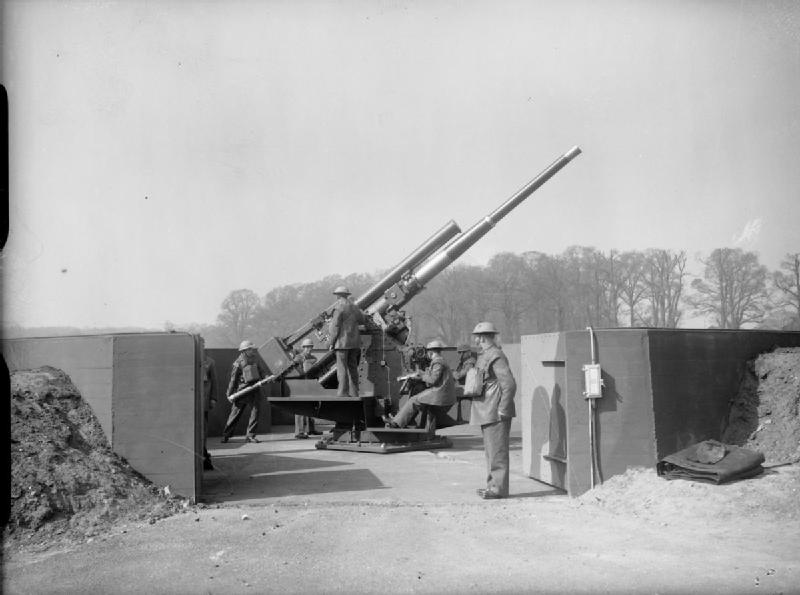
3.7-inch gun in Richmond Park 1940

By 30 September, when the Battle of Britain was effectively over and the Luftwaffe had switched to night raids over London (The Blitz), by now the 1st AA Division had 233 HAA guns, 60 LAA guns, 161 LMGs and 242 searchlights covering the London IAZ, together with 36 HAA guns defending Slough, Langley, Weybridge and airfields.

In the absence of inland radar coverage, the 1st AA Division's Chief Signals Officer, Lt-Col G.C. Wickens, devised a system of 14 fixed base-lines of sound locators to detect night raids approaching the IAZ. These were linked by automatic telephone equipment to the Brompton operations room, where the angular plots were resolved to indicate grid squares where the HAA guns in range could fire an unseen barrage. This 'Fixed Azimuth' system came into action in June 1940, in time for the opening of the night Blitz on London. It was later replaced as searchlight control (SLC) and gunlaying (GL) radar systems were introduced.

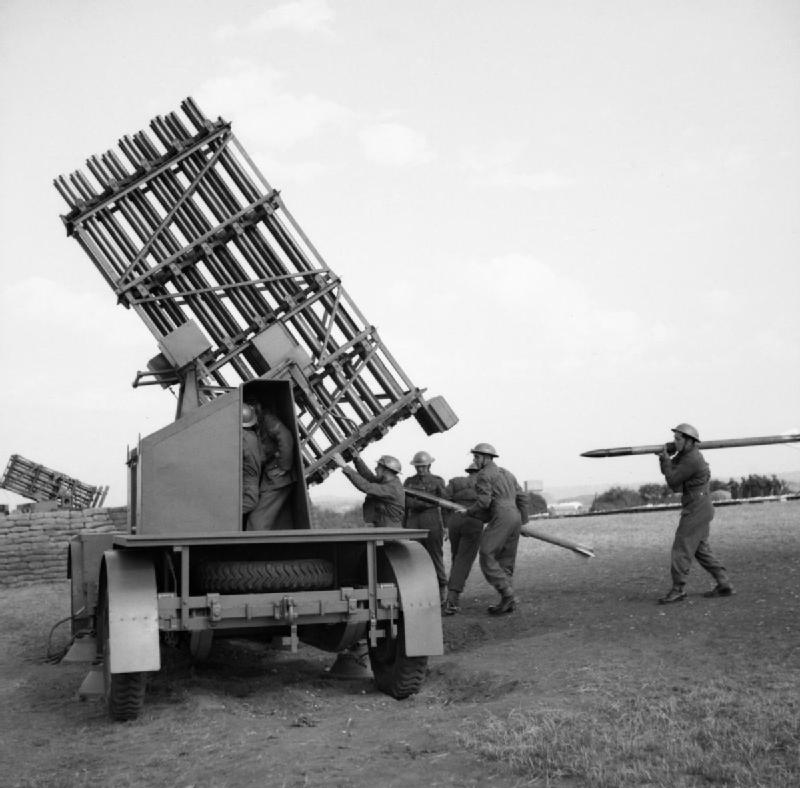
Loading a mobile Z Battery projector

However, the performance of the AA defences in the early weeks of the Blitz was poor. AA Command moved 108 HAA guns to the IAZ from other divisions, and arranged 'fighter nights' when the guns remained silent and RAF night fighters were allowed to operate over London with the searchlights. GL radar, modern sound-locators and larger (150 cm) searchlights were introduced as rapidly as possible. From September 1940, rocket projectors (Z Batteries) were introduced, equipped with rocket projectiles, and by February 1941, SLC began to be issued. The number of raiders shot down steadily increased until mid-May 1941, when the Luftwaffe scaled down its attacks. During 1941 increasing numbers of women of the Auxiliary Territorial Service (ATS) took over roles in AA Command. Where they were integrated into units these were designated 'Mixed' ('M').

== Mid-war ==
Towards the end of 1940, at the height of The Blitz, AA Command formed three AA Corps: the 1st AA Division formed part of I AA Corps in Southern England.

=== Order of Battle 1941–1942 ===
From this time the 1st AA Division's composition was,

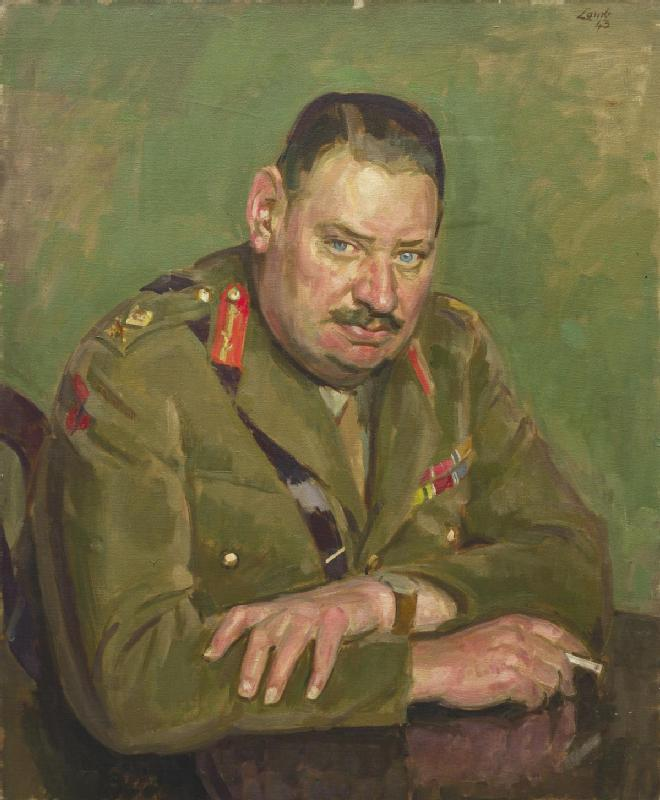
Maj-Gen Robert Whittaker, OBE, TD, GOC 1st AA Division 1940–41.

- GOC: Major-General Robert Whittaker (12 November 1940 – 31 December 1941)
- 26th AA Brigade – part of London IAZ
- Brigadier S.K. Thorburn (12 November 1940 – 19 February 1943)
  - 4th HAA Regiment, RA – a Regular unit returned from Dunkirk; left in June 1941 for West Africa Command and the Malta garrison
  - 52nd (London) HAA Regiment, RA (TA) – left Summer 1941 for the 9th AA Division
  - 86th (HAC) HAA Regiment, RA (TA) – rejoined by February 1941; to the 49th AA Brigade late 1941
  - 119th HAA Regiment, RA (TA) – formed December 1940; left by May 1941 for the 8th AA Division
  - 62nd LAA Regiment, RA (TA) – formed October 1940; left in June 1942 for the 9th AA Division
  - 6th AA Z Regiment, RA – formed September 1940
  - 88th HAA Regiment, TA (TA) – rejoined from the 9th AA Division by May 1941, left in June 1941 for Middle East Forces
  - 105th HAA Regiment, RA (TA) – joined from the 48th AA Brigade Summer 1941; returned Autumn 1941
  - 84th (Middlesex, London Transport) HAA Regiment, RA (TA) – joined from the 49th AA Brigade Summer 1941; left Winter 1941 for the 6th AA Division
  - 120th HAA Regiment, RA (TA) – formed January 1941; joined Summer 1941
  - 132nd (M) HAA Regiment, RA (TA) –formed September 1941
  - 156th (M) HAA Regiment, RA (TA) – formed April 1942
- 38th LAA Brigade – London S/L layout
  - 26th (London Electrical Engineers) S/L Regiment, RA (TA)
  - 35th (First Surrey Rifles) S/L Regiment, RA (TA) – to the 5th AA Division Summer 1941
  - 75th S/L Regiment– converted into the 75th LAA Regiment February 1941 and joined the 8th AA Division
  - 79th S/L Regiment, RA (TA) – formed October 1940
  - 63rd (Queens) S/L Regiment, RA (TA) – joined Autumn 1941 from the 5th AA Division; converted into the 127th (Queens) LAA Regt March 1942 and remained with brigade
- 48th AA Brigade– part of London IAZ
  - 54th (City of London) HAA Regiment, RA (TA)
  - 97th (London Scottish) HAA Regiment, RA (TA) – to the 49th AA Brigade Autumn 1941
  - 105th HAA Regiment, RA (TA) – formed September 1940; to the 26th AA Brigade Summer 1941; returned Autumn 1941
  - 53rd (City of London) HAA Regiment RA (TA) – rejoined from the 6th AA Division February 1941; as a mobile regiment, it was part of the War Office (WO) reserve, and left in October 1941 to deploy to India
  - 109th HAA Regiment, RA (TA) – from the 49th AA Brigade December 1941; to the 26th AA Brigade by May 1942
  - 1st AA Z Regiment, RA – formed September 1940
  - 14th AA Z Regiment, RA – formed September 1941
  - 141st (M) HAA Regiment, RA (TA) – formed December 1941; to the 49th AA Brigade January 1942
  - 163rd (M) HAA Regiment, RA (TA) – formed June 1942;
- 49th AA Brigade – part of London IAZ
  - 84th (Middlesex, London Transport) HAA Regiment, RA (TA)– to the 26th AA Brigade Summer 1941
  - 109th HAA Regiment, RA (TA) – formed September 1940; to the 48th AA Brigade December 1941; returned June 1942
  - 11th (City of London Yeomanry) LAA Regiment, RA (TA)– transferred to WO Reserve Summer 1941
  - 36th LAA Regiment, RA (TA)– to the 8th AA Division by May 1941
  - 42nd LAA Regiment, RA (TA)– from the 11th AA Division by May 1941
  - 70th LAA Regiment, RA (TA) – formed January 1941
  - 53rd (City of London) HAA Regiment – rejoined July 1940 after return from France via Gibraltar; left for the 6th AA Division October 1940 (see above)
  - 73rd LAA Regiment, RA (TA)– formed February 1941
  - 57th (Wessex) HAA Regiment, RA, (TA) – from the 5th AA Division Autumn 1941; to the 11th AA Division January 1942
  - 97th (London Scottish) HAA Regiment, RA (TA) – from the 48th AA Brigade Autumn 1941
  - 141st (M) HAA Regiment, RA (TA– from the 48th AA Brigade January 1942
  - 86 (HAC) HAA Regiment, RA (TA) – from the 26th AA Brigade February–March 1942
- 1st AA Divisional Mixed Signals, RCS
  - No 1 Company:
    - 1st AA Command Mixed Signal Office Section
    - 1st AA Division Mixed Signal Office Section
    - 26th AA Brigade Signal Office Mixed Sub-Section
    - 38th AA Brigade Signal Office Mixed Sub-Section
    - 48th AA Brigade Signal Office Mixed Sub-Section
    - 49th AA Brigade Signal Office Mixed Sub-Section
  - No 2 Company:
    - 601st AA Gun Operations Room (Class 'D') Mixed Signal Section
    - 315th AA Gun Operations Room (Class 'B') Mixed Signal Section
    - 112th RAF Fighter Sector Sub-Section
    - 5th AA Line Maintenance Section
- 1st AA Divisional RASC
  - 900th and 902nd Companies
- 1st AA Divisional Royal Army Medical Corps (RAMC)
- 1st AA Divisional Workshop Company, Royal Army Ordnance Corps (RAOC) – Workshop companies became part of the new Royal Electrical and Mechanical Engineers (REME) during 1942)
- 1st AA Divisional Radio Maintenance Company, RAOC

The 1st AA Division became independent, leaving I AA Corps and coming directly under AA Command, during April 1942.

== Disbandment ==
The 1st AA Division, like the other AA Corps and Divisions, was disbanded and replaced on 1 October 1942 by a new AA Group structure. London was covered by the 1st AA Group.

== General officers commanding ==
The following officers commanded the 1st AA Division:

- Major-General R.H.D. Thompson (15 December 1935 – 26 November 1936)
- Major-General Sir Frederick Pile (27 November 1937 – 27 July 1939) – became GOC-in-C AA Command
- Major-General Francis Crossman (28 July 1939 – 11 November 1940) – became GOC of the 2nd AA Division
- Major-General Robert Whittaker (12 November 1940 – 31 December 1941) – TA officer, former commander of the 26th (London) AA Brigade; became Major-General General Staff, AA Command
- Acting Major-General Darcy Richards (1 January – 30 September 1942) – became commander of the 25th AA Brigade in Tunisia and Italy

== See also ==
- List of British divisions in World War II
- Structure of the British Army in 1939
