= John Sanders (architect) =

John Sanders (1768–1826) was an architect and the first pupil of Sir John Soane taken on 1 September 1784. Sanders was born on 12 April 1768, the son of Thomas Sanders, a tallow-chandler of the parish of St Dunstan-in-the-East, London. He died at Reigate, Surrey early in 1826.

Sanders' principal buildings are the Duke of York's Headquarters at Chelsea, now home to the Saatchi Gallery (1801–03) and the Royal Military College Sandhurst (1808–12).

Sanders was the first president of the Architects' and Antiquaries' Club.

== Sources and further reading ==
- Arnold, Dana (2002). Reading Architectural History. London: Routledge. p. not stated. ISBN 0-415-25050-1.
- Colvin, H.M. (2008) [1978]. A Biographical Dictionary of British Architects, 1600-1840 (4th ed.). New Haven: Yale University Press. pp. not stated. ISBN 978-0-300-12508-5.
