= 79th Searchlight Regiment, Royal Artillery =

79th Searchlight Regiment, RA
- Royal Artillery cap badge
- Active: 4 October 1940 – 10 December 1944
- Country: United Kingdom
- Branch: British Army
- Type: Searchlight Regiment
- Role: Air Defence
- Size: 3–4 Batteries
- Part of: 1st Anti-Aircraft Division; 1 Anti-Aircraft Group; 2 Anti-Aircraft Group
- Engagements: London Blitz; Baby Blitz; Operation Diver

79th Searchlight Regiment (79th S/L Rgt) was an air defence unit of Britain's Royal Artillery during World War II. It protected London and South East England as part of Anti-Aircraft Command from the Blitz of 1940 until Operation Diver in 1944, after which it was disbanded.

== Origin ==
90 cm 'Projector Anti-Aircraft', displayed at Fort Nelson, Hampshire.

The regiment was created as part of the rapid expansion of anti-aircraft (AA) defences during The Blitz. It was formed on 4 October 1940 with three batteries numbered 502, 503 and 504. After training, the new regiment joined 38th Light AA Brigade in 1st Anti-Aircraft Division defending London.

1 AA Divisional formation sign, worn 1940–42.

== The Blitz ==
By the time 79th S/L Rgt joined, the London Blitz was in full swing, with nightly air raids on the city. The role of the S/L units was to track and illuminate raiders for the Heavy AA (HAA) guns of the Inner Artillery Zone (IAZ) and for the few available Royal Air Force Night fighters. The performance of the AA defences in the early weeks of the Blitz was poor. AA Command moved 108 HAA guns to the IAZ from other divisions, and arranged 'fighter nights' when the guns remained silent and the night fighters were allowed to operate over London with the searchlights. Better sound-locators and larger (150 cm) searchlights were introduced as rapidly as possible, and by February 1941 Searchlight Control (SLC or 'Elsie') radar began to be issued. The number of raiders shot down steadily increased until mid-May 1941, when the Luftwaffe scaled down its attacks, now considered as the end of the Blitz.

== Mid-War ==
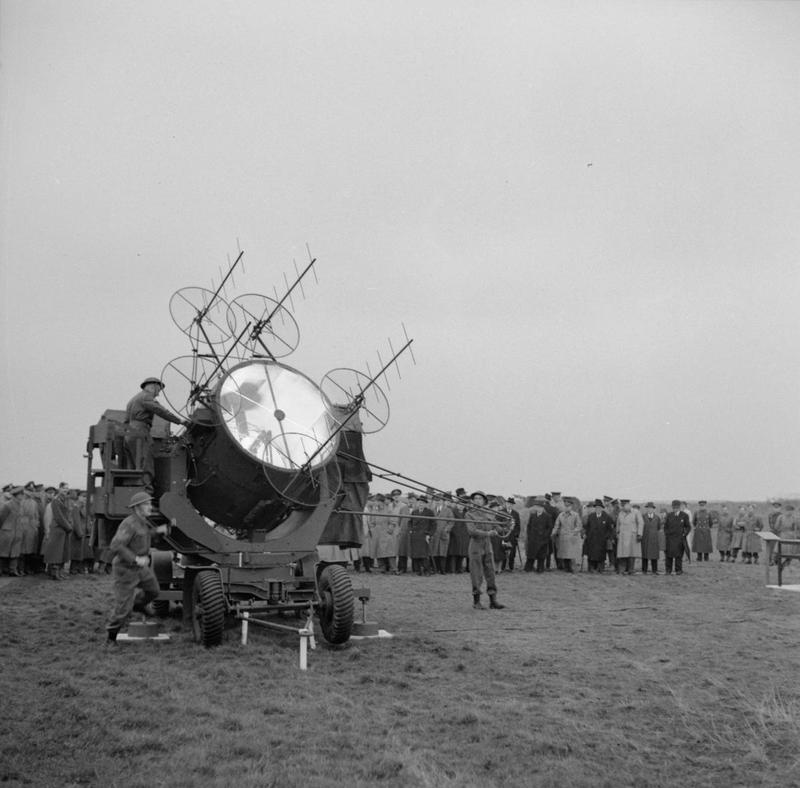
150 cm Searchlight fitted with No. 2 Mk VI SLC radar or 'Elsie'.

79th Searchlight Rgt remained with 38th AA Bde throughout the middle years of the war. On 23 January 1942 the regiment took over 342 S/L Bty from 35th (First Surrey Rifles) S/L Rgt which was due to convert to the light AA gun role.

Because of growing manpower shortages, the Commander-in-Chief of AA Command, Gen Sir Frederick 'Tim' Pile, pioneered the employment of women of the Auxiliary Territorial Service (ATS) in AA units. On 25 October 1942 a new predominantly female searchlight regiment was formed, 93rd (Mixed) Searchlight Regiment, to which 79th S/L Rgt supplied 342 Battery. Although 342 Bty was mainly male (it had begun converting to 'Mixed' on 4 August), there was a wholesale transfer of ATS personnel in, and male gunners out after it had been transferred.

A reorganisation of AA Command in October 1942 saw the AA divisions disbanded and replaced by a smaller number of AA Groups more closely aligned with the groups of RAF Fighter Command. Thus 1st AA Division was converted into 1 AA Group, still responsible for the London IAZ, but with the added responsibility for the 'Thames North' and 'Thames South' gun zones either side of the Thames Estuary.

However, in November 38 AA Bde was reorganised with the addition of HAA and LAA gun units rather than being a 'Light' AA brigade primarily controlling searchlights. In January 1943 the brigade together with 79th and 93rd (M) S/L Rgts came under the command of 2 AA Group covering South East England outside London.

Between 21 January and 14 March 1944 the Luftwaffe carried out 11 night raids on London in the so-called 'Baby Blitz'. As they crossed South East England these raids were met by intense AA fire and RAF night fighters, which scored an impressive number of 'kills' in conjunction with radar-controlled S/Ls.

== Operation Diver ==
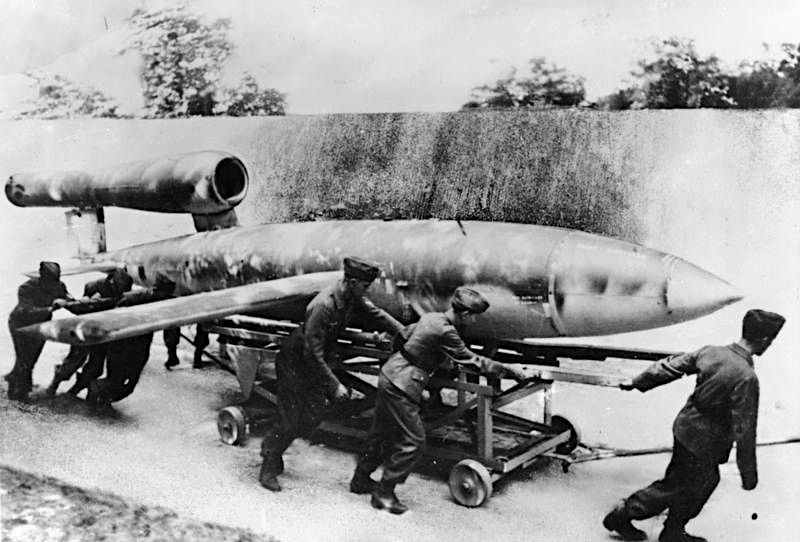
A Luftwaffe crew prepares a V-1 for launch.

Meanwhile, AA Command had been given the responsibility for protecting the embarkation ports for Operation Overlord, the Allied invasion of Normandy, while at the same time intelligence indicated that the Germans could start launching V-1 flying bombs against London at any time. AA Command began reorganising the AA defences of the South Coast, including thickening up the S/L belts as part of Operation Diver against the V1s. 79th Searchlight Rgt was first transferred to 47th AA Bde, and then to 27th (Home Counties) AA Bde, which took responsibility for the S/L defences across Southern England for 2 AA Group.

The beginning of the V-1 campaign against London came on 13 June, a week after Overlord was launched on D Day, and Operation Diver was put into immediate effect. The S/L positions had been established at 3,000 yards (2,700 m) intervals to cooperate with RAF night fighters, and each position also had a Bofors 40 mm light AA gun. After a poor start the guns and fighters began to gain a measure of control over the flying bombs, and by the end of the first phase of the operation, when 21st Army Group overran the launch sites in Northern France in September, 1800 night fighter interceptions had been achieved, of which 142 were due to S/L illumination. In the autumn the focus switched to East Anglia when the Luftwaffe began air-launching V-1s over the North Sea. This led to another major reorganisation, and in October 79th S/L Rgt transferred to 56th AA Bde commanding all the S/L units in 1 AA Group, which now controlled the 'Diver Box' covering the approaches to London from the east.

== Disbandment ==
By the end of 1944 AA Command was being forced to release manpower to 21st Army Group fighting in North West Europe and a number of AA regiments were disbanded or merged. 79th Searchlight Rgt and its three batteries, 502, 503 and 504, began disbanding at Hatfield Peverel, near Chelmsford in Essex, on 10 December 1944, but the process was not completed until 10 May 1945, just after the end of the war in Europe.
