= 93rd Searchlight Regiment =

93rd Searchlight Regiment, RA
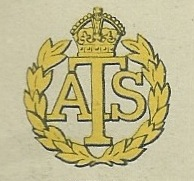
- Cap Badge of the Auxiliary Territorial Service
- Active: 25 October 1942 – 1 July 1945
- Country: United Kingdom
- Branch: British Army
- Type: Searchlight regiment
- Role: Air defence
- Part of: Anti-Aircraft Command

93rd Searchlight Regiment, Royal Artillery was an all-female British air defence unit during World War II, formed in October 1942 and disbanded in July 1945.

== History ==
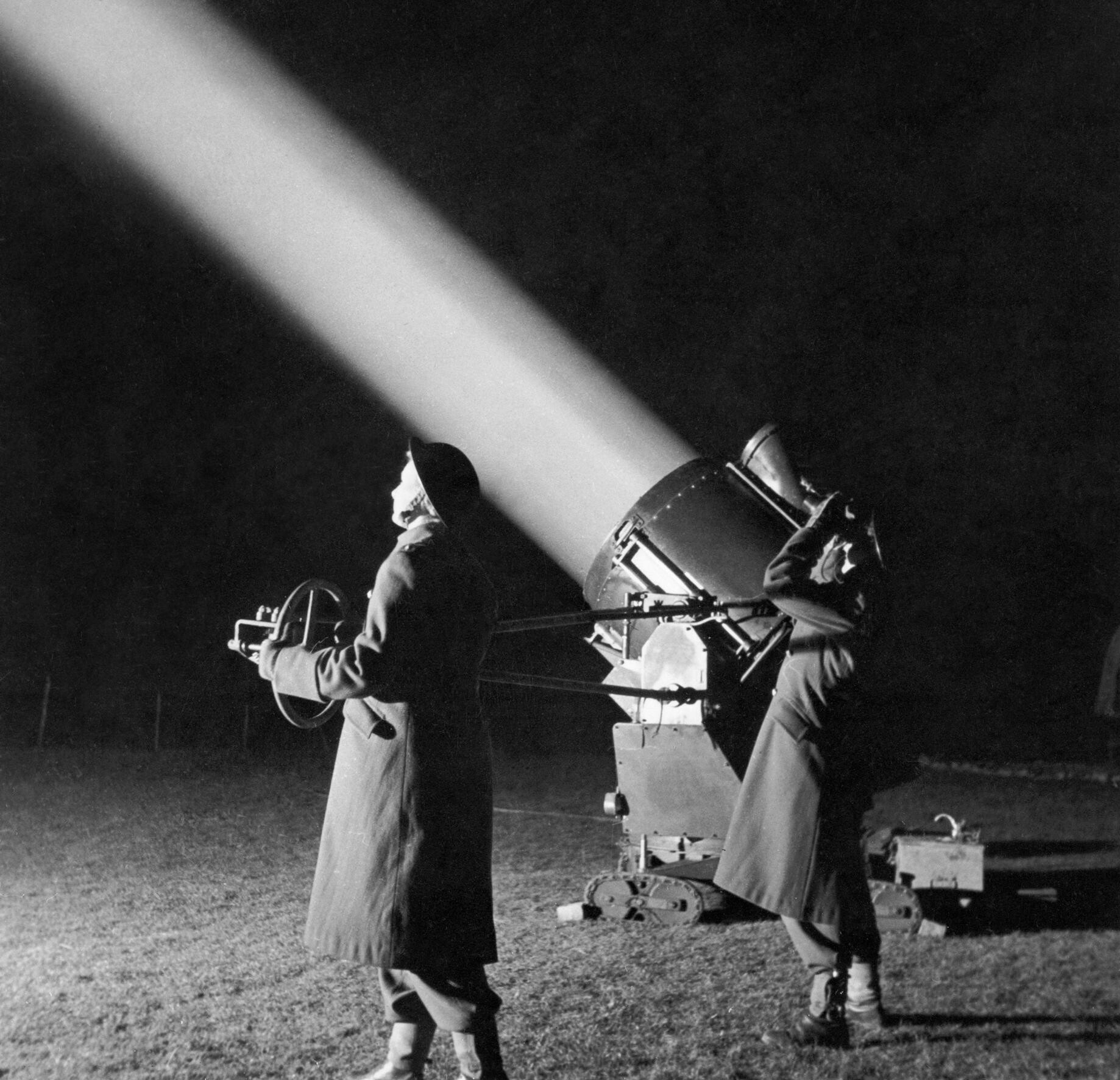
ATS Searchlight Unit 1940s

Searchlights were of great importance in the Second World War as they were needed to illuminate the German Bombers flying over Britain, so that the men operating the anti-aircraft guns could shoot them down before they had a chance to drop any bombs on the British towns and cities. A plan in 1935 anticipated 100 searchlight companies, with 2334 searchlights lights and 43,500 men.

However, by 1941 men were increasingly needed for deployment elsewhere and there was a risk that the number of anti-aircraft units might have to be reduced. The General Officer Commanding-in-Chief Anti-Aircraft Command 1939–1945, General Sir Frederick Pile, supported the employment of women of the Auxiliary Territorial Service (ATS) to these operational roles. They were first deployed to heavy anti-aircraft (HAA) gun units to work the AA instruments, radars and command posts. These 'Mixed' batteries were a success, but the replacement of men by women in searchlight (S/L) units was less easy to settle. The women would be scattered in small detachments in isolated conditions suffering hardship and few amenities. S/L sites were subject to enemy attack and usually had light machine guns for self-defence, but Defence Regulations prohibited women from firing them.

In 1941 a secret trial called the Newark experiment was carried out in AA Command to find out if women would be able to carry out the duties required in searchlight regiments. Fifty-four members of the ATS were sent for training at Rhyl to see if they could cope with working in isolated places and if they would have the strength and the ability to operate the searchlights. The experiment proved successful and General Pile later wrote that: "They showed themselves more effective, more horror inspiring and more blood-thirsty with their pick-helves than many a male sentry with his gun, as several luckless gentlemen found to their cost". General Pile was also to write later, "The girls lived like men, fought their lights like men and, alas, some of them died like men". General Pile also proposed that the women should have a more practical uniform for this work, and should be given the same rates of pay as the men if they were doing the same job. On 2 December 1941, the Under Secretary of State in the War Office wrote a letter recommending that members of the ATS be deployed in searchlight duties. In July 1942 the first seven searchlight troops were formed with ATS members and these were posted to 26th Searchlight Regiment (London Electrical Engineers), which became the first Mixed searchlight regiment.

== 93rd (M) S/L Regiment ==
On 25 October 1942 the 93rd (Mixed) Searchlight Regiment was formed at Gerrards Cross, Buckinghamshire with 301, 342 and 495 Searchlight Batteries. The batteries came from 26th (Mixed) S/L Rgt, 79th S/L Rgt and 77th S/L Rgt, respectively. Apart from 301 Bty, which was already an all-female battery, the regiment was still 50 percent male when formed, but the wholesale transfer of ATS in, and male gunners out, started immediately: A and B (male) Troops of 495 S/L Bty were exchanged for A & B Trps of 339 Bty of 26th (Mixed) S/L Rgt. On 1 June 1943 C & D Trps of 495 S/L Bty were disbanded and replaced by ATS personnel, and finally 23 August 1943 D/342 Trp disbanded and was replaced by an ATS troop. By the time the regiment was fully converted in August 1943 there were approximately 1500 women in the regiment, apart from the Commanding Officer and the Battery OCs.

The regiment was deployed in 38th Light Anti-Aircraft Brigade, which was part of the defences of London. Later it moved to 47th AA Brigade defending Southampton.

== Insignia ==
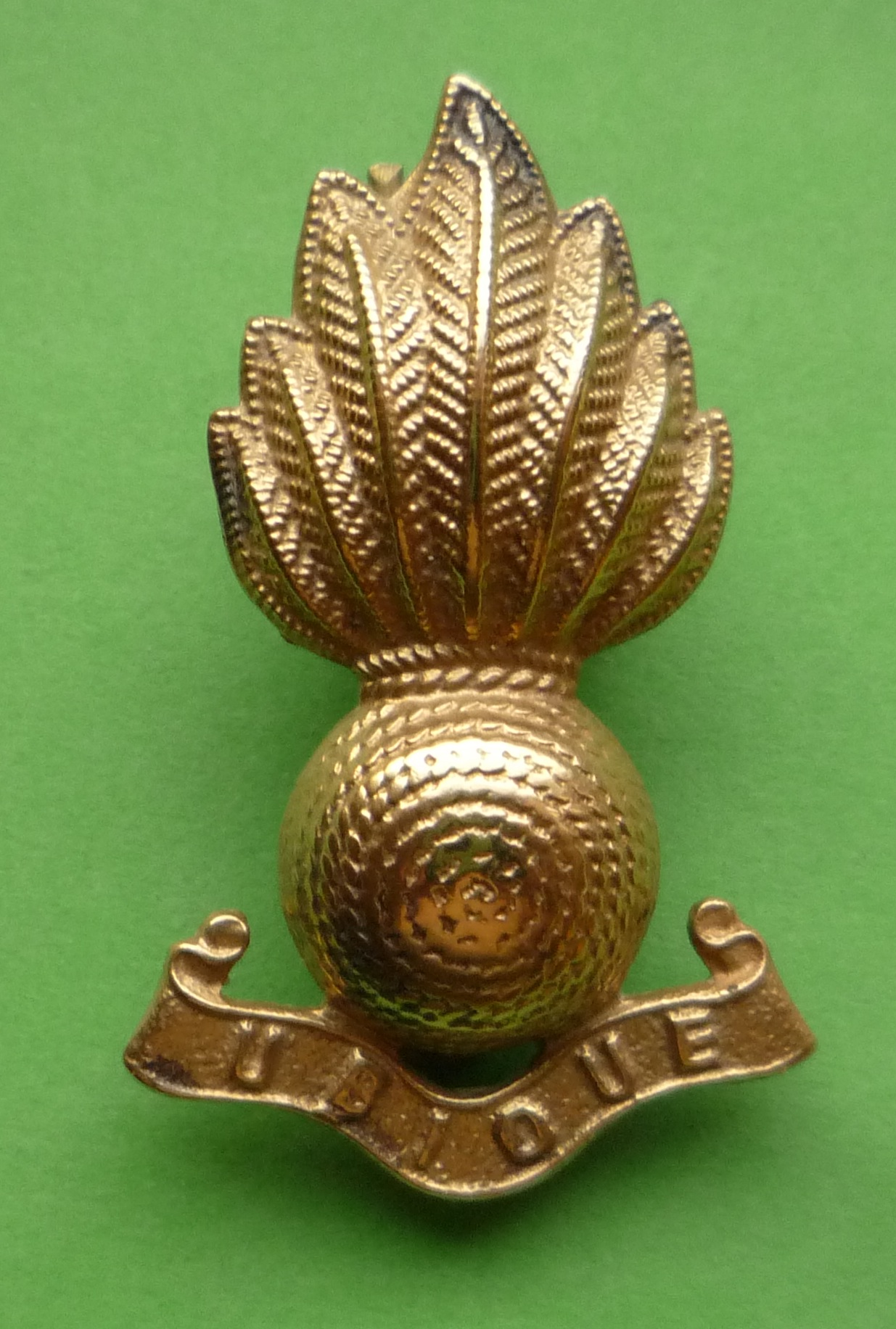
Brass collar badge of the Royal Artillery

Members of the ATS on the posted strength of Royal Artillery units wore the RA's 'grenade' collar badge above the left breast pocket of their uniform jacket.

== Disbandment ==
93 (M) SL Regt RA commenced disbandment at The Copse, Hamble, near Southampton, on 1 Jul 1945, and was completed by 29 July.

A reunion was organised at the Artillery Centre, Larkhill in 2005 to commemorate the 60th Anniversary of the disbandment of the Regiment. Forty-four women and two men from the Regiment attended together with the special guest, Dame Vera Lynn.

== External sources ==
- "History - Searchlight Operators". ATS Remembered.
- "Reunion 93rd Searchlight Rgt RA".
