= Duke of York's Headquarters =

Historic building in Chelsea, London

- Chelsea, London
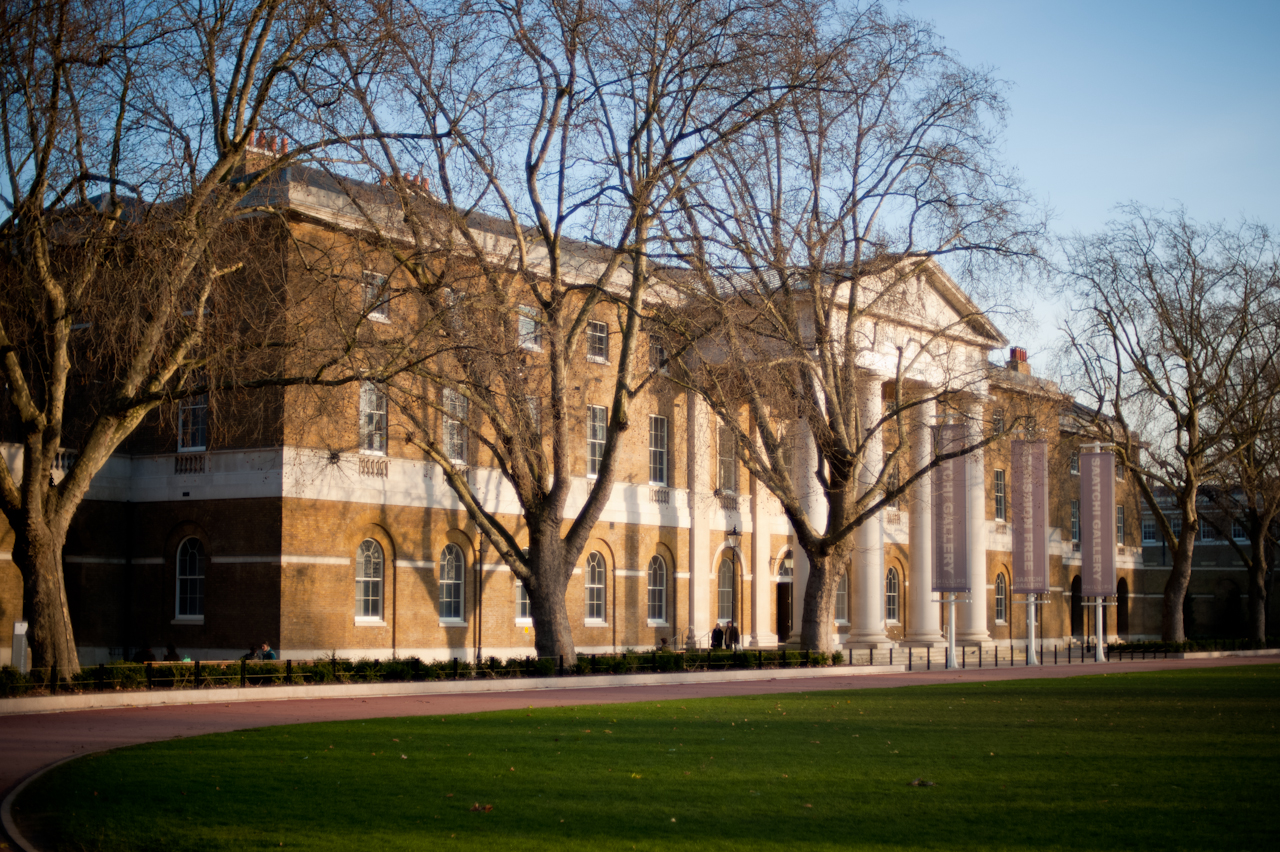
- The Duke of York's Headquarters in December 2009

Site information
- Type: Drill Hall

Location
- Location within London
- Coordinates: 51.4906°N 0.1589°W

Site history
- Built: 1801
- Built for: War Office
- Architect: John Sanders
- In use: 1801–present

The Duke of York's Headquarters is a building in Chelsea in the Royal Borough of Kensington and Chelsea, England. In 1969 it was declared a listed building at Grade II*, due to its outstanding historic or architectural special interest.

== History ==
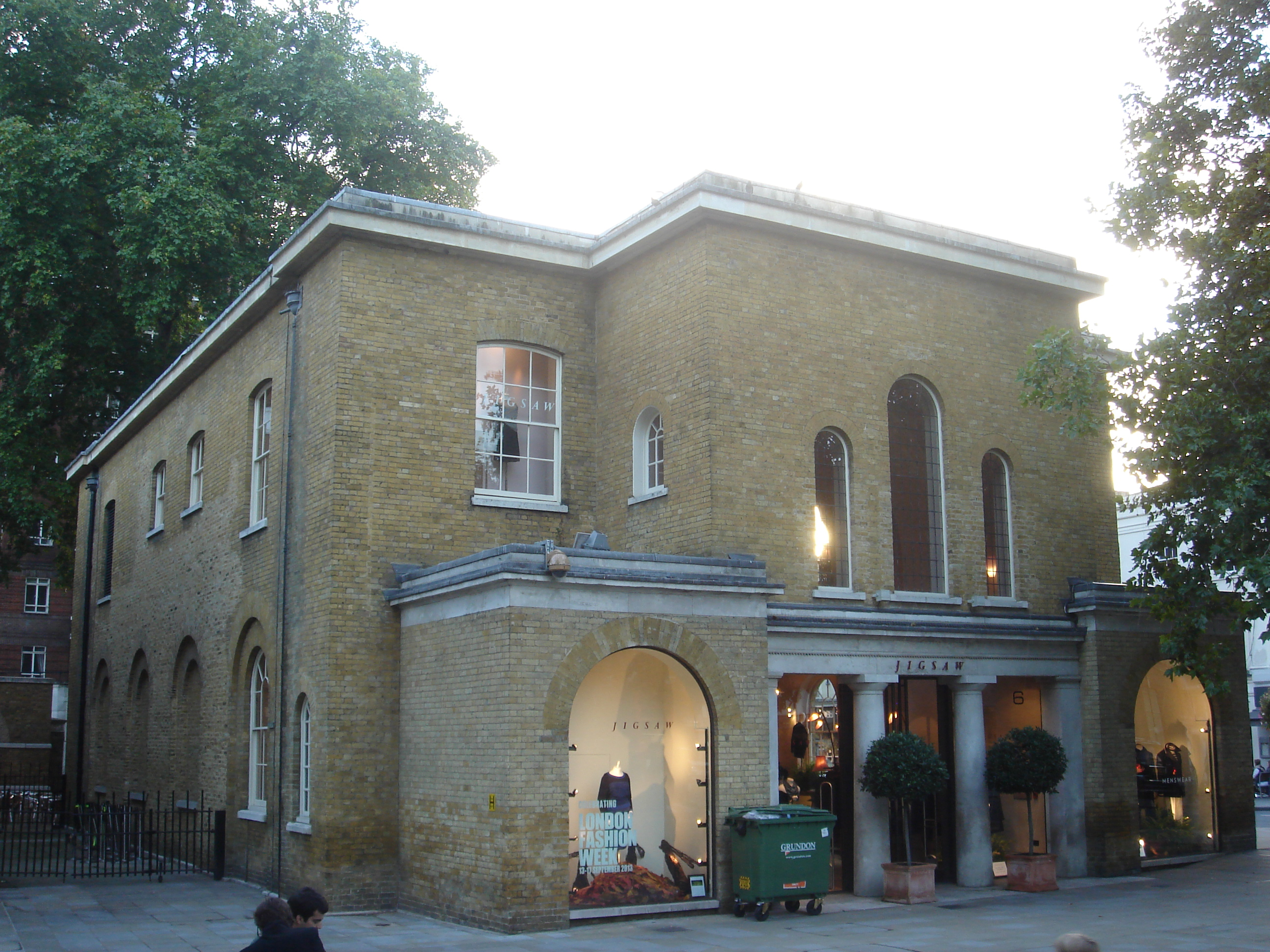
Chapel to Duke of York's Headquarters, 2013

The building was completed in 1801 to the designs of John Sanders, who also designed the Royal Military Academy Sandhurst. It was originally called the Royal Military Asylum and was a school for the children of soldiers' widows. In 1892 it was renamed the Duke of York's Royal Military School. In 1909, the school moved to new premises in Dover, and the Asylum building was taken over by the Territorial Army and renamed the Duke of York's Barracks in 1911. During the First World War it was the headquarters of the 18th (County of London) Battalion, London Regiment (London Irish Rifles) and of the Middlesex Yeomanry.

During the Second World War, the courts martial of German spies, Josef Jakobs and Theodore Schurch, (both tried under the Treachery Act 1940) were both conducted in the building.

On 20 September 1973 a Provisional IRA bomb exploded at the barracks injuring five people, three civilians and two soldiers, at which time it was the headquarters of the 14th Parachute Brigade (TA).

In 1980 the building was extensively restored and renovated, with the £1.5 million programme being carried out by Donald Insall Associates. At that time the building served as the Headquarters for the Territorial Army in Greater London, and as the home of Territorial units 144 Parachute Field Ambulance RAMC(V), 257 (Southern) General Hospital RAMC, 21 Special Air Service Regiment (Artists), and companies of 10th Battalion, Parachute Regiment and the London Irish Rifles. In addition, it served as the headquarters of the Royal Corps of Signals and First Aid Nursing Yeomanry, and as the home of the Coldstream Guards Band, and a Light Aid Detachment of the Royal Electrical and Mechanical Engineers. It also housed the offices of the RAF Escaping Society, the Army Historical Association, the Army Benevolent Fund, and the Soldiers, Sailors and Airmen's Families Association.

On 16 March 1992, Jack the Ripper Stalks His Victims, the first collection by British designer Alexander McQueen, was produced at the Duke of York's Barracks, as the thesis collection for his master's degree in fashion at Central Saint Martins (CSM) art school.

In 1998, the government made the chapel, which was built in 1824, available for commercial development. The chapel went on to become Soho Home Studio, a furniture and homewares store and cafe, run by Soho House.

The site was sold to Cadogan Estates by the Ministry of Defence, with initial proceeds of £66 million received in 2000 and a further £28 million when the site was vacated in 2003. Cadogan has redeveloped the site with Paul Davis and Partners as Duke of York Square. The development includes a public square, upmarket housing and retail outlets, and part of it has been let as new premises for the Saatchi Gallery, which relocated there in 2008.

Hill House School, a prep school based in and around the Royal Borough of Kensington and Chelsea, uses the field of the Barracks for regular 'games' (sports and activities practices) and for their annual end-of-year 'field day'. Garden House, another prep school based in the Royal Borough, occupies the Cavalry House, part of the Duke of York's Headquarters on Turks Row, which became a grade II listed building in July 1998.
