= Leeds Rifles =

- Active: From 1859
- Country: United Kingdom
- Branch: Territorial Army
- Role: Infantry, armour, anti-aircraft artillery
- Size: 2 Territorial Battalions Up to 2 Second Line Territorial Battalions Up to 2 Reserve Battalions
- Garrison/HQ: Carlton Barracks, Leeds
- Anniversaries: Bligny (28 July)
- Decorations: Croix de Guerre; Maple Leaf

Commanders
- Notable commanders: Brigadier Noel Tetley

The Leeds Rifles was a unit of the 19th century Volunteer Force of the British Army that went on to serve under several different guises in the World Wars of the 20th century. In the First World War, both battalions served as infantry on the Western Front. They were later converted into an anti-aircraft and tank units, and fought in North Africa, Italy, and Burma during the Second World War.

== Origin ==
When a call was issued for the formation of local Rifle Volunteer Corps in 1859, the City of Leeds in the West Riding of Yorkshire responded enthusiastically. A unit calling itself the Leeds Rifles was quickly raised with support from the city's business leaders. It was claimed that the whole of 'A' Company was recruited from employees of Joshua Tetley & Son's brewery, beginning a long association between the Tetley family and the regiment. The Leeds Rifles was accepted as the 11th Yorkshire West Riding Rifle Volunteer Corps, with the first commissions being issued to its officers by the Lord Lieutenant of the West Riding of Yorkshire on 17 November 1859. In May 1860, it absorbed the less-successful 22nd (Leeds) Yorkshire West Riding RVC, and the combined battalion-sized unit was renumbered the 7th West Riding RVC. Its first headquarters was next to Leeds Town Hall. (Separately, the city also raised the 1st (Leeds) Yorkshire West Riding Artillery Volunteer Corps on 2 August 1860 and 2nd West Riding (Leeds) Engineer Volunteer Corps formed on 21 May 1861.)

== Nineteenth century ==
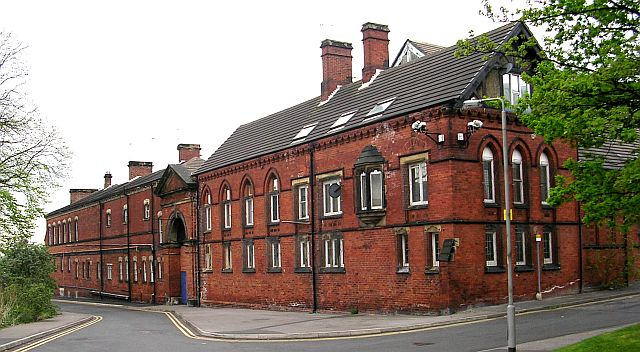
Carlton Barracks, Leeds

Government funding for the RVCs was strictly limited, and they had to rely upon members' subscriptions and the generosity of their officers. Captain Thomas Kinnear of the Leeds Rifles, a partner in the textile firm Benjamin Gott & Son, lent over £1,100 of his own money to offset the unit's debts. In 1866, he sent a circular to other RVCs that revealed the level of dissatisfaction around the country about the insufficiency of the government grant, but despite strong support for the Volunteer movement in Parliament, funding was not increased.

The primary purpose of the RVCs was home defence, but their enthusiastic members often volunteered for service overseas in other units. At least three members of the Leeds Rifles volunteered to serve in the unofficial British Legion that went to fight with Giuseppe Garibaldi in his 1860 campaign in Naples. Officers from the Leeds Rifles apparently served in Captain Watt Whalley's Natal Light Horse in the Anglo-Zulu War.

As part of the 1881 Childers Reforms, the Leeds Rifles was attached to its local county regiment, the Prince of Wales's Own (West Yorkshire Regiment), formally becoming that regiment's 3rd Volunteer Battalion in 1887. This was despite an offer from the War Office to join a different regiment, a dispute that ran for several years. As part of the compromise, the Leeds Rifles retained their Rifle green uniforms, despite the West Yorkshires being a redcoated regiment. The Leeds Rifles was sufficiently large to purchase Carlton Barracks, the old militia barracks at Carlton Hill in Leeds, and modernise it as its Regimental HQ.

During the Second Boer War, the Leeds Rifles raised two service companies to supplement the Regular Army on campaign. As a result, the Leeds Rifles was awarded South Africa 1900–1902 as its first battle honour.

== Territorials ==
When the Territorial Force was created in 1908, the Volunteer Battalions became Territorial Battalions of their linked regiments. The 1st and 2nd (V) Bns became 5th and 6th Bns of the West Yorkshires, while 3rd (V) Bn became 7th and 8th (Leeds Rifles), a double battalion of the West Yorkshires with RHQ at Carlton Barracks. The four battalions formed the West Yorkshire Brigade in the TF.

== First World War ==
On the outbreak of the First World War, the West Yorkshire Brigade mobilised as 146th Brigade in 49th (West Riding) Infantry Division. The First Line TF battalions soon raised duplicate battalions (2/7th 15 September, 2/8th 14 September), initially for home service, which constituted 185th Brigade in 62nd (2nd West Riding) Division. In 1915 they formed further reserve battalions (3/7th 15 March, 3/8th, 13 March) that served in the British Isles. On 8 April 1916 the 3rd Line battalions were redesignated Reserve battalions, and on 1 September 1916, 7th Reserve Bn absorbed the 8th Reserve Bn. 7th Reserve Bn served in the West Riding Reserve Brigade, and in the summer of 1918 this battalion was sent to Ireland. (In addition, the City of Leeds raised two battalions for Kitchener's Army: the 15th West Riding (1st Leeds) was known as the 'Leeds Pals', and the 17th West Riding (2nd Leeds) was a 'Bantam' battalion.)

=== Battalions in 1st West Riding Division ===
146 Brigade landed at Boulogne on 15 April 1915 and served in 49th (West Riding) Division on the Western Front for the rest of the war. 49 Division had a peripheral role in the British attack on Aubers Ridge, 9 May 1915, soon after its arrival at the front. Much more serious was the German attack of 19 December 1915 on the British line between Frezenberg and Boesinghe (Boezinge) on the Northern side of the Ypres Salient. The Germans employed phosgene gas for the first time, delivered by shells instead of a cloud released from cylinders. The British line stood firm, despite heavy casualties from gas and shellfire.

On 1 July 1916, the first day of the Battle of the Somme, 49 Division was in X Corps' reserve. During the morning, 146 Bde was ordered to move to Thiepval Wood to support the 32nd and 36th Divisions who had attacked at Zero. This move entailed crossing a swamp by two duckboarded causeways: 1/7th and 1/8th Leeds Rifles took the North causeway. They came under German machine-gun fire and had to cross in small parties, but by 11.35 am the brigade was in the assembly trenches in Thiepval Wood. The brigade was put at the disposal of 36th (Ulster) Division, which had gained some success at the Schwaben Redoubt, and was ordered to make a frontal assault on Thiepval village at 4.00 pm. However, due to congestion in the trenches, only the 1/6th Bn and one company of 1/8th Leeds Rifles were in position to attack. Their lines were swept by machine-gun fire from Thiepval Fort, and the survivors were withdrawn into reserve and the rest of the attack cancelled. But 36th Division had been promised support, so two companies of 1/7th Leeds Rifles advanced. It was not until 9.00 pm that the rest of the Leeds Rifles went forward and began to reach Schwaben Redoubt, but it was too late and the Ulstermen were forced to abandon the position about 10.30 pm.

However, a 30-man party of 1/7th Leeds Rifles got left behind in the redoubt, and held out for two more days under the command of Corporal George Sanders until it could be withdrawn. Sanders was awarded the Victoria Cross for this exploit, and was later commissioned as an officer.

For much of the war, the 1st West Riding Division was involved in static trench warfare, holding parts of the notorious Ypres Salient. In July 1917 it was withdrawn to begin training for an amphibious operation against the German U-boat bases on the Belgian Coast (Operation Hush), but this was cancelled after a German spoiling attack and the opening failure of the British Army's Third Ypres Offensive.

Later, the Yorkshiremen were fed into the later stages of Third Ypres under the command of II ANZAC Corps. On 9 October 1917, 49th and the untried 66th (2nd East Lancashire) Divisions of II ANZAC attacked along two parallel ridges towards the village of Passchendaele (the Battle of Poelcappelle). Although recent British attacks had been successful, 49th's 'attempt to advance was marked by one mishap after another'. The artillery preparation was poor, hampered by the mud. The two attacking brigades barely reached their jumping-off line on time, covered with mud from the approach march through the swampy ground, and 'looking like men who had been buried alive and then dug up again'. In trying to advance, they found that the Ravebeke stream – marked as 5 feet wide on their maps – had swollen to 150 feet across. The other brigade failed to cross it, leaving the West Yorkshires of 146 Bde to advance alone. They managed a few hundred yards and then 'they were staggered by shrapnel and heavy machine-gun fire from pill-boxes on the higher ground ahead'. Next they encountered a wide belt of uncut barbed wire, followed by the belt of pillboxes, each surrounded by wire, which had to be attacked individually. Finally, the Yorkshiremen faced the main resistance from the rifles and light machine-guns of the Rhinelanders of the German 16th Infantry Division hidden among the hundreds of shell-holes in the front. By 10.00 am the advance had stalled, and in early afternoon, both brigades returned to their starting points. At the end of the day 49th Division had suffered 2585 casualties and had no net gains at all.

The casualties of 1916–17 led to a manpower crisis for the British Expeditionary Force and brigades had to be reduced from four to three battalions. On 30 January 1918, 1/8th Bn transferred from the 1st to the 2nd West Riding Division and absorbed 2/8th Bn, being renamed 8th Bn.

During the second great attack of the German spring offensive of 1918, the Lys Offensive, 49 Division fought at the Battles of Estaires, Messines, Bailleul (in which the division defended Neuve Eglise), 1st and 2nd Battles of Kemmel Ridge, and the Scherpenberg.

Following the defeat of the German 1918 offensives, 49 Division took part in the pursuit to the Selle and the subsequent Battle of the Selle and Battle of Valenciennes. 7th and 8th Battalion were disembodied on 26 June and 7 May 1919 respectively.

=== Battalions in 2nd West Riding Division ===
The Second Line Territorials were released for overseas service under the Military Service Act 1916. The two Leeds Rifles battalions of 185th (2/1st West Riding) Brigade landed at Le Havre in January 1917 and served in 62nd (2nd West Riding) Division on the Western Front for the rest of the war. That spring they took part in the operations on the Ancre (15 February–13 March), the follow-up of the German retreat to the Hindenburg Line (14–19 March), the First Battle of Bullecourt (11 April), the German attack on Lagnicourt (15 April), the Second Battle of Bullecourt (3–17 May) and the actions on the Hindenburg Line (20–28 May).

62 Division was not involved in the Ypres offensive of 1917, but in October 1917 it began training to cooperate with tanks in the forthcoming Battle of Cambrai. G Battalion Tank Corps was assigned to lead 185 Bde's assault when the attack began at dawn on 20 October. The division's first objective was Havrincourt on the Flesquières Ridge. It was a strong position, with the main Hindenburg Line position and several field-gun batteries hidden in dead ground, and several tanks were knocked out by direct hits before they penetrated the village with the West Yorkshires and overran the German Infanterie-Regiment von Manstein (1. Schleswigsches) Nr. 84 while the divisional reserve moved on to capture Graincourt-lès-Havrincourt. 62 Division could have gone on to take Bourlon Wood, but was held back because a neighbouring division was held up at Flesquières. A week later, 62 Division was sent in again with tank support to capture Bourlon Wood. This time 185 Bde formed the divisional reserve and was sent up to hold the meagre gains of the bloody fighting. Two days later, after the West Yorkshires had been withdrawn into reserve, a German counter-offensive recaptured almost all the gains of the previous fighting. In January 1918, 1/8th Leeds Rifles joined 185 Bde and merged with 2/8th to form a single 8th Bn. During the German Spring Offensive 62 Division was engaged at the First Battle of Bapaume (25 March) and the First Battle of Arras (28 March). On 26 March the division was heavily attacked but held its line. The following day the Germans tried to turn the division's flank at Rossignol Wood, and fighting continued through the night and into the following day.

2/7th Leeds Rifles was reduced to a cadre and absorbed into 18th (Service) Bn, York and Lancaster Regiment 16–19 June 1918, leaving 8th Leeds Rifles (having absorbed the 2/8th) as the only unit of the West Yorkshires remaining in the brigade by the end of August. In July, 62 Division was sent to assist the French army, and took part in the Battle of the Tardenois or 'Bligny Ridge' (part of the Second Battle of the Marne (20–30 July)). On 28 July the division captured Bligny against strong opposition, and the French awarded the Croix de Guerre to 8th Leeds Rifles for this action.

Extract of General Army Order No. 430

The General Commanding the Fifth Army cites in General Army Orders the 8th Battalion The Prince of Wales's Own (West Yorkshire Regiment) (Leeds Rifles). This élite Battalion under the forceful command of Lieutenant Colonel Norman Ayrton England, from 20 July to 30 July, took a brilliant part in the heavy fighting that won us the Valley of the River Ardre. On 23 July 1918, having cleared a path through the dense thickets of the Bois du Petit Champ, it captured a vital position despite continuous fire from enemy machine guns. On 28 July 1918 with magnificent spirit it captured the Montaigne de Bligny, strongly defended by enemy forces superior in number, and maintained the position in spite of heavy losses and the desperate efforts of the enemy to regain the ground. (GHQ Decision No. 22389 dated 16 October 1918.)

Signed Guillaumat General Officer Commanding V° Army.

This award was approved by King George V in November 1922:

Army Order Number 431

Grant of Honorary Distinction

His Majesty The King has been graciously pleased to approve of the officers, warrant officers, non-commissioned officers and men of the 8th (Leeds Rifles) Battalion The West Yorkshire Regiment (The Prince of Wales's Own) being permitted to wear in their headdresses on all ceremonial parades, a Cockade of the Colours of the French Croix de Guerre in commemoration of their exploits at La Montaigne de Bligny in 1918, for which they were 'cité' in the Orders of the 5th French Army.

This honorary distinction to the TA successors of the Leeds Rifle was confirmed by Queen Elizabeth II in 1968.

62 Division took part in the Hundred Days Offensive beginning in the summer of 1918, at the Battle of the Scarpe (26–30 August) and the Battle of the Drocourt-Quéant Line (2 September). 62 Division was back at Havrincourt on 12 September 1918 for the Battle of Havrincourt – the division was specially chosen because of its performance there in 1917. It then took part in the Battle of the Canal du Nord (27–30 September), and the Battle of the Selle (17–23 October), capture of Solesmes (20 October) and Battle of the Sambre (4 November) during the final advance in Picardy.

== Interwar reorganisation ==
The 7th and 8th Leeds Rifles were both reformed on 2 February 1920, and the TF was reconstituted as the Territorial Army in 1921. Both battalions continued to serve as part of the 146th (1st West Riding) Infantry Brigade of the 49th (West Riding) Infantry Division. The 7th Battalion was commanded by Lieutenant Colonel Charles Herbert Tetley, who had won a DSO during the war, and his cousin James Noel Tetley was one of the subalterns.

On 10 December 1936, the 8th (Leeds Rifles) Battalion was transferred to the Royal Artillery and was converted to the Anti-Aircraft (AA) role as 66th (Leeds Rifles, The West Yorkshire Regiment) Anti-Aircraft Brigade, forming part of 31st (North Midland) Anti-Aircraft Group, tasked with defending West Yorkshire in 2nd Anti-Aircraft Division. It consisted of HQ and 184th, 185th and 186th AA Batteries and 66th Machine Gun Battery (197th AA Bty from 1 May 1937). 186th Battery (at Oulton) left the regiment in April 1939 to help form a new 96th AA Regiment at Castleford.

In April 1938, the 7th (Leeds Rifles) Battalion converted to the armoured role as 45th (Leeds Rifles) Battalion, Royal Tank Regiment. In June 1939, the company at Morley was split off to form the cadre for a duplicate unit, the 51st (Leeds Rifles) Battalion, Royal Tank Regiment.

The TA's AA units were mobilised on 23 September 1938 during the Munich Crisis, with units manning their emergency positions within 24 hours, even though many did not yet have their full complement of men or equipment. The emergency lasted three weeks, and they were stood down on 13 October. In February 1939 the existing AA defences came under the control of a new Anti-Aircraft Command. On 1 April, 66th (Leeds Rifles) AA Regiment (as AA Brigades were termed from 1 January 1939) formed a new 296 AA Battery. On 4 April, 186 AA Bty left to help form a new 96th AA Regiment at Rotherham; 296 AA Bty was also transferred to this regiment shortly afterwards. In June 1939, as the international situation worsened, a partial mobilisation of the TA was begun in a process known as 'couverture', whereby each AA unit did a month's tour of duty in rotation to man selected AA gun and searchlight positions. On 24 August, ahead of the declaration of war, AA Command was fully mobilised at its war stations.

== Second World War ==
=== Mobilisation ===
66th (Leeds Rifles) AA Regiment mobilised as part of 31st AA Brigade (as groups were now termed), which was in the process of transferring to a new 7th Anti-Aircraft Division forming to defend North East England. 45th (Leeds Rifles) RTR formed part of 24th Army Tank Brigade (later 24th Armoured Brigade), a 2nd Line Territorial formation in Northern Command, in which it served alongside the Oldham TA regiments, 41 RTR and its duplicate, 47 RTR. Similarly, the duplicate Leeds battalion, 51 RTR, was in 25th Army Tank Brigade, also in Northern Command, alongside the Newcastle TA regiment, 43 RTR, and its duplicate 49 RTR.

=== 45th RTR ===
On the outbreak of war, 45 RTR was commanded by Lieutenant Colonel Noel Tetley. There were almost no armoured fighting vehicles available for the TA regiments, and the few possessed by 45 RTR were deployed for airfield defence in North East England during the Battle of Britain. Later in the year, 24th Army Tank Brigade was redesignated 24th Armoured Brigade and became part of a new 8th Armoured Division. During 1941, the regiment moved to the South of England to continue its training. In December 1941 Lt-Col Tetley was promoted out of the regiment to command a tank brigade, and was replaced by Lt-Col S.C. Dumbreck of the Royal Dragoons.

In May 1942, 45 RTR embarked at Liverpool for the Middle East, sailing round the Cape and reaching Egypt in July. There the crews began training on Grant tanks, but by September they were equipped with a mix of Sherman tanks (codenamed 'Swallows') and Crusaders (but apparently not to full establishment). 8th Armoured Division was not yet complete, so 24th Armoured Bde was attached to 10th Armoured Division for the forthcoming Second Battle of El Alamein.

45 RTR went into action alongside 41 and 47 RTR on the second day of the battle (D+1, 24 October), as 10th Armoured pushed towards Miteira. Its tanks engaged enemy anti-tank guns and entrenched infantry before withdrawing at dusk. The next day (D+2) 45 RTR moved into battle positions, supporting 41 and 47 RTR with gunfire. The enemy anti-tank guns were well dug in and had to be engaged by observing their flashes. One German infantry post was overrun by a troop of tanks firing their machine-guns into the trenches. The regiment withdrew again at dusk, leaving one defence squadron on the ridge. On D+3 there was confused fighting ahead of the regiment. During D+4, 45 RTR remained on the ridge all day, covering 41 and 47 RTR as they advanced through the gaps in the minefields. On the night of 27/28 October, the CO was ordered to advance at first light on D+5 to support an infantry brigade, but as the regiment only had about 20 tanks, 41 RTR was ordered to make up the numbers. The Crusader squadron had only gone a few hundred yards when they came upon some infantry digging in, and stopped. But Dumbreck had been told that the infantry he was supporting had definitely reached their objective, so one of the Sherman squadrons pushed on towards the ridge SE of the feature known as 'Snipe', supported by the other, which engaged German tanks coming from Snipe. It emerged that the infantry had not achieved their objective, and 45 RTR withdrew under shellfire. During this unsatisfactory action, the regiment lost 10 tanks and suffered 11 men killed or died of wounds, 10 missing believed dead, and 34 wounded, mainly from mines and shellfire. At the end of the day, 45 RTR handed its remaining tanks over to other regiments and was withdrawn into reserve.

After the battle, 45th (Leeds Rifles) RTR was sent a message of congratulations from the Lord Mayor of Leeds, but the regiment had fought its only battle. Over succeeding months 24 Armoured Bde's officers and men were progressively posted away to other units. However, the planned dispersal of 45 RTR was cancelled, and it took in the remaining details of 41 and 47 RTR and became a holding unit. In this role it received large drafts of replacements from the United Kingdom before they were posted to other regiments. Nevertheless, on 8 March 1943, 45 RTR was finally placed in suspended animation and replaced by a Royal Armoured Corps holding unit.

=== 51st RTR ===
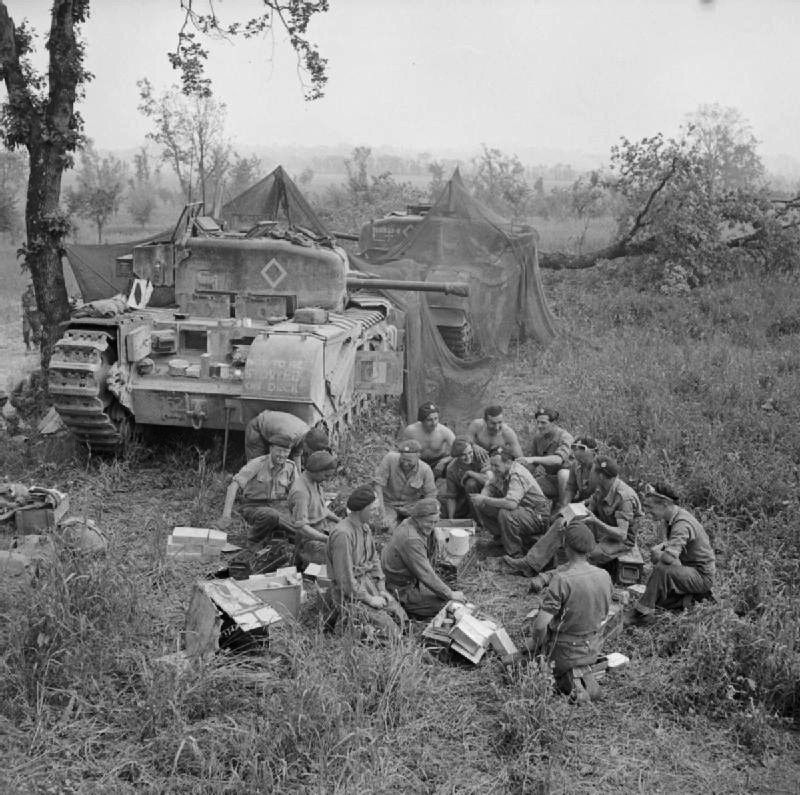
51 RTR Churchill tank crews in Italy, 17 May 1944

At the end of May 1940, with the British Expeditionary Force being evacuated from Dunkirk and the imminent threat of German invasion of England, 25th Army Tank Brigade was redesignated 2nd Motor Machine Gun Brigade and its regiments reorganised accordingly. Each of 51 RTR's three MMG squadrons consisted of three troops, each with six Humber Snipe or Hillman Utility ('Tilly') two-seat cars, two carrying Vickers medium machine guns, two Bren light machine guns and two Boys anti-tank rifles. In July 1940, volunteers from the units of 25th Army Tank Brigade formed No 5 Troop of No. 5 Commando at Bridlington. In August, 51 RTR and the rest of the brigade moved to Northumberland to guard the coastline with machine gun posts along the cliffs and sand dunes.

The 25th Army Tank Brigade was reconstituted at the end of 1940, and its regiments began to receive a trickle of tanks on which to train. By the end of 1942, 51 RTR was fully trained and fully equipped with Churchill tanks. In January 1943, the regiment embarked with 25th Tank Brigade for North Africa, where it came under the command of British First Army in the Tunisia Campaign.

On 7–8 April, 51 RTR supported IX Corps at Fondouk Pass. The 128th Brigade of 46th Infantry Division crossed the Wadi Marguellil during the night and at 5.30 am on 8 April began its main attack, supported by 'C' Sqn 51 RTR, and by noon was on its objective. The regiment ended the campaign in Army Reserve.

25 Tank Brigade came under the command of Brigadier Noel Tetley of the Leeds Rifles at the end of the Tunisia campaign. The brigade, including 51 RTR, remained training in Algeria for almost a year, before they were required for the Italian campaign. 51 RTR embarked on 16 April 1944 and landed at Naples, where it was equipped with Churchill tanks, with a few Shermans and Stuarts.

The brigade distinguished itself in support of the 1st Canadian Infantry Division in the assault on the Adolf Hitler Line in May 1944. At the request of the Canadians, its regiments adopted the Maple leaf as an additional badge, later worn by 51 RTR's successors, the Leeds Detachment (Leeds Rifles), Imphal (PWO) Company, East and West Riding Regiment. Brigadier Tetley, formerly of the Leeds Rifles himself, was the only Territorial Army RTR officer to command a brigade on active service. 51 RTR went on to fight in the Gothic Line battles of August–September 1944.

To deal with the successive enemy lines of defences anticipated in the later stages of the campaign, it was decided late in 1944 to convert 25th Tank Brigade into 25th Assault Engineer Brigade, equipped with specialised armour ('funnies'. Organised on 5 January 1945, this was primarily a Royal Engineers formation, but 51 RTR remained in the brigade and was also converted to specialised armour. 'B' Squadron received 15 Crab Mark II flail tanks, while 'A' and 'C' sqns had a total of 32 Churchill Crocodile flamethrowing tanks. Each squadron in the brigade was self-administering, so that they could be detached where required.

The 25th Armoured Assault Brigade first went into action at the crossing of the Senio on 9 April 1945. 51 RTR was attached to the 2nd New Zealand and 8th Indian Divisions. The flamethrowing tanks crept forward during the preliminary bombardment and positioned themselves close to the floodbank as possible. One minute before the infantry assault started the positions were flamed. Most of the Crocodiles had to be 60 feet behind the bank to be able to direct their flame over the bank.

=== 66th HAA Regiment ===
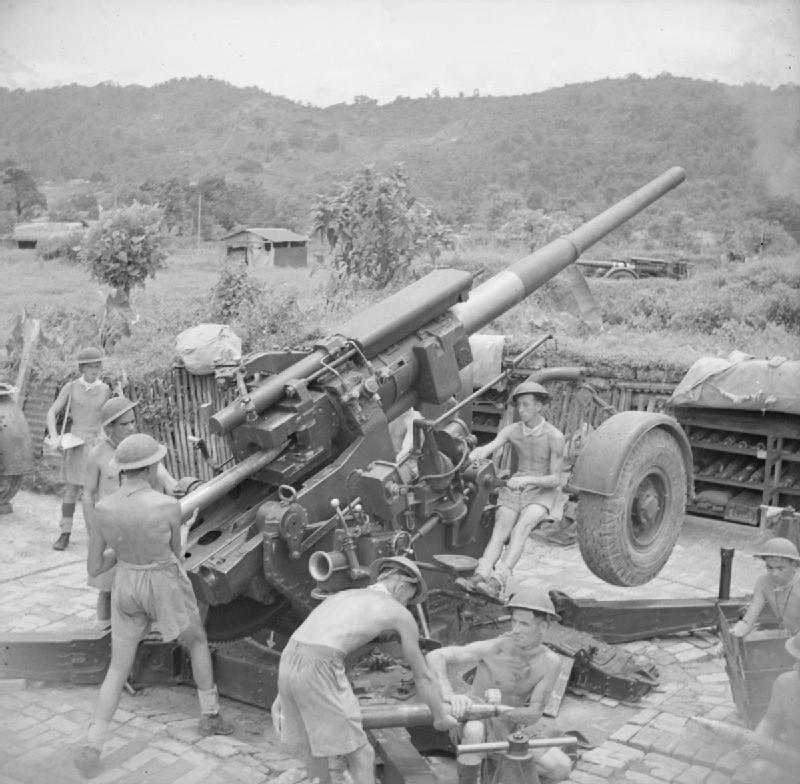
A 4.5-inch gun of 66th HAA Regiment at one of the main supply airstrips on the Ledo road, 24 July 1944.

66th (Leeds Rifles) AA Regiment served in 31st AA Brigade during the Phoney war. On 1 June 1940, along with other AA units equipped with the older 3-inch and newer 3.7-inch AA guns, the 66th was designated a Heavy AA Regiment. In September 1940 it was assigned to OSDEF (Orkneys and Shetland Defence Force), primarily guarding the great naval base at Scapa Flow in Orkney, but with 296 Bty detached to Shetland. During the winter, 197 HAA Bty embarked for West Africa Command, where it joined 1st HAA Regiment, West African Artillery (WAA), formed on 1 May 1941, with one section joining 3 HAA Bty, 3rd HAA Rgt, WAA.

In June 1941, 66th (Leeds Rifles) HAA Rgt returned to England, joining 62nd AA Bde in 10th Anti-Aircraft Division covering Yorkshire. It had previously sent a cadre to 210th HAA Training Regiment at Oswestry to provide the basis for a new 421 HAA Bty; this was formed on 10 April and joined the regiment on 7 July. The regiment later sent a cadre to 205th HAA Training Regiment at Aborfield for a new 483 (Mixed) HAA Bty; this was formed on 25 September 1941 and later joined 139th (Mixed) HAA Rgt. ('Mixed' units were those into which women of the Auxiliary Territorial Service (ATS) were integrated.) The regiment sent a further cadre to 205th HAA Training Regiment for 503 (Mixed) HAA Bty; this was formed on 17 December 1941 and later joined 144th (Mixed) HAA Rgt.

In January 1942, 66th (Leeds Rifles) HAA Rgt moved to 34th (South Midland) AA Bde in 11th Anti-Aircraft Division, covering Birmingham and Coventry, and on 10 February 296 HAA Bty returned from 96th HAA Rgt. However, that month the regiment left AA Command entirely. In March 1942, it was assigned to the War Office Reserve and prepared to go overseas, leaving 421 HAA Bty behind to join 108th HAA Rgt.

In May 1942, the regiment (with 184, 185 and 296 HAA Btys) was sent to India, where it served in 1st and 2nd Indian AA Brigades before moving to Burma as part of 9th AA Brigade. During 1943, the regiment served in the Manipur Road sector, and in January 1944 it detached 296 Battery to the Ledo area of Assam, the start of the famous Ledo Road. During 1944 it remained in the same areas, as part of 3rd Indian AA Brigade. On 15 March 1945 it was placed in suspended animation and in May the men were awaiting return to the UK.

== Postwar ==
When the Territorial Army was reformed after the war, it included a combined 45th/51st (Leeds Rifles) RTR and the 466th (Leeds Rifles) (Mixed) Heavy Anti-Aircraft Regiment, RA ('Mixed' indicating that members of the Women's Royal Army Corps were integrated into the unit). On 1 January 1954, the latter was reorganised as 466th (Leeds Rifles) Light Anti-Aircraft Regiment, RA. On the abolition of AA Command on 10 March 1955, the regiment absorbed 491 (Mixed) HAA Rgt and 496th (Mixed) HAA Rgt (the old 96th HAA Regt, to which the Leeds Rifles had provided cadres) at Oulton, which became 'R' Battery.

On 30 October 1956, the 45th/51st (Leeds Rifles) RTR returned to the infantry role under its old title of 7th (Leeds Rifles) Bn West Yorkshire Regiment. In 1961, it re-absorbed the 466th (Leeds Rifles) LAA Regt to form The Leeds Rifles, The Prince of Wales's Own Regiment of Yorkshire.

On the reorganisation of the TA into the Territorial Army Volunteer Reserve (TAVR) in 1967, the Leeds Rifles formed part of A Company (The Prince of Wales's Own Regiment of Yorkshire) Yorkshire Volunteers in TAVR II at York, and the Leeds Rifles Territorials in TAVR III, with HQ and two companies at Leeds and another company at Castleford. These subsequently became E (later A) (Leeds Rifles) Company, 1st Bn Yorkshire Volunteers, and C (Leeds Rifles) Company, 2nd Bn Yorkshire Volunteers. Successive amalgamations led by 1999 to the Leeds Rifles being reduced to a Leeds-based Platoon of Imphal Company, the East and West Riding Regiment. In 2006, Imphal Company became HQ Company of the 4th Bn The Yorkshire Regiment.

== Honorary Colonels of the Regiment ==
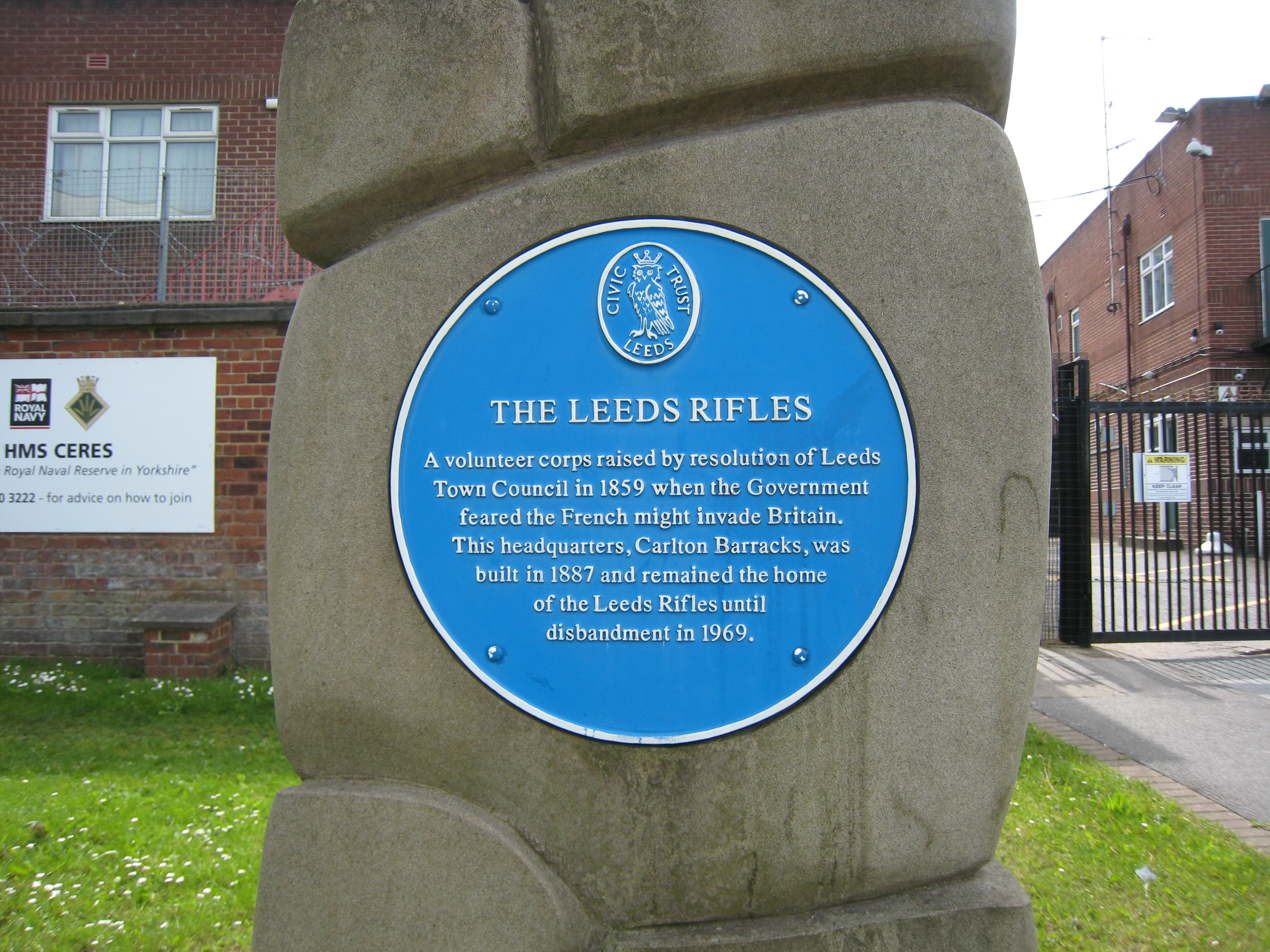
Leeds Rifles blue plaque

Honorary Colonels were:

- 1882–1886: vacant
- 1886–1902: Hon. Col. Charles Ryder, VD
- 1902–1911: Hon. Col. Sir James Kitson, Bt.
- 1911–1913: vacant
- 1913–1928: Hon. Brig-Gen. Horatio Reginald Mends, CB
- 1928–1932: Col. Albert Edward Kirk, OBE, VD, TD
- 1932–1939: Col. Hugh Delabere Bousfield, CMG, DSO, TD
- 1939–1948: Col. Charles Harold Tetley, DSO, TD
- 1948–1963: Brig. James Noel Tetley, DSO, TD, DL, ADC
- 1963–1966: Col. (Hon. Brig.) Kenneth Hargreaves, CBE, TD, DL
- 1966_1967: Col. John Houston Taylor, TD

== Insignia ==
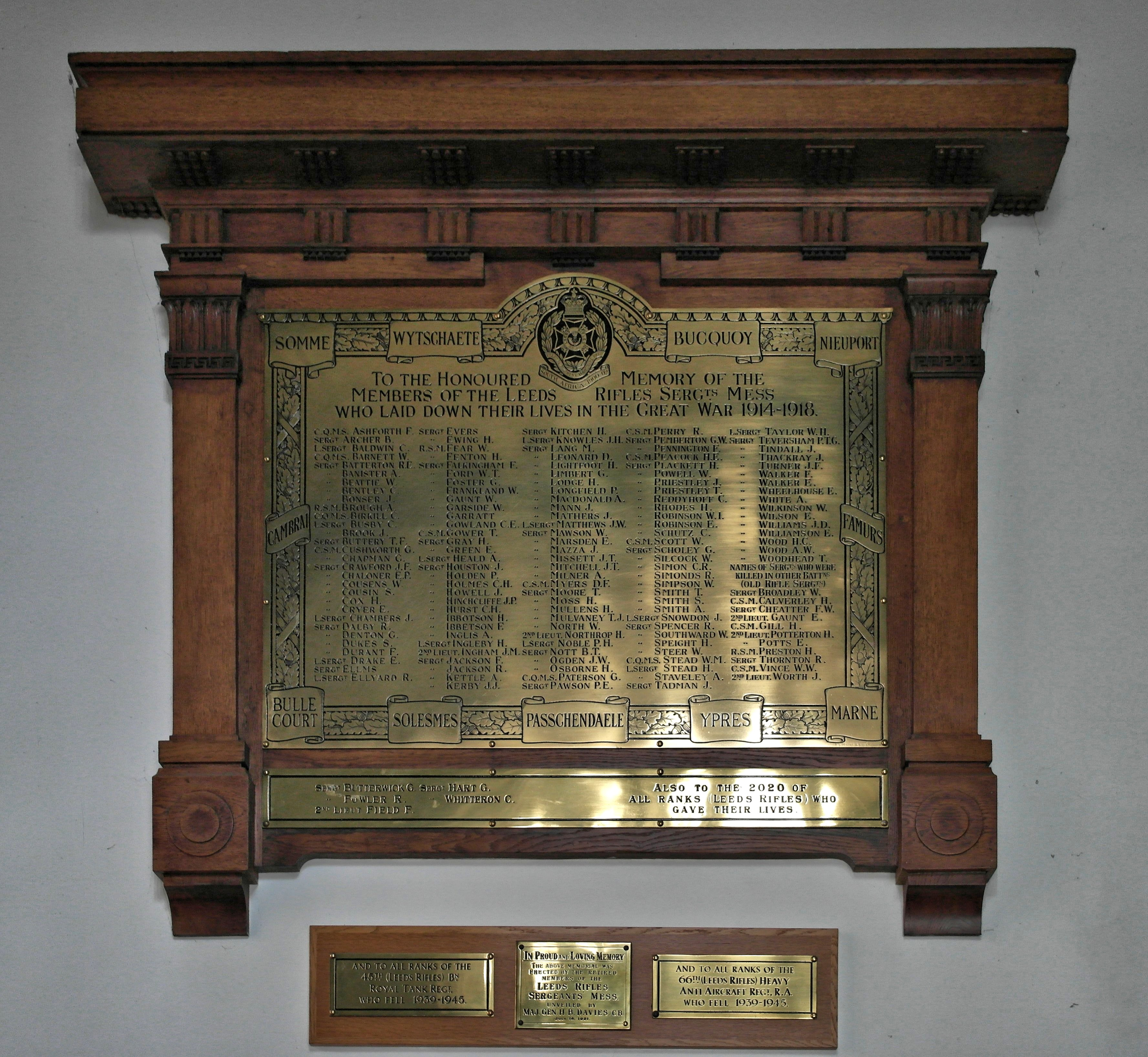
Memorial to fallen of the Leeds Rifles Sergeants' Mess in St Peter Church, Leeds

Upon conversion to Royal Artillery (RA), the 66th (Leeds Rifles) HAA Regiment continued to wear the 7th/8th Bn cap badge while wearing RA collar badges. It also continued the tradition of wearing the Croix de Guerre ribbon on both sleeves. The custom was continued by 466th HAA Regiment.

After the 45th/51st (Leeds Rifles) RTR reverted to the infantry role, it continued to carry on its colours and appointments the honorary distinction of the badge of the Royal Tank Regiment with dates '1942–45' and two scrolls inscribed 'North Africa' and 'Italy'.

== Memorials ==
In 1921, a memorial plaque was erected in Leeds Parish Church by the Sergeants' Mess to their fallen members. After the Second World War, two further plaques were added to 45 RTR and 66 HAA respectively, commemorating all ranks who fell.

The Leeds Rifles War Memorial, a large Portland stone cross, stands on the edge of the Leeds Parish churchyard, facing out onto Kirkgate. The memorial was designed by Sir Edwin Lutyens and unveiled on Remembrance Sunday 1921 by Captain George Sanders, VC.
