= James Noel Tetley =

Brigadier James Tetley DSO TD DL
- Born: 30 December 1898; Headingley, West Yorkshire, England
- Died: 25 December 1971 (aged 72); West Yorkshire, England
- Military career
- Allegiance: United Kingdom
- Branch: British Army
- Service years: 1918–1945
- Rank: Brigadier
- Service number: 21972
- Unit: West Yorkshire Regiment
- Commands: 7th (Leeds Rifles) Battalion, West Yorkshire Regiment; 45th Royal Tank Regiment; 34th Army Tank Brigade; 25th Army Tank Brigade
- Conflicts: Second World War
- Awards: Distinguished Service Order; Territorial Decoration
- Other work: Pro-Chancellor, University of Leeds; President, Leeds Permanent Building Society

Brigadier James Noel Tetley DSO TD DL (30 December 1898 – 25 December 1971) was a member of a prominent Yorkshire brewing family and a senior British Army officer who saw active service in the Italian Campaign during the Second World War.

== Early life ==
James Noel Tetley was born on 30 December 1898 in Headingley, Leeds, to Frank Tetley and his wife Harriett Constance. The Tetley family founded and directed Joshua Tetley & Son of Leeds, one of the largest brewers in the country.

Towards the end of World War I, aged 19, Noel Tetley was commissioned into the Prince of Wales's Own West Yorkshire Regiment (Second lieutenant 19 May 1918). However, the war ended before he could proceed overseas on active service. On the reformation of the part-time Territorial Force after the Armistice, Noel Tetley joined the 7th (Leeds Rifles) Battalion, West Yorkshire Regiment. This was the 'family regiment': the original volunteers for the Leeds Rifles in 1859 had come from Tetley employees, and the Commanding officer in 1919 was Noel's cousin Lieutenant Colonel (later Brigadier) Charles Harold Tetley, DSO.

Noel Tetley steadily rose in the Leeds Rifles between the World Wars, becoming Commanding Officer of 7th Battalion with the rank of Lieutenant Colonel on 16 February 1938. The following November, the 7th (Leeds Rifles) Battalion was converted from infantry to the armoured role, becoming 45th (Leeds Rifles) Bn, Royal Tank Regiment. Soon afterwards the company based in Morley, West Yorkshire, split off to form 51st (Leeds Rifles) Battalion, Royal Tank Regiment.

== Second World War ==
Until the outbreak of the Second World War in September 1939, Tetley was engaged in training his Territorial soldiers, and once war was declared his battalion took in new drafts of militiamen (wartime conscripts) for training, even though there were no real tanks to train on until February 1940. In December 1941 a new 34th Army Tank Brigade was created and Tetley was promoted to Acting Brigadier to take command of it.

On 3 July 1943 Tetley left 34 Tank Brigade to assume command of 25th Army Tank Brigade in Tunisia, whose commander had been wounded during the recent campaign in Tunisia. Among its tank regiments were the North Irish Horse, which had served under him in 34 Tank Brigade, and 51st Royal Tank Regiment (RTR) formed from his battalion of the Leeds Rifles (the third regiment was the 142nd (Suffolk) Regiment, Royal Armoured Corps). These veterans of the Tunisian campaign remained in North Africa for many months, training and conducting exercises, until they embarked for Italy and landed at Naples in April 1944. Tetley commanded the brigade through all its operations in the Italian campaign that year. He was the only TA officer of the RTR to command a brigade on active service during the Second World War.

The brigade distinguished itself in support of the 1st Canadian Infantry Division in the assault on the Hitler Line in May 1944. The North Irish Horse lost 60% of its available tanks and suffered more casualties than on any other day in its history, and later celebrated 23 May as its Regimental Day. At the request of the Canadian commander, the brigade adopted the maple leaf as an additional badge. This badge is still worn by the successors of 51 RTR, the Leeds Detachment (Leeds Rifles), Imphal (PWO) Company, The East and West Riding Regiment.

Later, it was the 142nd RAC of Tetley's brigade that effected the junction between the British Eighth Army and US Fifth Army at Valmontone on 3 June. Tetley led the 25th Tank Brigade during the advance to Florence in July and August, and at the forcing of the Gothic Line and Rimini Line in August and September. He was awarded the Distinguished Service Order in October 1944.

In late November the regiments of the 25th Tank Brigade were withdrawn from the front line to rest and refit with specialist armoured vehicles. 'No reason was seen why the rest should be extended to the enemy', and Tetley sent the tanks of his brigade HQ troop up to the line to bombard the enemy, firing their guns for the first time at the end of a long campaign. As 25 Tank Brigade prepared to convert to an Armoured Assault Brigade of the Royal Engineers (RE), Tetley relinquished command of the brigade to an RE officer in December 1944 and returned to the United Kingdom. He was granted the rank of Honorary Colonel on 1 March 1945, and later was awarded the Territorial Decoration with four clasps.

== Postwar ==
In 1948, with the rank of Honorary Brigadier, Noel Tetley was appointed as an Aide-de-Camp to King George VI and Queen Elizabeth II (1948–1958). In the same year he succeeded his cousin, Brigadier C.H. Tetley, DSO, TD, as Honorary Colonel of the Leeds Rifles and held the position until 1963. During this period the 45th/51st (Leeds Rifles) RTR once again became the 7th Battalion of the PWO West Yorkshires.

Tetley served as President of the Court of Leeds University and was the University's Pro-Chancellor 1956–1965, deputising for the Princess Royal who was the ceremonial Chancellor. (Again, his cousin Charles Harold had preceded him in the office (1926–1946).) He was awarded an honorary doctorate by the University in 1951. His portrait in academic robes was painted by Henry Marvell Carr.

Tetley was also President of the Leeds Permanent Building Society, and a Deputy Lieutenant for West Yorkshire.

Brigadier Noel Tetley died on 25 December 1971, leaving a widow, Joyce Carine Tetley, and two children, Richard and Carine.

== Notes ==
Honorary titles
Preceded by Brigadier Charles Herbert Tetley	Honorary Colonel of the Leeds Rifles; 1948–1963	Succeeded by Brigadier Kenneth Hargreaves
