= 35th Armoured Brigade =

35th Army Tank Brigade 35th Tank Brigade 35th Armoured Brigade
- Formation sign of the 35th Army Tank Brigade and subsequent.
- Active: 1941–1945
- Disbanded: 31 August 1945
- Country: United Kingdom
- Branch: British Army
- Type: Armoured brigade
- Role: Home Defence; Training

The 35th Armoured Brigade was an armoured brigade formation of the British Army, formed during the Second World War. The brigade was never deployed in combat, remaining in the UK to act as a home defence and training unit, and provided replacements for other formations.

== Unit history ==
The unit was formed in the UK on 1 December 1941 when the 225th Independent Infantry Brigade was converted to armour and renamed the 35th Army Tank Brigade as part of Northern Command. On 1 January 1942, its units were renamed, with the 10th Battalion, King's Own Royal Regiment (Lancaster) becoming the 151st Regiment Royal Armoured Corps, the 11th Battalion, King's Regiment (Liverpool) becoming the 152nd Regiment Royal Armoured Corps, and the 15th Battalion, Durham Light Infantry becoming the 155th Regiment Royal Armoured Corps. They were equipped with the Canal Defence Light, a Matilda II or Churchill (and later M3 Grant) tank, fitted with a turret containing a 13 million candlepower (12.8 million candela) searchlight, designed to dazzle, disorient, and temporarily blind the enemy.

The 151st Regiment RAC was detached on 4 August 1942, to join the 25th Army Tank Brigade, and was replaced by the 49th Royal Tank Regiment on 16 August, the brigade having been renamed 35th Tank Brigade the previous day, and transferred to the command of GHQ Home Forces on 8 August. On 10 April 1943, the brigade was transferred to the 79th Armoured Division, returning to the command of GHQ Home Forces on 27 April 1944. On 13 July 1944, the 43rd Royal Tank Regiment was added to the brigade, to replace the 49th RTR, which had been detached on 30 April to join the 1st Tank Brigade of the 79th Armoured. The 8th Battalion, King's Royal Rifle Corps joined on 17 September 1944, and the Royal Wiltshire Yeomanry and Warwickshire Yeomanry were added to the brigade on 27 March 1945. On 16 June 1945, the 1st Battalion, Royal Gloucestershire Hussars and the Yorkshire Hussars were also added. On 14 July, it was renamed the 35th Armoured Brigade; it was disbanded on 31 August 1945.

== Order of battle ==
Sources
| Unit | From | To |
|---|---|---|
| 151st Regiment Royal Armoured Corps | 1 January 1942 | 4 August 1942 |
| 152nd Regiment Royal Armoured Corps | 1 January 1942 | 31 August 1945 |
| 155th Regiment Royal Armoured Corps | 1 January 1942 | 31 August 1945 |
| 49th Royal Tank Regiment | 16 August 1942 | 30 April 1944 |
| 43rd Royal Tank Regiment | 13 July 1944 | 30 May 1945 |
| 8th Battalion, King's Royal Rifle Corps | 17 September 1944 | 13 July 1945 |
| Royal Wiltshire Yeomanry | 27 March 1945 | 31 August 1945 |
| Warwickshire Yeomanry | 27 March 1945 | 31 August 1945 |
| 1st Battalion, Royal Gloucestershire Hussars | 16 June 1945 | 31 August 1945 |
| Yorkshire Hussars | 16 June 1945 | 31 August 1945 |

== Commanding officers ==
Brigadier H. T. de B. Lipscomb was appointed commanding officer of the 35th Brigade on 4 December 1941, remaining in post for the entirety of the unit's existence.

== See also ==
- British Armoured formations of World War II
- List of British brigades of the Second World War
