= 91st Heavy Anti-Aircraft Regiment, Royal Artillery =

British military unit

91st Heavy Anti-Aircraft Regiment, RA 491 Heavy Anti-Aircraft Regiment, RA
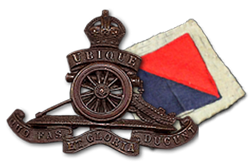
- Royal Artillery cap badge and AA patch
- Active: 7 March 1939–10 March 1955
- Country: United Kingdom
- Branch: Territorial Army
- Role: Air Defence
- Size: Regiment
- Garrison/HQ: Goole; Harrogate
- Engagements: Battle of Britain; Sheffield Blitz; Hull Blitz; Middle East

91st Heavy Anti-Aircraft Regiment, Royal Artillery (91st HAA Rgt) was a part-time unit of Britain's Territorial Army (TA) formed in the West Riding of Yorkshire just before the outbreak of World War II. Its service during the war included Home Defence during the Battle of Britain and The Blitz, and a length period in Middle East Forces. Postwar, it continued to serve in the TA in the air defence role until 1955.

== Origin ==
In the period of international tension of the late 1930s, the TA's Anti-Aircraft (AA) strength grew rapidly, much of this expansion being achieved by splitting existing units. 91st Anti-Aircraft Regiment was formed in the Royal Artillery on 7 March 1939 with a new regimental headquarters (RHQ) and one battery at Goole (then in the West Riding), but also drawing on two existing batteries:

- RHQ at Goole
  - Commanding Officer (CO): Lieutenant-Colonel K.G. Chilman, formerly of 221 AA Bty
- 221 (1st West Riding) AA Bty at Lumley Barracks, York – transferred on 7 March 1939 from 62nd (Northumbrian) AA Rgt, but originally converted from a battery of 54th (West Riding and Durham) Medium Brigade
- 270 (Wentworth) AA Bty at Wentworth, South Yorkshire – transferred from 68th (North Midland) AA Rgt under which it had been forming at Rotherham in January 1939
- 286 AA Bty at Goole – newly formed

== World War II ==
=== Mobilisation ===
In June 1939, as the international situation worsened, a partial mobilisation of the TA was begun in a process known as 'couverture', whereby each AA unit did a month's tour of duty in rotation to man selected gun positions. On 22 August, the whole of Anti-Aircraft Command was mobilised ahead of the declaration of war. The regiment deployed in the Humber Gun Zone as part of 39 AA Bde in 2 AA Division (although a new 7 AA Division was being formed to cover the area north of the Humber, its exact responsibilities had still to be worked out). RHQ was established at Paull Vicarage, and it drew its ammunition from the nearby Paull magazine. 221 (WR) Battery was at two sites on the south bank of the Humber, each with 4 x 3.7-inch guns, 270 Bty was at Paull, and 286 Bty at King George Dock, Hull, and at Brough. The regiment also temporarily deployed eight sections armed with Lewis guns to the radar station at Staxton-on-Wold in the light AA (LAA) role. (39 AA Brigade already referred to its AA gun regiments as HAA to distinguish them from the specialist LAA units that were being formed; this became official across the Royal Artillery on 1 June 1940.)

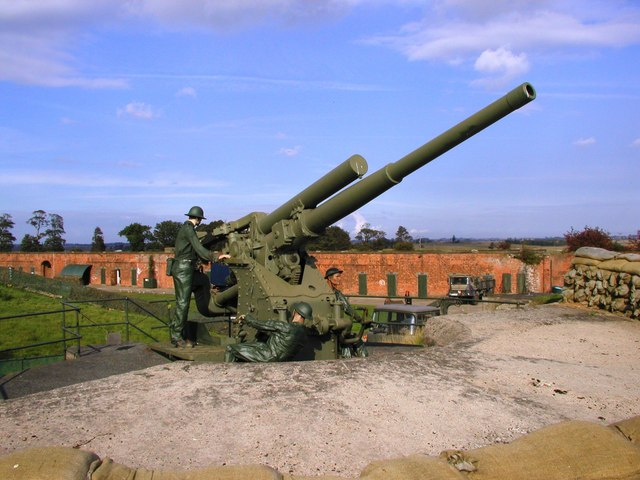
Static 3.7-inch gun preserved at Fort Paull.

On the outbreak of war, the Humber Gun Zone had 30 HAA guns, of which 28 were operational. These included 3-inch, 3.7-inch and 4.5-inch guns, but there was considerable shifting of guns between sites during the winter of 1939–40. On 23 September 1939, 91st HAA Rgt and the Humber Gun Zone were transferred to the command of 31 (North Midland) AA Bde in 7 AA Division but returned to 39 AA Bde and 2 AA Division in May 1940. In May, a composite battery drawn from 221 and 270 Btys was temporarily lent to 44 AA Bde to man a mobile 8-gun battery at Crewe.

Additional guns began to arrive in the Humber zone, for example 286 HAA Bty took over eight newly arrived 4.5-inch guns on three sites north of the Humber in May and 221 HAA Bty established a new 4 x 3.7-inch gunsite at Stallingborough in June. As of 11 July, the Humber Gun Zone had 38 operational HAA guns. In July, 286 HAA Bty moved to 2 AA Division HQ at Kimberley, Nottinghamshire, to become a divisional reserve battery and was replaced by 270 Bty back from Crewe. 286 Battery was soon deployed from Kimberley to man two semi-mobile 3-inch guns to defend RAF Horsham St Faith, with a section near Norwich. RHQ moved about this time to The Elms, Ulceby, North Lincolnshire.

=== Battle of Britain and Blitz ===
After the Fall of France, German day and night air raids and mine laying began along the East Coast of England, intensifying through June 1940. Several times the Humber HAA guns (62nd and 91st HAA Rgts) were in action against aircraft attacking the Salt End and North Killingholme oil installations, and the regiment claimed its first two 'kills' on the night of 26/27 June. It claimed another three by the middle of August.

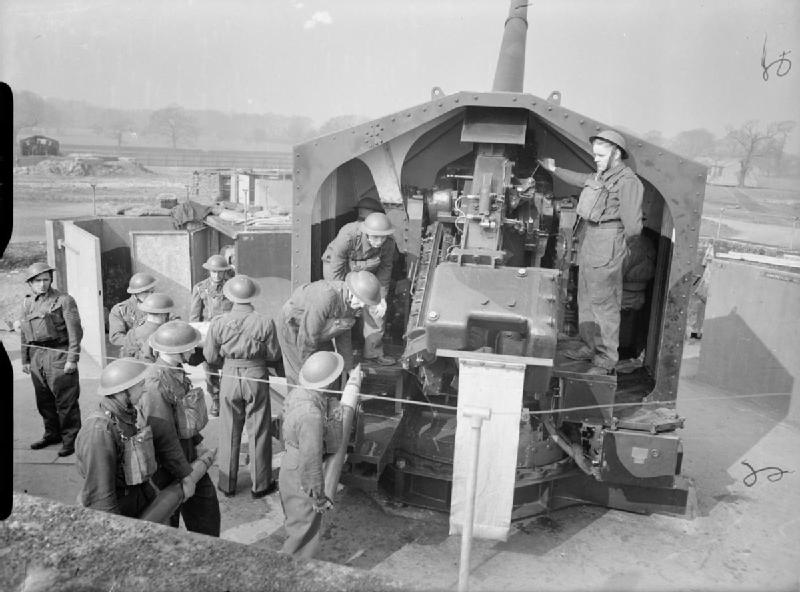
4.5-inch HAA gun at Leeds 20 March 1941.

Luftwaffe night raids over the Humber increased during August while the Battle of Britain was under way, but were still small in scale. 221 HAA Battery was nominated as a reserve battery with mobile guns, and during September it was sent to reinforce 26 (London) AA Bde defending London as The Blitz got under way (where one gunner was killed by a bomb blast). In mid-October, 270 Bty and half of 286 HAA Bty (from Horsham St Faith) were sent by 39 AA Bde to reinforce the Sheffield Gun Zone under the command of 67th (York and Lancaster) HAA Rgt, while the other half of 286 Bty went to London to reinforce 221 Bty. 221 Battery moved from London to Norwich in October, and then to Nottingham and Derby in December. The CO, Lt-Col Chilman, went to command a training regiment in October and was replaced by Lt-Col K.W. MacKichan.

==== Sheffield Blitz ====
Throughout the night of 12/13 December, the Humber guns engaged large numbers of bombers passing over on their way to attack Sheffield and Rotherham (the Sheffield Blitz). On 10 January 1941, 270 and 286 HAA Btys returned to man gun positions in the Humber Gun Zone, with 286 HAA Bty establishing its HQ at Barrow upon Humber. 221 HAA Battery also returned, to Scawby and Scunthorpe, on 20 February 1941. The regiment was now concentrated on the south bank of the Humber, and its CO was AA Defence Commander (AADC) for Scunthorpe.

A new 10th AA Division was created in November 1940, and 39 AA Bde was transferred to it on 20 January 1941.

==== Hull Blitz ====
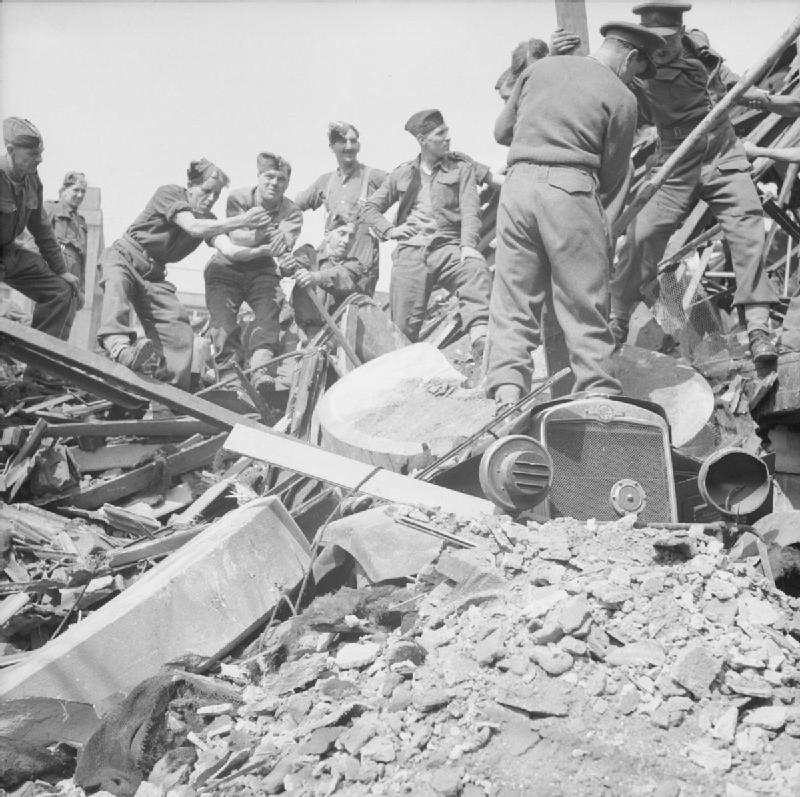
Troops of 9th Battalion, The Hampshire Regiment, helping to clear bomb damage in Hull.

In February 1941, the Luftwaffe began a campaign of intensive minelaying in the Humber, and 'barrage fire' against the circling raiders was pretty much guesswork. However, barrage fire partially disrupted a heavy raid against Hull and Grimsby on the night of 23/24 February. Predicted concentrations, using Gun Laying (GL) Radar, were more effective if there were not too many targets. 395 HAA Battery, formed at 206th HAA Training Regiment at Arborfield on 12 December 1940 by a cadre drawn from 91st HAA Rgt, joined the regiment on 10 March 1941 and took over two 2-gun 4.5-inch sites.

Hull was raided regularly during the better weather of March 1941, with a serious raid on 13/14 March leaving many fires burning and numerous casualties, while Hull Docks was attacked on 31 March/1 April. The most concentrated attacks came on the nights of 7/8 and 8/9 May (the Hull Blitz). On the first night, fires started in the city acted as a beacon for subsequent waves of bombers, and the telephone lines to the Gun Operations Room were cut. The Humber guns fired 1950 rounds that night. On the second night, the bombers starting dive-bombing the still-burning city in groups, making predicted fire difficult, but the guns fired about 3400 rounds. The two-night blitz resulted in over 400 deaths in the city. However, after this the number of raids against the UK tailed away and the Blitz is considered to have ended on 16 May, though periodic raids on Hull still occurred, causing damage and deaths. RHQ moved from Ulceby to The Manor, Healing, Lincolnshire, on 14 May.

=== Mid war ===
10 AA Division formation badge, worn on the upper arm by all ranks of the regiment.

Old 3-inch guns continued to be replaced by static 3.7 and 4.5-inch HAA guns as they became available during the summer of 1941. In October, 16 additional 3.7-inch guns arrived for the Humber Gun Defence Area (GDA) as the zone was now termed, and additional units came to man them, including 80th (Berkshire) HAA Rgt, while 184 HAA Bty of 66th (Leeds Rifles) HAA Rgt from Rotherham was attached to 91st HAA Rgt and took over Scunthorpe. This battery was replaced in mid-December by 421 HAA Bty of the same regiment, until it left at the end of February 1942. 478 HAA Bty, formed at 206th HAA Training Rgt from a cadre provided by 91st HAA Rgt in September, joined on 3 December, taking over two 4-gun sites at Goxhill Haven and Barrow Haven, while 270 (Wentworth) Bty was transferred to 106th HAA Rgt in 2 AA Division to make room for the new battery.

During 1941, the regiment claimed three enemy aircraft shot down (Category 1) and another possible (Cat. 3).

62nd (Northumbrian) HAA Rgt on the north bank of the Humber had become a unit of the field force rostered for overseas service, and in January 1942 120 of its men who were not fit for overseas service and were to remain in AA Command were transferred to 91st HAA Rgt, in exchange for a similar number of men posted to LAA training regiments.

During March, 478 Bty began to convert into a 'Mixed' unit in which women of the Auxiliary Territorial Service (ATS) took over many roles, accounting for around two-thirds of its personnel. Forty-five men were transferred to the regiment's other batteries to replace men of low medical category, and the surplus men were transferred to rocket 'Z' batteries, reserve and LAA training regiments. A reshuffle of the Humber gun positions saw 91st HAA Rgt taking over some sites from 80th (Berkshire) HAA Rgt, which had left the area, and 208 Bty of 58th (Kent) HAA Rgt being temporarily attached to the regiment.

On 21 April 1942, 91st HAA Rgt transferred to 65 AA Bde, which was taking over 39 AA Bde's HAA commitments. But, on 26 April, the regiment received the warning order to leave AA Command and mobilise under War Office control for overseas service. It handed over its gunsites to other units and moved to the West Riding Mobilisation Centre at Headingley, Leeds, with the three all-male batteries (221, 286 and 395). After retraining at 210th HAA Training Rgt at Oswestry, 478 (M) Battery joined 161st HAA Rgt in AA Command.

=== Middle East ===
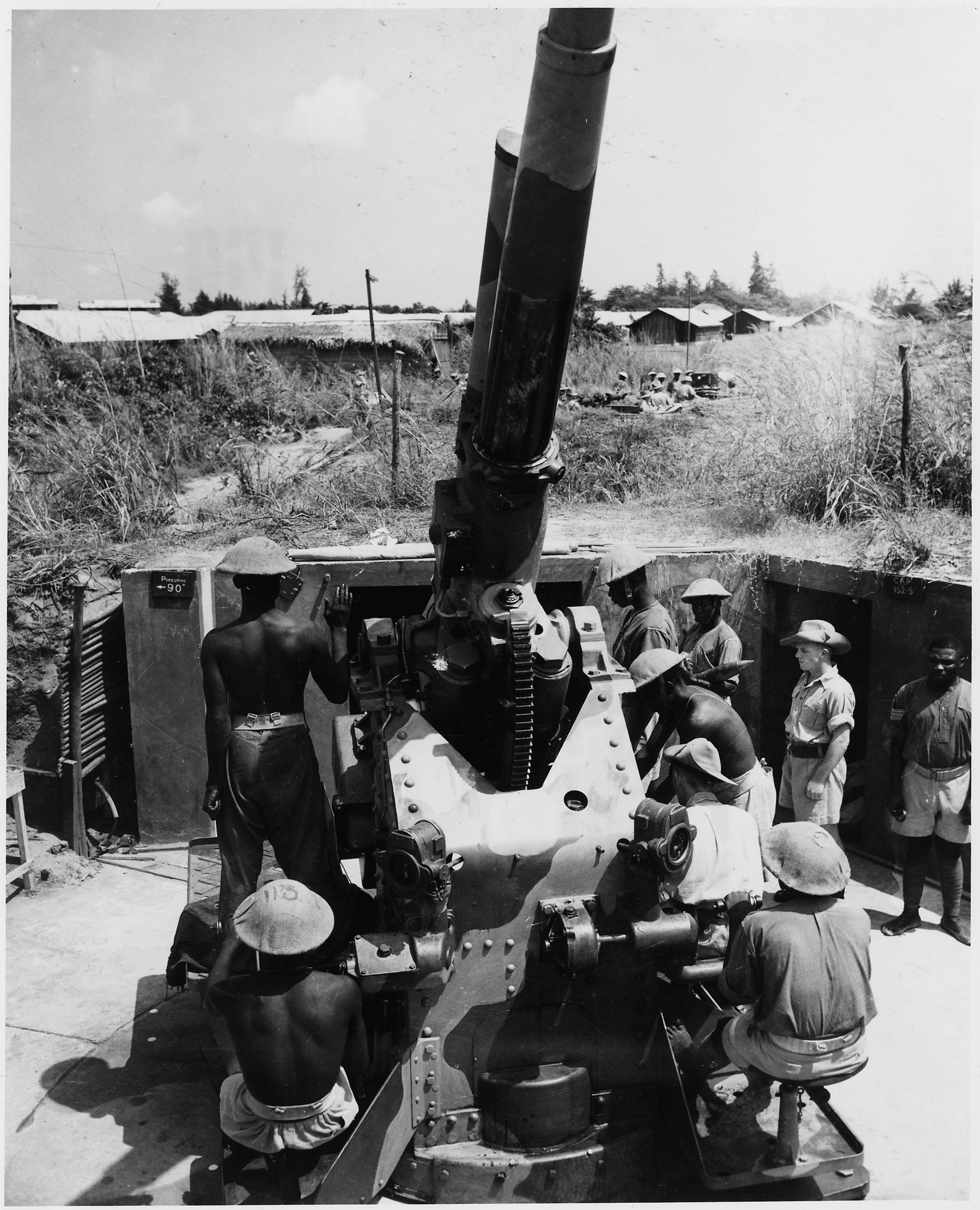
African gunners being trained on a 3.7-inch HAA gun

91st HAA Regiment embarked on HM Transport H13 at Glasgow on 28 May 1942, and after breaking its journey at Durban, disembarked from HMT H4 at Suez on 23 July under the command of Lt-Col R.M. Guest. After a period in Egypt, the regiment was ordered on 10 September to go Beirut in Lebanon, which had been captured from hostile Vichy French forces the previous year. The personnel went by train while the regimental transport followed by road. 221 HAA Battery continued on to Tripoli, where the officer commanding became AADC in defence of the oil terminal. 286 and 395 HAA Batteries took over sites protecting Beirut harbour, some of which had 3.7-inch guns and Mk II Gun-Laying Radar, while the others had old French 75 mm guns. Lieutenant-Colonel Guest became AADC Beirut, and was also responsible for 13 AA Operations Room (AAOR), 122 LAA Bty (13th LAA Rgt) and 501 Czechoslovak LAA Bty. The regiment came under the command of 20 AA Bde as part of Ninth Army.

Occasionally, the regiment fired at lone enemy aircraft engaged in reconnaissance or leaflet dropping, but enemy activity was low. Static 3.7-inch guns began to arrive, allowing the regiment to hand over the obsolete French guns to 434 Coast Bty at Tripoli at the end of the year. The regiment carried out tests on the performance of HAA guns and their transport in the mountains of Lebanon in winter. In April 1943, 395 HAA Bty moved to defend the port at Haifa in Palestine. Both detached batteries returned to Beirut in late June, when 1915 AA Company of the African Pioneer Corps arrived. Eighty-one of the African troops were attached to each battery to be trained as AA gunners and replace British other ranks (ORs) in a process officially described as 'dilution'.

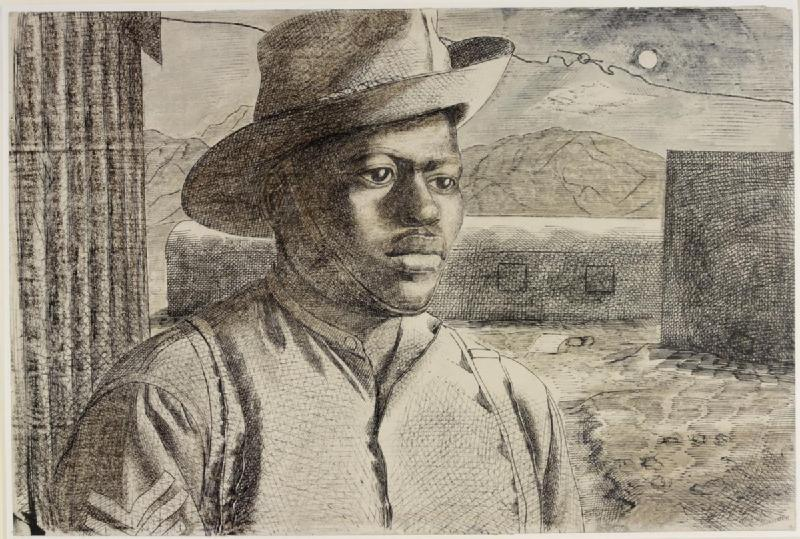
An African Sergeant of the Auxiliary Pioneer Corps in Lebanon.

On 28 June 1943, a reorganisation of AA defences in the Levant saw 91st HAA Rgt come under the control of 81 AA Bde. In mid-July, 286 HAA Bty was detached with its guns back to Egypt, where it went to defend Port Said, and in September the rest of the regiment moved from Beirut to Haifa, where 286 Bty rejoined in October and the regiment returned to 20 AA Bde. It now had 342 LAA Bty and 1 Palestinian Independent LAA Bty under command, with the CO acting as AADC Haifa. Later, 8 AAOR, 304 Searchlight Bty from 27th (London Electrical Engineers) Searchlight Rgt, and 104 LAA Rgt Workshops, Royal Electrical and Mechanical Engineers, were added to RHQ's responsibilities. Apart from a few rounds fired at occasional reconnaissance aircraft, the only barrages fired were to celebrate the Surrender of Italy and as demonstrations to visiting Turkish army officers.

On 6 January 1944, the regiment was relieved by 193rd HAA Rgt and handed over all its guns and equipment to the newcomers, moving to Kfar Yona camp and taking over 193rd HAA Rgt's 24 mobile 3.7-inch guns. Then, in late January, the regiment moved to El Tahag camp in Egypt, where it came under 77 Sub-Area of Middle East Forces (MEF).

The regiment now formed part of 21 AA Bde, in reserve and training for Operation Hercules, a planned landing on Rhodes following the failure of the Dodecanese Campaign, and aimed at getting Turkey into the war. This was called off in February 1944.

At the end of March, the regiment deployed in the AA defence of Alexandria under 18 AA Bde. On 6 April, a mutiny broke out among the Greek Army units in the area, which spread to the Greek Navy, and 91st HAA Rgt was ordered to form three infantry platoons to guard dock gates at Alexandria. A force of 8 officers and 120 British ORs from 286 HAA Bty came under the command of WILFORCE in case it was required to intervene. (Note: One normally reliable source incorrectly places 91st HAA Rgt with Eighth Army in Italy during April 1944, and is followed by some secondary sources, but this is contradicted by the unit's own authoritative war diary. In fact the regiment was in the Middle East throughout this period.)

By now, the air threat to the Middle East bases was low and AA manpower was being diverted to other tasks. On 24 April, Lt-Col Guest was sent to command the troops in Haifa and was not replaced. Then, on 21 May, the regiment was relieved of all its responsibilities at Alexandria and moved to El Tahag camp, where it came back under command of 21 AA Bde. Orders for disbandment arrived on 3 June, and this process was quickly carried out. The regiment and its three batteries were placed in suspended animation on 22 July 1944.

=== Cadres ===
Between 1940 and 1942, 91st HAA Rgt provided five cadres to form the following new batteries. Most cadres comprised a battery commander-designate and other officers, warrant officers and non-commissioned officers (NCOs) and a number of experienced gunners.

- 348 HAA Bty: cadre transferred to 210th HAA Training Rgt at Oswestry, 16 July 1940. Battery later joined 110th HAA Rgt.
- 395 HAA Bty: cadre transferred to 206th HAA Training Rgt at Arborfield 12 December. Battery joined 91st HAA Rgt 10 March 1941.
- 456 (Mixed) HAA Bty: ORs cadre transferred to 205th HAA Training Rgt at Arborfield 10 July 1941. Battery later joined 134th (Mixed) HAA Rgt.
- 478 HAA Bty: cadre transferred to 205th Training Rgt 11 September 1941. Battery joined 91st HAA Rgt 3 December, but reverted to cadre on 9 April 1942 to form 478 (Mixed) HAA Bty. Battery later joined 161st (Mixed) HAA Rgt.
- 524 (Mixed) HAA Bty: cadre No 208 transferred to 206th Training Rgt January 1942. Battery later joined 152nd (Mixed) HAA Rgt.

== Postwar ==
When the TA was reconstituted on 1 January 1947, the regiment was reformed at Derby Road, Harrogate, in the North Riding as 491 (Mixed) Heavy Anti-Aircraft Regiment, ('mixed' now indicating that members of the Women's Royal Army Corps were integrated into the unit). It formed part of 57 AA Bde (the pre-war 31 (North Midland) AA Bde).

AA Command was disbanded in 1955 and there were largescale mergers among its TA regiments: 491 HAA Regiment was absorbed into 466 (Leeds Rifles) LAA Rgt.

== See also ==
134th (Mixed) Heavy Anti-Aircraft Regiment, Royal Artillery

6th Heavy Anti-Aircraft Regiment, Royal Artillery

209th (Mixed) Heavy Anti-Aircraft Training Regiment, Royal Artillery
