= 142nd Regiment Royal Armoured Corps =

142nd (Suffolk) Regiment Royal Armoured Corps
- Active: 1941–1945
- Disbanded: 1945
- Country: United Kingdom
- Branch: British Army
- Type: Armoured Regiment
- Role: Infantry Support
- Part of: Royal Armoured Corps
- Equipment: Matilda II; Churchill

The 142nd (Suffolk) Regiment Royal Armoured Corps (142 RAC) was an armoured regiment of the British Army's Royal Armoured Corps that was raised in World War II and saw active service. The regiment served in the final stages of the North African Campaign at Tunisia and later served during the Italian Campaign from 1943 until early 1945 when it was disbanded.

== Origin ==
The 142nd Regiment RAC was formed on 22 November 1941 by the conversion to the armoured role of the 7th Battalion, Suffolk Regiment, a war-raised infantry battalion that was formed in June 1940 and serving with the 210th Independent Infantry Brigade (Home). In common with other infantry units transferred to the Royal Armoured Corps, all personnel would have continued to wear their Suffolk Regiment cap badge on the black beret of the Royal Armoured Corps. The establishment of a tank regiment being smaller than that of an infantry battalion, there were 161 men surplus to establishment who were transferred to other units, including 53rd and 59th battalions of the Reconnaissance Corps, the remainder of the men going to the 30th Battalion, Queen's Own Royal West Kent Regiment.

== Training ==
142 RAC was assigned to the 25th Army Tank Brigade, alongside the North Irish Horse and 51st RTR. and was initially equipped with Matilda II and Churchill infantry tanks, later standardising on Churchills.

On 4 July 1942, the regiment was ordered to mobilise for overseas service, but nothing came of this.

On 4 August, the Commanding Officer, Lt-Col R.H. Maxwell (Suffolk Regiment) was promoted to Acting Brigadier to command 25th Tank Bde and the Second-in-Command, Major A.S. Birkbeck (Royal Tank Regiment) was promoted to Acting Lt-Col and took over command.

The 25th Tank Brigade had been attached to 43rd (Wessex) Infantry Division and based at Worthing in Sussex, but in September 1942 it changed to 1st Infantry Division in Norfolk, followed in September 1942 by a transfer to 54th (East Anglian) Infantry Division in Suffolk.

On 30 December 1942, the regiment again received orders to prepare for overseas service. Some of the men had to be recalled from harvesting sugar beets.

== Operations ==
The regiment landed at Algiers on 1 February 1943 taking part in Operation Ochsenkopf during early March and in April fought at the Battle of Mejdez-el Bab in the Tunisia. In May it took part in operations in the Tunis area.

On 20 April 1944, 142 RAC landed at Naples to join the Italian campaign, and on 22 May it took part in breaching the Adolf Hitler Line.

It was the Recce Troop of 142 RAC that effected the junction between British Eighth Army and US Fifth Army at Valmontone on 3 June. In July and August 1944, the regiment was in the advance to Florence, and on 28 August it took part in breaching the Gothic Line near Rimini.

142 RAC was disbanded on 22 January 1945 in Italy.

== External sources ==
- Suffolk Regiment Official Website
