= 96th Heavy Anti-Aircraft Regiment, Royal Artillery =

96th HAA Regiment, RA 496th HAA Regiment, RA
- Cap Badge of the Royal Artillery (pre-1953)
- Active: 1 April 1939 – 10 March 1955
- Country: United Kingdom
- Branch: Territorial Army
- Role: Air defence
- Size: Regiment
- Part of: 31 (North Midland) AA Brigade; 62 AA Brigade; Middle East Forces; 69 AA Brigade
- Garrison/HQ: Castleford; Woodlesford
- Engagements: The Blitz

96th Heavy Anti-Aircraft Regiment, Royal Artillery, was an air defence unit of Britain's Territorial Army (TA) formed in West Yorkshire during the period of international tension leading up to the outbreak of World War II. It defended the West Riding during the early part of the war and then served in the Middle East. The regiment continued in the postwar TA until amalgamated in 1955.

== Origin ==
The Territorial Army was rapidly expanded following the Munich Crisis, particularly the Anti-Aircraft (AA) branch of the Royal Artillery (RA). 96th Anti-Aircraft Regiment, RA was among the new units raised in the spring of 1939. It was formed in the West Yorkshire towns of Castleford and Halifax in April and was soon joined by an experienced TA battery from Leeds:

- Regimental Headquarters (RHQ) at Castleford
- 186 AA Battery at Oulton – from 66th (Leeds Rifles) (West Yorkshire Regiment) AA Regiment, joined after May 1939
- 287 AA Battery at Pontefract – originally intended for 92nd Heavy Anti-Aircraft Regiment, Royal Artillery, which never formed
- 294 AA Battery at Castleford
- 295 AA Battery at Halifax
- 296 AA Battery at Halifax – from 66th (Leeds Rifles) AA Regiment

== World War II ==
=== Mobilisation and Phoney War ===
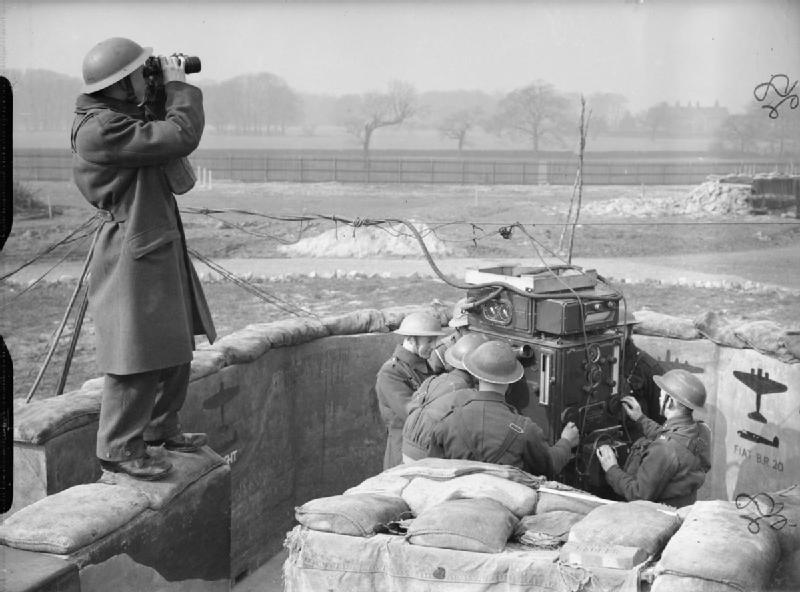
Spotter and predictor operators at a 4.5-inch HAA gun site in Leeds, 20 March 1941.

In June 1939, as the international situation worsened, a partial mobilisation of Anti-Aircraft Command's TA units was begun in a process known as 'couverture', whereby each unit did a month's tour of duty in rotation to man selected AA gun and searchlight positions. On 24 August, ahead of the declaration of war, AA Command was fully mobilised at its war stations. The new regiment mobilised as part of 31 (North Midland) AA Brigade in 7th AA Division, defending Yorkshire including the Gun Defence Areas (GDAs) at Leeds and Sheffield.

Luckily, the months of the Phoney War that followed mobilisation allowed AA Command to address its equipment and manpower shortages. When the War Office released the first intakes of Militiamen to the Command in early 1940, most were found to be in low physical categories and without training. 31 AA Bde reported that out of 1000 recruits sent for duty, '50 had to be discharged immediately because of serious medical defects, another 20 were judged to be mentally deficient and a further 18 were unfit to do any manual labour such as lifting ammunition'. Fitness and training was greatly improved by the time Britain's AA defences were seriously tested during the Battle of Britain and Blitz.

10th AA Division's formation sign.

=== Battle of Britain ===
On 1 June 1940, all RA units manning the older 3-inch or newer 3.7-inch and 4.5-inch guns were designated as Heavy AA (HAA) regiments to distinguish them from the new Light AA (LAA) regiments appearing in the order of battle. 66th (Leeds Rifles) HAA Rgt left 31 AA Bde during 1940 and was sent to the Orkney and Shetland Defences (OSDEF) to defend the Royal Navy's base at Scapa Flow; it took 296 HAA Bty with it as its third battery, leaving 96th HAA with four (187, 286, 294, 295).

The main action in the Battle of Britain was over Southern England, but after its defeat the Luftwaffe turned its attention to night bombing of London and the industrial cities of the UK. On 1 November 1940 AA Command created a new 10th AA Division by taking the two southern brigade areas from 7th AA Division together with a newly-formed 62 AA Bde. 96th HAA Regiment was assigned to 62 AA Bde, which had responsibility for the air defence of Leeds and Sheffield while 31 AA Bde concentrated on East Yorkshire and the Humber.

=== The Blitz ===
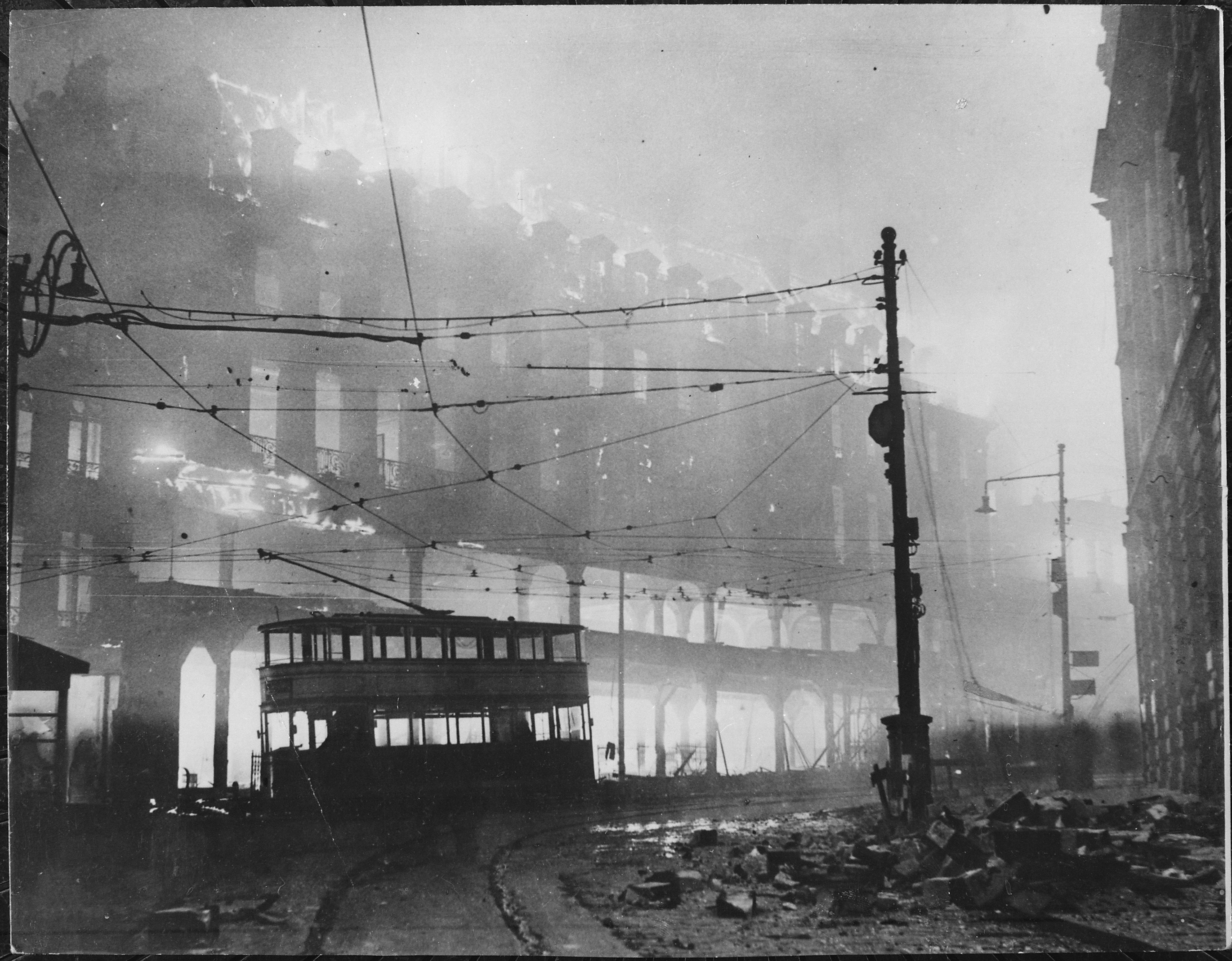
Blitz devastation in Sheffield city centre

At the time 10th AA Division was created, the industrial towns of the UK were under regular attack by night, to which the limited AA defences replied as best they could. West Yorkshire, despite its important industrial facilities, steelworks, aircraft and ordnance factories, was at a considerable distance from the Luftwaffe 's bases and was less often raided than coastal targets and The Midlands. Nevertheless, Sheffield was badly bombed on 12 and 15 December 1940 (the Sheffield Blitz), Leeds on 14 March 1941 (the Leeds Blitz), Hull on 18 March (the Hull Blitz) and on 7 and 8 May, when Sheffield was also hit again. There were still too few AA guns for the tasks set them, and in March 1941 AA Command was obliged to shift some HAA guns from Sheffield to Liverpool, which was under much heavier attack.

The Blitz ended in May 1941. The regiment sent a cadre to 209th HAA Training Regiment at Blandford Camp to provide the basis for a new 447 HAA Bty; this was formed on 12 June 1941 and joined the regiment on 19 September to replace 287 HAA Bty which transferred to the newly-formed 128th HAA Rgt. 296 HAA Battery returned to 66th (Leeds Rifles) HAA Rgt on 10 February 1942, and on 2 April 447 HAA Bty was reduced to a cadre and sent to 211th HAA Training Rgt at Oswestry to form a new 447 (Mixed) HAA Bty, 'Mixed' indicating that women from the Auxiliary Territorial Service were integrated into the unit. The reformed battery then helped to form a new 161st (Mixed) HAA Rgt.

New HAA regiments joined 62 AA Bde at the beginning of 1942, and in May 96th HAA Rgt and its three remaining batteries (186, 294 and 295) left AA Command to mobilise for overseas service.

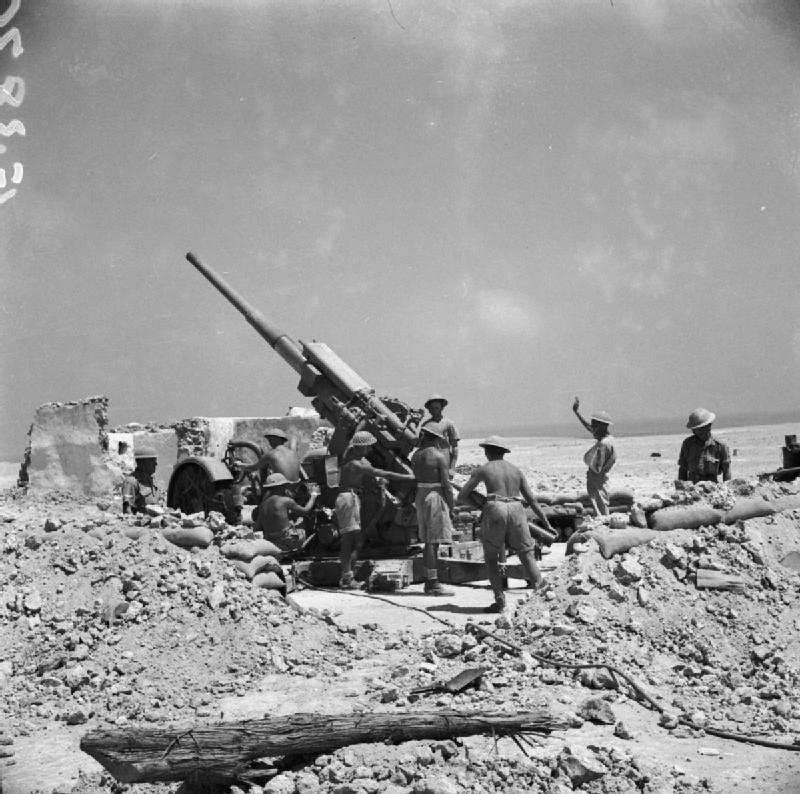
A 3.7-inch HAA gun in Egypt.

=== Middle East ===
96th HAA Regiment was among the flow of reinforcements being sent to Middle East Forces (MEF), arriving by October 1942. After the Second Battle of El Alamein, 96th HAA Rgt formed part of the defences of the Suez Canal, Cairo and the port of Suez under 21 AA Bde. The regiment remained with the Eastern Mediterranean AA Group throughout 1943, but by the beginning of 1944 the air threat had diminished and manpower was urgently required elsewhere. In the summer of 1944, 96th HAA Rgt was one of a number of AA units whose men were drafted to other units (often infantry) and the regiment and its batteries were placed in suspended animation on 20 June.

== Postwar ==
When the TA was reconstituted in 1947 the regiment was reformed at Woodlesford, outside Leeds, as 496 (Mixed) Heavy AA Regiment. ('Mixed' now indicated that members of the Women's Royal Army Corps were integrated into the unit). It formed part of 69 AA Brigade at Leeds.

AA Command was disbanded on 10 March 1955 and there were wholescale amalgamations among its units. 496 HAA Regiment merged into 466 (Leeds Rifles) LAA Rgt in which it formed R Battery. In 1961 the TA was further reduced and 466th HAA Rgt was converted back to infantry and merged with its original parent unit, 7th (Leeds Rifles) Battalion, West Yorkshire Regiment.
