= 10th Anti-Aircraft Division =

- Formation sign of the division, from the crest of the coat of arms of Major-General Langley Browning.
- Active: 11 November 1940 – 30 September 1942
- Country: United Kingdom
- Branch: British Army
- Type: Anti-Aircraft Division
- Role: Air Defence
- Size: 3–4 Brigades
- Part of: 2 AA Corps
- Garrison/HQ: York; Leeds
- Engagements: The Blitz; Baedeker Blitz

The 10th Anti-Aircraft Division (10th AA Division) was an air defence formation of the British Army during the early years of the Second World War. It defended Yorkshire and Northern Lincolnshire during The Blitz and the Baedeker Blitz but only had a short career.

== Mobilisation ==
The 10th Anti-Aircraft Division was one of five new divisions created on 1 November 1940 by Anti-Aircraft Command to control the expanding anti-aircraft (AA) defences of the United Kingdom. The division was formed by taking the two southern brigade areas (31st and 39th) from the existing 7th AA Division in North East England, together with a newly formed brigade (62nd brigade), and giving it responsibility for the air defence of East and West Yorkshire and the Humber Estuary.

The divisional headquarters (HQ) was at York and the first General Officer Commanding (GOC), appointed on 14 November 1940, was Major-General Langley Browning, who had been Commander, Royal Artillery, at 4th Infantry Division. The 10th AA Division formed part of II AA Corps.

== The Blitz ==
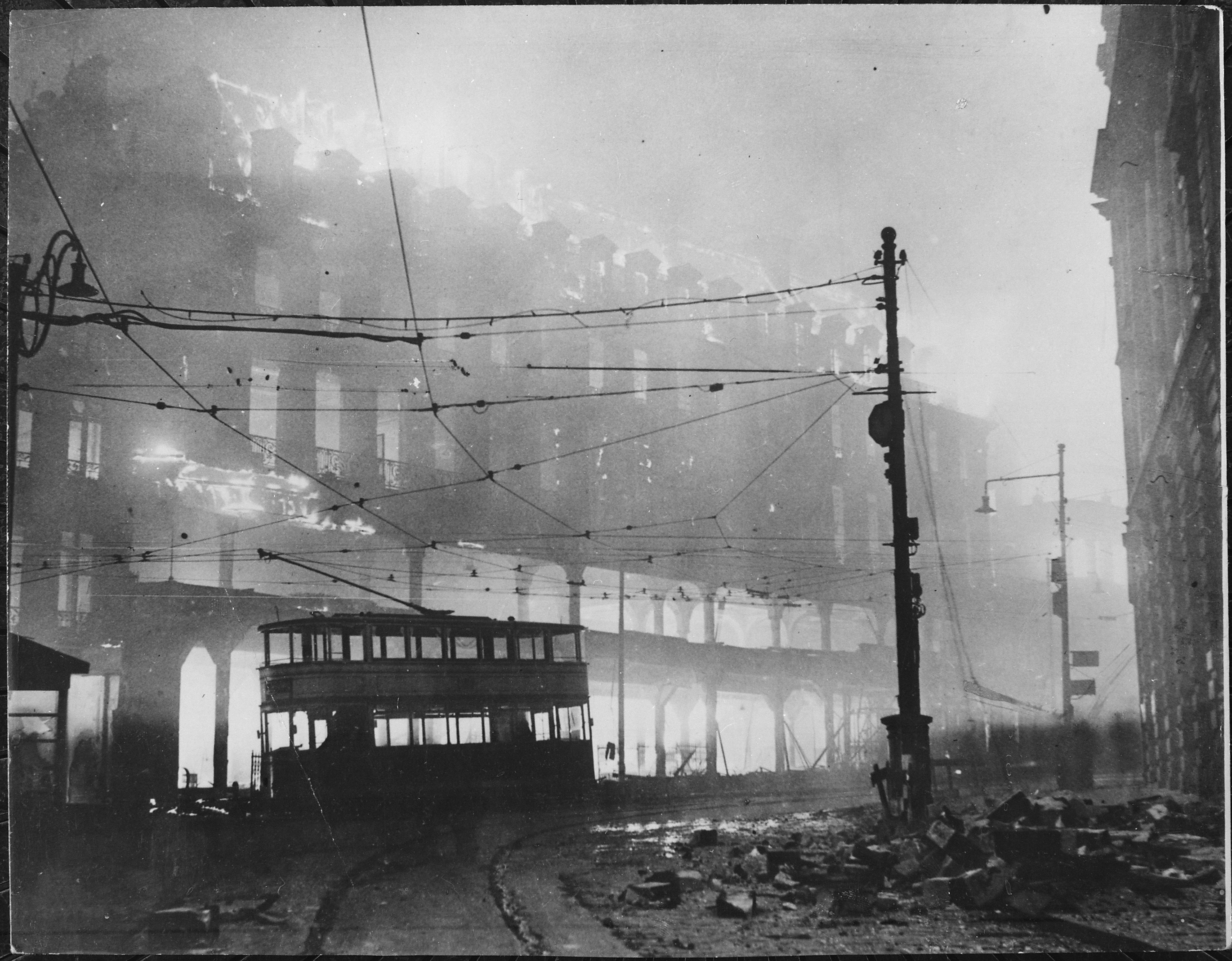
Blitz devastation in Sheffield city centre

The division's fighting units, organised into three AA Brigades, consisted of Heavy Anti-Aircraft (HAA) and Light Anti-Aircraft (LAA) gun regiments and Searchlight (S/L) regiments of the Royal Artillery. The HAA guns were concentrated in the Gun Defence Areas (GDAs) at Hull, Leeds and Sheffield. The LAA units were distributed to defend Vulnerable Points (VPs) such as factories and airfields, while the S/L detachments were disposed in clusters of three, spaced 10,400 yards (9,500 m) apart.

At the time the 10th AA Division was created, the industrial towns of the UK were under regular attack by night, to which the limited AA defences replied as best they could. West Yorkshire, despite its important industrial facilities, steelworks, aircraft and ordnance factories, was at a considerable distance from the Luftwaffe's bases and was less often raided than coastal targets and The Midlands. Nevertheless, in the 10th AA Division's area, Sheffield was badly bombed on 12 and 15 December 1940 (the Sheffield Blitz), Leeds on 14 March 1941 (the Leeds Blitz), Hull on 18 March (the Hull Blitz) and on 7 and 8 May, when Sheffield was also hit again.

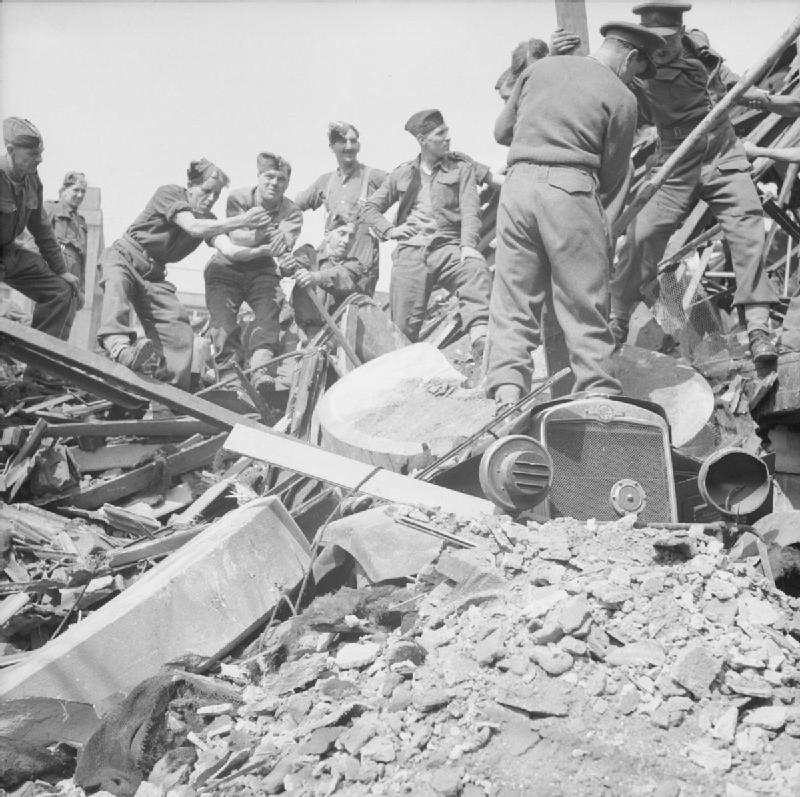
troops of 9th Battalion, The Hampshire Regiment, helping to clear bomb damage in Hull.

There were still too few AA guns for the tasks set them, and in March 1941 AA Command was obliged to shift some HAA guns from Sheffield to Liverpool, which was under much heavier attack. The position on LAA gun sites was worse: only small numbers of Bofors 40 mm guns were available at the start of the Blitz, and most LAA detachments had to make do with Light machine guns (LMGs).

=== Order of Battle 1940–41 ===
The division's composition during the Blitz was as follows:

- 31st (North Midland) AA Brigade – HQ York: responsible for West Yorkshire
  - 87th HAA Rgt – joined by May 1941
  - 38th LAA Rgt (part) – to the 2nd AA Division by May 1941
  - 71st LAA Rgt
  - 43rd (Duke of Wellington's) S/L Rgt
  - 49th (West Yorkshire Regiment) S/L Rgt
  - 54th (Durham Light Infantry) S/L Rgt
- 39th AA Brigade – HQ RAF Digby: responsible for airfields and the Humber Estuary
  - 62nd (Northumbrian) HAA Rgt
  - 91st HAA Rgt
  - 39th LAA Rgt
  - 40th (Sherwood Foresters) S/L Rgt
  - 46th (Lincolnshire Regiment) S/L Rgt – to the 7th AA Division by May 1941
  - 84th S/L Rgt

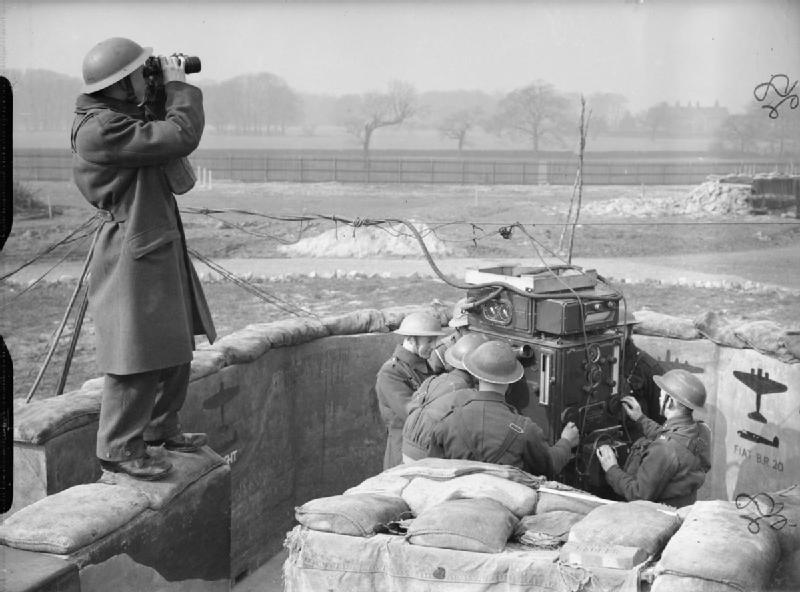
Spotter and predictor operators at a 4.5-inch HAA gun site in Leeds, 20 March 1941.

- 62nd AA Brigade – responsible for Leeds and Sheffield
  - 75th (Home Counties) (Cinque Ports) HAA Rgt
  - 96th HAA Rgt
  - 117th HAA Rgt – new regiment formed in December 1940
  - 59th LAA Rgt – new regiment formed in October 1940
- 2nd AA 'Z' Regiment – new divisional unit equipped with Z Battery rocket launchers, formed in September 1940
- 10th AA Divisional Signals, Royal Corps of Signals (RCS) – formed at York November 1940
- 10th AA Divisional Royal Army Service Corps (RASC)
  - 914th Company – to the 9th AA Division May 1941
  - 926th and 930th Companies
- 10th AA Divisional Company, Royal Army Medical Corps (RAMC)
- 10th AA Divisional Workshop Company, Royal Army Ordnance Corps (RAOC)

== Mid-War ==
Even when the main Blitz ended in May 1941, Hull was an easy target for inexperienced Luftwaffe crews and was frequently bombed and Parachute mines dropped in the Humber Estuary. A special S/L 'Dazzle Barrage' installed at Hull foiled at least one attack, in August 1941. The other gaps in AA defences were filled as more equipment and units became available. Searchlights, now assisted by Searchlight Control (SLC) radar, were reorganised, with a 'Killer Belt' surrounding the Hull GDA to cooperate closely with RAF Night fighters. The HAA and support units increasingly became 'Mixed', indicating that women of the Auxiliary Territorial Service (ATS) were fully integrated into them.

In the spring of 1942, a new phase in the air campaign began with the so-called Baedeker Blitz mainly directed against undefended British cities. In the 10th AA Division's area, York was accurately hit on 28 April, Hull on 19 May and 31 July, and Grimsby on 29 May. The severity of the raid on Hull on 19 May was lessened when many bombs were aimed at a fire started by incendiary bombs landing on an AA site outside the city. Redeployment of resources became necessary to counter the Baedeker raids, mostly to southern England, but also the establishment of a GDA at York. A series of Luftwaffe 'hit and run' raids against towns on the South Coast also led to the withdrawal of many LAA guns. At the same time, experienced units were posted away to train for service overseas (sometimes being lent back to AA Command while awaiting embarkation). This led to a continual turnover of units, which accelerated with the preparations for the invasion of North Africa (Operation Torch) in late 1942.

The 65th AA Brigade HQ joined in June 1942 and several regiments were transferred to it from the 39th AA Brigade. The 62nd AA Brigade HQ left in August 1942 and took part in Operation Torch, landing in North Africa in December.

=== Order of Battle 1941–42 ===
During this period the division was composed as follows (temporary attachments omitted):

- 31st AA Brigade
  - 12th HAA Rgt – from War Office (WO) Reserve August 1942'
  - 87th HAA Rgt – left AA Command June 1941; later to Eighth Army
  - 128th HAA Rgt – from the 62nd AA Brigade August 1942'
  - 71st LAA Rgt – to the 65th AA Brigade June 1942'
  - 114th LAA Rgt – from the 4th AA Division June 1942
  - 30th (Surrey) S/L Rgt – from the 5th AA Division October 1941; to the 11th AA Division January 1942
  - 43rd S/L Rgt – as above
  - 49th S/L Rgt – as above
  - 54th S/L Rgt – as above
- 39th AA Brigade

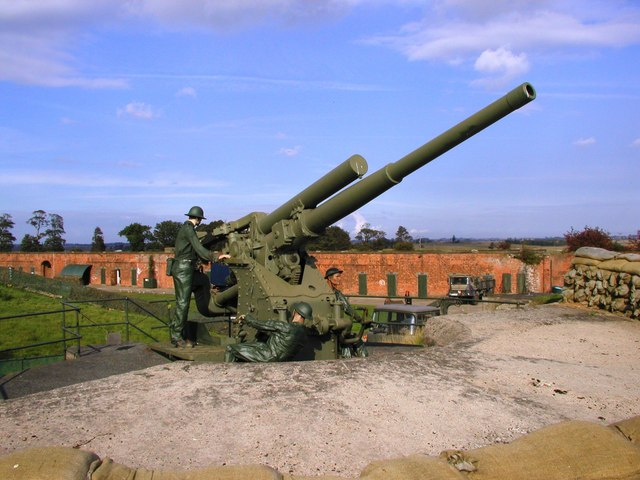
3.7-inch HAA gun preserved at Fort Paull in the Hull GDA (Photo: Andy Beecroft).

  - 62nd HAA Rgt – to WO Control for Operation Torch February–March 1942
  - 91st HAA Rgt – left AA Command May 1942; later to Middle East Forces (MEF)
  - 113th HAA Rgt – from the 2nd AA Division March 1942; to the 65th AA Brigade May 1942
  - 152nd (Mixed) HAA Rgt – from the 62nd AA Brigade August 1942
  - 29th LAA Rgt – from the 4th AA Division February–March 1942; to the 65th AA Brigade May 1942'
  - 39th LAA Rgt – to the 4th AA Division by July 1941
  - 78th LAA Rgt – new regiment formed June 1941; left AA Command and arrived in India by August 1942
  - 121st (Leicestershire Regiment) LAA Rgt – from the 62nd AA Brigade May 1942
  - 40th S/L Rgt – as above
  - 46th S/L Rgt – to the 3rd AA Division by May 1942
  - 84th S/L Rgt – as above
  - 2nd AA 'Z' Rgt – to the 65th AA Brigade May 1942
- 62nd AA Brigade – to WO Control for Operation Torch August 1942
  - 66th (Leeds Rifles) HAA Rgt – from Orkney and Shetland Defences (OSDEF) June 1941; left AA Command and arrived in India by May 1942
  - 75th HAA Rgt – to the 6th AA Division Summer 1941
  - 96th HAA Rgt – left AA Command by May 1942, later to MEF
  - 117th HAA Rgt – to the 4th AA Division by December 1941
  - 128th HAA Rgt – new regiment formed August, joined by December 1941; to the 31st AA Brigade August 1942'
  - 139th (Mixed) HAA Rgt – new regiment formed September 1941, joined January 1942; to the 65th AA Brigade August 1942
  - 152nd (Mixed) HAA Rgt – new regiment formed March 1942, to the 39th AA Brigade August 1942
  - 59th LAA Rgt – left AA Command and arrived in India by April 1942
  - 121st (Leicestershire Regiment) LAA Rgt – converted from 44th S/L Rgt January 1942 to the 39th AA Brigade May 1942
- 65th AA Brigade – from 5 AA Division June 1942
  - 113th HAA Rgt – from the 39th AA Brigade May 1942; to mobile training August 1942
  - 139th HAA Rgt – from the 62nd AA Brigade August 1942
  - 151st (Mixed) HAA Rgt – from the 4th AA Division July 1942
  - 29th LAA Rgt – from the 39th AA Brigade May 1942; to WO Control for Operation Torch June 1942'
  - 71st LAA Rgt – from the 31st AA Brigade August 1942'
  - 2nd AA 'Z' Rgt – from the 39th AA Brigade May 1942

The increased sophistication of communications for Gun Operations Rooms (GORs) and RAF Sectors was reflected in the growth in support units, which attained the following organisation by May 1942:

- 10th AA Division Mixed Signal Unit HQ, RCS
  - HQ No 1 Company
    - 10th AA Division Mixed Signal Office Section
    - 31st AA Brigade Signal Office Mixed Sub-Section
    - 107th RAF Fighter Sector Sub-Section (RAF Church Fenton)
    - 311th AA GOR Mixed Signal Section (Leeds GDA)
    - 24th AA Line Maintenance Section
  - HQ No 2 Company
    - 39th AA Brigade Signal Office Mixed Sub-Section
    - 114th RAF Fighter Sector Sub-Section (RAF Kirton-in-Lindsey)
    - 312th AA GOR Mixed Signal Section (Sheffield GDA)
    - 62nd AA Brigade Signal Office Mixed Sub-Section
    - 408th AA GOR Mixed Signal Section (Humber GDA)
      - 24th AA Sub-GOR Mixed Signal Sub-Section
      - 25th AA Sub-GOR Mixed Signal Sub-Section
      - 26th AA Sub-GOR Mixed Signal Sub-Section
      - 27th AA Sub-GOR Mixed Signal Sub-Section
    - 65th AA Brigade Signal Office Mixed Sub-Section
    - 25th AA Line Maintenance Section
    - 26th AA Line Maintenance Section
- HQ 10th AA Div RASC
  - 926th, 930th Companies
  - 5th AA Tractor Battery – joined June 1942
- 10th AA Div RAMC
- 10th AA Div Workshop Company, RAOC
- 10th AA Div Radio Maintenance Company, RAOC

The RAOC companies became part of the new Royal Electrical and Mechanical Engineers (REME) during 1942.

== Disbandment ==
A reorganisation of AA Command in October 1942 saw the AA divisions disbanded and replaced by a smaller number of AA Groups more closely aligned with the groups of RAF Fighter Command. The 10th AA Division, which had been at Sand Hutton, outside York, but was by now at Leeds, merged with 2nd AA Division to form 5th AA Group based at Nottingham and cooperating with No. 12 Group RAF.

== General Officers Commanding ==
The following officers commanded 10th AA Division:

- Major-General Langley Browning, from 14 November 1940 to 13 February 1942
- Major-General Erroll Tremlett, promoted 14 February 1942 from command of the 44th AA Brigade, until disbandment

== External sources ==
- Anti-Aircraft Command (1940) at British Military History
- Generals of World War II
- Royal Artillery 1939–1945
