= 51st (Leeds Rifles) Royal Tank Regiment =

- Active: 1939–1956
- Country: United Kingdom
- Branch: British Army
- Type: Armoured
- Size: Regiment
- Garrison/HQ: Leeds, Yorkshire
- Anniversaries: Cambrai Day (20 November)
- Engagements: World War II
- Decorations: Maple Leaf
- Battle honours: 'North Africa', 'Italy'

The 51st (Leeds Rifles) Royal Tank Regiment (51 RTR) was an armoured regiment of the British Territorial Army that fought in the Tunisian and Italian campaigns during World War II and continued to serve during the 1950s.

== Origin ==
In April 1938, the 7th (Leeds Rifles) Battalion, West Yorkshire Regiment converted to the armoured role as the 45th (Leeds Rifles) Battalion, Royal Tank Regiment. The Leeds Rifles was a long-standing Territorial Army (TA) infantry unit, founded by volunteers from the city of Leeds in 1859. In June 1939, the company based at Morley was split off to form the cadre for a duplicate unit, the 51st (Leeds Rifles) Bn, Royal Tank Regiment.

== World War II ==
On the outbreak of war in September 1939, 51 RTR was part of the 25th Army Tank Brigade, in Northern Command, alongside the Newcastle-based TA regiments 43 RTR and 49 RTR.

=== Motor Machine Gun Battalion ===
At the end of May 1940, with the British Expeditionary Force (BEF) being evacuated from Dunkirk and the imminent threat of German invasion of England, the 25th Army Tank Brigade was redesignated 2nd Motor Machine Gun Brigade and its regiments reorganised accordingly. Each of 51 RTR's three MMG squadrons consisted of three troops, each with six Humber Snipe or Hillman Utility ('Tilly') two-seat cars, two carrying Vickers medium machine guns, two Bren light machine guns and two Boys anti-tank rifles. In July 1940, volunteers from the units of 25th Army Tank Brigade formed No 5 Troop of No. 5 Commando at Bridlington. In August, 51 RTR and the rest of the brigade moved to Northumberland to guard the coastline with machine gun posts along the cliffs and sand dunes.

The 25th Army Tank Brigade was reconstituted at the end of 1940, and its regiments began to receive a trickle of tanks on which to train. By the end of 1942, 51 RTR was fully trained and fully equipped with Churchill tanks. In January 1943, the regiment embarked, with the rest of the 25th Tank Brigade, for North Africa, where it came under the command of V Corps of the British First Army in the Tunisian Campaign.

=== Tunisia ===
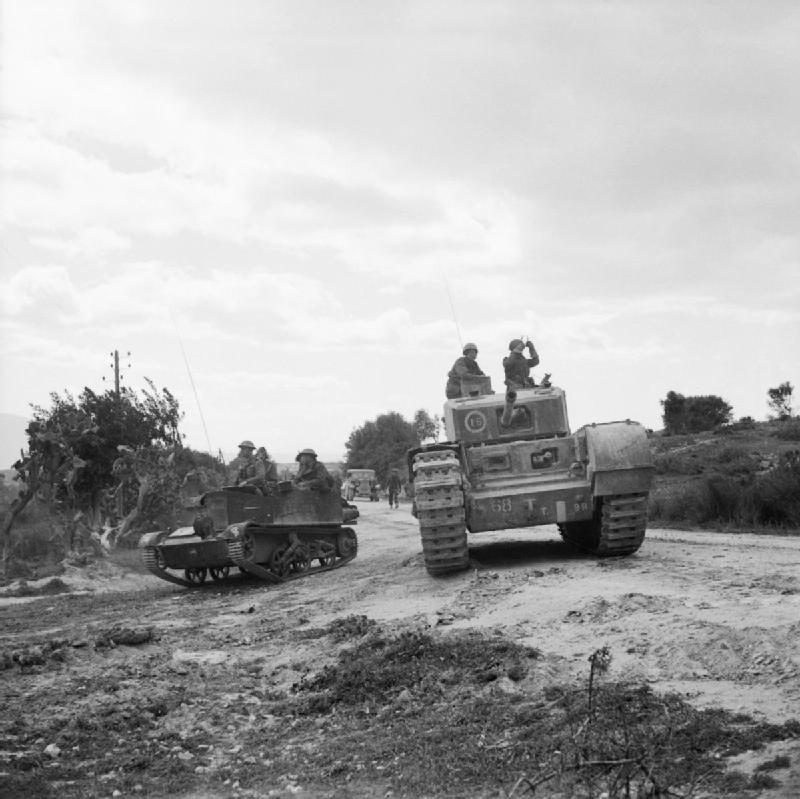
A Universal Carrier and a Churchill tank of 51st Royal Tank Regiment during 6th Armoured Division's attack on the town of Pichon, Tunisia, 8 April 1943.

The regiment took part in containing the German offensive of Operation Ochsenkopf in February - March 1943. At a place called Steamroller farm, two Churchill tanks ambushed and shot up an entire German transport column before rejoining the rest of their squadron. The result was the destruction of two 88 mm, two 75 mm, two 50 mm and four smaller calibre anti-tank guns, twenty-five wheeled vehicles, two 3-inch Mortars, two Mark III tanks and nearly 200 Axis casualties.

On 7–8 April, 51 RTR supported IX Corps at Fondouk Pass. The 128th (Hampshire) Brigade of 46th Infantry Division crossed the Wadi Marguellil during the night and at 5.30 am on 8 April began its main attack, supported by 'C' Sqn 51 RTR, and by noon was on its objective. The regiment ended the campaign in Army reserve.

The 25th Tank Brigade came under the command of Brigadier James Noel Tetley of the Leeds Rifles at the end of the Tunisia campaign. He was the only Territorial Army officer of the Royal Tank Regiment to command a brigade on active service. The brigade, including 51 RTR, remained training in North Africa for almost a year, before they were required for service on the Italian Front. The regiment celebrated Cambrai Day (20 November, commemorating the tank Battle of Cambrai) in Algeria. 51 RTR embarked on 16 April 1944 and landed at Naples, where it was equipped with Churchill tanks, with a few Shermans and Stuarts.

=== Italy ===
The brigade distinguished itself in support of the 1st Canadian Infantry Division in the assault on the Hitler Line in May 1944. At the request of the Canadians, its regiments adopted the Maple leaf as an additional badge, later worn by 51 RTR's successors, the Leeds Detachment (Leeds Rifles), Imphal (PWO) Company, East and West Riding Regiment. Brigadier Tetley, formerly of the Leeds Rifles himself, was the only TA RTR officer to command a brigade on active service. 51 RTR went on to fight in the Gothic Line battles of August–September 1944.

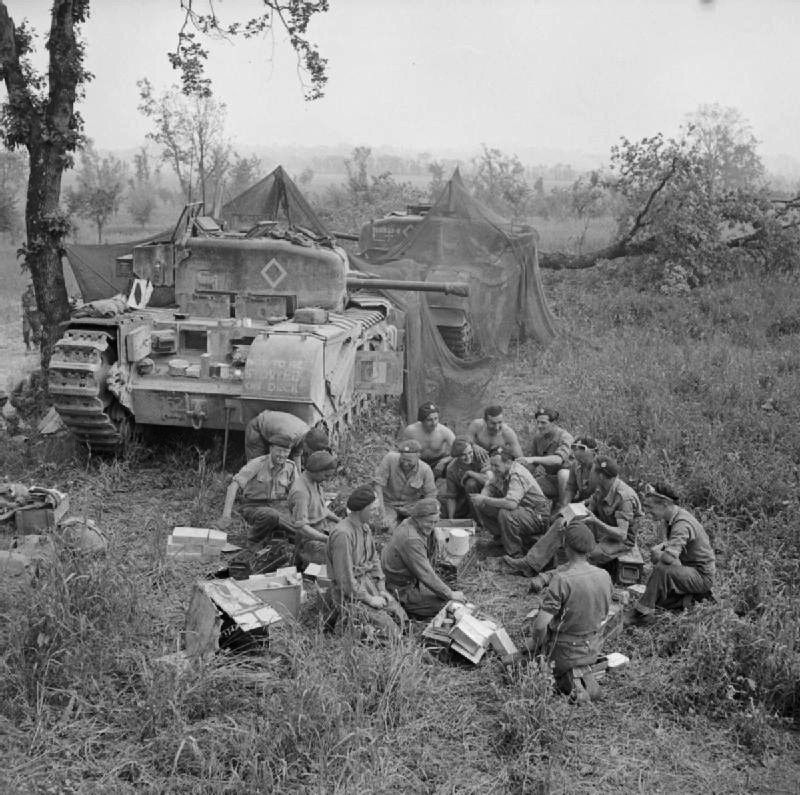
Churchill tank crews of HQ Troop, 51 RTR share out rations near their camouflaged vehicles before going into action in support of the 1st Canadian Division, Italy, 17 May 1944.

To deal with the successive enemy lines of defences anticipated in the later stages of the campaign, it was decided in late 1944 to convert the brigade into the 25th Assault Engineer Brigade, equipped with the specialized tanks known as Hobart's Funnies. Organised on 5 January 1945, this was primarily a Royal Engineers formation, but 51 RTR remained in the brigade, although converted to specialised armour. 'B' Squadron received 15 Crab Mark II flail tanks, while 'A' and 'C' sqns had a total of 32 Churchill Crocodile flamethrowing tanks. Each squadron in the brigade was self-administering, so that they could be detached where required.

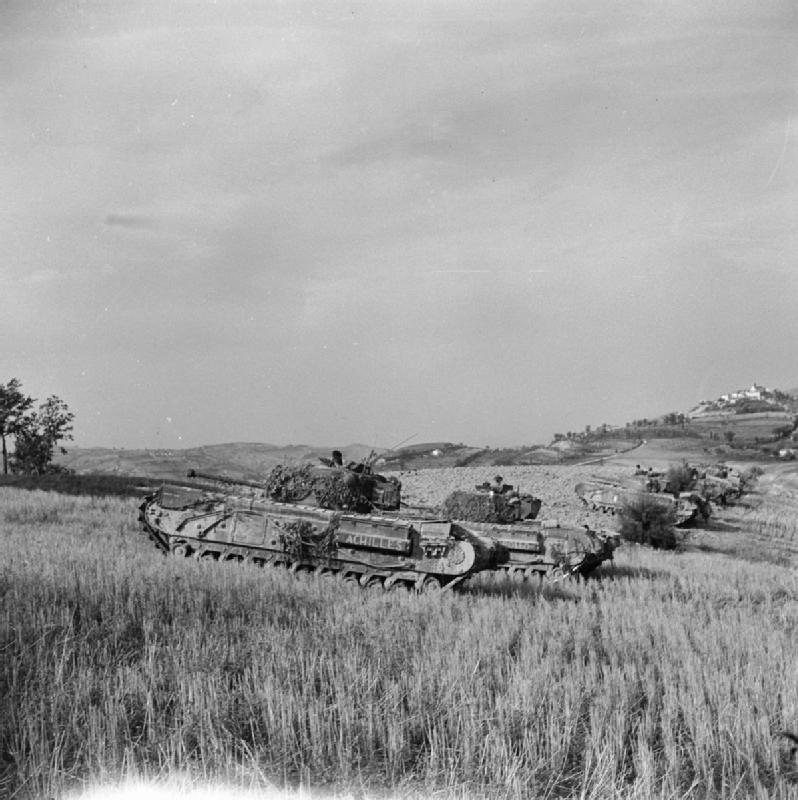
Churchill tanks of 51 RTR lined up below a crest near the River Foglia, 30 August 1944. The tanks were supporting infantry of the 139th Brigade attacking across the river.

25 Armoured Assault Brigade first went into action at the crossing of the Senio on 9 April 1945. 51 RTR was attached to the 2nd New Zealand and 8th Indian Divisions. The flamethrowing tanks crept forward during the preliminary bombardment and positioned themselves close to the floodbank as possible. One minute before the infantry assault started, the positions were flamed. Most of the Crocodiles had to be 60 feet behind the bank to be able to direct their flame over the bank. World War II in Europe ended shortly after this operation.

== Postwar ==
When the Territorial Army was reformed after the war, it included a combined 45th/51st (Leeds Rifles) RTR. The personnel received their tank training from 'A' Sqn of 6 RTR at RAF Worksop. Brigadier Noel Tetley was the honorary colonel.

In 1956, the 45th/51st (Leeds Rifles) RTR returned to the infantry role under its old title of 7th (Leeds Rifles) Bn West Yorkshire Regiment. It carried the honorary distinction on its colours and appointments of the badge of the Royal Tank Regiment with the dates '1942-45' and two scrolls inscribed 'North Africa' and 'Italy'.

== External sources ==
- Yorkshire Volunteers website
- Land Forces of Britain, the Empire and Commonwealth
- Prince of Wales's Own Regiment of Yorkshire Museum
- Merseyside RTR (Brian Gill's website)
