= 45th (Leeds Rifles) Royal Tank Regiment =

- Active: 1938–43; 1947–56
- Country: United Kingdom
- Branch: British Army
- Type: Armoured
- Size: Regiment
- Garrison/HQ: Leeds
- Engagements: Second Battle of El Alamein
- Battle honours: 'North Africa'

Commanders
- Notable commanders: James Noel Tetley

The 45th (Leeds Rifles) Royal Tank Regiment (45 RTR) was an armoured regiment of the British Territorial Army that fought at the Battle of Alamein during World War II and continued to serve during the 1950s.

== Origin ==
In April 1938, the 7th (Leeds Rifles) Battalion, West Yorkshire Regiment was converted to the armoured role, becoming part of the Royal Tank Regiment, as the 45th (Leeds Rifles) Battalion, Royal Tank Regiment. The Leeds Rifles was a long-standing Territorial Army (TA) infantry unit, founded by volunteers from the city of Leeds in 1859. In June 1939, the company based at Morley was split off to form the cadre for a duplicate unit, the 51st (Leeds Rifles) Battalion, Royal Tank Regiment.

== World War II ==
On the outbreak of war in September 1939, 45th (Leeds Rifles) RTR formed part of the 24th Army Tank Brigade, a 2nd Line Territorial Army formation in Northern Command, in which it served alongside the Oldham-based TA regiments, 41 RTR and its duplicate, 47 RTR.

At this time, 45 RTR was commanded by Lieutenant Colonel Noel Tetley, a member of the Tetley brewing family that had helped raise the original Leeds Rifles and subsequently provided many senior officers for the regiment. There were almost no armoured fighting vehicles available for the TA regiments, and the few possessed by 45 RTR were deployed for airfield defence in North East England during the Battle of Britain. Later in the year, 24th Army Tank Brigade was redesignated 24th Armoured Brigade and became part of a new 8th Armoured Division. During 1941, the regiment moved to the South of England to continue its training. In December 1941, Lt-Col Tetley was promoted out of the regiment to command a tank brigade, and was replaced by Lt-Col S.C. Dumbreck of the Royal Dragoons.

In May 1942, 45 RTR embarked at Liverpool for the Middle East, sailing round the Cape and reaching Egypt in July. There, the crews began training on Grant tanks, but by September they were equipped with a mix of Sherman tanks (codenamed 'Swallows') and Crusaders, but was not apparently brought up to full establishment. 8th Armoured Division was not yet complete, so 24th Armoured Brigade was attached to 10th Armoured Division for the forthcoming Second Battle of El Alamein.

45 RTR went into action alongside 41 and 47 RTR on the second day of the battle (D+1, 24 October), as 10th Armoured pushed towards Miteira. Its tanks engaged enemy anti-tank guns and entrenched infantry before withdrawing at dusk. The next day (D+2), 45 RTR moved into battle positions, supporting 41 and 47 RTR with gunfire. The enemy anti-tank guns were well dug in and had to be engaged by observing their flashes. One German infantry post was overrun by a troop of tanks firing their machine-guns into the trenches. The regiment withdrew again at dusk, leaving one defence squadron on the ridge. On D+3, there was confused fighting ahead of the regiment. During D+4, 45 RTR remained on the ridge all day, covering 41 and 47 RTR as they advanced through the gaps in the minefields. On the night of 27/28 October, the CO was ordered to advance at first light on D+5 to support an infantry brigade, but as the regiment only had about 20 tanks, 41 RTR was ordered to make up the numbers. The Crusader squadron had only gone a few hundred yards when it came upon some infantry digging in, and stopped. But Dumbreck had been told that the infantry he was supporting had definitely reached their objective, so one of the Sherman squadrons pushed on towards the ridge SE of the feature known as 'Snipe', supported by the other, which engaged German tanks coming from Snipe. It emerged that the infantry had not achieved their objective, and 45 RTR withdrew under shellfire. During this unsatisfactory action, the regiment lost 10 tanks and suffered 11 men killed or died of wounds, 10 missing believed dead, and 34 wounded, mainly from mines and shellfire. At the end of the day, 45 RTR handed its remaining tanks over to other regiments and was withdrawn into reserve.

After the battle, 45th (Leeds Rifles) RTR was sent a message of congratulations from the Lord Mayor of Leeds, but the regiment had fought its only battle. Over succeeding months, 24 Armoured Bde's officers and men were progressively posted away to other units. However, the planned dispersal of 45 RTR was cancelled, and it took in the remaining details of 41 and 47 RTR to become a holding unit. In this role, it received large drafts of reinforcements from the United Kingdom before they were posted to other regiments. Nevertheless, on 8 March 1943, 45 RTR was finally disbanded and replaced by a Royal Armoured Corps holding unit.

== Postwar ==
When the Territorial Army was reformed after the war, it included a combined 45th/51st (Leeds Rifles) RTR. The personnel received their tank training from 'A' Sqn of 6 RTR at RAF Worksop. Brigadier Noel Tetley was the honorary colonel.

In 1956, the 45th/51st (Leeds Rifles) RTR returned to the infantry role under its old title of 7th (Leeds Rifles) Battalion, West Yorkshire Regiment. It carried the honorary distinction on its colours and appointments of the badge of the Royal Tank Regiment with dates '1942-45' and two scrolls inscribed 'North Africa' and 'Italy' (51 RTR fought in the Italian Campaign).
