= 49th Royal Tank Regiment =

British Army Regiment

49th Regiment Royal Tank Regiment
- Active: 1939–1945
- Disbanded: 13 December 1945
- Country: United Kingdom
- Branch: British Army
- Type: Armoured regiment
- Role: Specialised armour
- Part of: Royal Armoured Corps

49th Royal Tank Regiment (49 RTR), later 49th Armoured Personnel Carrier Regiment and 49th Armoured Carrier Regiment, was a regiment of the British Army's Royal Armoured Corps during World War II that operated specialised armoured fighting vehicles in North West Europe.

== Origin and training ==
As part of the rearmament of the British Army before World War II, the 6th Battalion Royal Northumberland Fusiliers, a Territorial Army infantry battalion, was converted to the armoured role on 1 November 1938, under the designation 43rd (6th City) Battalion, The Royal Northumberland Fusiliers, Royal Tank Regiment, or '43 RTR' for short. During 1939, it formed 49 RTR as a duplicate regiment. The regiments shared St George's Drill Hall in Newcastle upon Tyne as their depot. While 43 RTR used the conventional 'A', 'B' and 'C' squadron designations, 49 RTR adopted 'X', 'Y' and 'Z' for its squadrons. Both regiments were part of 25th Army Tank Brigade.

In August 1939, 49 RTR had still not received any tanks, so it mobilised as an infantry unit, and spent the Phoney War on guard duty in North East England. In April 1940, it finally received a few old tanks for instruction (one Vickers Medium per squadron, and one Matilda for the regimental headquarters) plus some old cars. In May, the regiment moved to Catterick Camp to begin armoured training.

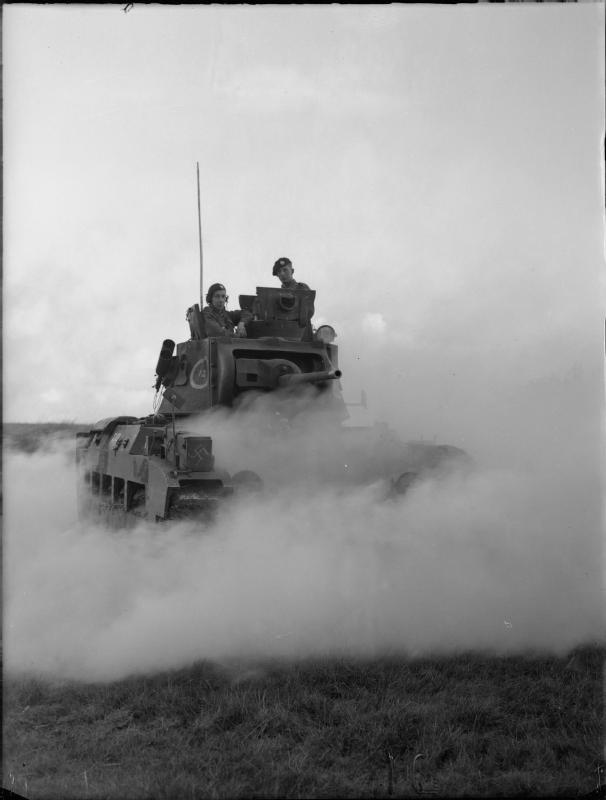
Matilda tank of 49 RTR advances through a smoke screen during an exercise near Dover, UK, 23 October 1941

At the end of May 1940, with the British Expeditionary Force being evacuated from Dunkirk and the imminent threat of German invasion of England, 25th Army Tank Brigade was redesignated 2nd Motor Machine Gun Brigade and its regiments reorganised accordingly. Each MMG squadron consisted of three troops, each with six Austin Utility ('Tilly') two-seat cars, two carrying Vickers medium machine guns, two Bren light machine guns and two Boys anti-tank rifles. In July 1940, volunteers from the units of 25th Army Tank Brigade formed No 5 Troop of No. 5 Commando at Bridlington.

In August, 49 RTR and the rest of the brigade moved to Northumberland to guard the coastline with machine gun posts along the cliffs and sand dunes. In November 1940, the brigade moved to the Dukeries area of Nottinghamshire for armoured training; 49 RTR was posted to Rufford Abbey but soon afterwards left the brigade and joined 1st Army Tank Brigade at East Grinstead in Sussex.

Now 49 RTR returned its 'Tillies' to store and began intensive infantry tank training on the South Downs with new Matilda II tanks. It finally adopted the usual 'A', 'B' and 'C' designations for its squadrons. Later in 1941, the regiment came once more under 25th Army Tank Brigade, which had reconverted from the motor machine gun role and moved to the South Coast.

== Specialised armour ==
In January 1942, 49 RTR moved to Lowther Castle, near Penrith, to train in a new role as a night fighting tank battalion equipped with Canal Defence Lights (CDLs). These carried a powerful searchlight fitted to a Matilda tank, replacing the turret and main armament. In July 1943, the Matilda CDLs were replaced by Grant tank CDLs, which retained the 75 mm main gun in a sponson. During this period, 49 RTR joined 35th Army Tank Brigade, which later formed part of 79th Armoured Division, which concentrated all the specialised armour units training for the Invasion of Normandy.

49 RTR landed in France on 12 August 1944 as part of 1st Tank Brigade in 79th Armoured, but there was no call for CDLs in the Normandy campaign. The regiment was issued with conventional Sherman gun tanks in addition to their Grant CDLs, and during October, 49 RTR supplied Sherman crews to other regiments that required reinforcements; 3 complete troops (about 40 men and 2 officers) to the Sherwood Rangers Yeomanry on 7 October; 10 crews to the Royal Scots Greys and 12 drivers to the 3rd/4th County of London Yeomanry (Sharpshooters) on 17 October).

Next, the Grant CDLs were returned to the training unit at Lowther. The whole of 1st Tank Brigade was being broken up to provide drafts to other regiments, and it appeared that 49 RTR was to share that fate. However, reduced to two squadrons ('A' and 'C'), the regiment was redesignated "49th Armoured Personnel Carrier Regiment" (49 APCR) and re-equipped with Ram Kangaroos (obsolete Canadian-built Ram tanks, similar to Shermans, with their turrets removed to transport an infantry section). Each squadron could carry one battalion. First Canadian Army already had an APC regiment (1st Canadian Armoured Carrier Regiment), and 49 APCR would perform the same role for Second British Army.

== Operational career ==
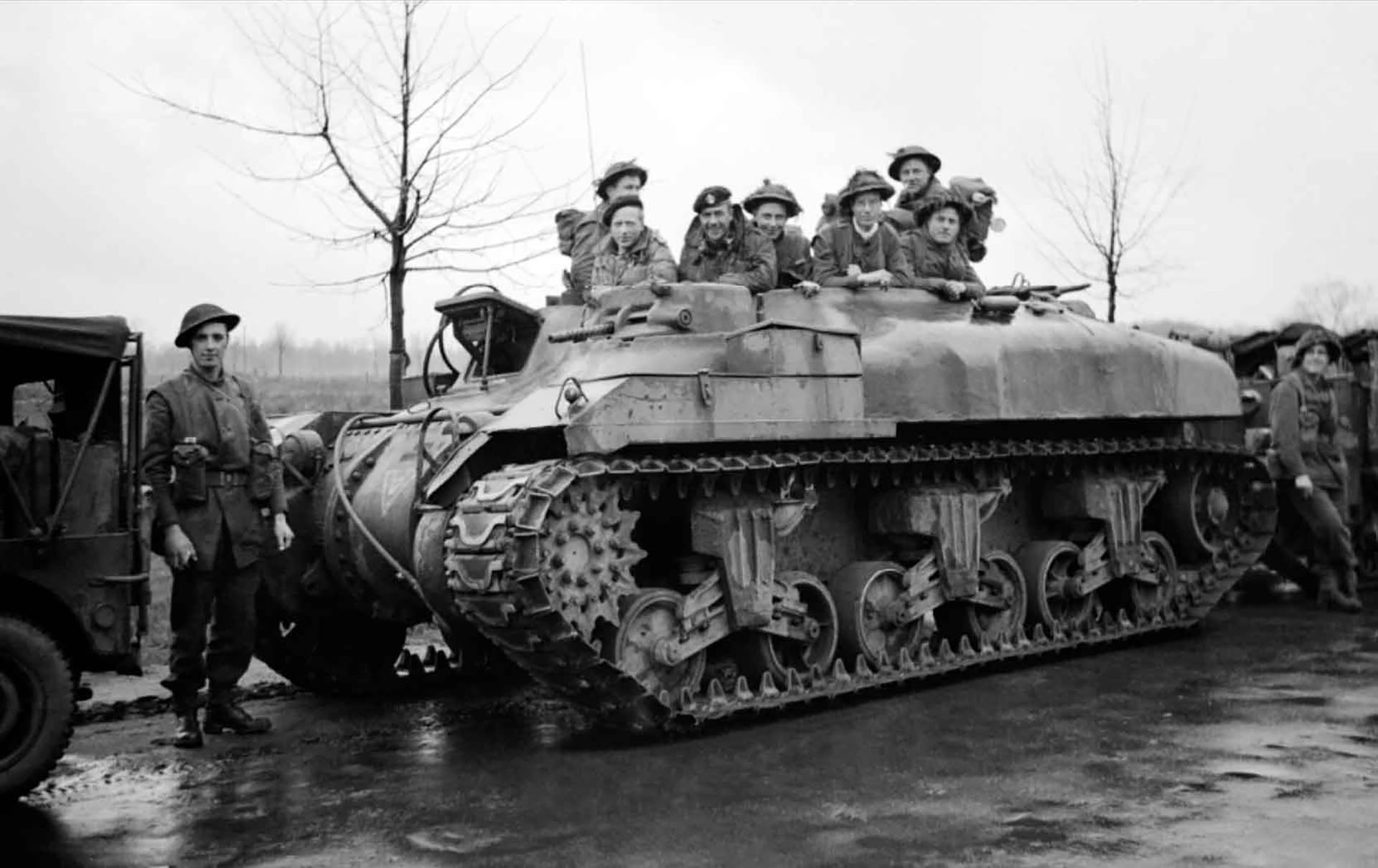
Infantry of the 53rd (Welsh) Division in a Ram Kangaroo on the outskirts of Ochtrup, Germany, 3 April 1945

49 RTR finally went into action on the night of 13/14 November 1944, ferrying forward troops of 51st (Highland) Infantry Division. The value of the new vehicles was soon appreciated. Lieutenant-General Brian Horrocks, commanding XXX Corps, later wrote that Kangaroos 'proved a great boon in the closing stages of the war... I once saw a whole brigade of the 51st Highland Division in these vehicles being heavily shelled by the Germans. I thought their casualties were bound to be high, but they had only two men wounded'.

On 3 December, 49 APCR took part in Operation Guildford, the assault on Blerick, a heavily defended suburb of the Dutch town of Venlo. The Kangaroos advanced behind a creeping barrage along lanes cut through the minefields and anti-tank ditch by flail tanks and bridgelaying tanks. They delivered the attacking infantry (8th Battalion Royal Scots and 6th Battalion Royal Scots Fusiliers) close to their objectives and, although some Kangaroos were disabled by mines, the squadrons returned for two more battalions. In the words of the Official History, 'from that point the taking of the town proved to be a walk-over'.

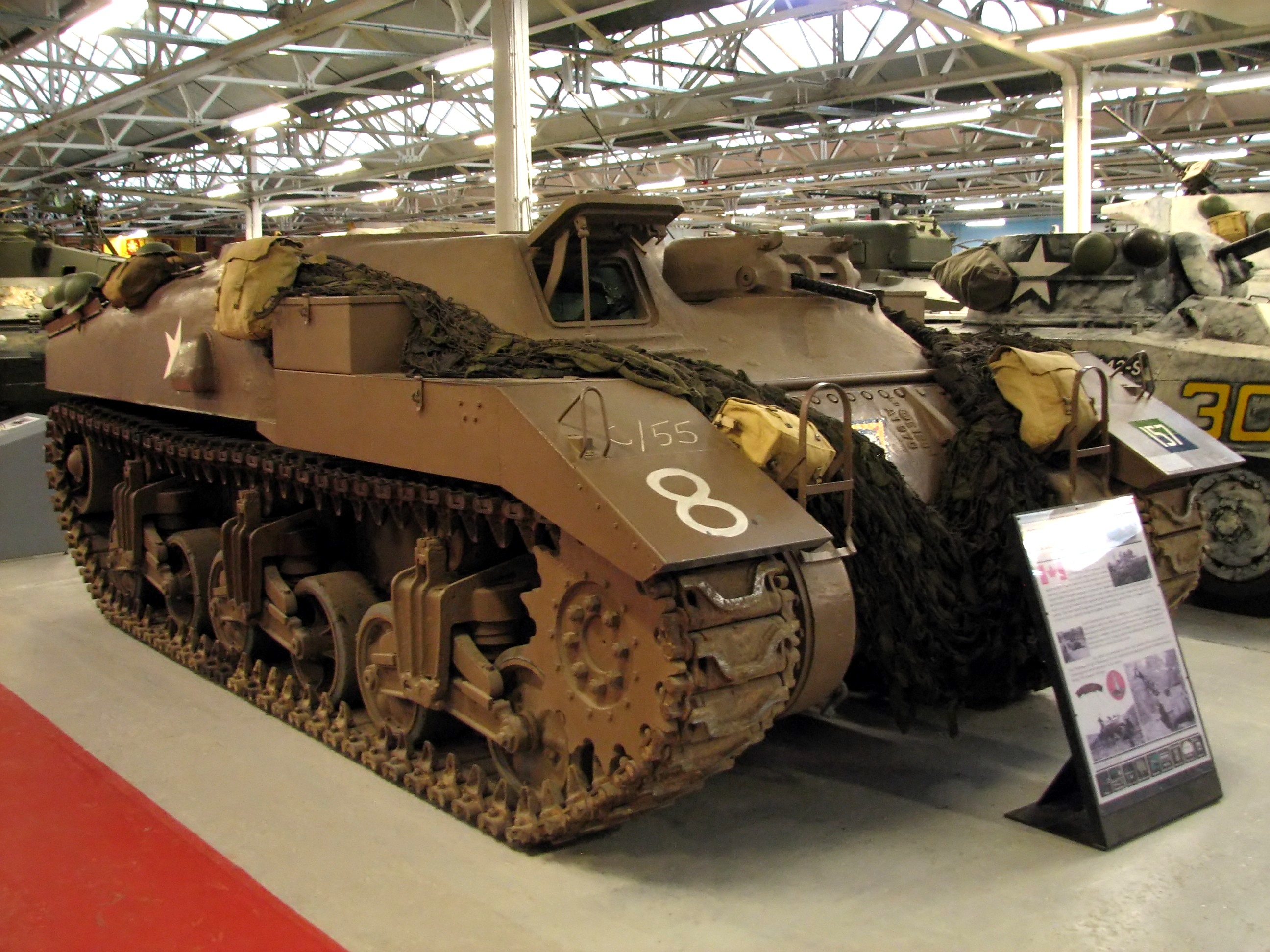
Ram Kangaroo at the Bovington Tank Museum

During February 1945 49 APCR was kept busy during Operation Veritable, the advance on Kleve, and made newspaper headlines by the manner in which they forced their way into Goch.

For the assault crossing of the Rhine, Operation Plunder, 49 APCR formed 'B' Independent Squadron. This was equipped with Grant CDLs, brought back from Lowther. The operation was carried out under 'artificial moonlight' (searchlights shining onto the cloud cover) and during the assault on Rees by the 51st (Highland) Division the Grants both illuminated the crossing and engaged the enemy on the far bank with their 75mm guns. Meanwhile, A and C Sqns ferried Highlanders forward to the crossing points.

Once over the Rhine and until the end of the campaign, Kangaroos were used extensively to move infantry forward rapidly over territory recaptured from the enemy. 49 APCR formed 'F' Squadron to increase the number of vehicles available.

As a hostilities-only unit, 49 RTR was quickly disbanded after the end of World War II, a process that was complete by 13 December 1945.
