= 25th Army Tank Brigade =

25th Army Tank Brigade 2nd Motor Machine Gun Brigade 25th Army Tank Brigade 25th Tank Brigade
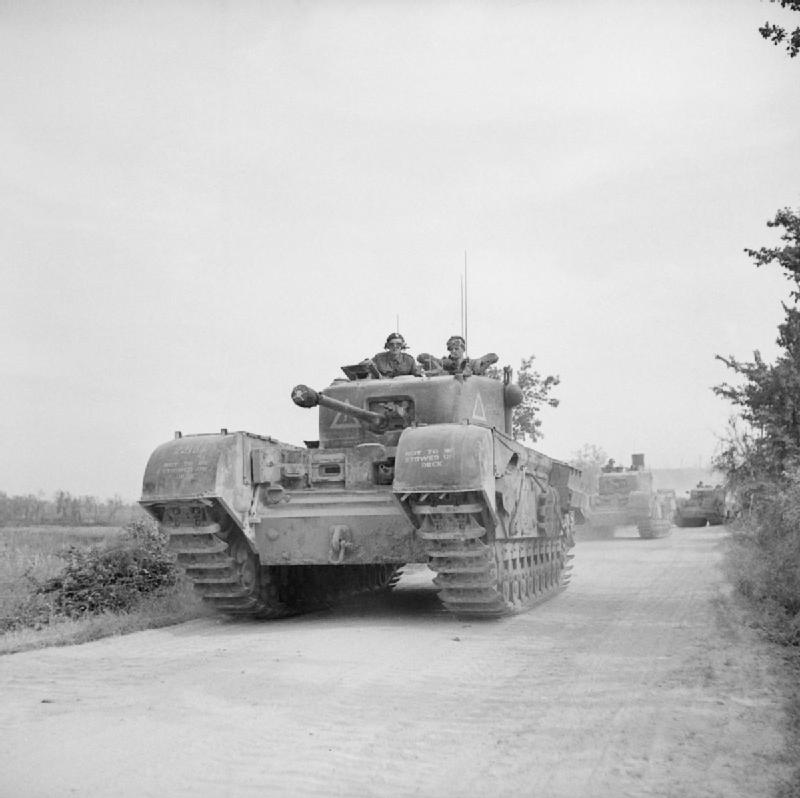
- Churchill tanks of the 25th Tank Brigade going forward to support the 1st Canadian Division, Italy, 17 May 1944. This was the first deployment of Churchills in the Italian Campaign.
- Active: 1939–1945
- Country: United Kingdom
- Branch: British Army
- Type: Armoured
- Size: Brigade
- Engagements: Tunisia Campaign, Italian Campaign

The 25th Army Tank Brigade was an armoured brigade formation of the British Army that was active before and during the Second World War. It served with the British First Army and the British Eighth Army during the battles in North Africa and Italy.

== History ==
The unit was formed on 3 September 1939 as a 2nd Line Territorial Army Tank Brigade, but had very few tanks. On 28 May 1940, it was converted to the 2nd Motor Machine Gun Brigade in recognition of this lack of tanks, but converted back to an Army Tank Brigade on 10 December 1940. It was redesignated the 25th Tank Brigade on 1 June 1942.

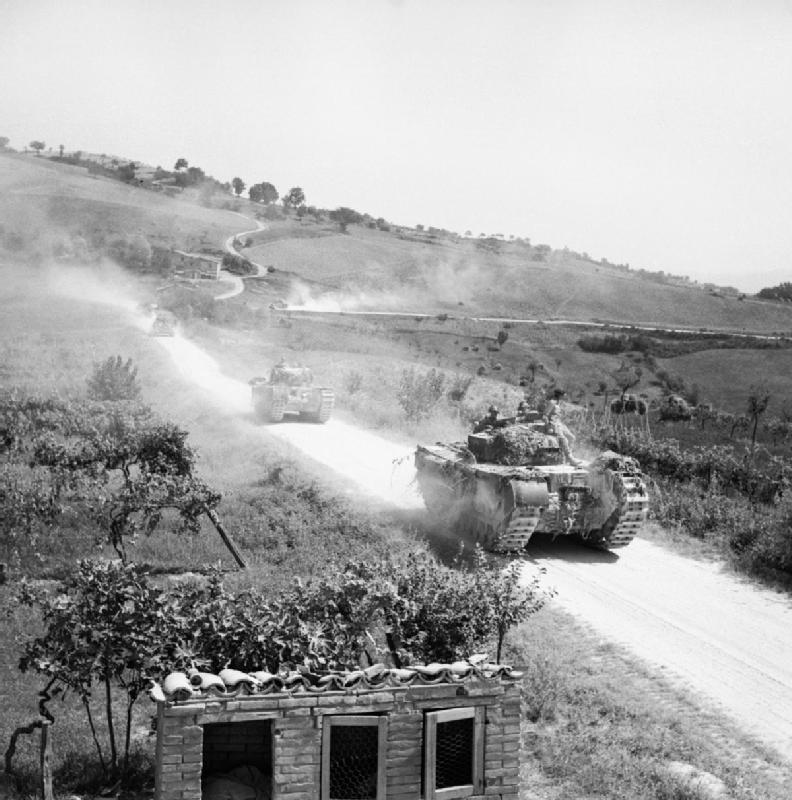
Churchill tanks of 51st Royal Tank Regiment move forward near Isola del Piano in support of 138th Brigade during the advance on the Gothic Line, Italy.

It fought in Tunisia under the British First Army and in the Italian Campaign, as part of the British Eighth Army.

== Commanding officers ==
- Brig. T.D. Murray
- Brig. R.H. Maxwell
- Lieut. Col. D. Dawnay (acting)
- Brig. James Noel Tetley
- Brig. E.W.H. Clarke

== Order of battle ==
- 43rd Royal Tank Regiment (until 28 May 1940, rejoined 27 April, left 17 October 1941)
- 49th Royal Tank Regiment (until 28 May 1940, rejoined 27 April 1941, left 28 February 1942)
- 51st (Leeds Rifles) Royal Tank Regiment (until 28 May, rejoined 10 December 1940, left 1 January 1945)
- 11th Royal Tank Regiment (from 10 December 1940, left 26 April 1941, rejoined 29 February, left 5 August 1942)
- 12th Royal Tank Regiment (from 10 December 1940, left 26 April 1941)
- 142nd Regiment Royal Armoured Corps (from 9 November 1941, disbanded 18 December 1944)
- 151st Regiment Royal Armoured Corps (from 5 August, left 2 September 1942)
- North Irish Horse (from 3 September 1942 until 3 December 1944)

== See also ==
- British Armoured formations of World War II
- British Army Order of Battle (September 1939)
- List of British brigades of the Second World War
