= Tynemouth Volunteer Artillery =

British Army unit

- Active: 16 August 1859–present
- Country: United Kingdom
- Branch: Territorial Army
- Type: Artillery Regiment
- Role: Garrison Artillery; Coastal Artillery; Infantry; Anti-Aircraft Artillery
- Garrison/HQ: Tynemouth

The Tynemouth Volunteer Artillery claims to be the oldest volunteer artillery unit of the British Army. It served coastal and siege guns in World War I and World War II, and also served in the infantry role.

== Artillery Volunteers 1859-1908 ==
The first artillery unit formed amid the enthusiasm that created the British Volunteer Force in the mid-19th Century was the 1st Northumberland Artillery Volunteer Corps (AVC), which was raised after a public meeting at Tynemouth on 7 May 1859. The meeting was held in response to statements by Commander Bedford Pim, Royal Navy, that a modern ironclad warship could do untold damage to the towns of Tyneside due to the poor state of their defences. The unit was raised by Edward Potter of Cramlington, a local coal mining engineer. By 25 May 1859, the first drill was held for Rifle and Artillery volunteers at Tynemouth, formal enrolment for the 1st Northumberland Artillery Volunteers opened on 2 August, and the corps was formally accepted on 16 August 1859. In November 1859, the new unit held its first gun practice, on two 70-year-old muzzle-loading smoothbore cannon at Tynemouth Castle.

A 2nd Northumberland AVC was formed at Tynemouth on 12 January 1860 but, in May 1860, it was absorbed into the 1st as its second battery; four other batteries were raised at Willington Quay, Newcastle upon Tyne and North Shields. (Note: No 3 Battery 15 August 1860, No 4 Battery 16 August 1860, No 5 Battery 12 October 1860, No 6 Battery later.) Other AVCs were also being formed in the area: the Percy Artillery, raised from tenants of the Duke of Northumberland and named after a previous volunteer unit of 1805, was formed as the 3rd Northumberland AVC on 22 March 1860, then took the vacated position as 2nd. A new 3rd Northumberland AVC of two batteries was formed at Blyth on 23 November 1860, but was disbanded in January 1864. In September that year, the Newcastle members of the Tynemouth Volunteers left to form a separate 2nd Newcastle AVC and in January 1865 the Willington Quay men became the 3rd Northumberland AVC.

The 1st Administrative Brigade of Northumberland Artillery Volunteers was formed at Tynemouth on 4 April 1866 (Note: Or in January 1865.) and included the 1st Northumberland (Tyneside Volunteers) and both its offshoots, the 2nd Newcastle and the 3rd Northumberland. (The 1st Newcastle and 2nd Northumberland (Percy Artillery) AVCs remained independent.) The 2nd Newcastle was absorbed into the 3rd Northumberland in 1868, in which year the brigade's HQ moved from Tynemouth to Newcastle. The 1st Durham AVC was added to the Admin Brigade in 1873.

The Volunteers were consolidated into larger units in 1880, and the Administrative Brigade became the 1st Northumberland and Durham Artillery Volunteers on 23 July with its HQ at Newcastle:

- Nos 1–6 Companies from 1st Northumberland AVC (Tynemouth)
- Nos 7–12 Companies from 3rd Northumberland AVC (Newcastle)
- Nos 13–15 Companies from 1st Durham AVC (Sunderland)

However, the Tynemouth Volunteers were withdrawn to become independent again in April 1881. They were supposed to become the new 3rd Northumberland, but objected to the title, asserting their primacy, and in August were renamed The Tynemouth Artillery Volunteers (with emphasis on the definite article 'The'). The unit became part of the RA's Northern Division on 1 April 1882, then the Western Division on 1 July 1889. By now, the unit had eight batteries.

In the early years, the volunteer gunners practised on whatever guns were available, including those at Tynemouth Castle. But, in addition to manning fixed coast defence artillery, some of the early Artillery Volunteers manned semi-mobile 'position batteries' of smooth-bore field guns pulled by agricultural horses. The Tynemouth Artillery Volunteers were supplied with light 9-pounder field guns in 1869. But the War Office refused to pay for the upkeep of field guns for Volunteers and they had largely died in the 1870s. In 1888, the 'position artillery' concept was revived and some Volunteer companies were reorganised as position batteries to work alongside the Volunteer infantry brigades. The Tynemouth Volunteer Artillery were re-equipped with 20-pounder field and 40-pounder fort guns in 1889 and on 14 July 1892 they were reorganised as a position battery and six companies:

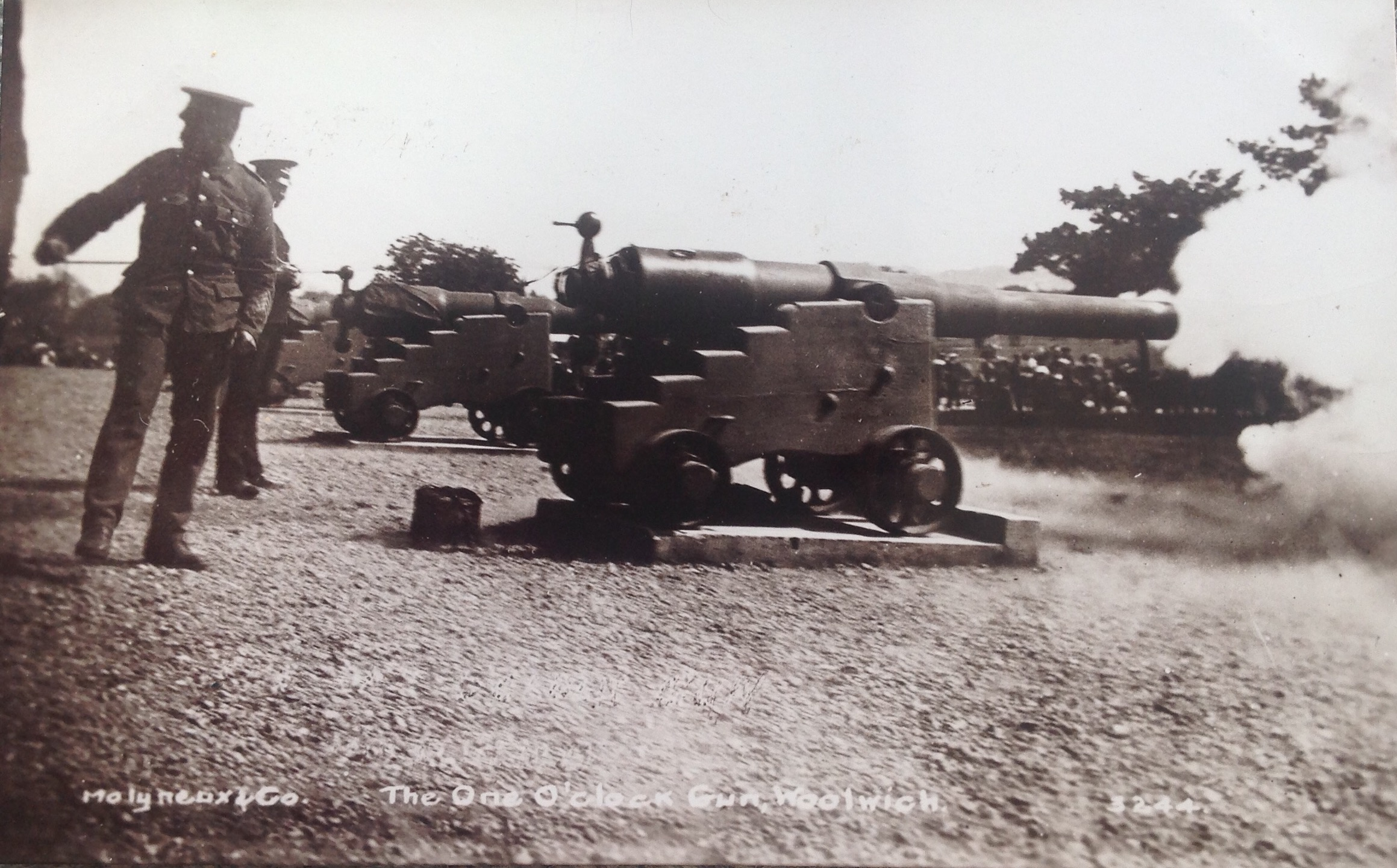
40-pounder gun being fired.

- HQ at Tynemouth
- No 1 Battery at Tynemouth
- Nos 2–4 Companies at Tynemouth
- No 5 Company at Backworth
- No 6 Company at Blyth and Ashington
- No 7 Company at Blyth

In 1893, the batteries at Tynemouth Castle were equipped with modern 6-inch breech-loading guns on hydro-pneumatic disappearing carriages, and the Tynemouth Volunteer Artillery immediately began training to operate them. This was reflected in the War Office Mobilisation Scheme for that year, which allocated the unit to the Tynemouth fixed defences.

On 1 June 1899, the RA was split into Royal Field Artillery and Royal Garrison Artillery (RGA), which was responsible for all coastal and fortress artillery; the Volunteers were affiliated to the RGA. On 1 January 1902, the RA abandoned its divisional organisation and the unit changed its designation to Tynemouth Royal Garrison Artillery (Volunteers).

== Territorial Force ==
When the Volunteers were subsumed into the new Territorial Force (TF) under the Haldane Reforms of 1908, the Tynemouth RGA was intended to combine with the 1st Durham RGA to form a Northumberland and Durham RGA (and spin off a battery and ammunition column for the local RFA brigade). These plans were radically changed, so that by 1910 the Tynemouth and 1st Durham elements had formed their own units. The Tynemouth RGA (TF) was designated as a Defended Ports unit with the following organisation:

- HQ at Military Road, North Shields (Note: The drill hall was demolished in 2000.)
- No 1 Company at North Shields
- No 2 Company at North Shields
- No 3 Company at Prospect Avenue, Seaton Delaval
- No 4 Company at Plessey Road/Quayside, Blyth

The unit formed part of North Eastern Coast Defences, which also included the Regulars of Nos 12 and 47 Companies RGA at Tynemouth. These units were responsible for the manning the following guns in the Tyne defences:

- 2 × 9.2-inch
- 6 × 6-inch

== World War I ==
=== Coast defence ===
On the outbreak of war, the Tynemouth Volunteer Artillery deployed to its war stations in the Tyne Garrison.

Shortly after the outbreak of war on 4 August 1914, TF units were invited to volunteer for Overseas Service, and they began forming Second Line units (distinguished from the original First line by a '2/' prefix). By October 1914, the campaign on the Western Front was bogging down into Trench warfare and there was an urgent need for batteries of siege artillery to be sent to France. The War Office decided that the TF units were well enough trained to take over many of the duties in the coastal defences, releasing Regular RGA gunners for service in the field. Soon the TF RGA companies that had volunteered for overseas service were also supplying trained gunners to RGA units serving overseas and providing cadres to form new units, although complete defended port units never went overseas. Thus the siege batteries formed in late 1915–early 1916 were a mixture of Regular and TF gunners from the RGA coast establishments together with new recruits. 44th Siege Battery formed at Sheerness in 1915 had its cadre provided by the Tynemouth RGA, while a number of others formed at Tynemouth (14 batteries in 1916 alone) may have included men from the Tynemouth RGA among the Regulars and recruits, although the War Office or Army Council Instructions did not specifically order this.

Under Army Council Instruction 686 of April 1917, the coastal defence companies of the RGA (TF) were reorganised. The four serving companies of the Tynemouth RGA (1/1st, 1/2nd/ 1/3rd and 1/4th) were reduced to three (1st, 2nd and 3rd) albeit with a slightly larger establishment of five officers and 100 men, and were to be kept up to strength with Regular recruits.

By early 1918, the companies were serving in No 18 Coastal Fire Command based at Tynemouth. In April 1918, the following guns were in place around the Tyne:

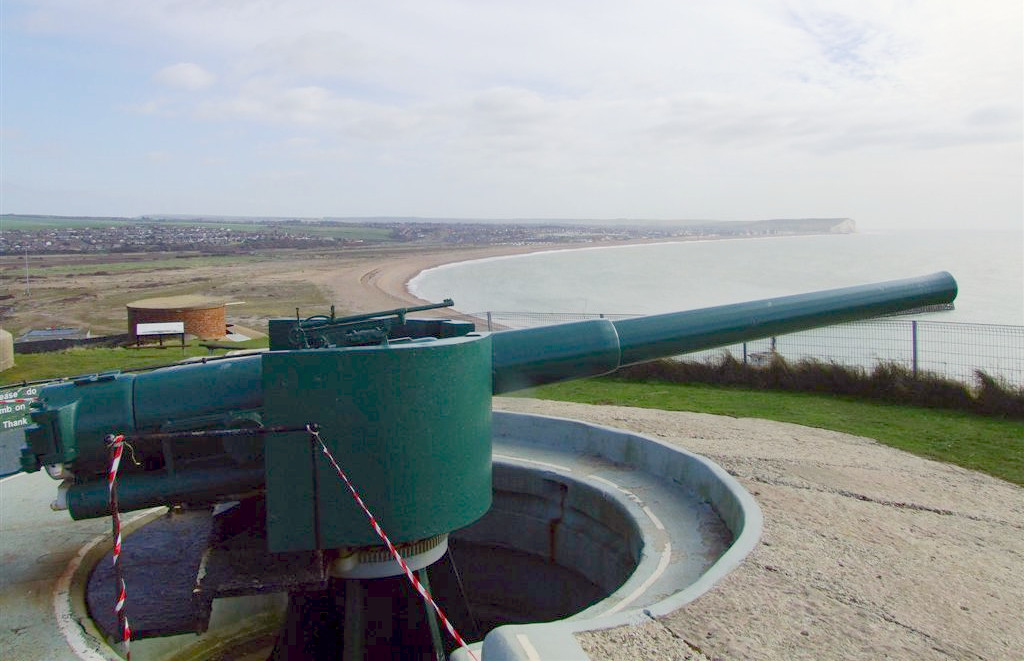
Mk VII 6-inch gun in typical coast defence emplacement, preserved at Newhaven Fort.

Tyne Garrison

  - Sunderland, Roker Battery – 4 × 4.7-inch Quick Fire (QF) guns
- Tyne Defences
  - Kitchener's Battery – 2 × 12-inch guns
  - Frenchman's Point Battery 1 – 1 × 9.2-inch Mk X gun
  - Frenchman's Point Battery 2 – 2 × 6-inch Mk VII guns
  - Spanish Battery – 2 × 6-inch Mk VII
  - Tynemouth Castle Battery 1 – 1 × 9.2-inch Mk X
  - Tynemouth Castle Battery 2 – 2 × 6-inch Mk VII
  - Roberts Battery – 2 × 12-inch
- Blyth Defences
  - Blyth Battery – 2 × 6-inch QF gun

Following the Armistice with Germany the Tynemouth RGA was placed in suspended animation in 1919.

=== 44th Siege Battery, RGA ===
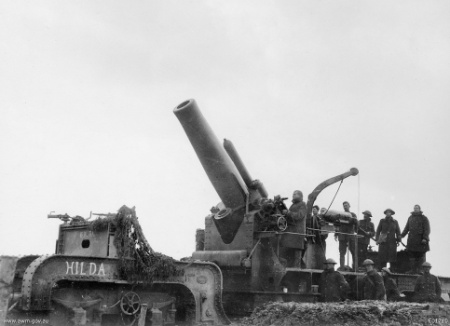
12-inch Railway howitzer on the Western Front, 1917.

The battery was formed on 12 July 1915 at Sheerness from a cadre provided by the Tynemouth RGA and Regular RGA gunners brought back from the defences of Gibraltar and Malta. It went out to the Western Front on 24 January 1916, manning two 12-inch railway howitzers and was involved in the preparatory bombardment for the Battle of the Somme later that year.

The battery remained in action throughout the Somme fighting of 1916. Thereafter, the heavy howitzers were in great demand it was frequently shifted around the railway network behind the Western Front from one army to another. It ended the war attached to Fifth Army supporting the great Allied Hundred Days Offensive.

44th Siege Battery continued in the Regular Army after the Armistice, becoming 16th Medium Battery in 4th Medium Brigade, RGA, in 1920.

== Interwar years ==
=== Tynemouth Heavy Brigade ===
The Tynemouth RGA was reformed on 7 February 1920. When the TF was reconstituted as the Territorial Army (TA) the following year, it was redesignated as the Tynemouth Coast Brigade, becoming the Tynemouth Heavy Brigade in 1924 when the RGA was subsumed into the RA. It had the following organisation:

- Headquarters moved to Blyth in 1934
- 150 Heavy Battery at North Shields – from Nos 1 and 2 Companies
- 151 Heavy Battery at Blyth – from No 4 Company
- 152 Heavy Battery at Seaton Delaval – from No 3 Company

In 1926, it was decided that the coast defences of the UK would be manned by the TA alone.

=== 64th (Northumbrian) Anti-Aircraft Brigade ===
On 1 October 1932, 152 Heavy Battery at Seaton Delaval left to be converted into 152 Medium Battery in 55th (Northumbrian) Medium Brigade. Then, on 1 April 1934, 150 Heavy Battery at North Shields also left to be converted into 150 Medium Battery in 51st (Midland) Medium Brigade. However, on 10 December 1936, these two batteries left their new brigades and were converted again into 179 and 180 (Tynemouth) Anti-Aircraft batteries forming a new 64th (Northumbrian) Anti-Aircraft Brigade based at North Shields. This unit could therefore be considered an indirect offshoot of the Tynemouth Volunteer Artillery. It saw service in World War II during the Battle of Britain and the Newcastle Blitz, North Africa, Italy, Yugoslavia and the occupation of Germany.

== World War II ==
=== Mobilisation ===
The TA was expanded in the years of tension leading up to World War II, and a new 152 Heavy Battery was formed in October 1937. In 1938, the TA replaced its traditional unit designation of 'brigade' with 'regiment', and the unit was redesignated the Tynemouth Heavy Regiment on 1 October. On the outbreak of war, on 3 September, the regiment was responsible for manning one 9.2-inch and four 6-inch guns.

The invasion threat after the Dunkirk evacuation and Fall of France led to a massive increase in Britain's coast defences. In addition to the existing fixed defences, a number of Coast Defence Emergency Batteries were established in May and June 1940, including:

- Seaham (Sunderland) – 2 × 6-inch Mk VII
- Whitburn (Sunderland) – 2 × 6-inch Mk VII
- Park (South Shields) – 2 × 6-inch Mk XII
- Gloucester (Blyth) – 2 × 6-inch Mk XII
- Frenchman's (South Shields) – 2 × 6-inch MkXII

Park, Gloucester and Frenchman's batteries were initially established by the Royal Navy and transferred to the RA when sufficient coastal gunners had been trained.

=== Coast Regiments ===
The expansion of the RA's coast defence branch led to the Tynemouth Heavy Regiment being split into three coast regiments on 14 July 1940:

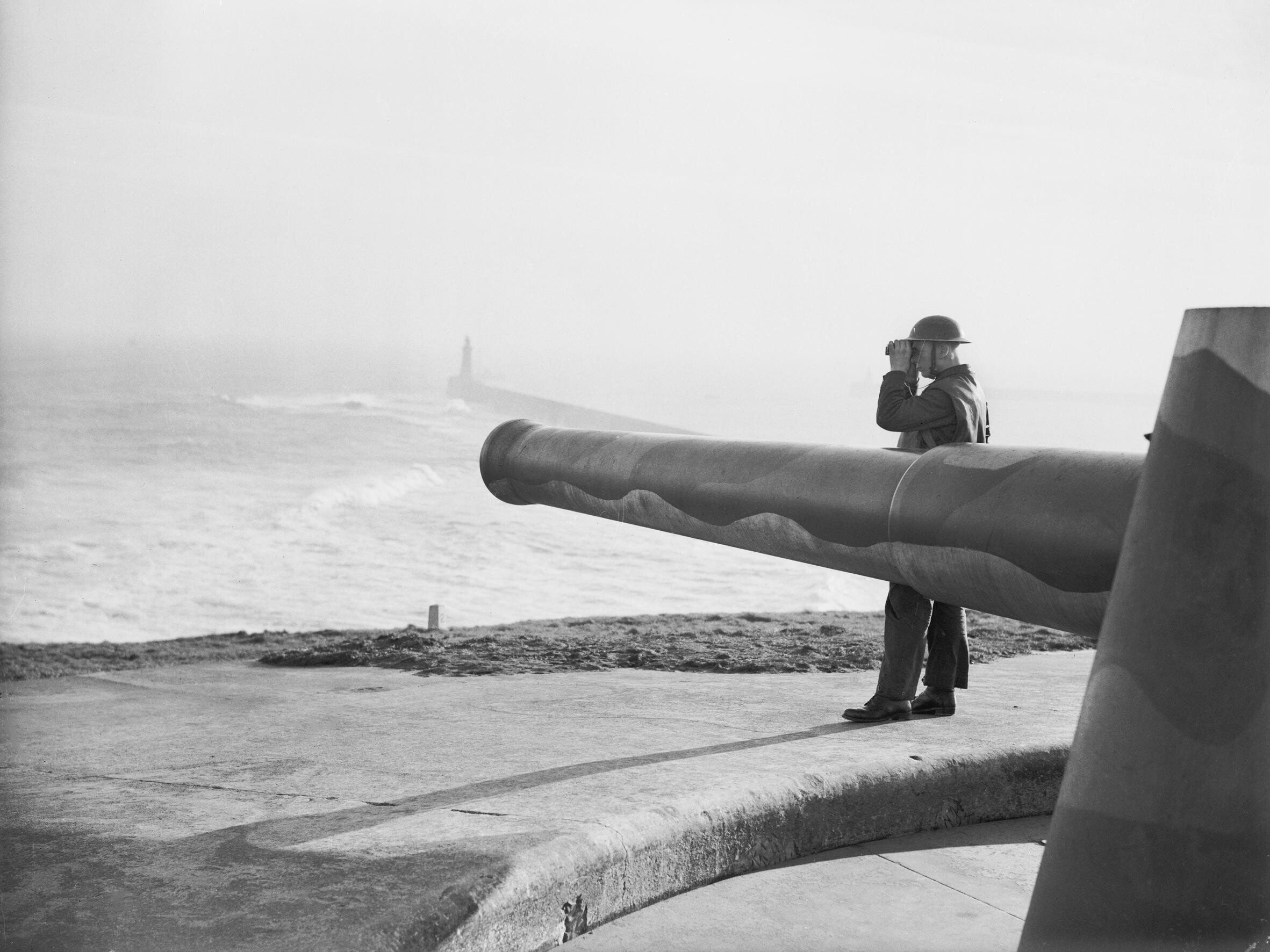
A gunner of 508th (Tynemouth) Coast Regiment keeps watch at the 9.2 inch gun coastal defence battery at Castle Priory, Tynemouth, 28 November 1940 (IWM H5799)

==== 508 (Tynemouth) Coast Regiment ====
Formed with A, B and C Batteries. On 31 December, it was joined by 348 Coast Bty from 554th Coast Rgt at Poole, Dorset. On 1 April 1941, A Bty was split up and the regiment was reorganised as:

- Regimental HQ (RHQ) at Tynemouth Castle in Tynemouth Fire Command
- 259 Coast Bty from A/508 – 9.2-inch guns at Tynemouth Castle
- 260 Coast Bty from A/508 – 6-inch guns at Tynemouth Castle
- 261 Coast Bty from A/508 – 4-inch guns at Tynemouth Castle
- 262 Coast Bty from B/508 – at Spanish Battery
- 263 Coast Bty from C/208 – at Clifford's Fort, North Shields
- 348 Coast Bty – at Frenchman's Battery, South Shields
- 420 Independent Coast Bty joined 10 November 1941 from Needles Battery, Isle of Wight

==== 509 (Tynemouth) Coast Regiment ====
Formed with A and B Batteries. On 31 December, it was joined by 312 and 314 Coast Btys. On 1 April 1941, A and B Btys were numbered:

- RHQ at Sunderland in Sunderland Fire Command
- 264 Coast Bty from A/509 – Roker
- 265 Coast Bty from B/509 – Barrows
- 312 Coast Bty – Whitburn
- 314 Coast Bty – Seaham
- 397 Coast Bty – joined from 511th (Durham) Coast Rgt 30 June 1942

==== 510 (Tynemouth) Coast Regiment ====
Formed with A Bty, joined by 311 (formed at Gloucester Battery) and 313 Coast Btys on 31 December 1940:

- RHQ at Blyth
- 266 Coast Bty from A/510 – Blyth
- 311 Coast Bty – Druridge Bay
- 313 Coast Bty – Tynemouth Castle
- 68 and 70 Coast Observer Detachments (CODs) – joined August 1941
- 310 Coast Bty – joined from 505th (Forth) Coast Rgt 3 November 1941– Spittal
- 19 COD – joined January 1942, replaced by 97 COD by end of year
- 20 and 22 Mobile Defence Troops – attached to 311 Coast Bty January 1942
- 80 COD – joined April 1942
- 322 Coast Bty – joined from 565th Coast Rgt at Hunstanton, Norfolk, 15 May 1942

=== Mid-war ===
At their height, in September 1941, the Tyne defences contained the following guns:

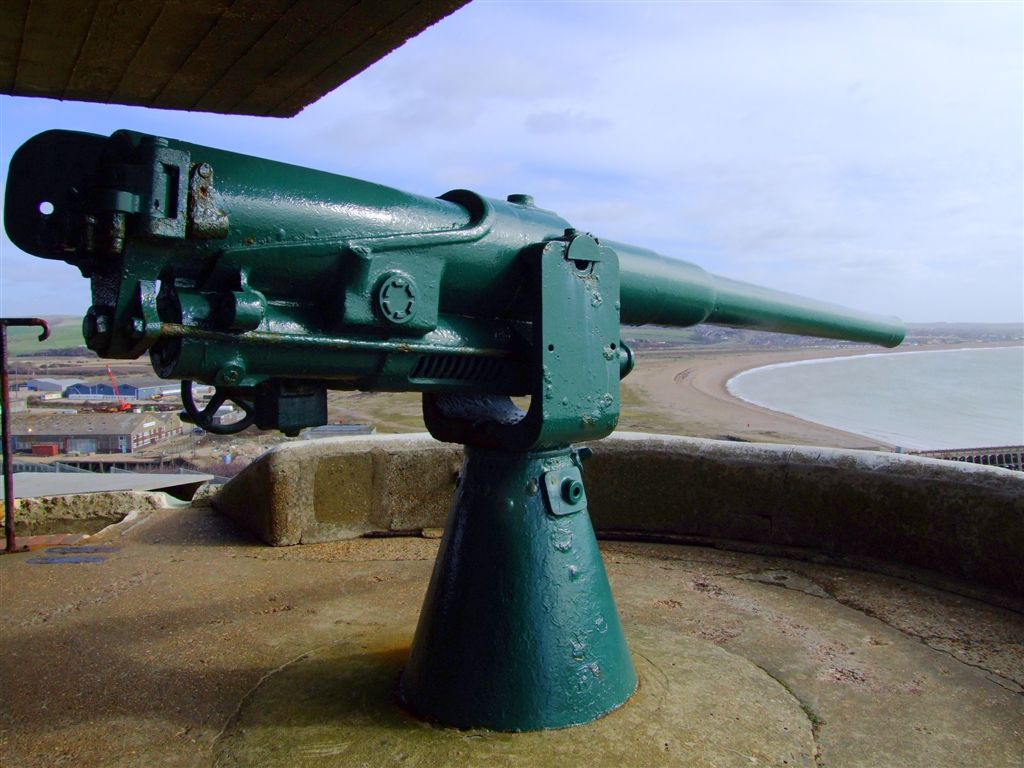
12-pounder gun in typical coast defence mounting at Newhaven Fort.

- Blyth
  - 4 × 6-inch
- Tyne
  - 1 × 9.2-inch
  - 6 × 6-inch
  - 1 × 4-inch
  - 2 × 12-pounders
- South Shields
  - 2 × 6-inch
- Sunderland
  - 4 × 6-inch
  - 2 × 12-pounders
- Seaham
  - 2 × 6-inch

All three regiments came under the command of IX Corps HQ by May 1942. By then, the threat from German attack had diminished and there was demand for trained gunners for the fighting fronts. A process of reducing the manpower in the coast defences began. 265/509 Coast Bty was placed in suspended animation on 20 June, just before 397 Bty arrived, and 261/508 Coast Bty was disbanded 10–17 October. 322/510 Coast Bty went to War Office Control on 7 May 1943, but was replaced by 444 Coast Bty, newly formed at Gloucester Battery. 420/508 Coast Bty was disbanded on 20 September 1943. IX Corps HQ left for North Africa (Operation Torch) and was replaced by Corps Coast Artillery HQ, Northumbrian District, by the end of 1942.

The manpower requirements for the forthcoming Allied invasion of Normandy (Operation Overlord) led to further reductions in coast defences in April 1944. 509th Coast Rgt was placed in suspended animation on 1 April 1944 and its remaining batteries (264, 312, 314, 397) were regimented with 508th Coast Rgt. 70 Coast Observer Detachment was also disbanded in April 1944.

=== Late war ===
As the campaign in North West Europe progressed after D Day, the manpower demands of 21st Army Group led to further reductions in coastal artillery. By this stage of the war, many of the coast battery positions were manned by Home Guard detachments or in the hands of care and maintenance parties. On 18 October 1944, 510th Coast Rgt was placed in suspended animation and its units (264, 312, 314, 397 Coast Btys, 68 COD) were transferred to 508th Coast Rgt, and the positions manned by 259, 260, 262, 263 and 444 Coast Btys were placed under care and maintenance.

==== 616 (Tynemouth) Regiment ====
Then, in January 1945, the War Office began to reorganise surplus anti-aircraft and coastal artillery regiments in the UK into infantry battalions, primarily for line of communication and occupation duties in North West Europe, thereby releasing trained infantry for frontline service. On 15 January 1945, all the remaining Tyne batteries were transferred to the command of 526th (Durham) Coast Rgt, while RHQ 508th Coast Rgt and Tynemouth Fire Control HQ were converted into 616 (Tynemouth) Regiment, RA.

After infantry training in Scotland with 301st Infantry Brigade, the brigade transferred to 21st Army Group on 9 May 1945, and landed on the Continent on 15 May (a week after VE Day), where it came under the command of First Canadian Army.

The regiment was placed in suspended animation on 31 October 1945, completing the process on 24 November.

== Postwar ==
When the TA was reconstituted on 1 January 1947, 508 and 509 Coast Rgts were reformed as 404/405 (Tynemouth) Coast Regiment in 103 Coast Brigade, while 510 was formally disbanded. 404 and 405 Regiments, based at North Shields and Blyth respectively, had recruited sufficiently to become separate units by September 1948, but as it had been decided to reduce the number of TA coast regiments, 405 Coast Rgt was converted into 405 (Tynemouth) Heavy Anti-Aircraft Regiment that year. On 1 January 1954, 405 HAA Rgt absorbed 464 (Northumbrian) HAA Rgt (the successor of 64th (Northumbrian) HAA Rgt formed in 1936, see above) providing RHQ, P and Q Btys.

When Anti-Aircraft Command was abolished and the number of AA units reduced on 10 March 1955, 405 (Tynemouth) HAA Rgt was amalgamated into 324 (Northumbrian) HAA Regiment (successor to the 1st Northumberland Artillery Volunteers from which the Tynemouth had separated in 1884 see above). The RA's Coast Artillery branch was also abolished the following year, and 404 (Tynemouth) Coast Rgt amalgamated into 439 Light AA Regiment (the old Tyne Electrical Engineers) at Tynemouth on 30 October 1956, forming P (Tynemouth) Battery. The regiment became 439 (Tyne) Light Air Defence Regiment in 1964.

When the TA was reduced into the Territorial and Army Volunteer Reserve in 1967, 439 (Tyne) LAD Rgt became the HQ Battery of the amalgamated 101 (Northumberland) Regiment RA (V), the battery regaining its subtitle 'Tynemouth Volunteer Artillery' in 1993. In July 2006, the battery was disbanded, but the name was perpetuated in the Radar (Tynemouth Volunteer Artillery) Troop, of 204 Battery, RA (V).

== Uniforms and insignia ==
The original uniform of the Tynemouth Artillery Volunteers was the same as the Rifle Volunteers of the area: a silver-grey tunic with black braid and scarlet facings, grey trousers with black stripes, and black belts with bronze ornaments for other ranks, silver for officers wore. The headdress was a grey Shako with scarlet plume. The artillery wore a gun badge on the shako and pouch in place of the riflemen's bugle. This uniform only lasted a short while before Royal Artillery blue was adopted.

When the Home Service helmet was adopted, the upper scroll on the helmet plate read 'THE TYNEMOUTH' and the lower read 'TYNEMOUTH ARTILLERY VOLUNTEERS' with the RA motto 'QUO FAS ET GLORIA DUCUNT' with the royal crown. The unit wore brass shoulder titles with the lettering in three tiers: 'THE/RA/TYNEMOUTH'.

From 1952, 404 (Tynemouth) Coast Regiment wore the word 'TYNEMOUTH' inserted beneath the 'ROYAL ARTILLERY' on their red-on-blue shoulder badge.

== Honorary Colonels ==
The following served as Honorary Colonel of the unit.

- Algernon Percy, 6th Duke of Northumberland, former captain, Grenadier Guards, appointed 30 December 1861 and continued in this role with the 1st Admin Brigade (his younger brother, Lt-Gen Lord Henry Percy, VC, succeeded their father as Hon Col of the Percy Artillery)
- R.S. Donkin, appointed 23 January 1886
- Col W.F. Pilter, CB, VD, former commanding officer (CO), appointed 16 February 1901
- Sir Francis Blake, 1st Baronet, of Tillmouth Park, CB, former CO of the Northumberland RGA Militia, appointed 15 May 1925
- Col C.E. Vickery, CMG, DSO, appointed 20 July 1936

== See also ==
- Militia and Volunteers of Northumberland
