= 5th Battalion, Lincolnshire Regiment =

5th Battalion, Lincolnshire Regiment 46th Searchlight Regiment, RA 606 Infantry Regiment, RA 581 Heavy AA Regiment, RA
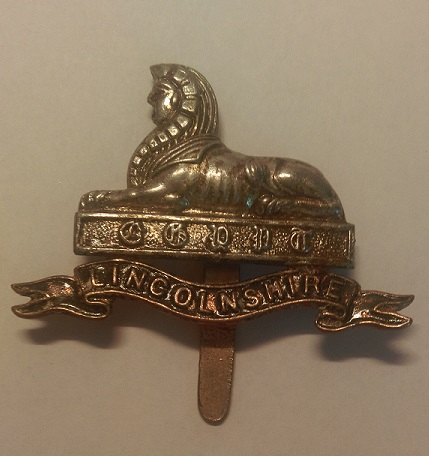
- Lincolnshire Regiment Cap Badge
- Active: 1 April 1908 – 10 March 1955
- Country: United Kingdom
- Branch: Territorial Army
- Role: Infantry (1908–1936, 1944–1945); Air Defence (1936–1944, 1947–1967)
- Garrison/HQ: Grimsby
- Engagements: WWI: Hohenzollern Redoubt; Gommecourt; Hill 70; 3rd Ypres; Bourlon Wood; German spring offensive St Quentin Canal; German spring offensive Bailleul; WWII: Newcastle Blitz; North West Europe

The 5th Battalion, Lincolnshire Regiment (5th Lincolns), was a volunteer unit of Britain's Territorial Army from 1900 until 1967, serving as infantry on the Western Front during the First World War and as an air defence unit during and after the Second World War.

== Volunteer Origins ==
The unit's predecessor, the 3rd Volunteer Battalion, Lincolnshire Regiment, had been formed in June 1900 by detaching six companies from the regiment's 1st Volunteer Battalion. These companies were based in the north and east of Lincolnshire, and battalion headquarters was established at Grimsby. Prior to their consolidation into the 1st Volunteer Battalion in 1880, these companies had been separate Rifle Volunteer Corps (RVCs) raised during the first enthusiasm for the Volunteer movement (dates of formation are those of the first officers' commissions):

- A & B Companies, formerly 6th (Grimsby Rifles) Lincolnshire RVC (20 March 1860), based at the Infantry Drill Hall, Doughty Road, Grimsby
- C Company, formerly 7th (Spilsby) Lincolnshire RVC (17 March 1860), based at the Drill Hall, Hatton Road, Spilsby
- D Company, formerly 2nd (Louth Rifles) Lincolnshire RVC (21 November 1859), based at the Drill Hall, Northgate, Louth
- E Company, formerly 12th (Barton) Lincolnshire RVC (12 January 1860), based at the Drill Hall, Butts Road, Barton-upon-Humber
- F Company, formerly 11th (Alford) Lincolnshire RVC (23 February 1860), based at the Drill Hall, Corn Exchange, Alford
- G & H Companies, formerly 20th (Market Rasen) Lincolnshire RVC (16 July 1860, previously based at Frodingham); in 1900 based at the Drill Hall, Home Street Scunthorpe with a half company at Brigg.

The Grimsby recruits were chiefly drawn from men employed in the fishing industry and docks; the Frodingham and Scunthorpe men came from the iron ore and smelting industries; Louth, Spilsby, Alford and Brigg were agricultural areas, while most of the Gainsborough men were drawn from the Marshall, Sons & Co. agricultural engineering works and the Barton men from the Elswick Hopper cycle works.

The volunteer battalions of the Lincolnshire Regiment formed part of the North Midland Brigade of the Volunteer Force, but with so many of its companies situated along the south shore of the Humber Estuary, the 3rd Volunteer Bn was attached to the Humber Brigade for training.

== Territorial Force ==
When the Volunteers were subsumed into the Territorial Force (TF) under the Haldane Reforms in 1908, the 3rd Volunteer Bn was converted into the 5th Battalion Lincolnshire Regiment, joined by E and F Companies (formerly 19th (Gainsborough) Lincolnshire RVC, raised 10 July 1860) from the 1st Volunteer Bn, which became the new H Company, based at the Drill Hall in Spital Terrace in Gainsborough. (The remainder of the 1st and the 2nd Volunteer Bns together formed the 4th Bn Lincolns). The first commanding officer (CO) of the 5th Bn was Lt-Col George Beaumont Walker.

The two TF battalions of the Lincolns, together with those of the Leicestershire Regiment formed the Lincolnshire & Leicestershire Brigade of the North Midland Division.

== First World War ==
=== Mobilisation ===
On 25 July 1914 the two Lincolnshire TF battalions assembled at Bridlington for their annual camp, being joined on 2 August by the Leicestershire battalions to make a full brigade camp. However, with the international situation deteriorating, the units returned to their homes on 3 August and on the evening of 4 August the orders for mobilisation were issued. By the afternoon of 6 August the whole battalion was concentrated at the Infantry Drill Hall, Grimsby, and billeted in schools in the town.

The battalion's first duties were to guard Grimsby docks and harbour, the electric power station and wireless station, and to dig trenches by the mouth of the Humber at Cleethorpes. However, by 11 August the 5th Lincolns was able to hand these over to the Special Reserve battalions of the Manchester Regiment and proceed to the brigade's war station at Belper. It then entrained in 15 August for Luton, where the North Midland Division went into training.

The 5th Lincolns was considerably below its establishment strength in the summer of 1914, recruitment among agricultural workers being especially difficult. At Belper the men were invited to volunteer for active service overseas. At first the response was half-hearted, but by the end of August at Luton the numbers reached 650 and the battalion was accepted for foreign service, as was the whole division. The men who had not volunteered became the nucleus of a reserve battalion nearby at Dunstable. Later the Foreign Service and Reserve battalions were numbered 1/5th and 2/5th respectively. Both were brought up to full strength by recruits, and the 2/5th joined a new 2nd North Midland Division in January 1915. A new Reserve or 3/5th Bn was raised in April 1915 to train drafts for the 1st and 2nd Lines.

On 1 September 1914, 52 former pupils of Wintringham School, Grimsby, formed a company based at the armoury of the school's Officer Training Corps. The company was offered to the 5th Lincolns, but by then the battalion was full. The volunteer company then became the nucleus of a complete battalion of Kitchener's Army formed by the Borough of Grimsby known as the Grimsby Chums, later the 10th (Service) Bn, Lincolnshire Regiment.

=== 1/5th Battalion ===
==== Ypres Salient ====
The 1/5th Lincolns landed at Le Havre on 1 March 1915 and by 8 March the North Midland Division had completed its concentration – the first complete TF formation to arrive on the Western Front. It was numbered the 46th (North Midland) Division in May, when the Lincolnshire & Leicestershire Brigade was numbered 138th (Lincoln and Leicester) Brigade. However, on arrival at Ploegsteert in the Ypres Salient, the two Lincolnshire battalions were attached to the Regulars of 11th Brigade in 4th Division for instruction in trench duties. They went into the line for the first time on 9 April opposite Spanbroekmolen. The battalion's first task was to keep the German trenches under fire on 17 April to assist an attack on Hill 60. On 20 May the Germans exploded a mine under 1/5th Bn's trenches, killing 11 men (and four missing, believed killed) and wounding 22. On 6 June the Royal Engineers detected and destroyed another mine beneath the battalion before the Germans could blow it.

The battalion was not involved in the 46th Division's first action (the German flamethrower attack at Hooge on 30–31 July 1915), but was under heavy shellfire during this period, and was mined again on 26 September, suffering numerous casualties.

==== Hohenzollern Redoubt ====
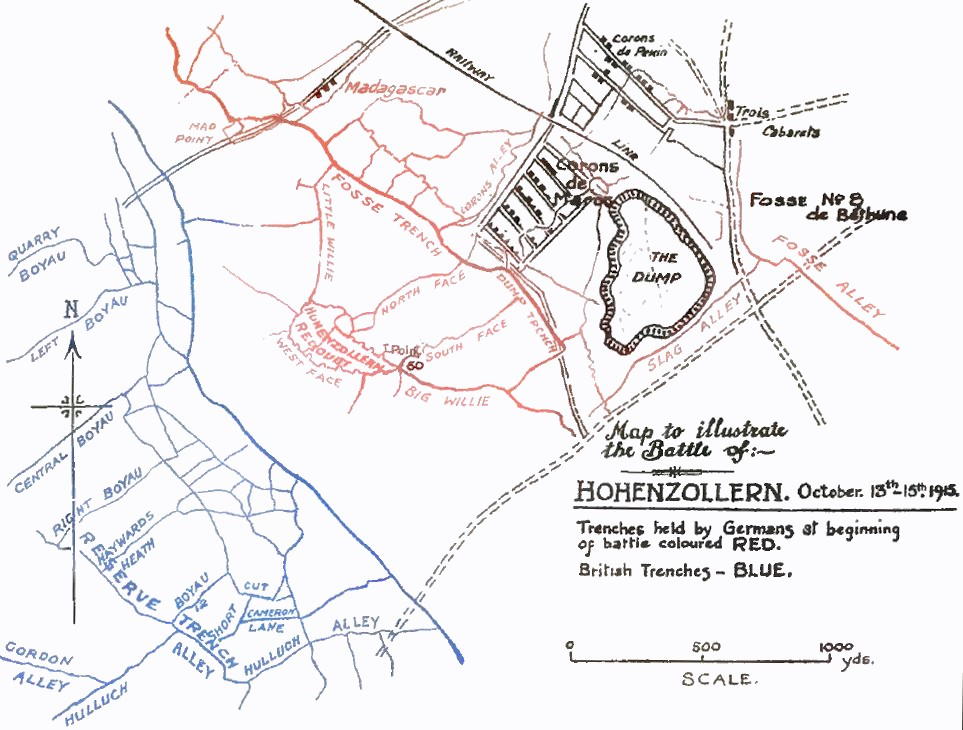
The Hohenzollern Redoubt, 1915

The 1/5th Bn was in the forefront of the attack on the Hohenzollern Redoubt in October 1915. This was an attempt to restart the failed Battle of Loos, and the division was moved down from Ypres on 1 October for the purpose. The Germans had recaptured the Hohenzollern Redoubt on 1 October after severe fighting, and had driven off a hastily organised British attack. 46th (North Midland) Division was ordered to make a prepared attack on 13 October.

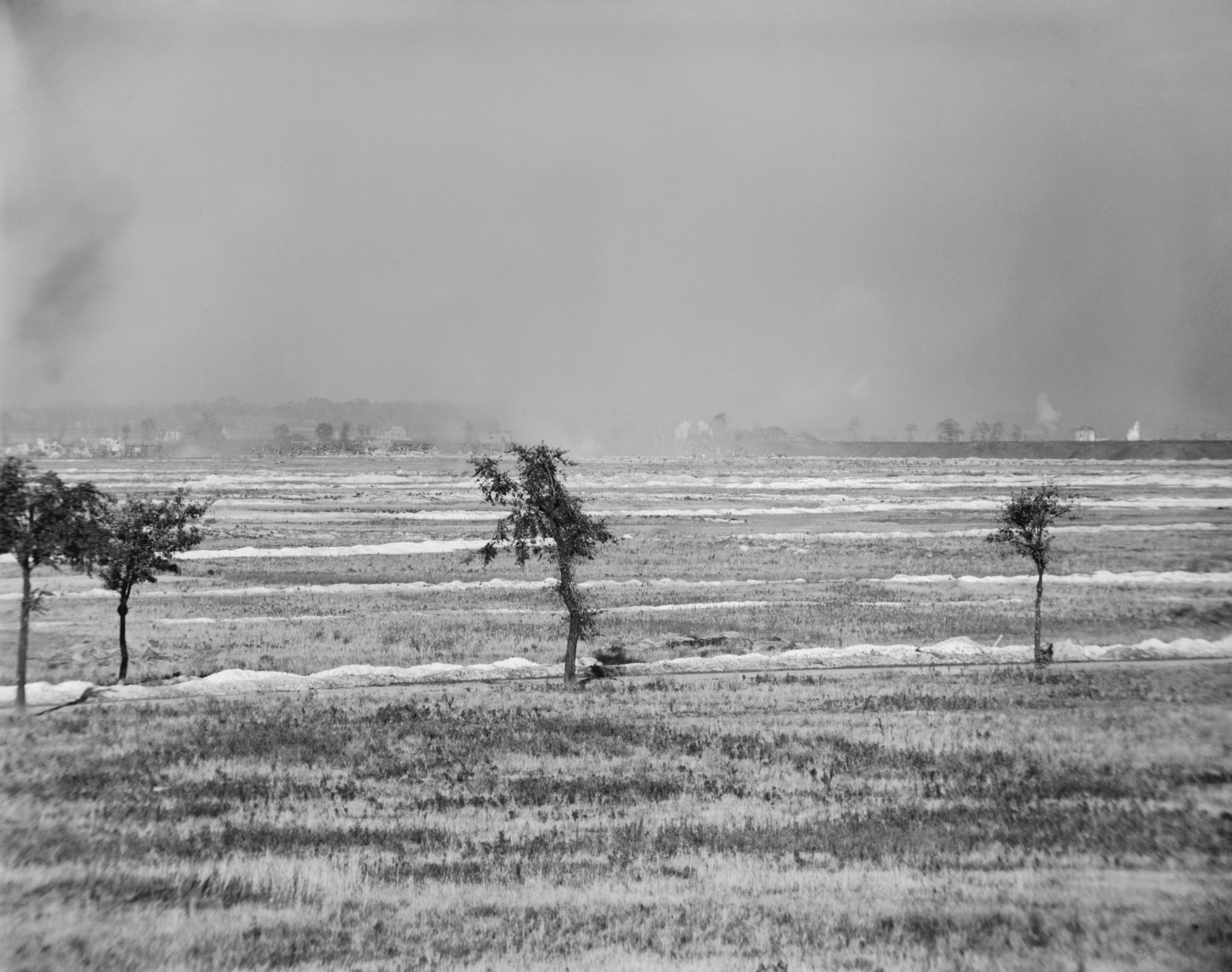
46th (North Midland) Division attacking the Hohenzollern Redoubt, 13 October 1915; a cloud of smoke and gas appears in the centre and left

The battalion took over its place in the line on the night of 12/13 October. The preliminary bombardment began at noon on 13 October, a gas cloud was discharged from the British trenches at 13.45, and the troops went over the top at 14.00. 1/5th Lincolns formed the left half of 138th Bde's attack, advancing in four waves, the first two platoons of each company jumping off from the front line, the other two from the support line. The battalion's objective was Fosse Trench, about 400 yards behind the Hohenzollern Redoubt. The barbed wire in front of the redoubt was well cut and the leading waves of the battalion swept over its east and west faces with little difficulty until they reached the dead ground between the redoubt and Fosse Trench, which was open and swept by rifle and machine gun fire from the front and both flanks, particularly from Mad Point out to the left. The attack melted away, although isolated parties maintained themselves in shell holes, including Sergeant Harry Drewery with the only surviving machine gun team, who set up in a German communication trench and stayed in action until evening. (Drewery was awarded the DCM and his gunner, Private Percy Coulson the MM.) The CO, Lt-Col T.E. Sandall, was among the wounded. At dusk the battalion's survivors under the only unwounded officer, Captain R.E. Madge, withdrew to the redoubt, which the support battalion (1/4th Lincolns) and the divisional pioneers (1st Bn Monmouthshire Regiment) were consolidating for defence. The Germans put down a heavy bombardment on the east face, obliterating the defences, and the survivors had to retreat to the west face, which they held throughout the night until relieved next morning. (Corporal C. Leadbeater won a bar to his previous DCM for consolidating a point in the north face, defending it with Hand grenades through the night, and then acting as a stretcher bearer when the battalion withdrew; several other MMs were slo awarded.) The battalion had lost 22 out of 23 officers in action, and 461 other ranks, killed and wounded.

After the disaster, the 46th Division undertook trench-holding duties and absorbed drafts of reinforcements until 23 December, when it was ordered to Egypt. The 1/5th Lincolns entrained for Marseille and embarked on the troopship HMT Anchises on 8 January 1916, reaching Alexandria on 13 January. However, the movement was immediately cancelled, and the troops disembarked next day and went into camp. However, the division's move to Egypt was countermanded on 21 January and the units that had arrived were re-embarked. The 1/5th Lincolns boarded HMT Megantic at Alexandria on 2 February to return to France on 5 February. The battalion landed on 9 February and the division had reassembled near Amiens by 14 February. The 46th Division went back into the line in the Vimy sector, where 1/5th Bn was involved in a sharp fight when the Germans blew a mine under the parapet of their trench on 12 March.

The battalion had been badly hit by sickness and was at less than half its establishment strength, and so was primarily used for fatigue duties. In April it received a strong draft from home, enabling it to take its place in the line, and Lt-Col Sandall returned to resume command.

==== Gommecourt ====
In May the division moved south to take part in the forthcoming offensive on the Somme. It was ordered to assault the north side of the Gommecourt Salient on 1 July 1916. The operation, in conjunction with the 56th (1st London) Division attacking from the south, aimed at cutting off the salient, but was in fact a diversion for the main attack a few miles south that opened the Battle of the Somme. Training for the assault was carried out in Lucheux Forest during May, and in the weeks before the attack the battalion was engaged in fatigue duties, trench-digging, and taking turns in the front line, suffering a trickle of casualties.

When the attack went in on 1 July, 138th Bde was in reserve; however, the assault by 137th (Staffordshire) and 139th (Sherwood Foresters) Bdes was a failure. At 08.30, the 1/5th Lincolns moved up cross-country in 'Artillery Formation' and took up positions in Midland Trench, the attacking brigades' original assembly position. It remained there for 12 hours under artillery fire, losing 10 men killed and one wounded. At 20.30 it was ordered to send forward patrols to try to get in touch with any of the Sherwood Foresters who might be holding out in the German frontline trenches, and then at 21.00 it was ordered to make an attack to seize those trenches at midnight. The battalion struggled up through choked communication trenches through Foncquevillers to relieve 139th Bde. The situation was chaotic and Sergeant Hamp, acting commander of a platoon, refused to advance without clear orders (he was not punished, and was subsequently promoted). The advance into No man's land in the dark found the German wire uncut and none of 137th or 139th Bde in the enemy lines. The battalion was eventually ordered to retire, bringing back wounded from No man's land. The abortive movement had cost a further 48 casualties.

The battalion spent the following days clearing up the front line, with several men winning gallantry medals for their work in bringing in casualties from No man's land. It was relieved on 11 July.

Through the summer of 1916 and the subsequent winter the battalion took its turn in holding trenches at Foncquevillers and Berles-au-Bois. On 18 October, A Company launched a successful trench raid, supported by artillery, into the enemy lines.

Early 1917 saw the 46th Division still holding the line in the same area. However, at the beginning of March, patrols found that the Germans were beginning to retreat from the Gommecourt defences. The division followed up as the enemy retreated as far as their new Hindenburg Line defences well beyond the Somme battlefields. 46th Division was withdrawn from the pursuit on 17 March. It spent some time clearing the battlefield of 1 July 1916 and burying the dead who had been lying in No man's land for almost 10 months.

==== Lens and Hill 70 ====
In April 1917 the division moved to the Lens area and became involved in 10 weeks' bloody fighting round Hill 70. On 23 April, patrols of the battalion had the unaccustomed experience of street fighting while supporting an attack by 139th Bde on Hill 65. Until the battalion was relieved on 6 May, casualties were suffered from shelling and raiding, and several men were decorated for their actions in the confused fighting. 1/5th Lincolns took further turns in the line, with active patrolling and raiding, and full battalion attacks on 19 June (costing 74 casualties) and 30 June (51 casualties in taking Cité de Moulin). The division handed over to the 2nd Canadian Division in early July, having secured the jumping-off positions from which the Canadian Corps launched the successful Battle of Hill 70 in August.

46th (North Midland) Division was not used offensively again until September 1918, spending its time in tours of duty holding the front line in quiet sectors. When 2/5th Lincolns was disbanded on 31 July 1918 (see below), the 1/5th Bn absorbed the remnants, reverting to the title of 5th Lincolns.

==== St Quentin Canal ====
The division was given the most difficult task in the Battle of the St. Quentin Canal on 29 September 1918: it had to cross the canal itself, where it constituted part of the Hindenburg Line. The crossing was to be made by 137th (Staffordshire) Bde, with 138th (Lincoln & Leicester) Bde following up and then attacking towards the second objective. Zero hour was at 05.50, when the Staffordshires moved out behind a creeping barrage, quickly captured the German front line trenches, crossed the canal, and consolidated on the first objective (the 'Red Line') under the protection of a standing barrage. The other two brigades then crossed the canal, and when the barrage began to roll forward again at 11.20, the 5th Lincolns followed with support from four tanks of 9th Bn Tank Corps, gaining its objective of Magny-la-Fosse and the high ground beyond at 12.30. It made contact with 139th Bde on the right and with the 30th US Division and 5th Australian Division on the left. The 1/5th Leicesters passed through to take the final objective at 13.50. The 5th Lincolns had taken large numbers of prisoners at small cost to itself (5 killed and 56 wounded).

==== Ramicourt ====
The 46th Division went into action again on 3 October at Ramicourt, where it penetrated the German Beaurevoir Line. C and D Companies of the battalion were sent up from reserve to repel a German counter-attack, but the furthest positions at Montbrehain and the summit of 'Mannequin Hill' could not be held. There were several casualties from shellfire and the brigade spent the night under attack by German aircraft using parachute flares.

==== Andigny ====
The Battle of Andigny on 17 October (part of the Battle of the Selle) was 46th Division's last general action of the war. 138th and 139th Brigades advanced through 6th Division and followed the barrage towards the objective. Direction keeping in the morning mist was difficult, and German machine gunners resisted fiercely, but 138th Bde overran the enemy's wire and trenches and 5th Bn was on its intermediate line by 08.00. However, it was slightly to the right of the objective, so that Andigny les Fermes on the left remained untaken. However, pressure from elsewhere led the Germans to evacuate the village by 15.30, and a line of platoon strongpoints and outposts was established.

After a few days' rest, the division joined the pursuit of the retreating enemy (the Battle of the Sambre). At the Petit Helpe river on the night of 6/7 November, 5th Lincolns found the bridges washed away, and A Company improvised a crossing by throwing carts, planks and ladders across the stream, while civilians from the other bank did the same. The other companies had to fell trees and took longer to get over, but the battalion was across and formed up for its advance by 08.00, meeting little opposition. The Armistice came into force on 11 November.

The battalion was stationed at Bousies until February 1919, engaged in salvage work. demobilisation began on 1 February, and parties departed for home daily from then on. In April parties were transferred to Prisoner of war escort companies and the battalion was reduced to a cadre at Inchy. The cadre left France on 24 June and paraded in Grimsby on 29 June when it deposited the battalion's colours in the parish church. The battalion was formally disembodied on 2 July 1919

==== Commanding officers ====
The following officers commanded 5th and 1/5th Bns during the war:

- Lt-Col T.E. Sandall, CMG, 11 May 1912 – 13 October 1915 (wounded); 6 April 1916 – 2 May 1917
- Lt-Col P.T. Westmorland (Royal Warwickshire Regiment), 7 November 1915 – 30 April 1916
- Lt-Col H.A. Waring, DSO, (Royal West Kent Regiment), 8 May 1917 – 30 June 1918.
- Lt-Col H.G. Wilson, DSO, (former 2nd-in-command) 30 June 1918 – 29 June 1919.

=== 2/5th Battalion ===
The 2nd Line battalion was formed on 16 February 1915 at Grimsby from men who had not volunteered for overseas service, together with the many new recruits under training. Mirroring its 1st Line parent, the battalion formed part of 2nd Lincoln & Leicester Brigade in 2nd North Midland Division; these were later numbered 177th (2/1st Lincoln and Leicester) Brigade and 59th (2nd North Midland) Division respectively. Training was carried out at Luton and later St Albans. There was a shortage of weapons and equipment. Eventually, the men were issued with .256-in Japanese Ariska rifles with which to train. These were not replaced with Lee-Enfield rifles until September 1915. When the 59th Division began training for overseas service, the Home Service details of 2/5th Lincolns and other battalions of the 2nd Lincoln & Leicester Brigade went to the 28th Provisional Battalion, later the 13th Bn Lincolnshire Regiment, a home defence unit (see below).

==== Ireland ====
In the Spring of 1916 the 59th Division was the designated 'mobile division' in Home Forces, intended to repel German invasion of the East Coast, but on Easter Monday, 24 April, it was sent at a few hours' notice to Dublin to help quell the Easter Rising – the first TF units to serve in Ireland. 177th (Lincoln and Leicester) Brigade went with Divisional HQ to Kingstown (Dún Laoghaire), where they landed on 28 April. The only serious fighting in Dublin fell to 178th (Sherwood Foresters) Brigade and in May 177th Bde was sent to Fermoy.

The division remained in garrison in Ireland until the end of the year. With its units spread out in small garrisons, collective training was hindered. 59th Division returned to England in January 1917 and began final battle training at Fovant, where there was a large purpose-built camp on the edge of the Salisbury Plain training area. However, it never trained as a division, and when it was inspected before embarkation for active service, it was reported as being only partially trained. Nevertheless, it began moving to France in February.

==== Hindenburg Line ====
59th Division was fully concentrated around Méricourt near Amiens by 3 March. On the night of 13 March the 2/5th Lincolns had taken their place in the line, occupying a group of dug-outs in Triangle Wood, but the Germans began a planned retreat to the Hindenburg Line on 17 March, and the poorly trained 59th had to follow up, patrolling and repairing roads. On 11 April the 2/5th Bn was ordered to make an immediate attack on 'The Quarry' and 'Cologne Farm' near Hargicourt, which the enemy were reported to be leaving. The attack was made at 04.30, but the report was false and the positions were strongly held. The battalion was forced back with very heavy casualties (260 killed, wounded and missing). A and C Companies, which had led the attack and suffered worst, had to be temporarily formed into a single composite company.

There followed some weeks of trench duty in front of the Hindenburg Line, followed by intense training through the summer.

==== Polygon Wood ====
In September the division moved to the Ypres Salient to take part in its first full-scale action, the 3rd Ypres Offensive. The 59th relieved the 55th (West Lancashire) Division after its successful attack at the Battle of the Menin Road Ridge, and then took the lead in the next phase, the Battle of Polygon Wood (26 September). This was equally successful, with the Leicester battalions of 177th Bde advancing behind the smoke and dust of a creeping barrage and gaining their first objective without much opposition. The two Lincolnshire battalions then passed through to take the second objective, 2/5th Lincolns attacking with B company on the right, D on the left, C in support and A in reserve providing carrying parties. D Company met practically no resistance and dug a strongpoint north of 'Dochy Farm'. B Company attacked the farm, meeting machine gun and rifle fire, but worked round the flanks of the pillboxes with the help of a platoon from B Company, whereupon some 50 Germans surrendered to them. The battalion then consolidated a line of strongpoints, and deepened and connected a line of shell holes in rear of the strongpoints. German shellfire caused only a few casualties and the battalion was relieved that night. Although the attack had been a complete success, the battalion still suffered 16 killed, 210 wounded and 74 missing; of 584 officers and men who went into action, only 285 marched out.

==== Bourlon Wood ====
59th Division was next moved south to join in the Battle of Cambrai. The division relieved the Guards Division on 28 November and the 2/5th Bn entered the recently captured Hindenburg Support Line near Flesquières, losing a number of officers when a dugout was destroyed by shellfire. The 2/5th Bn was unaffected by the fierce German counter-attack on 30 November, and continued to dig in. But on 2 December it moved into the forward trenches in the south east corner of Bourlon Wood. Apart from heavy gas shelling this position was not attacked. However, by 4 December the decision had been made to withdraw from the dangerous Bourlon Salient, and 59th Division withdrew to the Flesquières Ridge, the 2/5th Bn retiring by platoons without the enemy noticing. On 7 December the British were back on the line that they would hold for the coming winter.

==== German Spring Offensive ====
The German spring offensive opened on 21 March while the division was in the Bullecourt sector of the line with 177th Bde in reserve. The brigade was ordered to advance across country in artillery formation to take up its allotted positions in the support line. At noon the 2/5th Lincolns was ordered to occupy the second line trenches, but found that the enemy had overrun the Sherwood Foresters in the morning mist and was already in the second line. Before the battalion could extend its line, three companies were cut off at Noreuil and were never seen again: 49 men were killed and all the rest were captured. The remaining company withdrew and took up positions in the partially-dug third line.

Despite its losses, 177th Bde remained in action on 22 and 23 March under the command of 40th Division. 2/5th Lincolns consisted of just 5 officers and about 80 other ranks. It held positions north west of Vraucourt until forced to retire to the Army Line at 16.00 on 22 March, and then again to Mory at 20.00. On 23 March the brigade had to withdraw over 5-600 yards of open ground under intense machine-gun fire, losing more men, before digging in, when they were relieved by 40th Division. During the battle the 2/5th Bn's casualties had amounted to about 510 all ranks.

The battalion was made up to four companies with drafts, but most of these were not Midlanders, and there was no time to integrate them. The 59th Division now went to the Ypres sector. On 15 April the battalion was called forward to hold positions on the Ravetsberg Ridge. Each company had a platoon in an advanced post on the forward slope while the remaining platoons dug in on the reverse slope. At 06.00 on 15 April enemy patrols approached the positions, and at noon a heavy bombardment began. At 14.45 the enemy advanced behind an intense barrage but were held off with Lewis gun and rifle fire. At 16.30 the 4th Lincolns on the left was forced back, but it formed a defensive flank and maintained contact with the 2/5th Bn. At 17.25 the enemy broke through the 4th Bn and got behind the left flank of the 2/5th Bn while a frontal attack was made simultaneously. D Company on the left was overrun after desperate fighting. The remainder of the battalion formed a flank but was forced back to join the rest of 177th Bde north-east of Bailleul. 177th Brigade withdrew to Locre that night. The battalion's casualties in this action (the Battle of Bailleul) were 356.

The weak 2/5th Bn was formed into a composite battalion with 4th Lincolns under the command of Maj R.N. Holmes of the 4th. 'Holmes's Battalion' formed part of 'James's Force', about 2000 men drawn from the 59th Division, which served with 49th (West Riding) Division. The composite battalion suffered further casualties while digging positions near Locre on 17–19 April.

By now the 59th Division had suffered such heavy losses that it was temporarily disbanded in May and its battalions reduced to cadres sent to train new drafts at Saint-Omer. 2/5th Lincolns was briefly attached to 30th Division and then to the 66th (2nd East Lancashire) Division. The battalion was disbanded on 31 July and the remnants sent to the 1/5th Bn (see above).

=== 3/5th Battalion ===
This battalion was formed on 17 April 1915 at Grimsby. It became the 5th Reserve Bn on 8 April 1916 and on 1 September 1916 it was absorbed by the 4th Reserve Bn in the North Midlands Reserve Brigade at Saltfleet, Lincolnshire.

=== 13th Battalion ===
The Home Service men of the TF battalions of the Lincolns, Leicesters and South Staffordshire Regiment were formed into 28th Provisional Battalion at Southend-on-Sea in June 1915, forming part of 8th Provisional Brigade for coastal defence. The Military Service Act 1916 swept away the Home/Foreign Service distinction, whereupon all TF soldiers became liable for overseas service, if medically fit. The role of the Provisional Battalions changed to physical conditioning to render men fit for drafting overseas. 8th Provisional Brigade became 72nd Division, with 28th Provisional Bn assigned to 215th Brigade. On 1 January 1917 the 28th Provisional Battalion became the 13th Battalion, Lincolnshire Regiment at Bedford. In May 1917 it moved to Ipswich. It was disbanded on 31 October 1917.

== Interwar ==
The 5th Lincolns was reconstituted in the TF (renamed Territorial Army (TA) in 1921) on 16 February 1920, once more forming part of 138th (Lincolnshire and Leicestershire) Brigade in 46th (North Midland) Division.

The sub-units were distributed as follows:

- A Company
  - 1, 2, 3 & 4 Platoons at Grimsby
- B Company
  - 5 & 6 Platoons at Louth
  - 7 Platoon at Alford
  - 8 Platoon at Spilsby
- C Company
  - 9, 10 & 11 Platoons at Gainsborough
  - 12 Platoon at Barton-upon-Humber
- D Company
  - 13, 14 & 15 Platoons at Scunthorpe
  - 16 Platoon at Brigg

It was found that recruiting was excellent at Gainsborough and poor at Grimsby and Brigg, so Barton was assigned to A Company until the machine-gun platoon was established, and the platoon at Brigg (which had no drill hall) was abolished. The band, signallers, pioneers and transport section were also raised at Gainsborough. During the coal strike of April 1921 a temporary Defence Force was formed, with one unit being raised at the 5th Lincolns' HQ and then concentrated at the former Royal Naval Air Station Killingholme. This event spurred recruitment to the TA unit after the Defence Force was stood down.

In November 1933 the battalion re-established a drill station at Brigg, and recruitment there was now so successful that within two years the hired accommodation was inadequate and the Lincolnshire TA Association and War Office (WO) built a new detachment HQ.

=== 46th (Lincolnshire Regiment) AA Battalion ===
In December 1936 the 46th (North Midland) Division was disbanded and its headquarters was reconstituted as 2 Anti-Aircraft Division to control the increasing number of anti-aircraft (AA) units being created north of London. At the same time, several of its infantry battalions were converted into searchlight (S/L) battalions of the Royal Engineers (RE). The 5th Lincolns was one of these, becoming 46th (The Lincolnshire Regiment) Anti-Aircraft Battalion, RE (TA), with HQ and 382, 384 and 385 AA Companies at Grimsby, while 383 AA Company drew its personnel from Barton and Brigg. It formed part of 31st (North Midland) Anti-Aircraft Group in 2 AA Division. After the Royal Artillery (RA) renamed its gun 'brigades' as 'regiments', the group was redesignated 31st AA Brigade in November 1938.

90 cm Projector Anti-Aircraft, displayed at Fort Nelson, Hampshire

== Second World War ==
=== Mobilisation ===
The TA's AA units were mobilised on 23 September 1938 during the Munich Crisis, with units manning their emergency positions within 24 hours, even though many did not yet have their full complement of men or equipment. The emergency lasted three weeks, and they were stood down on 13 October. In February 1939 the existing AA defences came under the control of a new Anti-Aircraft Command. In June a partial mobilisation of TA units was begun in a process known as 'couverture', whereby each AA unit did a month's tour of duty in rotation to man selected AA and searchlight positions. On 24 August, ahead of the declaration of war, AA Command was fully mobilised at its war stations.

Upon mobilisation, 46th AA Bn (with 383, 384 and 385 AA Cos) was part of 39th AA Bde in 2 AA Division covering the Humber and Scunthorpe. By October the regiment was controlling 306 AA Co from 27th (London Electrical Engineers) AA Bn as well as all four of its own companies. In November, 306 AA Company moved into the Grimsby area to make that a lighted Gun Zone. In February 1940, 306 and 383 AA Cos took over eight S/L sites on the East Coast that were positioned to pick up low-flying aircraft laying Parachute mines in the mouth of the Humber.

In March and April 1940, the battalion (less 384 AA Co) handed its S/L sites over to 30th (Surrey) AA Bn and moved to the Newcastle upon Tyne area under 7 AA Division, where it took over sites from 37th (Tyne Electrical Engineers) AA Bn at Newcastle, Morpeth and Sunderland.

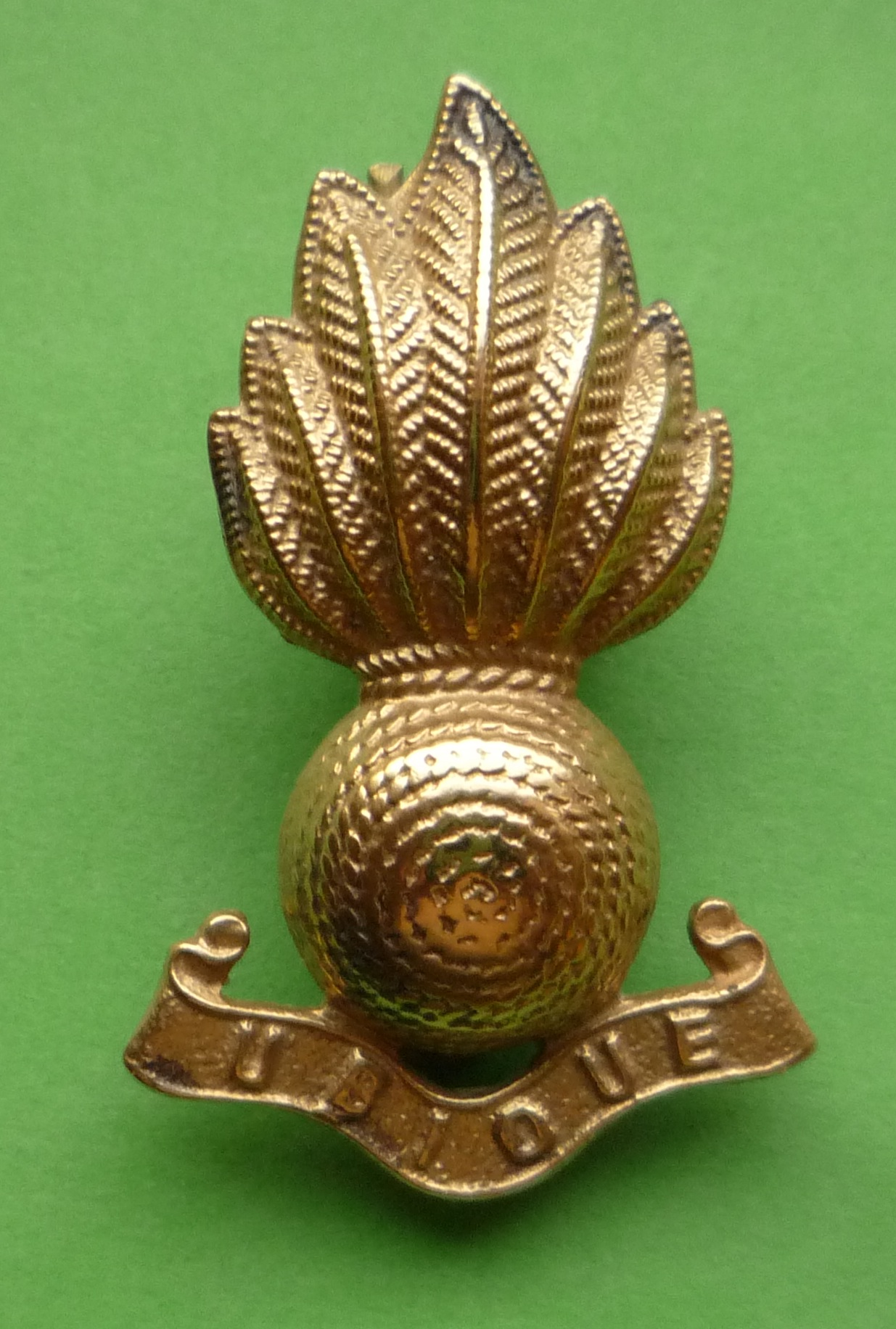
RA collar badge

=== Battle of Britain and Blitz ===
When the RE's AA battalions were transferred to the Royal Artillery (RA) in August 1940, the battalion became 46th (Lincolnshire Regiment) Searchlight Regiment, RA, retaining its Lincolns cap badge, although officers wore RA collar badges. The AA companies were redesignated S/L batteries.

By now the Battle of Britain was on; the regiment had transferred to 57 Light AA Bde in 7 AA Division and served with it during the Blitz, including the raids on Newcastle (the Newcastle Blitz).

The regiment supplied a cadre of experienced officers and men to 234th S/L Training Rgt at Carlisle where it provided the basis for a new 540 S/L Bty formed on 12 December 1940. This battery later joined a newly forming 88th S/L Rgt.

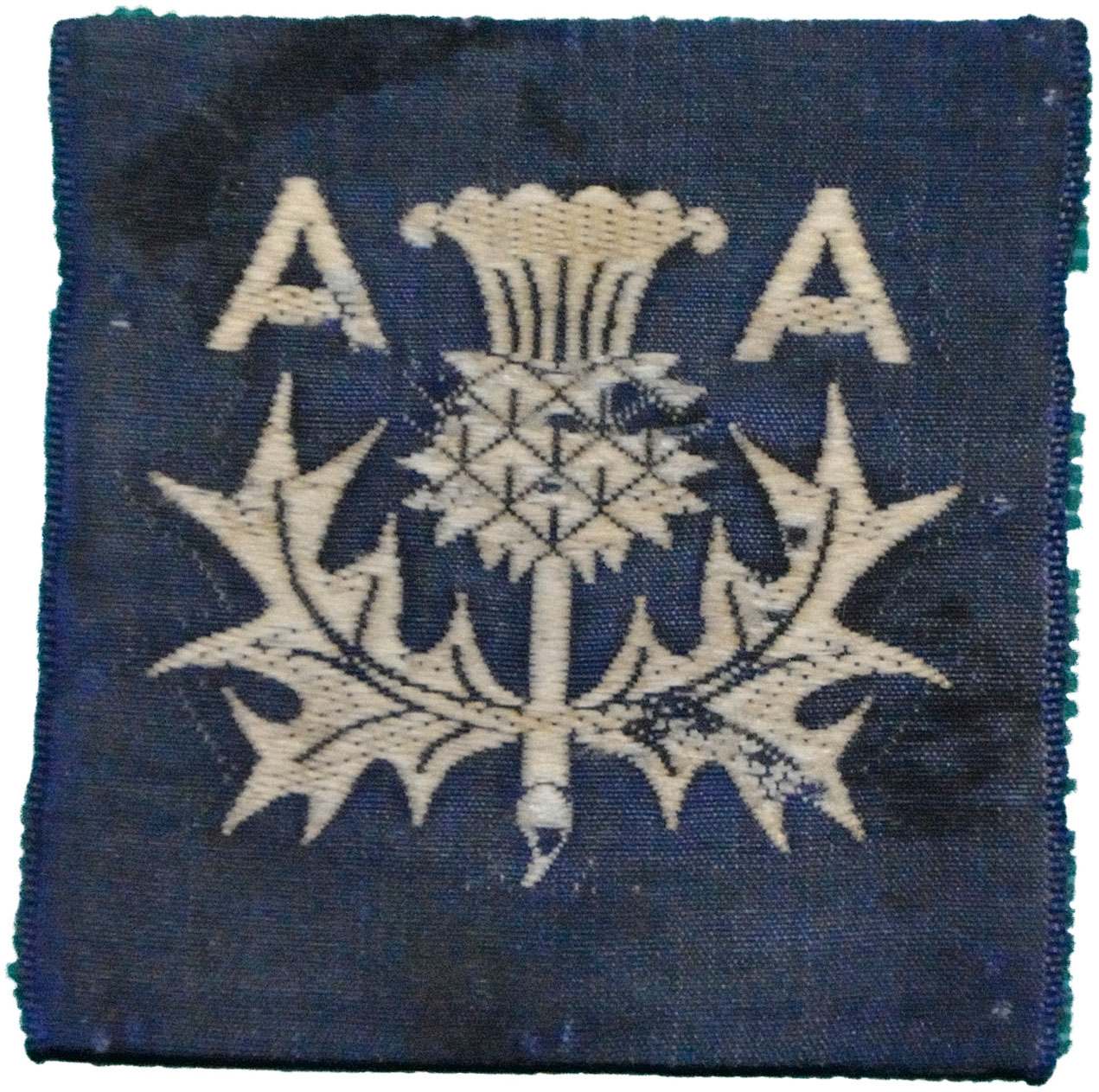
3 AA Divisional formation sign

In December 1941 the regiment moved north to Scotland when it transferred to 36 (Scottish) AA Bde in 3 AA Division covering Edinburgh and the Forth. In August 1942 it moved further north still, and joined 58 AA Bde in the Orkney and Shetland Defences (OSDEF).

During May 1943, 382 and 385 S/L Btys were attached to 59 AA Bde in OSDEF and 384 Bty to 4 AA Group covering mainland Scotland. Then in July, 382 S/L Bty under Major P.J.T. Haxby moved to the far end of the United Kingdom and was attached to 103 AA Bde (a field force formation) in Cornwall, with Bty HQ at Truro, A Trp at Rosemullion, B Trp at RAF St Eval, C Trp at RAF Portreath and D Trp at RAF Predannack.

The regiment left OSDEF in October 1943 and transferred to 60 AA Bde in 3 AA Group covering South West England. By now, AA Command was being forced to release manpower for overseas service, particularly Operation Overlord (the planned Allied invasion of Normandy) and most S/L regiments lost one of their four batteries. On 25 February 1944 385 S/L Bty began disbanding, completing the process by 24 March.

=== North West Europe ===
By the end of 1944, the German Luftwaffe was suffering from such shortages of pilots, aircraft and fuel that serious aerial attacks on the UK could be discounted and the WO began disbanding surplus AA units and reorganising others into infantry battalions for duties in the rear areas. On 30 September 1944 384 Bty became independent, and on 8 October the remainder of the regiment was ordered to disband at Yealmpton, Devon. However, on 1 November the disbandment order was cancelled and 384 Bty rejoined. On 4 November 1944 RHQ with 382-4 Btys was converted into 46th (Lincolnshire Regiment) Garrison Regiment, RA.

Meanwhile, 21st Army Group fighting in North West Europe was suffering a severe manpower shortage, particularly among the infantry. In January 1945, the WO accelerated the conversion of surplus artillery into infantry units, primarily for line of communication and occupation duties, thereby releasing trained infantry for frontline service. 46 Garrison Regiment was redesignated again, becoming 606 Infantry Regiment, RA in February. It went to North West Europe the following month and did duty with Second Army until VE Day.

606 Regiment was placed in suspended animation on 4 February 1946 in Belgium.

== Postwar ==
When the TA was reconstituted on 1 January 1947 the regiment was reformed as 581 (5th Battalion Royal Lincolnshire Regiment) (Mixed) Heavy Anti-Aircraft Regiment, RA ('mixed') indicating that members of the Women's Royal Army Corps were integrated into the unit). The Regimental HQ was at the TA Centre in Coldyhill Lane, Scunthorpe, with a detached battery at Barton on Humber. It formed part of 57 AA Bde (the former 31 (North Midland) AA Bde, now headquartered at Immingham), but this was disbanded by September 1948.

In 1955, AA Command was disbanded and there were wholescale mergers among its units. 581st HAA joined 462 and 529 HAA and formed R (5th Bn Royal Lincolnshire Regiment) Battery in a new 440th (Humber) Light AA Rgt. After the TA was reduced to the TAVR in 1967, 440 (Humber) Rgt became an infantry unit and was then reduced to a cadre. When it was reformed in 1971 the Lincolnshire Regiment link was discontinued.

== Honorary Colonel ==
The following served as Honorary Colonel of the battalion:

- Col George Beaumont Walker, VD (CO 1908–1912), appointed 30 August 1912
- Charles Pelham, 4th Earl of Yarborough, appointed 30 September 1922
- Field Marshal Sir Archibald Montgomery-Massingberd, appointed 17 March 1937

== Memorials ==
The actions of the 46th (North) Midland Division at the Hohenzollern Redoubt on 13 October 1915 and the St Quentin Canal on 29 October 1918 are marked by three memorials (see gallery). A cross and candlesticks bearing the divisional badge of the 59th (2nd North Midland) Division were presented to Lincoln Cathedral (as well as memorials in other churches associated with the division's other regiments).

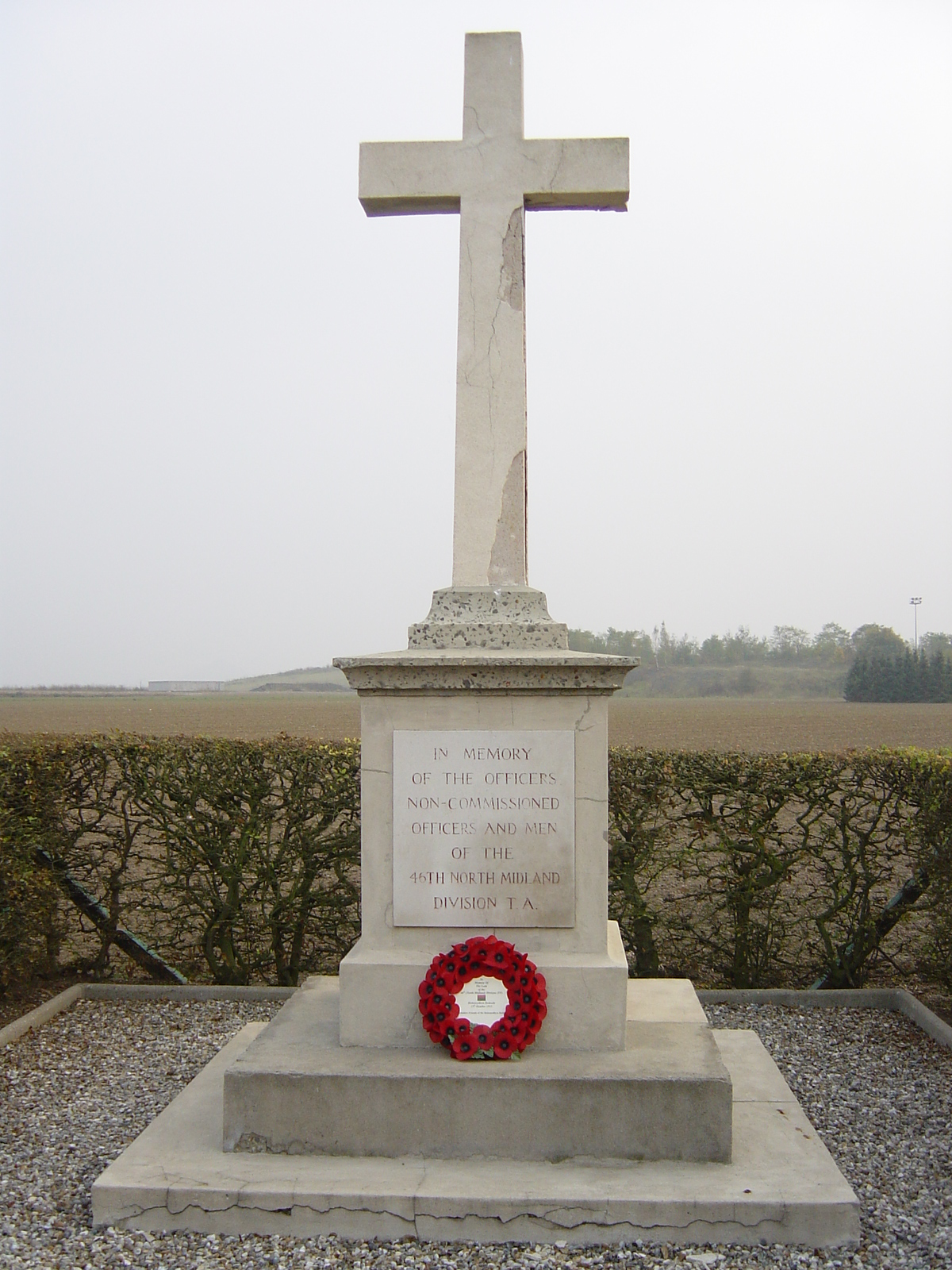
Memorial at Vermelles, starting point for the division's attack on 13 October 1915

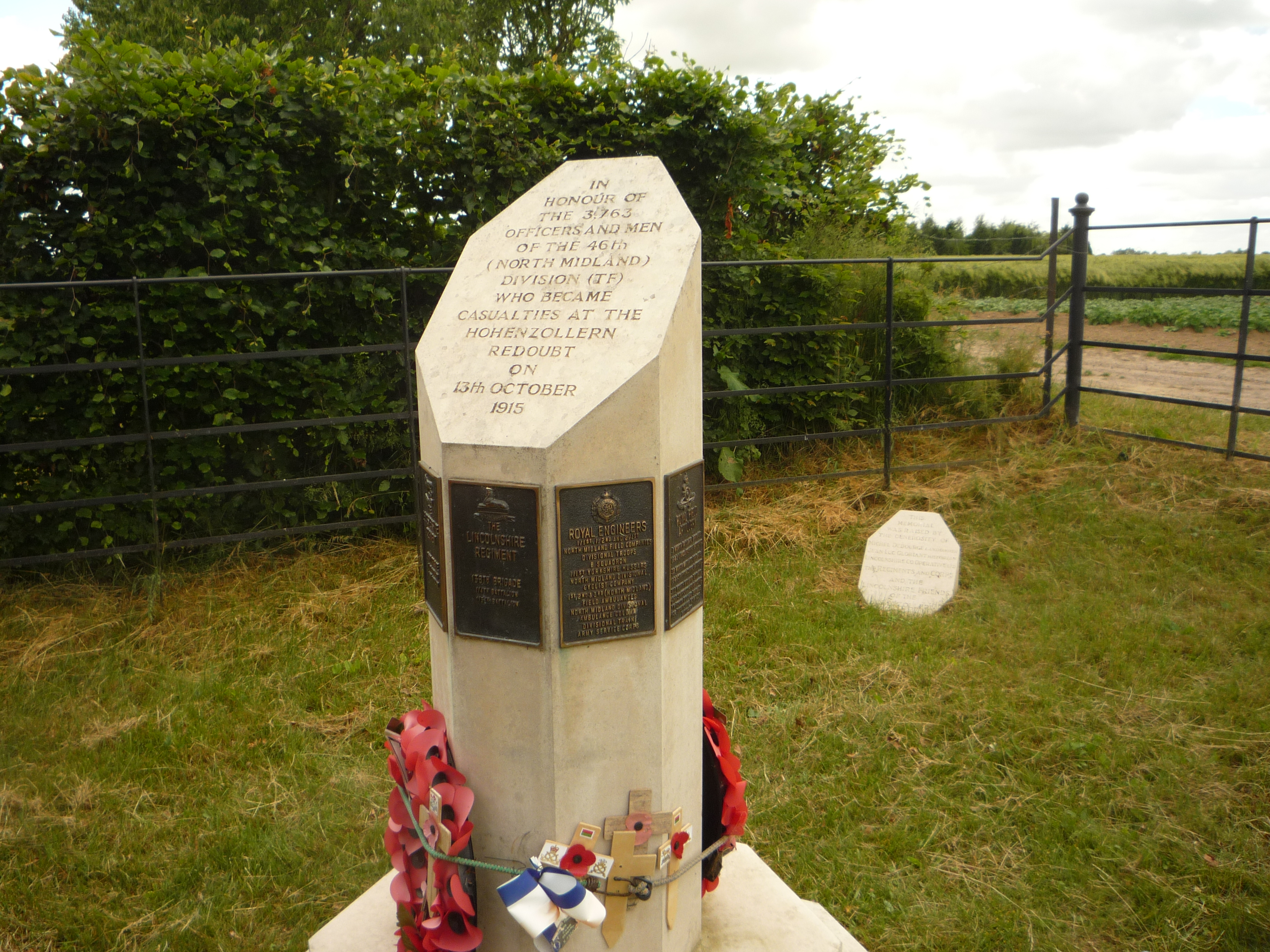
Memorial at Cité de Madagascar, site of the Hohenzollern Redoubt

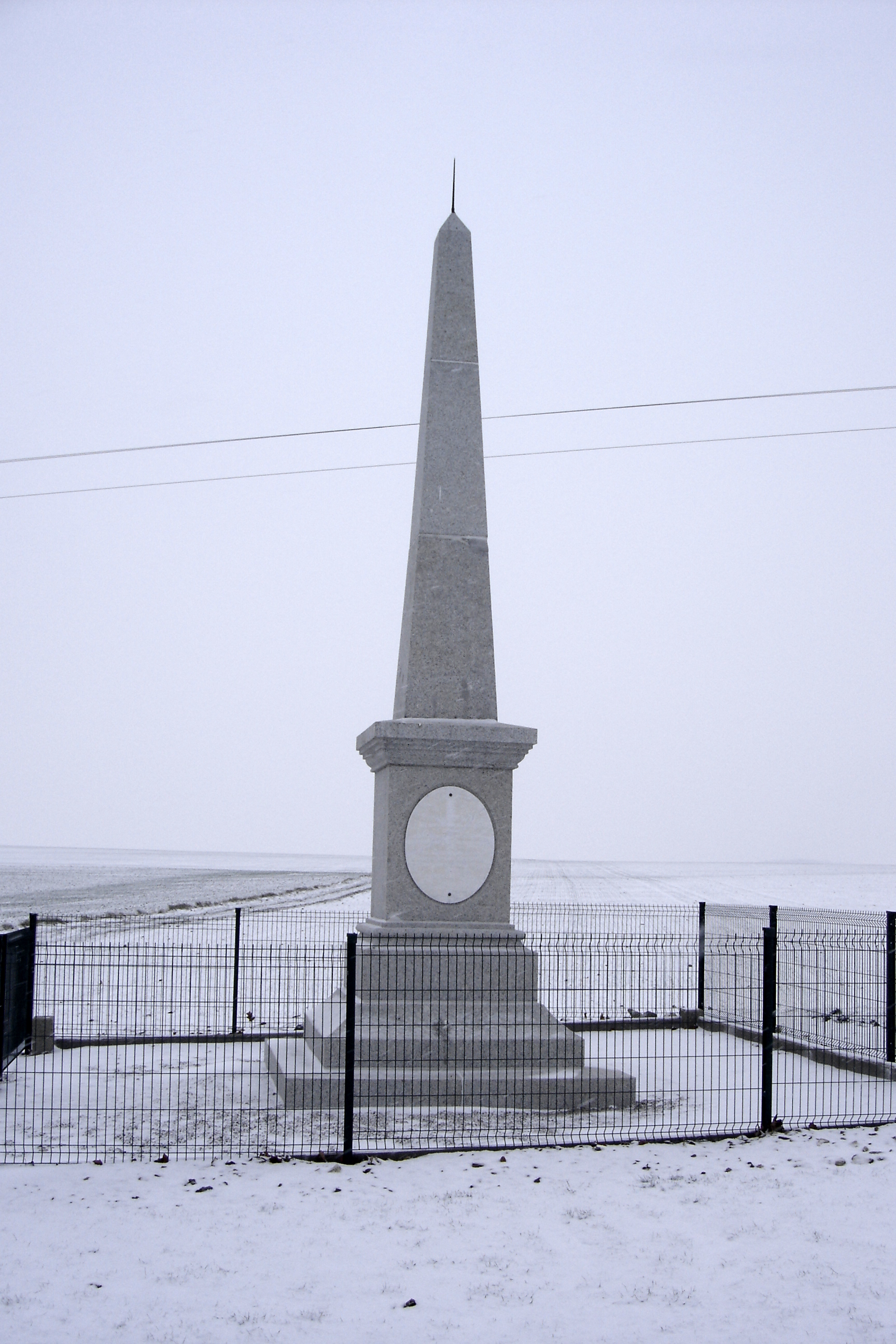
Memorial near Bellenglise (St Quentin Canal)

== External sources ==
- British Army units from 1945 on
- British Military History
- The Drill Hall Project
- Great War Centenary Drill Halls.
- The Long, Long Trail
- Orders of Battle at Patriot Files
- David Porter's work on Provisional Brigades at Great War Forum
- Land Forces of Britain, the Empire and Commonwealth (Regiments.org) – archive site
- Royal Artillery 1939–1945
- Graham Watson, The Territorial Army 1947
- Yorkshire Volunteers website
