= 64th (Northumbrian) Heavy Anti-Aircraft Regiment, Royal Artillery =

64th (Northumbrian) Heavy Anti-Aircraft Regiment, RA 464th (Northumbrian) Heavy Anti-Aircraft Regiment, RA
- Cap Badge of the Royal Artillery (pre-1953)
- Active: 10 December 1936 – 1 January 1954
- Country: United Kingdom
- Branch: Territorial Army
- Role: Air Defence
- Size: Regiment
- Garrison/HQ: North Shields; Whitley Bay
- Engagements: Battle of Britain; Newcastle Blitz; North Africa; Italy; Yugoslavia; Occupation of Germany

The 64th (Northumbrian) Heavy Anti-Aircraft Regiment, Royal Artillery, was an air defence unit of Britain's Territorial Army (TA) formed on Tyneside during the 1930s. After defending the UK during the Battle of Britain and the Blitz early in World War II, it went on to see service in North Africa, Italy, Yugoslavia and Germany. It continued in the postwar TA until it was amalgamated in 1954.

== Origins ==
As Britain expanded its anti-aircraft (AA) defences in the 1930s, one of the new units created was 64th (Northumbrian) AA Brigade of the Royal Artillery. Formed on 10 December 1936 and based at North Shields on Tyneside, it brought together two existing medium batteries (both had originally been heavy batteries of the Tynemouth Heavy Brigade):

- 179 (Tynemouth) AA Battery at North Shields – converted from 150 Medium Battery of 51st (Midland) Medium Brigade
- 180 (Tynemouth) AA Battery at Seaton Delaval – converted from 152 Medium Battery of 55th (Northumbrian) Medium Brigade

The regiment formed part of 30th (Northumbrian) AA Group in 2nd AA Division.

In March 1938, two AA batteries at Middlesbrough on Teesside were also regimented with the 64th (Northumbrian):

- 174 (1st North Riding) AA Battery – transferred from 62nd (Northumbrian) AA Brigade
- 175 (2nd North Riding) AA Battery – transferred from 62nd (Northumbrian) AA Brigade

However, on 1 November 1938, 174 and 175 batteries left to form a new 85th (Tees) AA Brigade, and were replaced in 64th (Northumbrian) by a newly formed 268 (Durham) AA Bty at Consett in County Durham.

On 1 January 1939, the RA replaced its traditional unit designation 'Brigade' by the modern 'Regiment', which allowed the 'AA Groups' to take the more usual formation title of 'Brigades'.

== World War II ==
=== Mobilisation and Phoney War ===
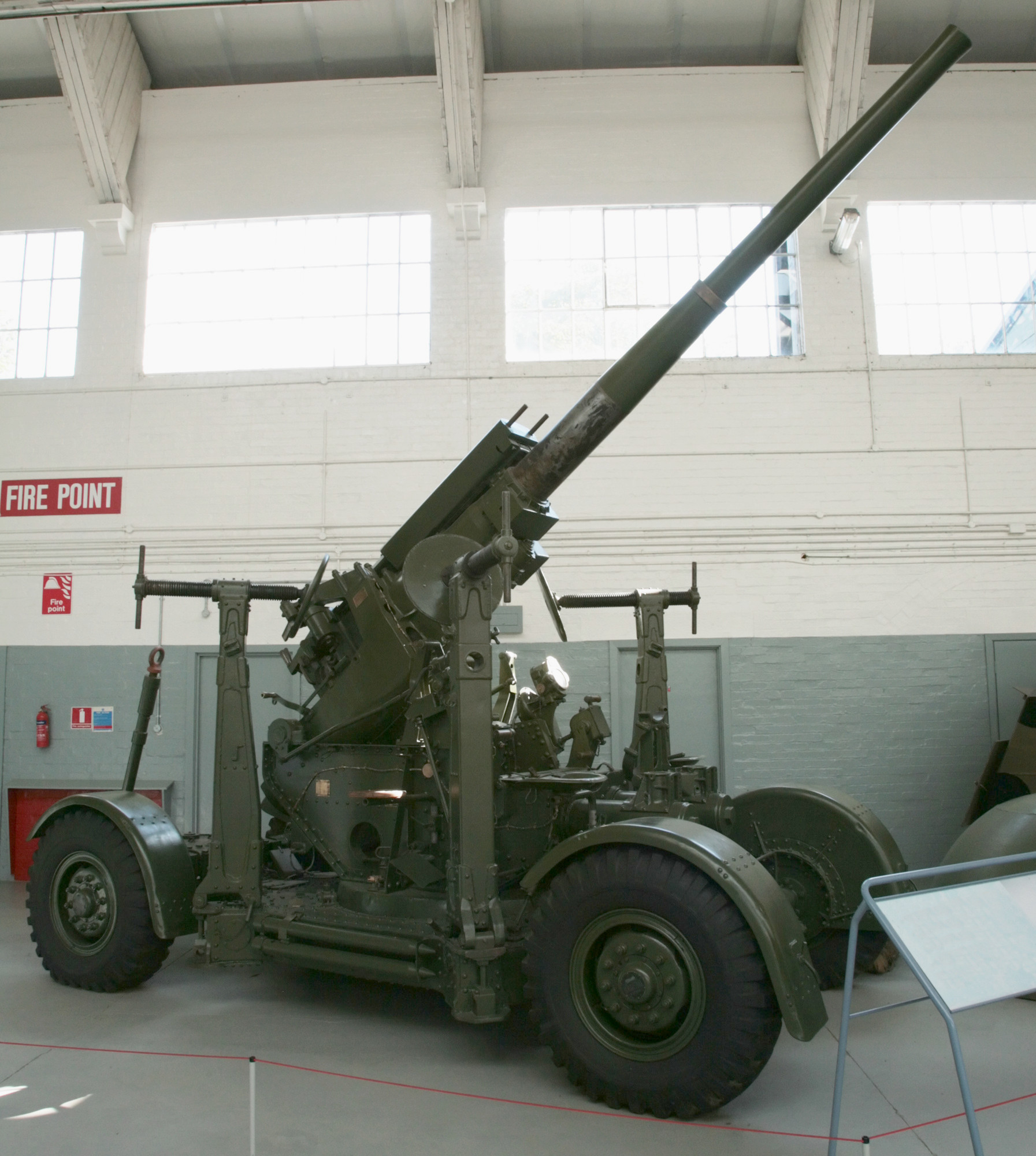
3.7-inch HAA gun preserved at Imperial War Museum Duxford.

The TA's AA units were mobilised on 23 September 1938 during the Munich Crisis, with units manning their emergency positions within 24 hours, even though many did not yet have their full complement of men or equipment. The emergency lasted three weeks, and they were stood down on 13 October. In February 1939, the existing AA defences came under the control of a new Anti-Aircraft Command. In June, a partial mobilisation of TA units was begun in a process known as 'couverture', whereby each AA unit did a month's tour of duty in rotation to man selected AA and searchlight positions. On 24 August, ahead of the declaration of war, AA Command was fully mobilised at its war stations.

As war broke out, 30th AA Brigade on Tyneside was transferring to 7th Anti-Aircraft Division, which was being formed to cover North East England. In September 1939, the Tyne Gun Defence Area (GDA) only had 34 3-inch or 3.7-inch guns in the Heavy AA (HAA) role. Luckily, the months of the Phoney War that followed mobilisation allowed AA Command to address its equipment shortages. 64th (Northumbrian), in common with other AA units manning 3-inch guns or larger, was redesignated HAA on 1 June 1940 to distinguish them from the new Light AA (LAA) units entering the order of battle.

=== Battle of Britain ===
Tyneside, Wearside, and Teesside were important strategic targets because of their high concentrations of heavy industry and ports. During the early part of the Battle of Britain, German day and night air raids and mine laying began along the East Coast of England, intensifying throughout June 1940. Thereafter, the Luftwaffe concentrated on Royal Air Force (RAF) sites in the South of England, with occasional raids on the North East, such as the period 12–15 August.

On 15 August, in the belief that the defences of NE England had been denuded, Luftflotte 5 attacked across the North Sea from bases in Occupied Norway. Some 65 Heinkel He 111 bombers of Kampfgeschwader 26 escorted by 35 Messerschmitt Bf 110 Zerstörer fighters of Zerstörergeschwader 76 were picked up on radar and ambushed by fighters of No. 13 Group RAF before they reached the coast. Those bombers that succeeded in breaking through then split into two groups, one being engaged by the guns of the Tyne GDA the other by the Tees GDA. Bombs were widely scattered and only at Sunderland was any major damage inflicted. KG 26 lost 8 bombers and ZG 76 lost 7 fighters, for no loss to the RAF, in 'one of the most successful air actions of the war'.

By 21 August, the Tyne GDA had 50 HAA guns in position.

=== Blitz ===
The Battle of Britain was followed by the Luftwaffe 's night Blitz on London and other industrial cities during the winter of 1940–41. Again, NE England escaped the worst of this, but hundreds of people died during the Newcastle Blitz and there were other notable air raids on Tyneside on 9 April and Sunderland on 25 April.

AA Command was now reaching its peak strength: the regiment provided the cadre for a new 404 HAA Bty formed on 12 December 1940 at 211th HAA Training Rgt, Oswestry, which joined 123rd HAA Rgt. 427 HAA Battery, formed at 211th HAA Training Rgt on 24 April 1941 from a cadre supplied by 54th (City of London) HAA Rgt, then joined 64th (Northumbrian) on 22 July. Meanwhile, the regiment had also supplied the cadre for 431 HAA Bty, which was formed on 8 May 1941 at 210th HAA Training Rgt, Oswestry. This battery joined 64 HAA Rgt on 6 August to replace 427, which had been transferred on to 101st HAA Rgt.

=== Mid-War ===
The main Blitz ended in May 1941, but occasional raids continued. 64th HAA Regiment remained in 30 AA Bde for the rest of the year. As newly formed units joined AA Command, experienced ones began to be posted away for service overseas. This accelerated in 1942 with the preparations for the Allied invasion of North Africa (Operation Torch).

On 12 January 1942, 431 HAA Bty transferred to 102nd HAA Rgt and was temporarily replaced by 414 HAA Bty from 123rd HAA Rgt. But 414 Bty moved within 30 AA Bde to 146th HAA Rgt on 1 February, leaving 64th HAA Rgt with just its three most experienced batteries: 179, 180 and 268; the war establishment for overseas service being a three-battery organisation. It left 30 AA Bde in April, and in June left AA Command altogether.

The regiment now came under War Office control preparatory to going overseas. As was normal practice, after training it was lent back to AA Command until it was required, coming first under 72 AA Bde, then from October under 5 AA Bde both in 2 AA Group, which was dealing with 'hit and run' raids by the Luftwaffe along the South Coast of England.

=== North Africa ===
'Operation Torch' began in November 1942, but, by February 1943, the regiment was still in the UK as part of GHQ Reserve with the following organisation as a mobile unit:

- 179, 180, 268 HAA Btys
- 1504 HAA Rgt Platoon, Royal Army Service Corps (RASC)
- 64 HAA Rgt Workshop Section, Royal Electrical and Mechanical Engineers (REME)

64th HAA Regiment sailed in March 1943, and when the Tunisian Campaign ended with the fall of Tunis in May it was still en route to join 18th Army Group at Bougie. In July 1943, it was with Allied Force Headquarters and was assigned to Eighth Army for the Allied invasion of mainland Italy in September.

=== Italy ===
The armies in Italy called in AA units progressively from North Africa as their defensive commitments grew. 64th (Northumbrian) HAA Rgt landed with 25 AA Bde in late December 1943. Two of its batteries (16 x 3.7-inch guns) were sent to Bari, where the air defences were being strengthened after the disastrous Air raid on Bari of 2 December, while 268 HAA Bty (8 x 3.7-inch) went to Barletta. Bari continued to attract Luftwaffe attention, particularly night raids accompanied by 'Window' to jam radar. The HAA batteries' GL Mk II gunlaying radar was least affected, and their sets were used to direct searchlights as well. 25 AA Brigade also set up a decoy site outside Bari and stationed some of its guns there to attract bombers away from the vital port.

=== Yugoslavia ===
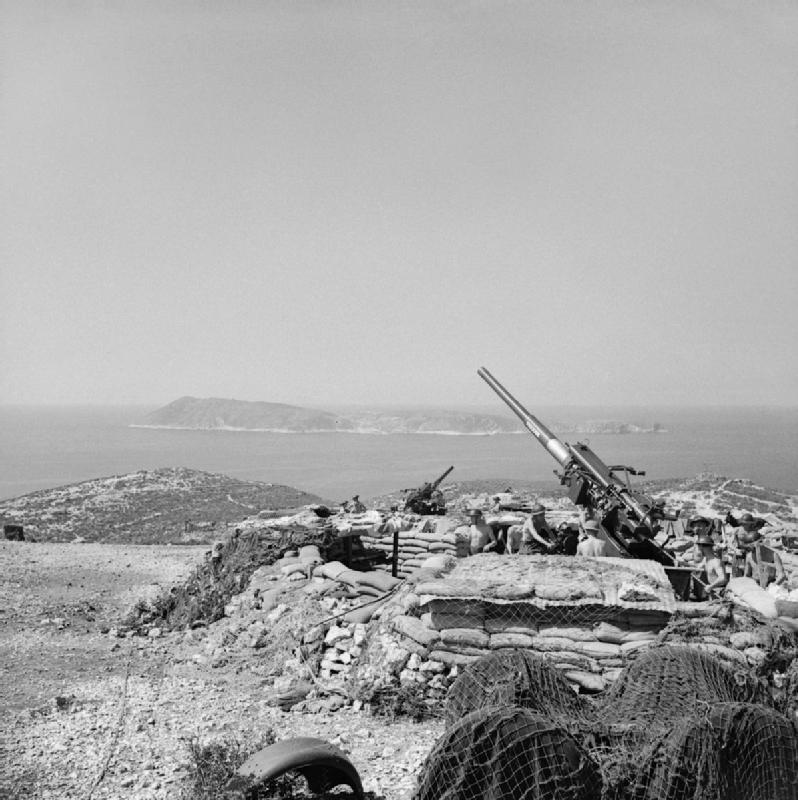
3.7-inch guns of 64th HAA Regiment on the island of Vis off the coast of Yugoslavia, August 1944.

In March 1944, the British sent forces to garrison the island of Vis off the Croatian coast, which was the headquarters of the Yugoslav Partisans and the base for Royal Navy and Royal Marines raiding parties. AA defences were required for the airfield through which aid for the Partisans was channelled. 64th HAA Regiment was sent to provide the HAA component of this force, and it took over command of 24 x Bofors 40 mm guns of 31st LAA Rgt that were already deployed there. The Luftwaffe was weak in the Adriatic but by September both 64th HAA and 31st LAA had batteries in the Partisan front lines in Yugoslavia providing ground support fire.

=== Germany ===
In early 1945, the deployment to VIs ended, 25 AA Bde was disbanded, and 64th HAA Rgt became non-operational. But, unlike many other AA regiments in Italy that were being disbanded to provide infantry manpower, 64th HAA Rgt was transferred to the North West Europe theatre as a complete unit. By February 1945, it was serving in Second Army in its advance across Germany. In April 1945, it was under 31 AA Bde, which commanded the occupation troops and coast defences of the Friesland area. The AA gunners were by now operating as infantry.

After VE Day, the regiment continued occupation duties in British Army of the Rhine until it was placed in suspended animation on 21 February 1946.

== Postwar ==
When the TA was reconstituted on 1 January 1947, the regiment reformed at Whitley Bay as 464 (Northumbrian) HAA Regiment, forming part of 83 AA Bde. It became a 'Mixed' unit on 1 October 1948 when members of the Women's Royal Army Corps were integrated into the regiment.

On 1 January 1954, it was amalgamated into 405 (Tynemouth) HAA Rgt, which also descended from the Tynemouth Heavy Bde that had originally supplied the regiment's first two batteries.

== Honorary Colonel ==
- Lt-Col C.W. Brims, CBE, MC, TD, was appointed Honorary Colonel of the unit on 19 May 1937.
