= 7th Anti-Aircraft Division =

- Formation sign of the 7th Anti-Aircraft Division, referencing the 7th sign of the zodiac.
- Active: 16 September 1939 – 30 September 1942
- Country: United Kingdom
- Branch: Territorial Army
- Type: Anti-Aircraft Division
- Role: Air Defence
- Size: 3–5 Brigades
- Part of: Anti-Aircraft Command (1939–40); III AA Corps (1940–42)
- Garrison/HQ: Newcastle upon Tyne
- Engagements: Battle of Britain; The Blitz

The 7th Anti-Aircraft Division was an air defence formation of the British Army during the early years of the Second World War. It defended North East England during the Battle of Britain and The Blitz.

== Mobilisation ==
The 7th Anti-Aircraft Division was created in 1939 by Anti-Aircraft Command to control the anti-aircraft (AA) defences of North East England, Yorkshire and Humberside. It took over brigades from the 2nd AA Division, which then concentrated on defending the North Midlands and East Midlands, and from the 3rd AA Division defending Scotland. Planned from February 1939 and established in June, the new division's exact responsibilities were still being worked out when war broke out. The Divisional headquarters (HQ) was established at Newcastle upon Tyne on 16 September and the first General Officer Commanding (GOC) was Major-General T.G.G. Heywood, who had been Brigadier, Royal Artillery, in Aldershot Command. AA Command mobilised fully on 24 August, ahead of the official declaration of war on 3 September.

=== Order of Battle 1939–40 ===
On mobilisation, the 7th AA Division was intended to be constituted as follows:

30th (Northumbrian) Anti-Aircraft Brigade at Sunderland – from the 2nd AA Division

- 63rd (Northumbrian) AA Regt, Royal Artillery (RA) – heavy anti-aircraft (HAA) unit converted from medium artillery 1936
  - 176, 177, 178, 269 Batteries
- 64th (Northumbrian) AA Regt, RA – HAA batteries converted from medium artillery 1936
  - 179, 180, 268 Btys
- 87th AA Regt, RA – HAA unit raised April 1939
  - 278, 279, 280 Btys
- 37th (Tyne Electrical Engineers) AA Bn, Royal Engineers (RE) – searchlight (S/L) unit
  - 307, 308, 348, 349 Companies
- 5th Battalion, Royal Northumberland Fusiliers (53rd Searchlight Regiment) – S/L unit converted from infantry 1938
  - 408, 409, 410 Companies
- 30th AA Brigade Company, Royal Army Service Corps (RASC)

31st (North Midland) Anti-Aircraft Brigade at York – from the 2nd AA Division

- 66th (Leeds Rifles) AA Regt, RA – HAA unit converted from infantry 1936
  - 184, 185, 197 Btys
- 96th AA Regt RA – HAA unit raised April 1939
  - 186, 287, 295, 296 Btys
- 43rd (Duke of Wellington's Regiment) AA Bn, RE – S/L unit converted from infantry 1936
  - 370, 371, 372, 373 Companies
- 49th (West Yorkshire Regiment) AA Bn, RE – S/L unit converted from infantry 1936
  - 395, 396, 397, 398 Companies
- 31st AA Brigade Company, RASC

39th Anti-Aircraft Brigade at RAF Digby – from the 2nd AA Division; did not actually transfer

- 62nd (Northumbrian) AA Regiment, RA – HAA unit converted from field artillery 1936
  - 172, 173, 266 Btys
- 67th (York and Lancaster Regiment) AA Regiment, RA – HAA unit converted from infantry 1936
  - 187, 188, 189, 198 Btys
- 91st AA Regiment, RA – HAA unit raised April 1939
  - 221, 270, 286 Btys
- 40th (Sherwood Foresters) AA Battalion, RE – S/L unit converted from infantry 1936
  - 358, 359, 360, 361 Companies
- 46th (Lincolnshire Regiment) AA Battalion, RE – S/L unit converted from infantry 1936
  - 382, 383, 384, 385 Companies
- 39th AA Brigade Company, RASC

43rd Anti-Aircraft Brigade at West Hartlepool – from the 3rd AA Division

- 85th (Tees) AA Regiment, RA – HAA unit raised 1938
  - 174, 175, 220 Btys
- 47th (Durham Light Infantry) AA Battalion, RE – S/L unit converted from infantry 1936
  - 386, 387, 388, 389 Companies
- 1/5th Battalion, Durham Light Infantry (54th Searchlight Regiment) – S/L unit converted from infantry 1938
  - 411, 412, 413 Companies
- 2/5th Battalion, Durham Light Infantry (55th Searchlight Regiment) – duplicate S/L unit raised April 1939
  - 414, 415, 416 Companies
- 43rd AA Brigade Company, RASC

57th Light Anti-Aircraft Brigade – new brigade forming at Newcastle

- 13th Light AA Regiment, RA – light anti-aircraft (LAA) unit raised 1938
  - 37, 38, 122 Btys
- 28th Light AA Regiment, RA – LAA unit raised August 1939
  - 53, 112, 113 Btys
- 29th Light AA Regiment, RA – LAA unit raised August 1939
  - 108, 121 Btys
- 30th Light AA Regiment, RA – LAA unit raised August 1939
  - 117, 118, 119, 120 Btys
- 57th AA Brigade Company, RASC
- 7th AA Divisional Signals, Royal Corps of Signals (RCS) – formed 1939 at Darlington, possibly from elements of 50th (Northumbrian) Infantry Divisional Signals
- 7th AA Divisional Workshop Company, Royal Army Ordnance Corps (RAOC)

In practice, the 39th AA Brigade remained with the 2nd AA Division; however, on 23 September 1939, responsibility for the Humber Gun Zone (including 30 HAA guns manned by 62nd (Northumbrian) and 91st AA Rgts) was transferred from the 39th AA Brigade to the 31st AA Brigade. This responsibility reverted to the 39th AA Brigade and the 2nd AA Division in May 1940.

== Phoney War ==
However, equipment was critically short. In August 1939, the 7th AA Division only had the following:

- 3-inch AA guns: 14
- Bofors 40 mm and 2-pounder LAA guns: 22
- Light Machine Guns (LMGs – mainly Lewis guns): 486
- S/Ls: 673

(In addition to the LAA LMGs, each S/L position had an LMG for self defence).

Luckily, the months of the Phoney War that followed mobilisation allowed AA Command to address its equipment shortages. Gun Defence Areas (GDAs) with 3-inch or 3.7-inch HAA guns were established around Leeds, Teesside (including Middlesbrough and Billingham) and Tyneside (including Newcastle). Vital Points (VPs) such as RAF Fighter Command airfields and factories began to receive a few Bofors guns.

AA Command was also desperate for manpower. When the War Office released the first intakes of Militiamen to the Command in early 1940, most were found to be in low physical categories and without training. The 31st AA Brigade reported that out of 1000 recruits sent for duty, '50 had to be discharged immediately because of serious medical defects, another 20 were judged to be mentally deficient and a further 18 were unfit to do any manual labour such as lifting ammunition'. Fitness and training was greatly improved by the time Britain's AA defences were seriously tested during the Battle of Britain and Blitz.

In 1940, RA regiments equipped with 3-inch or 3.7-inch AA guns were designated Heavy Anti-Aircraft (HAA) to distinguish them from the new Light Anti-Aircraft (LAA) regiments, and RE AA battalions were transferred to the RA and designated Searchlight (S/L) regiments.

After the German invasion of the Low Countries in May 1940, Maj-Gen Heywood was appointed head of the British Military Mission to the Netherlands and briefly replaced as GOC of the 7th AA Division by Maj-Gen J.E.T Younger, promoted from command of the 57th LAA Brigade. Within days, Younger was transferred to command the 3rd AA Division and later was replaced by Maj-Gen R.B. Pargiter from the 4th AA Division.

== Battle of Britain ==
Tyneside, Wearside, and Teesside were important strategic targets because of their high concentrations of heavy industry and ports. During the early part of the Battle of Britain, German day and night air raids and mine laying began along the East Coast of England, intensifying through June 1940. Thereafter, the Luftwaffe concentrated on Royal Air Force sites in the South of England, with occasional raids on the North East, such as the period 12–15 August.

On 15 August, in the belief that the defences of NE England had been denuded, Luftflotte 5 attacked across the North Sea from Norway. Some 65 Heinkel He 111 bombers of Kampfgeschwader 26 escorted by 35 Messerschmitt Bf 110 Zerstörer fighters of Zerstörergeschwader 76 were picked up on radar and ambushed by fighters of No. 13 Group RAF before they reached the coast. Those bombers that succeeded in breaking through then split into two groups, one being engaged by the guns of the Tyne GDA the other by the Tees GDA. Bombs were widely scattered and only at Sunderland was any major damage inflicted. KG 26 lost 8 bombers and 7 fighters for no loss to the RAF, in 'one of the most successful air actions of the war'.

On 21 August, the 7th AA Division had its guns distributed as follows:

- Leeds: 20 HAA
- Teesside: 30 HAA
- Tyneside: 50 HAA
- Airfields of No. 13 Group RAF and other VPs: 14 HAA, 62 LAA, 270 LMG
- Mobile: 4 HAA
- S/L: 604

With the bulk of the fighting occurring further south, the mobile guns soon moved out of the division's area.

In September 1940, the 7th AA Division formed the 7th AA Z Regiment equipped with rocket projectors.

== The Blitz ==
The Battle of Britain was followed by the Luftwaffe's night Blitz on London and other industrial cities during the winter of 1940–41. Again, NE England escaped the worst of this, but hundreds of people died during the Newcastle Blitz and there were notable air raids on Tyneside on 9 April and Sunderland on 25 April.

AA Command was now reaching its peak strength, and there was considerable reorganisation in November 1940. The 31st and 39th AA Brigades transferred to a new 10th AA Division covering Yorkshire and Humberside, and the 7th AA Division came under the command of III Anti-Aircraft Corps. The 30th AA Brigade was covering Tyneside and the 43rd AA Brigade covering Teesside, while the 57th LAA Brigade had become primarily a searchlight rather than LAA gun formation.

=== Order of Battle 1940–41 ===
The 3rd AA Division had the following composition during the Blitz:

30th AA Brigade

- 63rd (Northumbrian) HAA Rgt – see above
- 64th (Northumbrian) HAA Rgt – see above
- 37th (Tyne Electrical Engineers) LAA Rgt – duplicate of the 37th (TEE) S/L Rgt, see above
- 38th LAA Rgt (part) – unit shared with the 10th AA Division
- 68rd LAA Rgt– new unit raised in December 1940
- 7th AA Z Rgt – see above

43rd AA Brigade

- 8th (Belfast) HAA Rgt – returned from Dunkirk and re-equipped
- 73rd HAA Rgt – returned from Dunkirk and re-equipped
- 50th LAA Rgt – new unit raised in July 1940
- 72nd LAA Rgt – new unit raised in January 1941
- 47th (Durham Light Infantry) S/L Rgt – see above
- 55th (Durham Light Infantry) S/L Rgt – see above

57th AA Brigade

- 41st LAA Rgt – new unit raised in January 1941
- 46th (Lincolnshire Regiment) S/L Rgt – see above
- 53rd (Royal Northumberland Fusiliers) S/L Rgt – see above
- 7th AA Divisional Signals, RCS
- 7th AA Divisional RASC
  - 907th and 923rd Companies
- 7th AA Divisional Company, Royal Army Medical Corps
- 7th AA Divisional Workshop Company, RAOC

In 1941, the 7th Divisional Signals became a 'Mixed' unit, indicating that women of the Auxiliary Territorial Service (ATS) were fully integrated into the unit.

== Mid-War ==
The main Blitz ended in May 1941, but occasional raids continued. Newly formed AA units joined the division, the HAA and support units increasingly being 'mixed'. At the same time, experienced units were posted away for service overseas. This led to a continual turnover of units, which accelerated in 1942 with the preparations for the invasion of North Africa (Operation Torch) and the need to transfer AA units to counter the Baedeker Blitz and the Luftwaffe's hit-and-run attacks against South Coast towns. In August 1942, the 3rd AA Division was sent to the South Coast and the 7th AA Division took over command of the 36th (Scottish) AA Brigade covering Edinburgh and the Forth.

During the Baedeker raids in 1942, Middlesbrough and Billingham received two successive raids on the nights of 6 and 7 July, and another on 25 July. Sunderland was raided on 6 September, but most of the bombs fell wide of their targets. There were also lone raiders, such as the Dornier bomber that hit Middlesbrough railway station on August Bank Holiday 1942.

=== Order of Battle 1941–42 ===
During this period, the division was composed as follows:

30th AA Brigade

- 63rd (Northumbrian) HAA Rgt – left for War Office Control December 1941 preparatory to embarking for Ceylon
- 64th (Northumbrian) HAA Rgt – left April 1942 preparatory to joining Operation Torch
- 135th (Mixed) HAA Rgt – new unit raised in October 1941
- 136th HAA Rgt – joined from the 2nd AA Division April 1942; returned June 1942
- 146th HAA Rgt – new unit raised in January 1942; left May 1942
- 153rd (Mixed) HAA Rgt – new unit raised in March 1942
- 37th (TEE) LAA Rgt – left for Middle East June 1941
- 50th LAA Rgt – left for the 6th AA Division February 1942
- 68th LAA Rgt – to the 43rd AA Brigade by May 1942; left June 1942
- 124th (Highland) LAA Rgt – converted from the 51st S/L Rgt and joined May 1942
- 7th AA Z Rgt – to the 43rd AA Brigade February 1942

43rd AA Brigade

- 8th (Belfast) HAA Rgt – left for GHQ Reserve November 1941 preparatory to embarking for India
- 73rd HAA Rgt – left for the 12th AA Division May 1941
- 72nd LAA Rgt – left for 3rd AA Division Summer 1941
- 123rd HAA Rgt – new unit raised in February 1941
- 145th (Mixed) HAA Rgt – new unit raised in January, joined April 1942
- 31st LAA Rgt – joined from Orkney and Shetland Defences June 1942; left for the 6th AA Division June 1942
- 41st LAA Rgt – left for War Office Control April 1942 preparatory to embarking for Middle East
- 136th LAA Rgt – ''new unit raised in February 1942; joined June 1942
- 53rd (RNF) S/L Rgt – to the 30th AA Brigade August 1942

57th AA Brigade

- 46th (Lincolnshire) S/L Rgt – left for the 3rd AA Division December 1941
- 47th (DLI) S/L Rgt – left for conversion to 122nd LAA Rgt February 1942
- 55th (DLI) S/L Rgt – left for conversion to 113th LAA Rgt January 1942
- 56th (5th Bn Cameronians (Scottish Rifles)) S/L Rgt – joined from the 3rd AA Division December 1941; left for conversion to 125th LAA Rgt March 1942

(The brigade had no units under command from March to May 1942)

- 60th (City of London) HAA Rgt – joined from the 12th AA Division May 1942; left June 1942
- 100th HAA Rgt – joined from the 12th AA Division May 1942; left June 1942
- 155th (Mixed) HAA Rgt – new unit raised in March 1942; joined May, left for the 12th AA Division August 1942
- 134th LAA Rgt – joined from the 4th AA Division August 1942
- 4th AA Z Rgt – joined from the 4th AA Division August 1942

36th (Scottish) Anti-Aircraft Brigade covering Edinburgh and the Firth of Forth – joined from the 3rd AA Division August 1942

- 114th HAA Rgt
- 129th (Mixed) HAA Rgt
- 158th (Mixed) HAA Rgt
- 135th LAA Rgt

The increased sophistication of Operations Rooms and communications was reflected in the growth in support units, which attained the following organisation by May 1942:

- 7th AA Division Mixed Signal Unit HQ, RCS
  - HQ No 1 Company
    - 7th AA Division Mixed Signal Office Section
    - 405th AA Gun Operations Room Mixed Signal Section
    - 15th AA Sub-Gun Operations Room Mixed Signal Sub-Section
    - 16th AA Sub-Gun Operations Room Mixed Signal Sub-Section
    - 17th AA Sub-Gun Operations Room Mixed Signal Sub-Section
    - 30th AA Brigade Signal Office Mixed Sub-Section
    - 201st RAF Fighter Sector Sub-Section
    - 17th AA Line Maintenance Section
  - HQ No 2 Company
    - 402nd AA Gun Operations Room Mixed Signal Section
    - 5th AA Sub-Gun Operations Room Mixed Signal Sub-Section
    - 6th AA Sub-Gun Operations Room Mixed Signal Sub-Section
    - 43rd AA Brigade Signal Office Mixed Sub-Section
    - 202d RAF Fighter Sector Sub-Section
    - 343rd AA Gun Operations Room Mixed Signal Section
    - 57th AA Brigade Signal Office Mixed Sub-Section
    - 204th RAF Fighter Sector Sub-Section
    - 359th AA Gun Operations Room Mixed Signal Section
    - 18th AA Line Maintenance Section
- HQ 7th AA Div RASC
  - 907th, 923rd Companies
- 7th AA Div RAMC
- 7th AA Div Workshop Company, RAOC
- 7th AA Div Radio Maintenance Company, RAOC

The RAOC companies became part of the new Royal Electrical and Mechanical Engineers (REME) during 1942.

== Disbandment ==
A reorganisation of AA Command in October 1942 saw the AA divisions disbanded and replaced by a number of AA Groups more closely aligned with the groups of RAF Fighter Command. The 7th AA Division was split between the 5th AA Group and the 6th AA Group, with the 7th AA Divisional Signals joining the 6th AA Group (Mixed) Signals.

== General Officer Commanding ==
The following officers commanded the 7th AA Division:

- Major-General Thomas Heywood (23 June 1939 – 9 May 1940)
- Major-General Robert John Younger (10–19 May 1940)
- Major-General Robert Pargiter (3 July–11 November 1940)
- Major-General Eric Fairtlough (12 November 1940 – 18 June 1942)
- Major-General John Slater (19 June–30 September 1942)

== See also ==
- Youtube documentary on bombing of Middlesbrough Railway Station by lone Dornier bomber on August Bank Holiday 3 August 1942.
- List of British Divisions in World War II
