= 31st (North Midland) Anti-Aircraft Brigade =

WW2 British Territorial Army unit

31st (North Midland) Anti-Aircraft Brigade 57 Anti-Aircraft Brigade
- Active: 1 November 1936 – 9 September 1948
- Country: United Kingdom
- Branch: Territorial Army
- Type: Anti-Aircraft Brigade
- Role: Air Defence
- Part of: 2nd AA Division; 7th AA Division; 10th AA Division; 5 AA Group; 21st Army Group
- Garrison/HQ: Retford; York; Tadcaster; Immingham
- Engagements: The Blitz; North West Europe campaign

The 31st (North Midland) Anti-Aircraft Brigade (31 AA Bde) was an air defence formation of Britain's Territorial Army from 1936 until 1948. During the Second World War it defended West Yorkshire and later participated in the North West Europe campaign.

== Origins ==
The formation was raised as 31st (North Midland) Anti-Aircraft Group on 1 November 1936 at Retford forming part of 2nd Anti-Aircraft Division. Its initial order of battle was as follows:

- 66th (Leeds Rifles, The West Yorkshire Regiment) Anti-Aircraft Brigade RA (TA) – Heavy Anti-Aircraft (HAA) unit formed at Leeds in 1936 by conversion of 7th (Leeds Rifles) Battalion, West Yorkshire Regiment
  - HQ Battery
  - 184th, 185th, 197th Anti-Aircraft Batteries
  - 186th Anti-Aircraft Battery (at Oulton)
- 67th (The York and Lancaster Regiment) Anti-Aircraft Brigade RA (TA) – HAA unit formed at Rotherham in 1936 by conversion of 5th Battalion, York and Lancaster Regiment
  - HQ Battery
  - 187th, 188th, 189th, 198th Anti-Aircraft Batteries
- 43rd (The Duke of Wellington's Regiment) Anti-Aircraft Battalion, RE (TA) – Searchlight unit formed at Huddersfield in 1936 by conversion of 5th Battalion, Duke of Wellington's Regiment
  - HQ Company
  - 370th, 371st, 372nd, 373rd Anti-Aircraft Companies
- 46th (The Lincolnshire Regiment) Anti-Aircraft Battalion, RE (TA) – Searchlight unit formed at Grimsby in 1936 by conversion of 5th Battalion, Lincolnshire Regiment
  - HQ Company
  - 382nd, 383rd, 384th, 385th Anti-Aircraft Companies

Brigadier Frederick Hyland, MC, was appointed to command 31 AA Brigade at the time of its creation on 1 November 1936. He was promoted to major-general and took command of the new 6 AA Division on 30 May 1939. By then the brigade's HQ was at 7 Park Street, York.

In 1938 the RA replaced its traditional unit designation 'Brigade' by the modern 'Regiment', which allowed the 'AA Groups' to take the more usual formation title of 'Brigades'. Anti-Aircraft Command was formed in April 1939 to control all the TA's AA units and formations. 31st AA Bde transferred to the new 7th Anti-Aircraft Division when that was formed in Newcastle in June 1939. As AA Command continued to expand, existing units moved to other brigades and were replaced by newly formed units.

== Second World War ==
=== Mobilisation ===
On the outbreak of war 31 AA Bde was based at York and was mobilised to defend West Yorkshire, with the following order of battle:

- 66th (Leeds Rifles) AA Regt RA – as above
- 96th AA Regt RA – HAA unit formed in 1939
  - HQ and 294 Btys at Castleford
  - 186 Bty at Oulton from 66 AA Regt
  - 287 Bty at Pontefract
  - 295 and 296 Btys at Halifax
- 43rd (5 DOW) AA Bn RE – as above
- 49th (West Yorkshire Regiment) AA Bn RE – Searchlight unit formed at Bradford in 1937 by conversion of 6th Bn West Yorkshire Regiment
  - HQ, 395, 396, 397, 398 Coys at Bradford
- 31st Anti-Aircraft Brigade Company Royal Army Service Corps

On 23 September 1939, responsibility for the Humber Gun Zone (including 30 HAA guns manned by 62nd (Northumbrian) and 91st HAA Rgts) was transferred to 31 AA Bde from 39 AA Bde but reverted to 39 AA Bde and 2 AA Division in May 1940.

During the Phoney War period, AA Command was desperate for men and equipment to meet its huge commitments. When the War Office released the first intakes of Militiamen to the Command in early 1940, most were found to be in low physical categories and without training. 31 AA Bde reported that out of 1000 recruits sent for duty, '50 had to be discharged immediately because of serious medical defects, another 20 were judged to be mentally deficient and a further 18 were unfit to do any manual labour such as lifting ammunition'. Fitness and training was greatly improved by the time Britain's AA defences were seriously tested during the Battle of Britain and Blitz.

In 1940, RA regiments equipped with 3-inch or 3.7-inch AA guns were designated Heavy Anti-Aircraft (HAA) to distinguish them from the new Light Anti-Aircraft (LAA) regiments, and RE AA battalions were transferred to the RA and designated Searchlight regiments.

=== Battle of Britain and Blitz ===
During The Blitz, 31 AA Bde remained responsible for AA defence of the West Yorkshire towns and cities, and was transferred to a new 10th AA Division (covering Yorkshire and northern Lincolnshire) on 1 November 1940. At this period it was composed of LAA and S/L units, but HAA units rejoined later.

==== Order of Battle 1940–41 ====
Formation sign of 10 AA Division, worn 1940–42

31 AA Brigade's composition during the Blitz was as follows:

- 87th HAA Rgt – joined by May 1941; operationally under 7 AA Div; left brigade June 1941; later to Eighth Army
  - 278, 279, 280 HAA Btys
- 38th LAA Rgt (part) – to 2 AA Division by May 1941
  - 51, 124, 125, 230 LAA Btys
- 71st LAA Rgt – raised January 1941
  - 210, 211, 216 LAA Btys
- 43rd (DoW) S/L Rgt
  - 370, 371, 372, 373 S/L Btys
- 49th (West Yorkshire Regiment) S/L Rgt
  - 395, 496, 397, 398 S/L Btys
- 54th (1/5th Bn Durham Light Infantry) S/L Rgt
  - 411, 412, 413, 547 S/L Btys

=== Mid-War ===
The Blitz is held to have ended in mid-May 1941, but periodic raids continued against the industrial towns of Northern England. On 28 April 1942 the Luftwaffe carried out one of its so-called Baedeker raids very accurately on York.

On 30 September 1942 the AA Divisions and Corps were dissolved and a new 5 AA Group assumed responsibility for North-East England, including 31 AA Bde. Newly formed AA units joined the brigade, the HAA units increasingly being 'mixed' ones into which women of the Auxiliary Territorial Service were integrated. At the same time, experienced units were posted away for service overseas.

==== Order of Battle 1941–43 ====
During this period the brigade was composed as follows (temporary attachments omitted):

- 12th HAA Rgt – from War Office (WO) Reserve August 1942'
  - 4, 18, 203, 249 HAA Btys
- 128th HAA Rgt – from 62 AA Bde August 1942; to 2 AA Group November 1942'
  - 287, 309, 407, 436 HAA Btys
- 182nd (Mixed) HAA Rgt – new regiment formed October 1942; to 57 AA Bde May 1943
  - 588, 592, 594 (M) HAA Btys
  - 615 (M) HAA Rgt - joined March 1943
- 71st LAA Rgt – to 65 AA Bde June 1942'
  - 192 LAA Bty – from 64th LAA Rgt Autumn 1941; to 134th LAA Rgt April 1942
  - 210, 211, 262 LAA Btys
  - 464 LAA Bty – new battery joined February 1942
- 114th LAA Rgt – from 4 AA Division May 1942; left form mobile training October 1942
  - 372, 373, 374, 375 LAA Btys
- 142nd LAA Rgt – new regiment formed October 1942; to 50 AA Bde April 1943
  - 374 LAA Bty – from 114th LAA Rgt
  - 398, 465, 483 LAA Btys
- 30th (Surrey) S/L Rgt – from 5 AA Division October 1941; to 11 AA Division January 1942
  - 318, 323, 567 S/L Btys
- 41st (5th North Staffordshire Regiment) S/L Rgt – from 57 AA Bde May 1943
  - 363, 364, 365 S/L Btys
- 42nd (Robin Hoods, Sherwood Foresters) S/L Rgt – from 57 AA Bde May 1943
  - 366, 367, 368, 569 S/L Btys
- 43rd S/L Rgt – to 32 (Midland) AA Bde March 1943
  - 370, 372, 373 S/L Btys
  - 371 S/L Bty – to 60th S/L Rgt January 1942
- 49th S/L Rgt
  - 395, 396, 398 S/L Btys
  - 397 S/L Bty – to 63rd S/L Rgt January 1942
- 54th (1/5th DLI) S/L Rgt
  - 411, 412, 413 S/L Btys
  - 547 S/L Bty – to 51st (Highland) S/L Rgt January 1942
- 17 AA 'Z' Regiment – new regiment equipped with Z Battery rocket projectiles formed October 1942; to 57 AA Bde May 1943
  - 170, 206, 207, 212 AA 'Z' Btys
  - 225 AA 'Z' Bty – joined January 1943

==== Order of Battle 1943–44 ====
By August 1943, 31 AA Bde was a purely searchlight formation, with the following order of battle:

- 41st (5NSR) S/L Rgt – as above
- 42nd (Robin Hoods) S/L Rgt
  - 366, 367, 368 S/L Btys
  - 369 S/L Boy – disbanded February 1944
- 49th (WYR) S/L Rgt – as above
- 54th (1/5th DLI) S/L Rgt – as above

=== North West Europe ===
21st Army Group formation sign

Early in 1944, 31 AA Bde under the command of Brigadier E. Coley was earmarked for overseas service with 21st Army Group in Operation Overlord. Between training, field force AA units were loaned back to AA Command, and 31 AA Bde retained its responsibilities under 5 AA Group. At the time the brigade was headquartered at Tadcaster, later at nearby Newton Kyme, in North Yorkshire as part of 5 AA Group with the following searchlight units under command:

- 41st (5NSR) S/L Rgt
- 42nd (Robin Hoods) S/L Rgt
- 54th (1/5th Bn DLI) Searchlight Regiment, Royal Artillery – as above
- 64th (Essex Regiment) S/L Rgt, later replaced by 58th (Middlesex) S/L Rgt – both remained in the UK and converted to garrison units

The regiments re-equipped their AA LMG sections with twin Browning machine guns and carried out 'Bullseye' exercises over North East England with the Night fighters of No. 264 Squadron RAF. On 15 April, 41 S/L Rgt received orders to mobilise for overseas service, followed on 1 June by 31 Bde HQ and 42 and 58 S/L Rgts. 31 Brigade HQ moved to its concentration area at Addlestone in Surrey and came under the orders of 21st Army Group on 21 June (D + 15). However, embarkation would not follow for several months, during which the HQ staff had to undergo three weeks of Battle Training at Perranporth in Cornwall, and then run S/L training in Wiltshire.

No. 85 Group RAF was responsible for night-fighter cover of the beachhead and bases in Normandy, and was keen to have searchlight assistance in the same way as Fighter Command had in the UK. A detailed plan was made in advance to have a belt of S/L positions deployed from Caen to the Cherbourg peninsula. This required nine S/L batteries of 24 lights, spaced at 6000 yard intervals, six rows deep. Each battery area was to have an orbit beacon, around which up to four fighters would be positioned at varying heights. These would be allocated by fighter controllers, and the S/Ls would assist by illuminating targets and indicating raid approaches, while area boundaries would be marked by vertical S/Ls. Six S/L regiments were specially trained for this work under 31 and 50 AA Bdes. In practice, most of this was never implemented, liaison with the US Army units around Cherbourg having proved problematical. In the end, only 41 S/L Regt and the Royal Corps of Signals section of 42 S/L Rgt deployed along the western part of the layout planned by 85 Group, and came under US command. Later they deployed along the River Seine

The Brigade HQ finally landed at Arromanches on 2 October, and was not allocated an operational role. The brigade proceeded to Brussels, where it was given the task of setting up a practice camp for training operators on the new Mk VIII centimetric Searchlight Control (SLC or 'Elsie') radar. It was also ordered to begin trials on SLC radar for tracking enemy mortar fire. 41 S/L regiment had been detached from the brigade and was employed in the 'Anti-Diver' role against V-1 flying bombs heading towards Antwerp, while 42 S/L Rgt was under US command in Antwerp itself, and 54 S/L Rgt was still training in England. This meant that apart from its Signals and Royal Electrical and Mechanical Engineers sections, the only troops under the brigade's command were a detachment of 41 S/L Rgt personnel attached for the counter-mortar trials. On 18 November a premature explosion while firing a captured German 81 mm mortar killed 5 men (including 3 from 41 S/L) and wounded four men of 41 S/L. Lieutenant Gilbert Rabbetts of 41 S/L 'acted with great gallantry, rapidly removing wounded to hospital, though himself badly wounded' and was later awarded the MBE.

Early in 1945, in preparation for the forthcoming offensive in the Klever Reichswald (Operation Veritable), 31 AA Bde carried out experiments in Belgium to optimise 'artificial moonlight' techniques whereby S/L units provided lighting for night movement of ground troops, for floodlighting their objectives and for dazzling the defenders.

HQ 31 AA Bde remained with Second Army until the end of the war in Europe. In April 1945 it was commanding the occupation troops and coast defences of the Friesland area, with 64 (Northumbrian) HAA Regt (recently returned from supporting operations on the Yugoslav coast) under command as infantry.

== Postwar ==
When the TA was reformed in 1947, 31 AA Bde was renumbered as 57 AA Bde, (Note: The TA AA brigades were now numbered 51 and upwards, rather than 26 and upwards as in the 1930s; the wartime 57 AA Bde was disbanded in 1945.) with its HQ at Immingham, and the following order of battle:

- 462 (Northumbrian) HAA Regt – former 62nd HAA Rgt (see above) at Hull
- 491 HAA Regt – former 91st HAA Rgt (see above) at Harrogate
- 581 HAA Regt – former 46th S/L Regt (see above) at Scunthorpe
- 529 LAA Regt – at Grimsby
- 539 LAA Regt – at Lincoln

However, the brigade was disbanded by 27 September 1948.

AA Command was disbanded and the air defence of the UK was reorganised in 1955. A new 31 AA Bde was formed as a TA HQ from the Regular Army's 8 AA Bde, based at Gosforth. It was disbanded in 1961.

== External sources ==
- British Military History
- British Army units from 1945 on
- Generals of World War II
- Orbat.com
- Orders of Battle at Patriot Files
- The Royal Artillery 1939–45
