= Newcastle Blitz =

Bombing raids during WWII

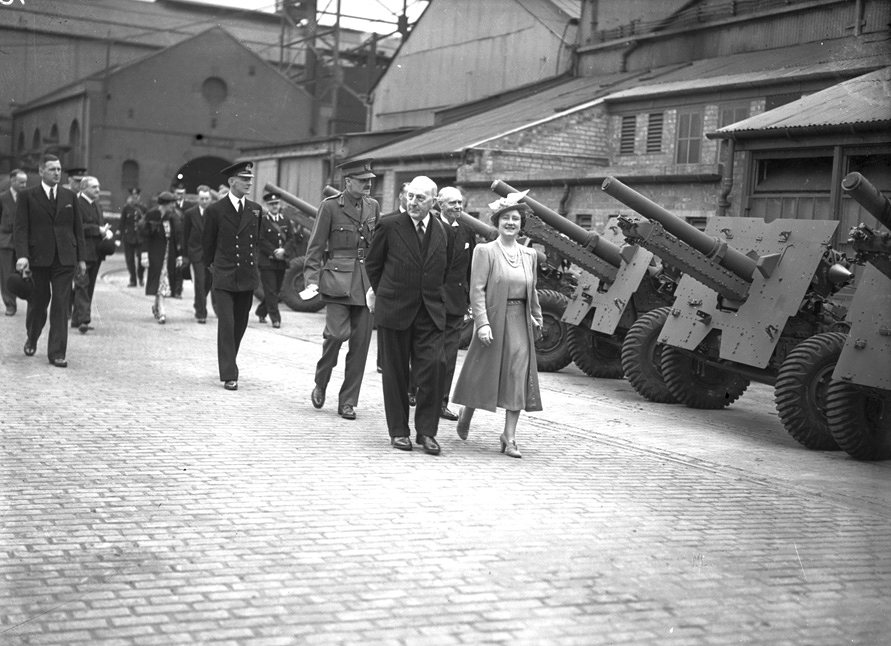
- Visit to Elswick Works by King George VI and Queen Elizabeth, 18 June 1941; Newcastle's vast industry was a strategic target of German bombers (photo from Tyne & Wear Archives & Museums)
Date	1940–1942
Location	Newcastle-Upon-Tyne

Belligerents
Nazi Germany	United Kingdom

Casualties and losses
Unknown	~400

The Newcastle Blitz refers to the strategic bombing of Newcastle upon Tyne, England by the Nazi German Luftwaffe during the second world war. Close to 400 people were killed between July 1940 and December 1941 during bombing raids on the city.

== Strategic target ==
As part of the Führer's War Directive No. 9, Newcastle, north Tyneside, Wearside and Teesside in north-east England were deemed important targets. The areas had important heavy industry including shipbuilding and busy docks sending coal to London and the south and there were also major railway connections to Scotland. Targets included the Tyne river bridges, the docks, Elswick steelworks, Swan Hunter's shipyard, Vickers Armstrong "Naval Yard" and Wallsend slipway.

Following the declaration of war against Germany in September 1939, over 30,000 people, mainly children, were evacuated from the city to areas including the Lake District and rural Northumberland.

== Bombing raids ==
=== 1940 ===
The first major raid on Newcastle and neighbouring Gateshead came on 2 July 1940. The target was the High Level Bridge and 13 people were killed with a further 123 injured.

Another raid on Newcastle came on 15 August 1940, when German bombers flew from bases in Norway and Denmark (heading for airfields). Though much of the attacking force was intercepted by British fighters a number of bombers dropped bombs on Newcastle and Sunderland.

=== 1941 ===
On 25 April 1941, a force of German bombers attacked Newcastle and dropped high explosive bombs, incendiaries and a parachute mine. 47 were killed and dozens of homes were left uninhabitable.

A raid on 1 September 1941 caused a major fire New Bridge Street Goods Station which burned for a week. The raid left 50 dead, 71 seriously injured, 140 slightly injured and over a thousand people homeless.

The last substantial raid on Newcastle came on 29 December 1941 with nine people killed in the Byker area. Smaller scale 'tip and run' raids by small groups or single bombers continued for the next two years.

Another air raid came for North Shields as W.A. Wilkinsons (used as an air raid shelter) was hit.

Newcastle, like other English cities and large towns at the time, had been expanding rapidly throughout the 1920s and 1930s with new housing being built in the private sector, as well as new council housing to replace inner city slums. The damage to its housing stock caused in the Newcastle Blitz led to an acceleration in housebuilding across Tyneside after the war was over.
