= 82nd (Essex) Heavy Anti-Aircraft Regiment, Royal Artillery =

82nd (Essex) HAA Regiment, RA 482nd (Essex) HAA Regiment, RA
- Cap Badge of the Royal Artillery (pre-1953)
- Active: 1 October 1938 – 10 March 1955
- Country: United Kingdom
- Branch: Territorial Army
- Role: Air defence
- Size: Regiment
- Garrison/HQ: Barking, London
- Engagements: Norwegian Campaign; Defence of Gibraltar; Operation Diver

82nd (Essex) Heavy Anti-Aircraft Regiment, Royal Artillery, was a volunteer air defence unit of Britain's Territorial Army (TA) from 1938 until 1955. During World War II it served in the Norwegian Campaign, defended Gibraltar and the D-Day invasion ports, and took part in Operation Diver against the V-1 flying bombs.

== Origin ==
The regiment was formed in Essex 1 October 1938 as part of the expansion of Britain's anti-aircraft (AA) defences in the period of tension before World War II. 82nd AA Brigade (like all Royal Artillery (RA) AA brigades it was redesignated as a 'regiment' on 1 January 1939), and it gained its 'Essex' subtitle the following year) comprised a regimental headquarters (RHQ) at Barking and three batteries:

- 156 (Barking) AA Battery at Barking; transferred from 52nd (London) AA Regiment, one of the first TA AA regiments, raised in 1922
- 193 AA Battery at Leigh-on-Sea; transferred from 59th (Essex Regiment) AA Regiment, itself converted from 7th Battalion Essex Regiment in 1935
- 256 (Barking) AA Battery newly-raised at Barking

The regiment was under the command of Brevet Colonel G. Shenstone, formerly of the 7th Bn Essex Regiment. Its Essex subtitle was added in July 1939

== World War II ==
=== Mobilisation ===
In February 1939 the existing AA defences came under the control of a new Anti-Aircraft Command. In June a partial mobilisation of TA units was begun in a process known as 'couverture', whereby each AA unit did a month's tour of duty in rotation to man selected AA gun and searchlight positions. On 24 August, ahead of the declaration of war, AA Command was fully mobilised at its war stations. 82nd (Essex) AA Regiment formed part of 37th Anti-Aircraft Brigade in 6th AA Division covering South East England.

=== Norway ===
In April 1940, 6 AA Brigade was organised to provide AA cover for the Allied force sent to Norway. 82nd (Essex) AA Regiment, with 24 3.7-inch guns, was selected to join this formation, but like all the other AA units it was short of instruments and towing vehicles.

193 AA Battery of 82nd HAA Rgt, together with a Light AA (LAA) battery, was assigned to 146th Infantry Brigade, which had landed at Namsos 16–18 April as part of 'Mauriceforce'. However, only the first LAA guns had arrived by 29 April, when it was decided to evacuate the heavily-bombed infantry.

For the main attack on Narvik, AA guns were landed at Harstad, an island base just outside Narvikfjord with an anchorage, and an airstrip at Skånland on the opposite coast. Initial AA defence was provided by LAA guns, joined in May by 193/82nd HAA Bty with eight 3.7-inch guns. To enable the RAF to operate fighters, these guns were to be based at Bardufoss Air Station on the mainland, a remote site where packed ice had to be blasted clear before the guns could be emplaced. A small supply port was established for the Bardufoss force at Sørreisa, near Tromsø. 6 AA Brigade had to provide AA defence for all these sites, and for a blocking force to be put ashore at Bodo on the mainland to the south. In addition, the French combat groups along Narvikfjord were being strafed and needed AA cover.

When the rest of 82nd AA Rgt arrived on 10 May, Brigade HQ allocated one battery to Bardufoss and another to Tromsø and Sorreisa. (The four guns at Tromsø, the temporary seat of the Norwegian government, represented the furthest northward British deployment.) These deployments were gradually carried out during May. All movements had to be carried out along steep narrow roads banked with six feet of snow, or on boats that could not take a 3.7-inch gun. The Luftwaffe concentrated its air attacks on the AA defences. With high mountains and low cloud, early warning cover was poor, with just a single RAF radar post on the Lofoten Islands, and the Army AA units had to rely on radar-equipped warships, which provided most of the AA cover in Narvikfjord.

Bardufoss Airfield opened on 21 May and the final assault on Narvik by French, Polish and Norwegian troops began on 27 May. However, immediately after its capture, orders were received to destroy the port and evacuate to the UK. (The British Expeditionary Force was simultaneously being evacuated from Dunkirk). To cover the evacuation, AA units were ordered to maintain maximum activity and especially to prevent reconnaissance overflights. A the same time, 6 AA Bde was ordered by London to recover its 3.7-inch and 40mm Bofors guns as a matter of priority. This was done by progressively thinning out defences, and the brigade was able to assemble from the outlying positions 22 Bofors and five HAA guns at Hardstad, with a number of predictors and heightfinders. Although much of the force's equipment was saved, the AA guns were kept in action until 6 June to cover the evacuation. and many had to be abandoned when the last troopship left on 8 June.

=== Gibraltar ===
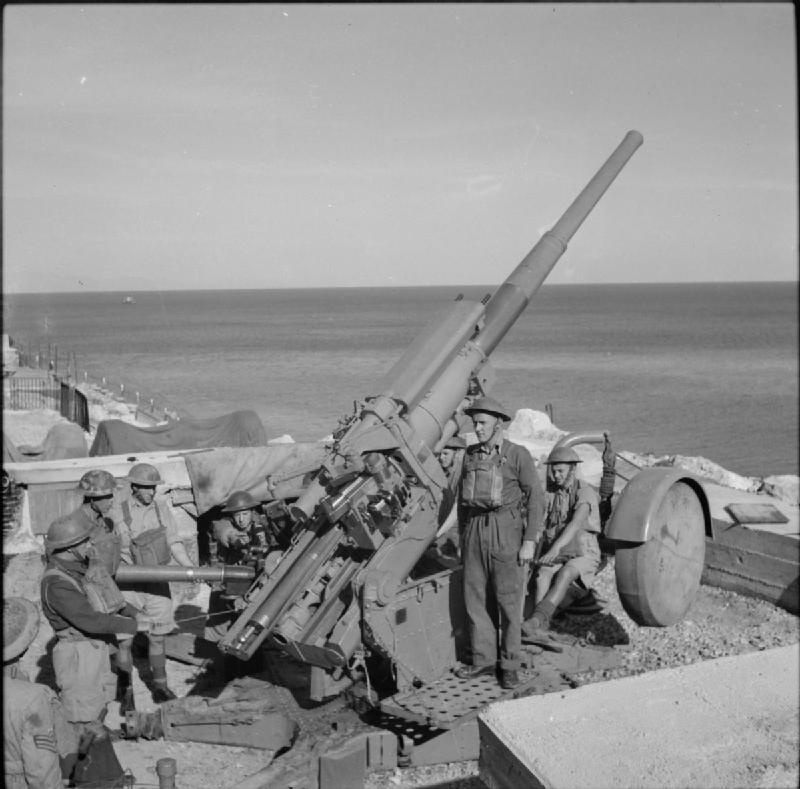
Mobile 3.7-inch HAA gun deployed at White Rock Battery, November 1941

AA units returning from France and Norway were rapidly reinforced, re-equipped where possible, and redeployed for future integration into existing defence plans. On 1 June, those AA regiments equipped with 3-inch guns or the newer 3.7-inch were termed Heavy Anti-Aircraft (HAA) to distinguish them from the new Light Anti-Aircraft (LAA) units being formed. 82nd (Essex) HAA Regiment was re-equipped with 16 x 3.7-inch guns, 8 x Bofors guns and GL Mk I gun-laying radar, and was then sent aboard the SS City of Cairo to reinforce the defences of Gibraltar.

On the outbreak of war in September 1939 there had only been two batteries (9 and 19 AA Btys) manning the totally inadequate AA defences of Gibraltar, which consisted of four old 3-inch guns and four new 3.7-inch guns, spread in two-gun sections to give the widest possible coverage, and two of the new Bofors 40 mm guns to protect the Royal Navy Dockyard, with the assistance of Royal Navy (RN) 2-pounder pom-pom guns. 10th AA Rgt was formed in December 1939 to command 9 and 19 AA Btys and train the AA Section of the new Gibraltar Defence Force (GDF), which took over the 3-inch guns. Apart from occasional shots fired at unidentified aircraft penetrating Gibraltar's airspace, there were no attacks on the fortress during the 'Phoney war' period.

After the Fall of France, a group of AA detachments under 53rd (City of London) AA Rgt escaped from Marseille aboard the SS Alma Dawson. A French dockyard strike prevented them from loading any of their 3-inch guns or vehicles, but they mounted Bofors guns on the ship's deck and put to sea on 18 June. On arrival in Gibraltar they reinforced 10th AA Rgt. 82nd (Essex) AA Regiment arrived on 27 June, and once it had unloaded its guns and equipment 53rd AA Rgt re-embarked for home.

There followed a reorganisation of the AA units in Gibraltar: 19 AA Bty joined 82nd AA Rgt, together with the GDF HAA battery, while 9 AA Bty took over all the Bofors guns. A searchlight battery arrived, and an AA Operations Room (AAOR) was established to control all the gunsites and to coordinate with AA-equipped ships in the harbour. 10th AA Rgt HQ was ordered to be transferred to Malta in July, but this did not occur until November when, as part of Operation Coat, a reinforcement convoy for Malta put in at Gibraltar and picked it up.

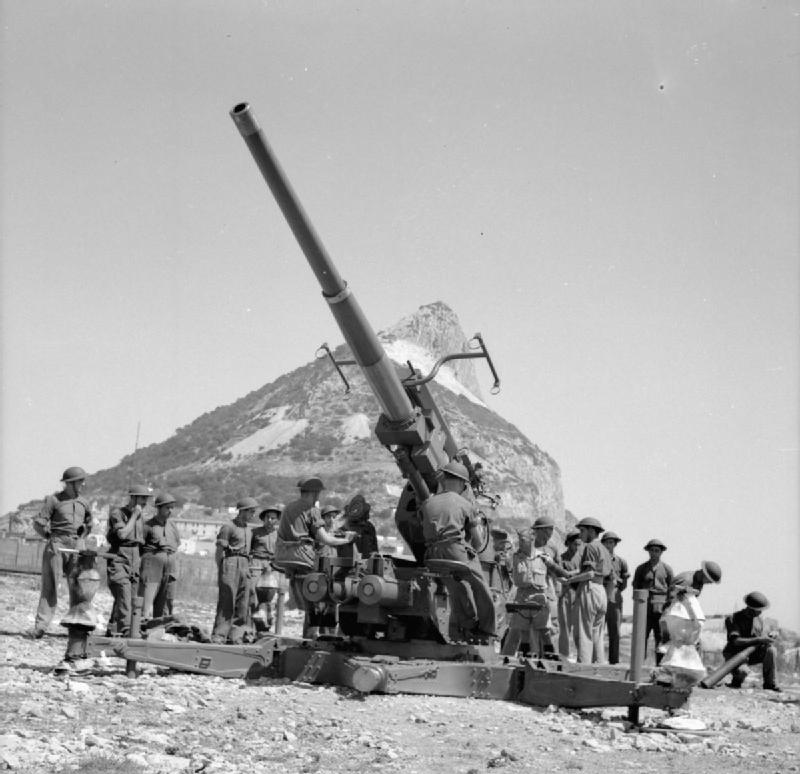
The Gibraltar Defence Force training on a 3.7-inch gun

The first serious air raid on Gibraltar came at 02.00 on 18 July, when two unidentified aircraft bombed the slopes of the Rock, causing some fatalities. The attack was thought to be by the Vichy French Air Force in retaliation for the British attack on the French fleet at Mers-el-Kebir on 3 July (Operation Catapult), which had been carried out by Force H from Gibraltar. On 21 August the AA defences brought down a Savoia-Marchetti SM.79 bomber during a raid by the Italian Regia Aeronautica. On 24 and 25 September waves of Vichy bombers attacked Gibraltar again in retaliation for the British and Free French attack on Dakar (Operation Menace), and caused considerable damage. Several of these bombers were shot down by the combined AA fire. On other occasions the guns fired at single Italian reconnaissance aircraft, known to the garrison as 'Persistent Percy'.

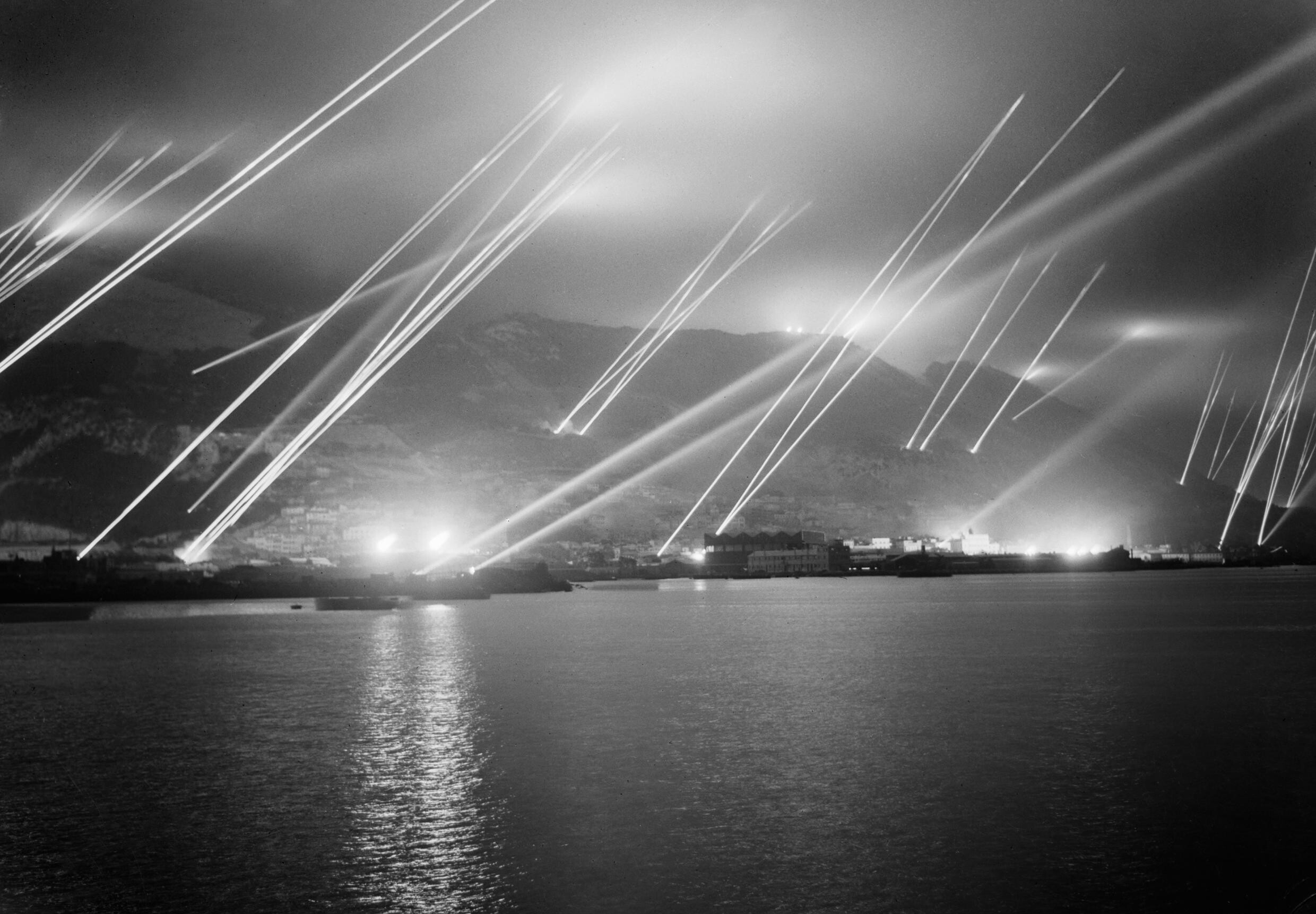
Searchlights over Gibraltar during an air raid practice on 20 November 1942

A new 13th HAA Rgt HQ was formed in Gibraltar in March 1941 to replace the absent 10th and take over the newly-arrived 228 (Edinburgh) HAA Bty and the radar troop. Additional guns and GL radar sets arrived by May, and in September 1941 15 AA Bde HQ was formed to coordinate all AA defences and integrate them into the plans against invasion by sea or land. The revised layout could bring the fire of 20 HAA guns to bear on a target approaching at a speed of 240 mph from any direction at a typical height of 12,000 feet. Each AA gunsite was also given an Oerlikon 20 mm cannon for self-defence.

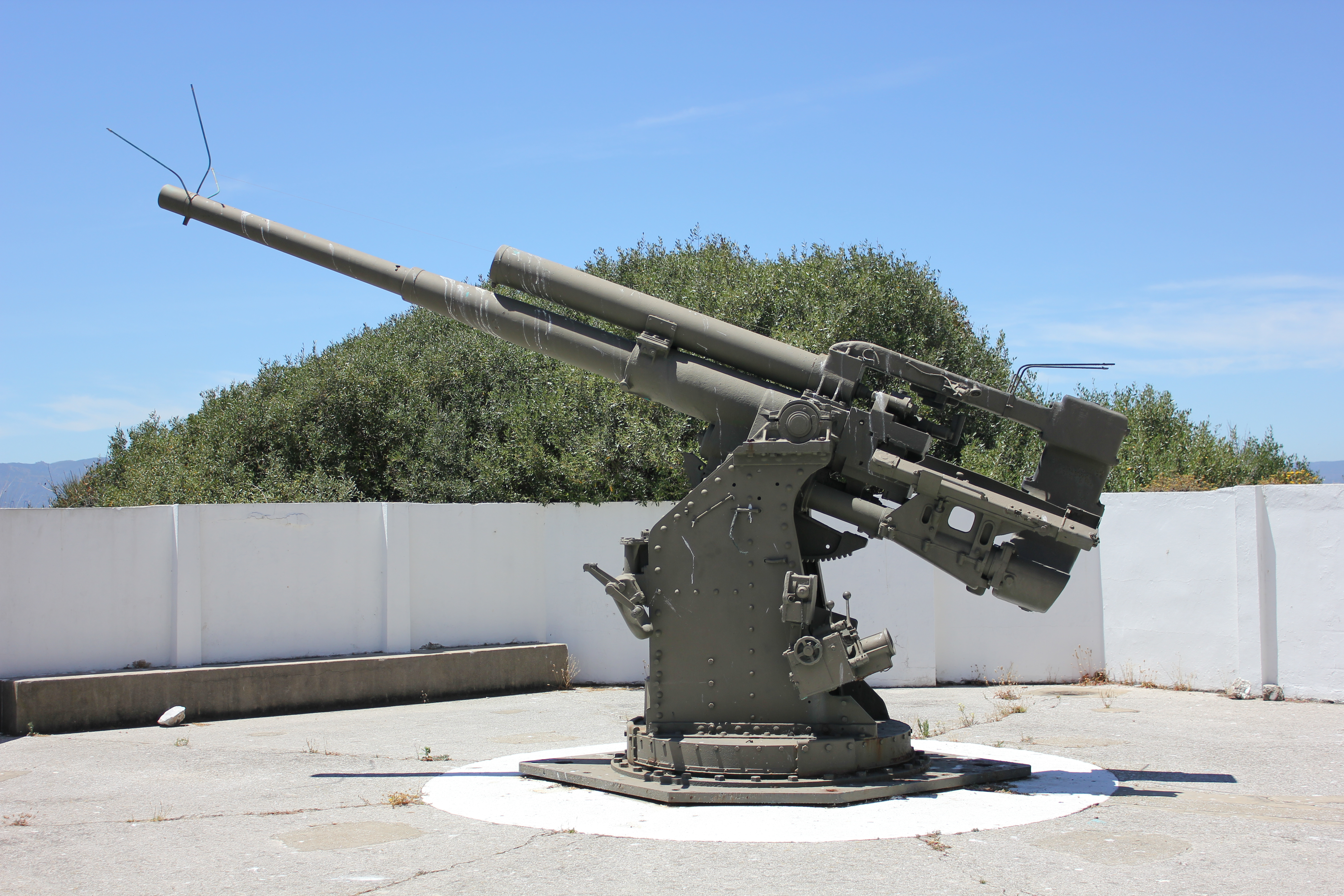
Static 3.7-inch HAA guns preserved at Napier of Magdala Battery, Gibraltar

During 1941 there were five air raids that were positively identified as Vichy French, another six were attributed to Italian aircraft. A total of nine 'kills' were claimed with one 'probable', though the Vichy and Italian HQs announced higher losses than these, so some aircraft probably crashed in Spain or elsewhere. Throughout 1942, raiding was spasmodic and in small strength, most enemy sorties being confined to high level reconnaissance overflights, including German Luftwaffe Junkers Ju 88 and Heinkel He 111 aircraft from March 1942. There were occasional Italian raids on moonlit nights, generally of three Savoia bombers flying at medium height. On 29 June the Royal Air Force early warning radar detected one such raid at a range of 60 miles, which was duly picked up by GL radar as the aircraft turned towards the Rock. One aircraft was illuminated by searchlight and shot down, the others were engaged with barrage fire by the HAA guns and Z battery rockets. Although Gibraltar's North Airfield was bombed and casualties suffered, two more of the hostile raiders were shot down and crashed in Spain.

During the whole of 1942 there were six bombing raids on Gibraltar, two of which were unidentified, and 18 reconnaissance overflights, all but two of them German. Four aircraft were shot down and others crash-landed in Spain. Some of the Italian raids missed their targets and dropped their bombs in Spanish territory, and Spanish AA guns sometimes opened fire as a raid passed towards them. By the end of 1942, the AA defences of Gibraltar reached a peak of scale and efficiency, but the threat had dwindled. There were only two or three reconnaissance flights during 1943. 228 HAA Battery joined the regiment when 13th HAA Rgt HQ was disbanded in November 1942. 175th HAA Rgt (375, 386, 441 HAA Btys) arrived in Gibraltar in May 1943 to relieve 82nd HAA Rgt, which embarked with 156, 193 and 256 HAA Btys on 30 May to return to Home Forces in the UK, leaving 228 HAA Bty with 175th HAA Rgt.

=== Home Defence ===
On return to AA Command, 82nd HAA Rgt joined 35 AA Bde in 2 AA Group covering South East England. It was rejoined by 228 HAA Bty from Gibraltar in October 1943.

Early in 1944, 35 AA Bde came under command of 6 AA Group. This was a headquarters that had been moved from Scotland to the South Coast to take responsibility for the build-up of AA defences in the Solent–Portsmouth area covering embarkation ports for the Allied invasion of Normandy (Operation Overlord). In March 1944, 44 AA Bde HQ moved down from Manchester to join 6 AA Group and take over the AA defences on the Isle of Wight covering the Solent, including 82nd HAA Rgt. Shipping at Portsmouth was bombed on four successive nights (25–28 April) during the 'Baby Blitz' of early 1944, and there were sporadic attacks in May, but these failed to disrupt the 'Overlord' preparations. 82nd HAA Regiment moved in early May to join 60 AA Bde in 3 AA Group, covering the invasion ports on the South West Coast.

=== Operation Diver ===
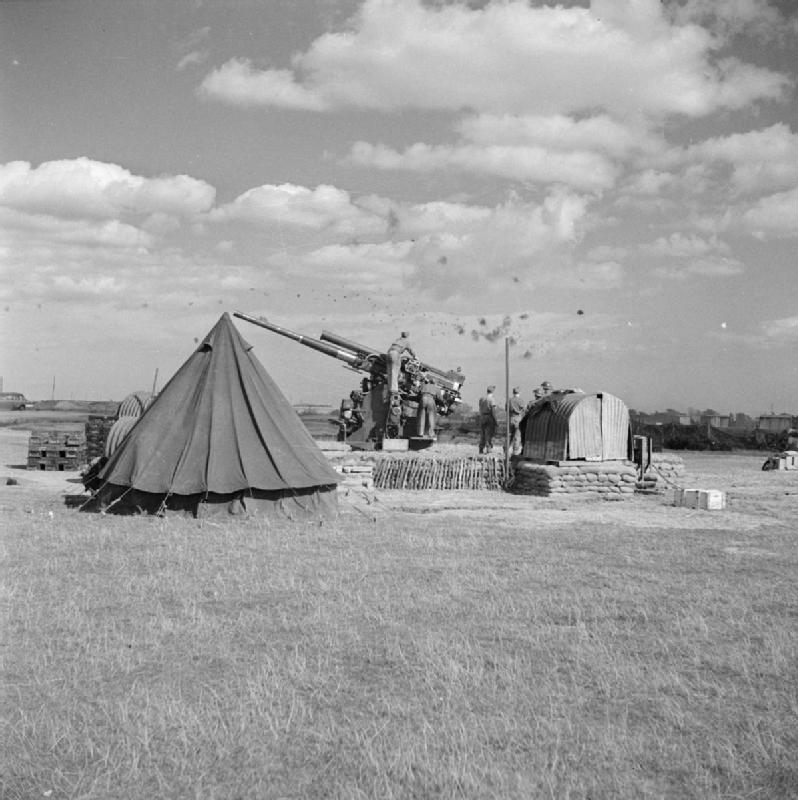
3.7-inch HAA battery in action near London 29 August 1944

The invasion of Normandy was launched on 6 June. A week after D-Day the long-awaited attacks on London by V-1 flying bombs ('Divers') began. AA Command had prepared Operation Diver to counter these weapons, and AA guns were moved from all over the UK to strengthen the 'Diver Belt' in Southern England. In early August 82nd HAA Rgt moved to join 26 (London) AA Bde in 3 AA Group, covering London itself.

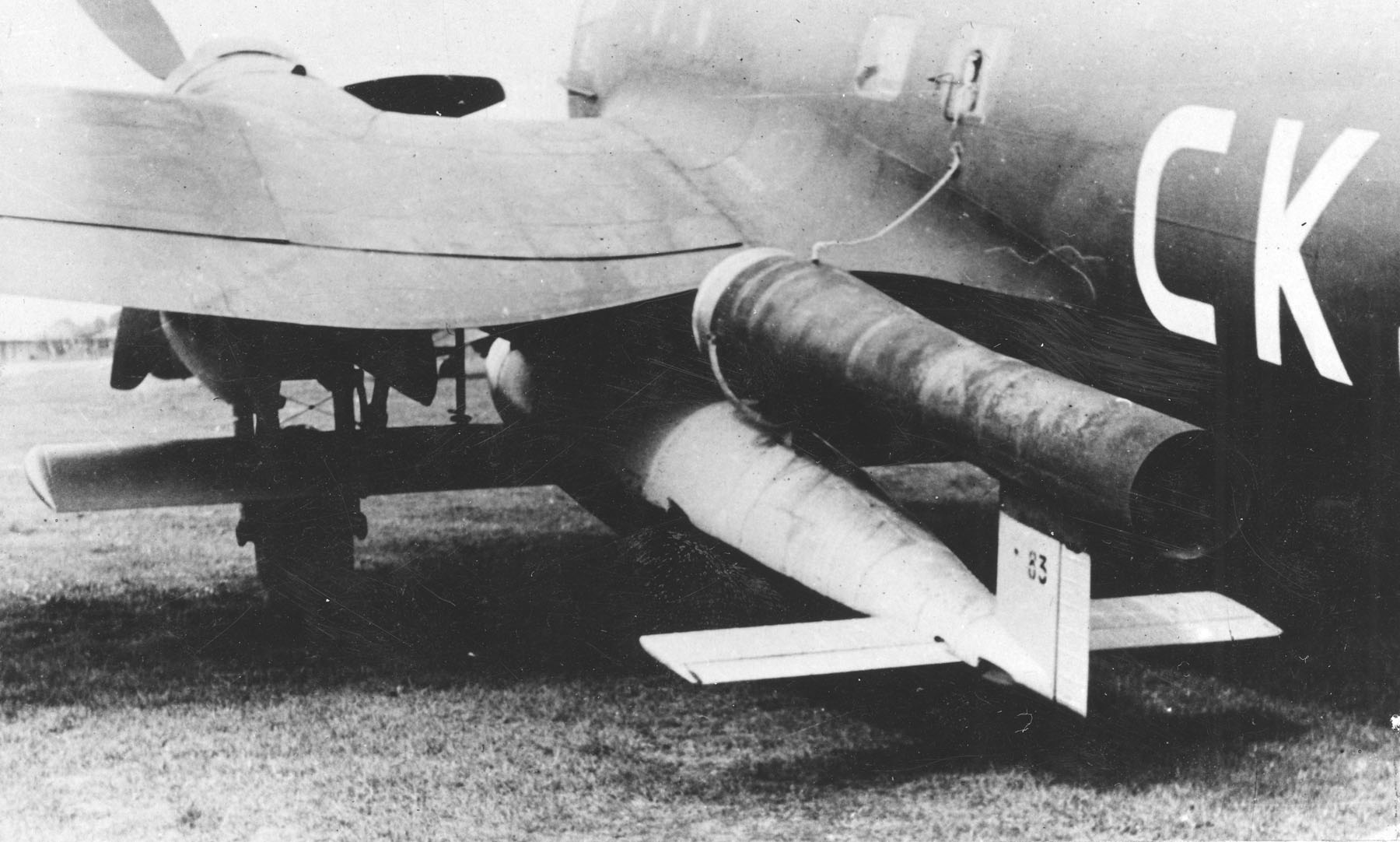
V-1 slung under the wing of a Heinkel He 111 bomber

As 21st Army Group overran the main launch sites in the Pas-de-Calais, the Luftwaffe shifted its focus to air-launching V-1s over the North Sea during the autumn. Once again AA Command redeployed units in response, this time to Eastern England. New HAA sites had to be quickly established, with static guns mounted on ingenious 'Pile Platforms' (named after the commander of AA Command, Sir Frederick Pile) and thousands of huts moved and re-erected to shelter the crews as winter approached. AA Command formed a new 9 AA Group to take over the 'Diver' defences in East Anglia and in early December 1944 82nd HAA Rgt rejoined 37 AA Bde in this group.

AA Command was rapidly wound down after VE Day. By September 1945, 9 AA Group had gone and 37 AA Bde was back in 1 AA Group. 82nd HAA Regiment remained with it, but 228 HAA Bty had transferred within the brigade to 143rd HAA Rgt

== Postwar ==
=== 63 HAA Regiment ===
The war service personnel of 82 HAA Rgt continued under the old regimental and battery numbers until 1 April 1947 when they were redesignated 63 HAA Regiment in the Regular Army with the batteries reorganised as follows:

- 156 HAA Bty disbanded to resuscitate 22 Coast Bty, renumbered as 91 HAA Bty
- 193 HAA Bty disbanded to resuscitate 25 Coast Bty, renumbered as 194 HAA Bty
- 306 HAA Bty disbanded to resuscitate 30 Coast Bty, renumbered as 220 HAA Bty

The regiment was assigned to 11 AA Bde, a Regular brigade in AA Command's 1 AA Group.

This regiment and its batteries were placed in suspended animation at Shoeburyness on 2 June 1955 and officially disbanded on 1 January 1962, except 91 Bty, which later served in 72 LAA Rgt. (Note: There was no connection between this regiment and the wartime 63rd (Northumbrian) HAA Rgt, a TA unit recruited in County Durham and reformed in 1947 as 463 (Durham) HAA Rgt.)

=== 482 (Essex) HAA Regiment ===
The TA regiment was officially placed in suspended animation on 1 January 1947 at South Benfleet in Essex and concurrently reformed as 482 (Mixed) HAA Regiment RA (Essex) at Barking as part of 52 (London) AA Bde ('Mixed' denoting that members of the Women's Royal Army Corps were integrated into the regiment).

The regiment was assigned to 55 (East Anglian) AA Bde in 1 AA Group. However, 55 AA Bde was disbanded the following year, completely disappearing in September 1948.

When AA Command was disbanded in March 1955, there were wholesale mergers among its component units. 482 (Essex) HAA Rgt was amalgamated with 459 (Essex Regiment), 599 and 600 HAA Rgts into a new 459 (Essex) HAA Rgt – 459 was the old 59 (Essex Regiment), the original parent of 193 Bty, and 599 and 600 were also Essex Regiment conversions that had been in 26 (London) AA Bde, the predecessor of 52 AA Bde. The new regiment subsequently underwent a series of further mergers with East London units in the 1960s, and the Essex lineage was discontinued.

== Uniforms and insignia ==
During its stay in Gibraltar the regiment adopted an arm badge consisting of the Key of Gibraltar flanked by two 'A's, embroidered in yellow on a red upright rectangle. This badge continued to be worn by 482 (Essex) HAA Rgt until 1955.

== Honorary Colonel ==
Retired Major J.D. Sherwood was appointed Honorary Colonel of 82nd AA Rgt on 8 March 1939.

== Sources ==
- Basil Collier, History of the Second World War, United Kingdom Military Series: The Defence of the United Kingdom, London: HM Stationery Office, 1957.
- T.K. Derry, History of the Second World War: The Campaign in Norway, London: HMSO, 1952.
- Gen Sir Martin Farndale, History of the Royal Regiment of Artillery: The Years of Defeat: Europe and North Africa, 1939–1941, Woolwich: Royal Artillery Institution, 1988/London: Brasseys, 1996, ISBN 1-85753-080-2.
- J.B.M. Frederick, Lineage Book of British Land Forces 1660–1978, Vol II, Wakefield, Microform Academic, 1984, ISBN 1-85117-009-X.
- Joslen, H. F. (2003) [1960]. Orders of Battle: Second World War, 1939–1945. Uckfield, East Sussex: Naval and Military Press. ISBN 978-1-84342-474-1.
- Norman E.H. Litchfield, The Territorial Artillery 1908–1988 (Their Lineage, Uniforms and Badges), Nottingham: Sherwood Press, 1992, ISBN 0-9508205-2-0.
- Gen Sir Frederick Pile's despatch: "The Anti-Aircraft Defence of the United Kingdom from 28th July, 1939, to 15th April, 1945" London Gazette 18 December 1947.
- Maj-Gen I.S.O. Playfair, History of the Second World War, United Kingdom Military Series: The Mediterranean and Middle East, Vol I: The Early Successes against Italy (to May 1941), London: HMSO, 1954/Uckfield, Naval & Military Press, 2004, ISBN 1-845740-65-3.
- Nicholas Rankin, Defending the Rock: How Gibraltar Defeated Hitler, London: Faber & Faber, 2017, ISBN 978-0-571-30770-8.
- Brig N.W. Routledge, History of the Royal Regiment of Artillery: Anti-Aircraft Artillery 1914–55, London: Royal Artillery Institution/Brassey's, 1994, ISBN 1-85753-099-3.
- Nicholas Shakespeare, Six Minutes in May: How Churchill Unexpectedly Became Prime Minister, London: Harvill Secker, 2017, ISBN 978-1-846-55972-3.
- Colin Smith, England's Last War Against France: Fighting Vichy 1940–1942, London: Weidenfeld & Nicolson, 2009, ISBN 978-0-297-85218-6.

=== External sources ===
- British Army units from 1945 on
- Orders of Battle at Patriot Files
- Royal Artillery 1939–1945
- Graham Watson, The Territorial Army 1947 Archived 9 December 2021 at the Wayback Machine
