= 15th Anti-Aircraft Brigade =

- Cap badge of the Royal Artillery under King George VI
- Active: 2 September 1941 – 7 March 1944; 1 January 1947 – 31 December 1957
- Country: United Kingdom
- Branch: British Army
- Type: Air defence command
- Role: Anti-aircraft defence of Gibraltar
- Size: Brigade
- Part of: British Forces Gibraltar; 1st Anti-Aircraft Group
- Brigade HQ: RAF Gibraltar; Woolwich
- Engagements: Second World War; Defence of Gibraltar

Commanders
- Brigadier: Duncan Learmonth

15th Anti-Aircraft Brigade (15th AA Bde) was an air defence formation of the Royal Artillery which saw service during the middle years of the Second World War. The brigade was formed in Gibraltar to control those anti-aircraft (AA) units based there and disbanded shortly after the air threat had been diminished in 1944. The brigade was later reformed in 1947 as part of the post-war regular army, but disbanded in 1957 following the end of the AA era.

== Second World War ==
=== Background ===
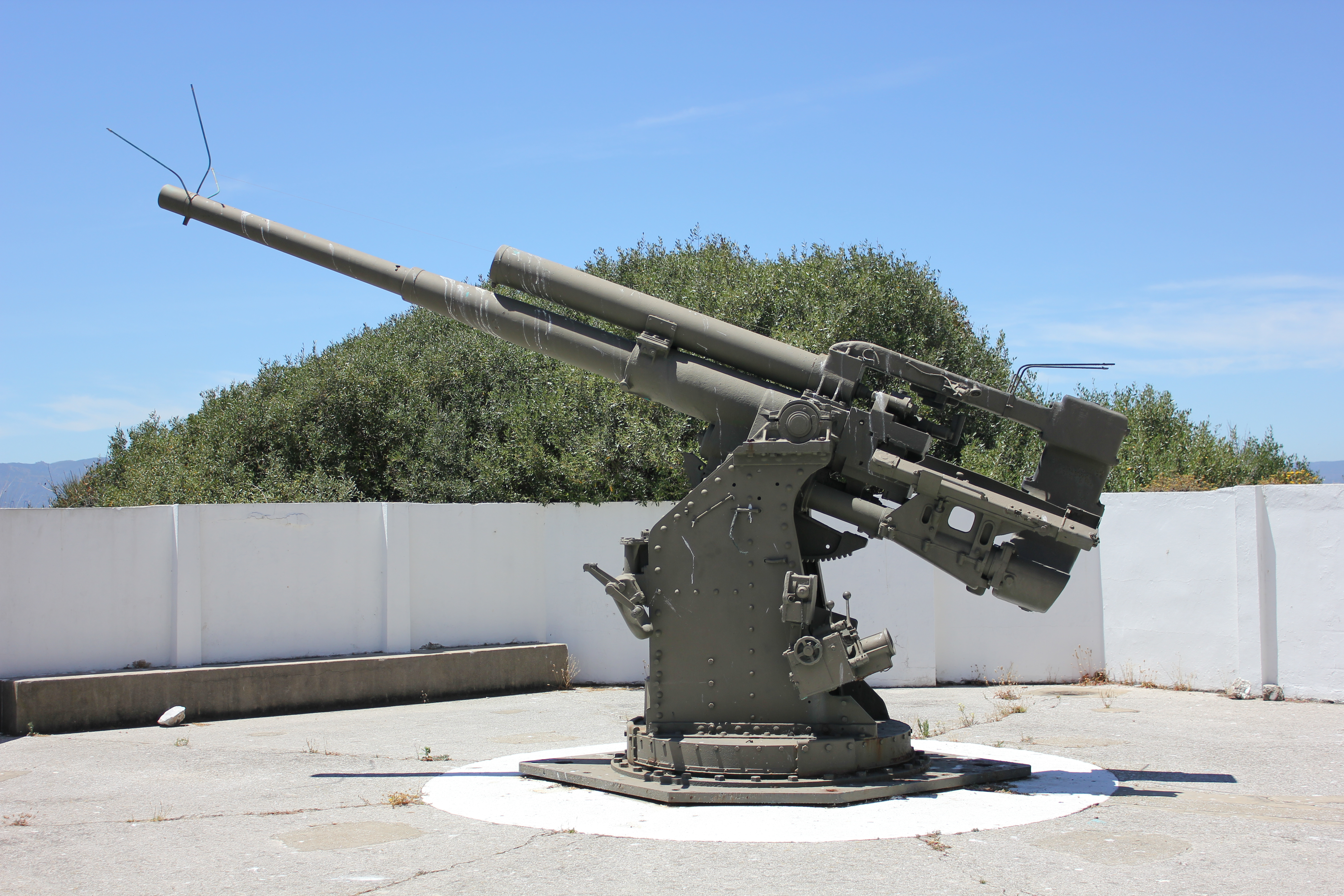
3.7 inch anti-aircraft gun at Napier of Magdala Battery, Gibraltar

On the outbreak of war in September 1939 there had only been two batteries (bty) (9 and 19 AA Btys) manning the totally inadequate AA defences of Gibraltar, which consisted of four old QF 3-inch heavy AA guns and four new QF 3.7-inch heavy AA guns, split in two-gun sections to give the widest possible coverage, and two of the new Bofors 40mm light AA guns to protect the Royal Navy Dockyard, with the assistance of Royal Navy (RN) 2-pounder pom-pom guns. 10th AA Rgt was formed in December 1939 to command 9 and 19 AA Btys and train the anti-aircraft section of the new Gibraltar Defence Force (GDF), which took over the 3-inch guns. Apart from occasional shots fired at unidentified aircraft penetrating Gibraltar's airspace, there were no attacks on the fortress during the 'Phoney War' period.

After the Fall of France, a group of AA detachments under 53rd (City of London) AA Rgt escaped from Marseilles aboard the SS Alma Dawson. A French dockyard strike prevented them from loading any of their 3-inch guns or vehicles, but they mounted Bofors guns on the ship's deck and put to sea on 18 June. On arrival in Gibraltar they reinforced 10th AA Rgt. 82nd (Essex) AA Regiment arrived on 27 June, and once it had unloaded its guns and equipment 53rd AA Rgt re-embarked for home.

There followed a reorganisation of the AA units in Gibraltar: 19 AA Bty joined 82nd AA Rgt, together with the Gibraltar Defence Forces heavy anti-aircraft (HAA) battery, while 9 AA Bty took over all the Bofors guns. A searchlight battery arrived, and an AA Operations Room (AAOR) was established to control all the gunsites and to coordinate with AA-equipped ships in the harbour. 10th AA Rgt HQ was ordered to be transferred to Malta in July, but this did not occur until November when, as part of Operation Coat, a reinforcement convoy for Malta put in at Gibraltar and picked it up.

The first serious air raid on Gibraltar came at 02.00 on 18 July, when two unidentified aircraft bombed the slopes of the rock, causing some fatalities. The attack was thought to be by the Vichy French Air Force in retaliation for the British attack on the French fleet at Mers-el-Kebir on 3 July (Operation Catapult), which had been carried out by Force H from Gibraltar. On 21 August the AA defences brought down a Savoia-Marchetti SM.79 bomber during a raid by the Italian Regia Aeronautica. On 24 and 25 September waves of Vichy bombers attacked Gibraltar again in retaliation for the British and Free French attack on Dakar (Operation Menace), and caused considerable damage. Several of these bombers were shot down by the combined AA fire. On other occasions the guns fired at single Italian reconnaissance aircraft, known to the garrison as 'Persistent Percy'.

=== Formation ===
Due to the increase in raids and the coming North African campaign, the War Office (WO) approved the formation of a new AA Brigade which would handle the increasing demands brought on CRA, Gibraltar. This new formation was to be known as the 15th Anti-Aircraft Brigade (15th AA Bde) which was to take over all AA matters on the rock.

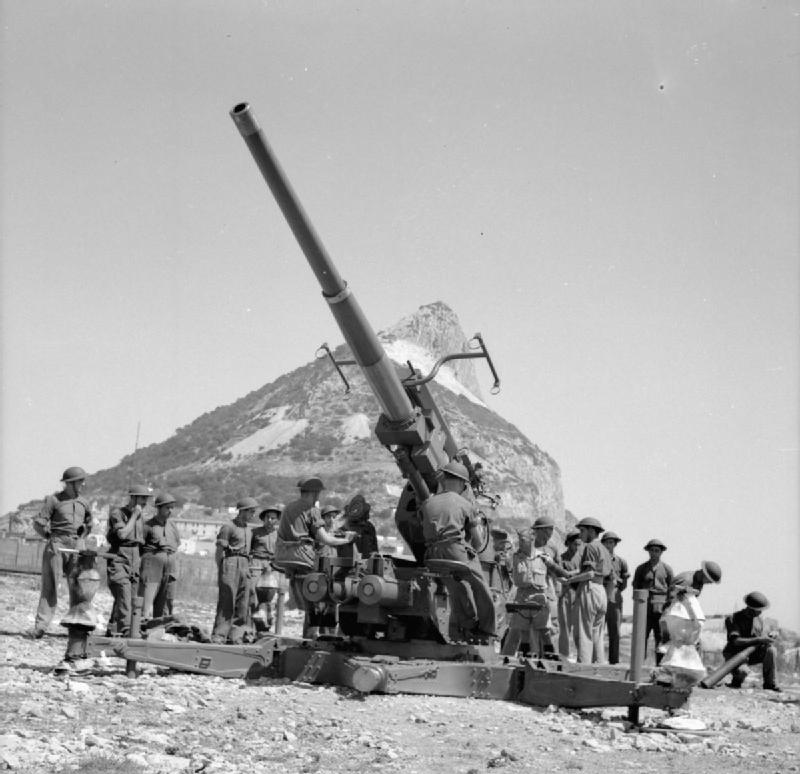
The Gibraltar Defence Force training on a 3.7-inch gun.

The brigade was then organised as;

- Brigade Headquarters under Brigadier Duncan Alexander Learmonth (Note: Assigned directly by the Governor of Gibraltar in September 1941)
- 142nd General Operation Post (Operations Room)
- 3rd Light Anti-Aircraft Regiment, Royal Artillery (Regular) — raised in Woolwich 2 September, arrived in Gibraltar on 27 September 1941
  - Regimental Headquarters
  - 9th, 114th, and 126th LAA Btys
- 13th Heavy Anti-Aircraft Regiment, Royal Artillery (Regular, composite) (Note: Raised in Gibraltar with composite AA units based there, later disbanded on 10 December 1942)
  - Regimental Headquarters
  - 288th HAA Bty — from 94th HAA Regt, RA
  - No.1 Rocket AA Troop, Royal Artillery (AA Rockets)
  - 1st Radar Detection Finding Bty, RA
- 82nd (Essex) Heavy Anti-Aircraft Regiment, Royal Artillery (TA)
  - Regimental Headquarters
  - 156th, 193rd, and 256th HAA Btys
  - Gibraltar Defence Force HAA Bty, RA
- 3rd Searchlight Bty, RA — Formed 30 December 1939 in Gibraltar, formally administered by the 10th HAA Regt, RA

=== Gibraltar 'Blitz' ===
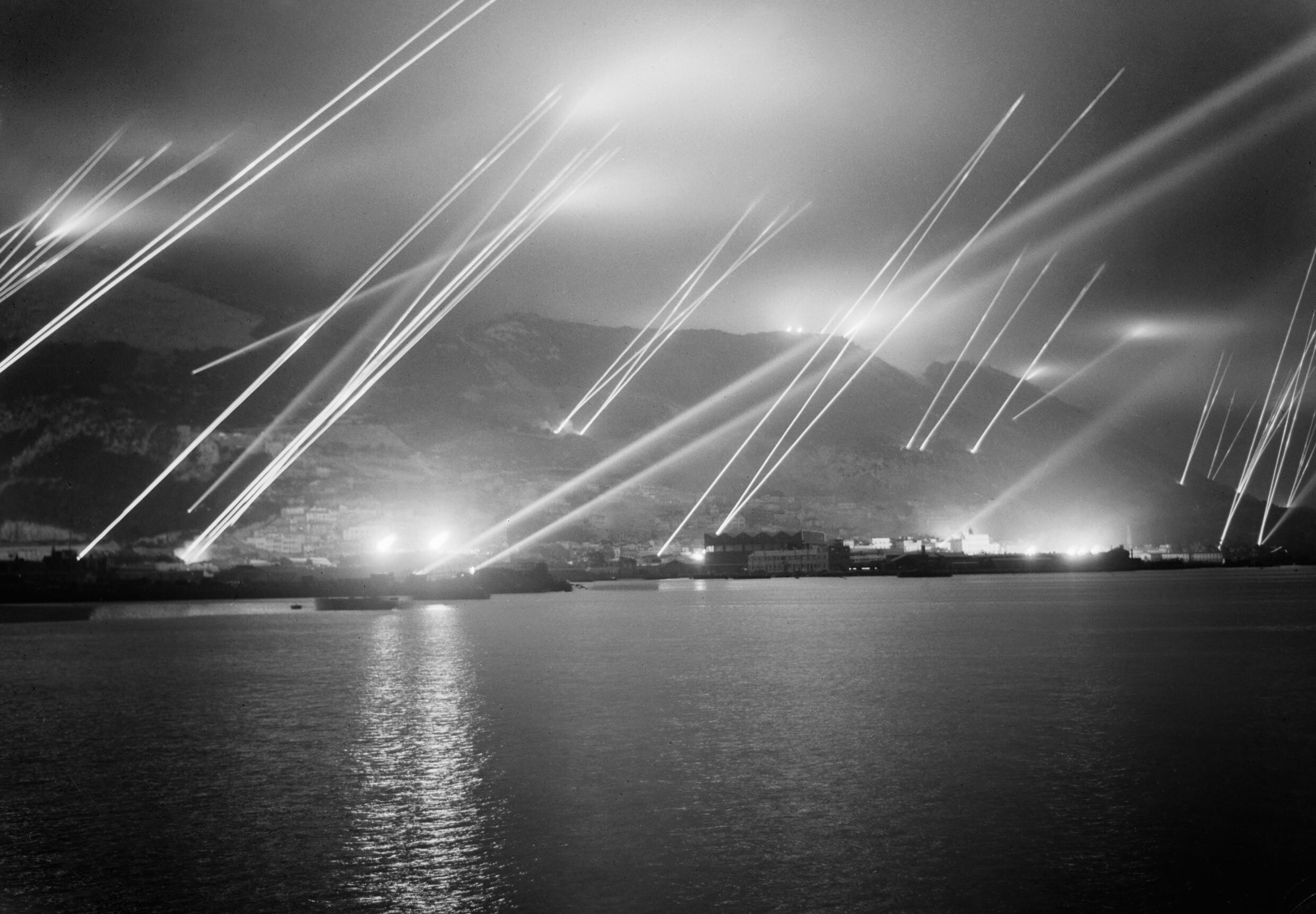
Searchlights over Gibraltar during an air raid practice on 20 November 1942.

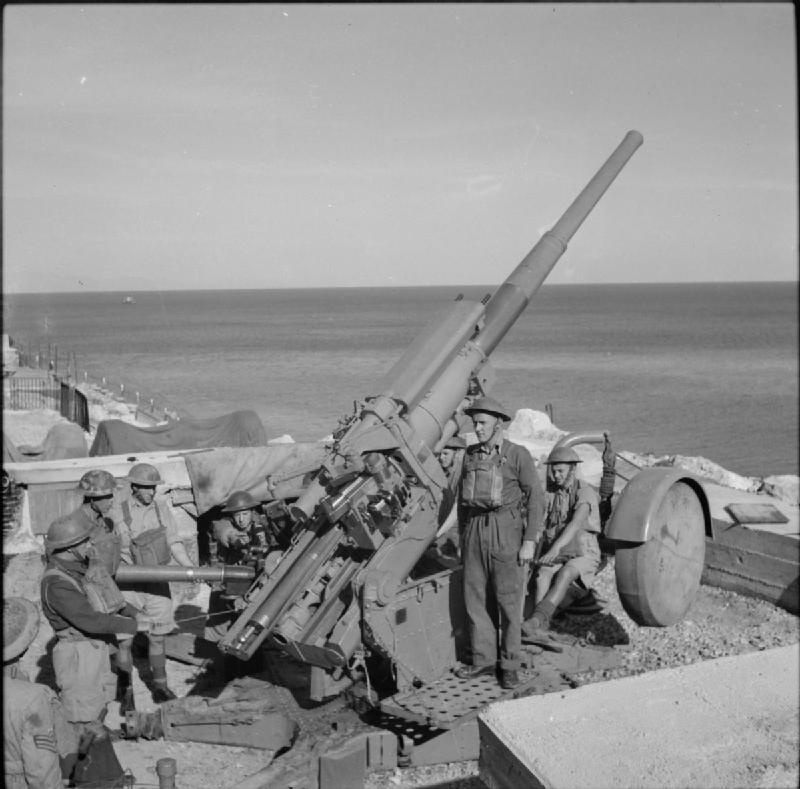
Mobile 3.7-inch HAA gun deployed at White Rock Battery, November 1941.

Among the many tasks facing 15th AA Brigade was the integration of AA fire in defence against sea or land invasion, in which it played an important part. Equally important was the careful distribution of gun and radar positions to ensure the most effective converge from the increased firepower and the constant practice of day and night barrages, in which live firing was regularly employed and closely recorded, to eliminate errors and weak spots. Aware of the vulnerability of positions to direct attack after opening fire, each AA position was given a Oerlikon 20mm light AA guns for self-defence. The basis of the plan for the revised layer was to bring the fire of 20 HAA guns to bear on a target travelling at 240 mph, approaching from any direction and at a typical height of 12,000 feet.

In January 1942, the Governor of Gibraltar, General John Vereker, 6th Viscount Gort (Lord Gort) wrote to the War Office asking for more HAA guns, preferably 5.25 inch heavy AA guns, for GLII sets with semi-automatic plotters and another 8 × Bofors 40 mm gun (LAA guns). Part of this request was due to 15th AA Brigade's wish to provide the North airfield with its own LAA defence; hitherto it had depended on the main layout for coverage. Nothing was sent, however, other than 3-inch rockets and their launchers and the airfield received only a small deployment of 20 mm Polsten and Bofors 40 mm guns together with some machine-guns, all withdrawn from other positions, and three searchlights.

During the whole of 1942 there were six bombing raids on Gibraltar, two of which were unidentified, and 18 reconnaissance overflights, all but two of them German. Four aircraft were shot down and others crash-landed in Spain. Some of the Italian raids missed their targets and dropped their bombs in Spanish territory, and Spanish AA guns sometimes opened fire as a raid passed towards them. By the end of 1942, the AA defences of Gibraltar reached a peak of scale and efficiency, but the threat had dwindled. There were only two or three reconnaissance flights during 1943.

=== Decrease in hostilities ===
It was War Office policy that army units should be replaced after three years' service in Gibraltar. Accordingly, in May 1943, the brigade was re-organised:

- Brigade Headquarters
- 142nd General Operation Post (Operations Room)
- 141st Light Anti-Aircraft Regiment, Royal Artillery
  - Regimental Headquarters
  - 456th, 466th, and 467th LAA Btys
- 175th Heavy Anti-Aircraft Regiment, Royal Artillery
  - Regimental Headquarters
  - 1st Range and Detection Finding (Radar) Battery
  - 1st Anti-Aircraft 'Z' Troop (AA rockets)
  - 375th, 386th, 441st, and 228th (see note) HAA Btys (Note: 596th HAA Bty was relieving 228th HAA Bty)
- 3rd Searchlight Battery, Royal Artillery

Finally in 1943 due to the reduction of raids by the Luftwaffe, the brigade was slowly placed into an effective suspended animation, and finally in February 1944 was disbanded.

== Post-war ==
As part of the postwar reorganisation of the Royal Artillery, a new 15th Anti-Aircraft Brigade (15 AA Bde) was formed as the successor to the old TA 45th Anti-Aircraft Brigade originally based in Newport, Monmouthshire, Wales. The new brigade headquarters were established on 1 January 1947 in Woolwich. As part of Anti-Aircraft Command's 'Ten Year Plan on Air Defence', the 15 AA Bde was assigned to the new 1st Anti-Aircraft Group, tasked with guarding London, the Thames, Medway, Harwich, and Dover. The brigade's organisation was now as follows:

- Brigade Headquarters, at Woolwich
- 101st (Mixed) Heavy Anti-Aircraft Regiment, Royal Artillery (Note: The prefix '(Mixed)' indicates the regiment contained women of the Auxiliary Territorial Service.) — reduced to cadre 30 June 1948, S/A commenced 10 November 1948 (completed 30 November 1948)
  - Regimental Headquarters
  - 241 (Mixed) Heavy Anti-Aircraft Battery
  - 296 (Mixed) Heavy Anti-Aircraft Battery
  - 323 (Mixed) Heavy Anti-Aircraft Battery — disbanded 10 October 1948
- 102nd Heavy Anti-Aircraft Regiment, Royal Artillery, at Milton Barracks, Gravesend — commenced disbandment 10 October 1948 (completed 30 November 1948)
  - Regimental Headquarters
  - 278 Heavy Anti-Aircraft Battery
  - 290 Heavy Anti-Aircraft Battery
  - 293 Heavy Anti-Aircraft Battery
- 103rd Heavy Anti-Aircraft Regiment, Royal Artillery, at Horsham Barracks — commenced disbandment 6 September 1948 (completed 27 September)
  - Regimental Headquarters
  - 267 Heavy Anti-Aircraft Battery
  - 300 Heavy Anti-Aircraft Battery
  - 312 Heavy Anti-Aircraft Battery

The 1947 plan was never fully implemented, and most of the Regular units assigned to AA Command were disbanded as part of postwar demobilisation. As the Cold War developed, there was a need for new weapons, leading to the rise of surface-to-air missiles and 'blind fire' radar control, with the consequent decline of HAA guns and searchlights. There was also political pressure for defence budget cuts. In March 1955 AA Command and its groups were disbanded and the remaining AA defence units in the UK came under control of the Home Commands and Districts.

Therefore, the brigade headquarters was placed in suspended animation on 31 October 1955, and disbanded on 31 December 1957. At the time of disbandment, the brigade commanded no units.
