= Great and Little Plumstead =

Civil parish in Norfolk, England

Coordinates: 52.64898°N 1.41277°E

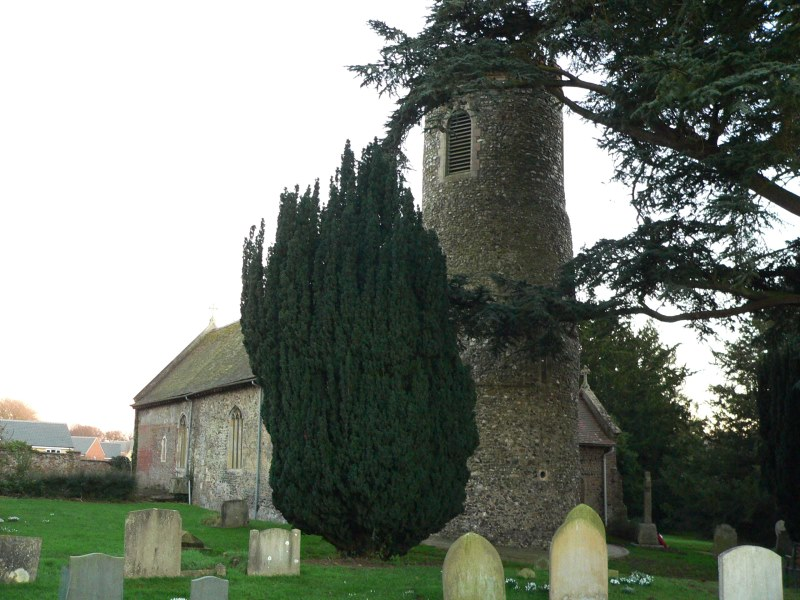
- Little Plumstead St Protase and St Gervase

- Location within Norfolk
- Area: 2.00 sq mi (5.2 km^{2})
- Population: 125 (2021 census)
  - Density: 63/sq mi (24/km^{2})
- OS grid reference: TG309111
- Civil parish: Great and Little Plumstead
- District: Broadland
- Shire county: Norfolk
- Region: East
- Country: England
- Sovereign state: United Kingdom
- Post town: NORWICH
- Postcode district: NR13
- Police: Norfolk
- Fire: Norfolk
- Ambulance: East of England
- UK Parliament: Broadland and Fakenham

Great and Little Plumstead is a civil parish in the English county of Norfolk, consisting of the villages of Great Plumstead, Little Plumstead and Thorpe End.

Plumstead is located 4.2 miles (6.8 km) south of Wroxham and 5.2 miles (8.4 km) east of Norwich.

== History ==
Plumstead's name is of Anglo-Saxon origin and derives from the Old English for plum-tree place.

In the Domesday Book, Great & Little Plumstead are listed together as a settlement in the hundred of Blofield.

In the mid-Twentieth Century, a hospital was set up in the grounds of Little Plumstead Hall treating patients with mental health issues. The building was eventually closed after an arson attack.

During the Second World War, a starfish decoy site was built in Plumstead to draw Luftwaffe bombers away from Norwich.

== Geography ==
According to the 2021 census, Plumstead has a population of 125 people which shows a decrease from the 128 people recorded in the 2011 census.

The junction between the A47, between Birmingham and Lowestoft, and the A1270, the Northern Distributor Road, is located in the parish.

The Witton Run also passes through the parish.

== St. Mary's Church ==
Great Plumstead's church is dedicated to Saint Mary and dates from the Eighteenth Century. St. Mary's is located within the village on Church Road and has been Grade II listed since 1962. The church still holds Sunday services three times a month.

Many of the medieval features of the church were destroyed in a fire in 1891, with the churchtower being subsequently rebuilt.

== St. Protase & St. Gervase Church ==
Little Plumstead's church is dedicated to Saint Gervase and Saint Protase and is one of Norfolk's 124 remaining round-tower churches. The church is located within the village on Hospital Road and has been Grade II listed since 1962. The church remains open three times a week for Sunday services.

== Amenities ==
The Walled Garden Community Shop and Cafe is a business set in a Victorian Walled Garden in Little Plumstead. It is run as a community benefit society.

== Governance ==
Great & Little Plumstead are part of the electoral ward of Plumstead for local elections and is part of the district of Broadland.

The village's national constituency is Broadland and Fakenham which has been represented by the Conservative Party's Jerome Mayhew MP since 2019.

== War Memorial ==
Great Plumstead War Memorial is a stone wheel-headed cross inside St. Mary's Churchyard which was unveiled in 1920. Little Plumstead War Memorial is also a wheel-headed cross but is located inside St. Protase & Gervase's Churchyard. Combined, the memorials list the following names for the First World War:

Rank	Name	Unit	Date of death	Burial/Commemoration
Lt.	Anthony J. Bavin	HMS Mary Rose	17 Oct. 1917	Chatham Naval Memorial
Lt.	Nigel B. Bavin	3rd Bn., Essex Regiment	23 May 1915	New Irish Farm Cemetery
ASn.	Walter Henry	HMS Cressy	22 Sep. 1914	Chatham Naval Memorial
LCpl.	William C. Parish	7th Bn., Border Regiment	12 Oct. 1917	Tyne Cot
Gnr.	Frank Burdett	248th Bty., Royal Garrison Artillery	12 Oct. 1917	Birr Crossroads Cemetery
Pte.	Arthur P. George	6th Bn., Bedfordshire Regiment	22 May 1917	Tank Cemetery
Pte.	Richard High	7th Bn., Border Regiment	4 Jul. 1916	Thiepval Memorial
Pte.	Bertie V. Webb	7th Bn., Border Regt.	19 Feb. 1916	Lijssenthoek Cemetery
Pte.	Walter T. Powley	3rd Bn., Coldstream Guards	26 Oct. 1914	Menin Gate
Pte.	Robert L. Bird	53rd Bn., Royal Fusiliers	17 Apr. 1919	Little Plumstead Churchyard
Pte.	Charles Wright	1st Bn., Norfolk Regiment	27 Jul. 1916	Thiepval Memorial
Pte.	Robert Colk	1st Bn., Norfolk Regt.	24 Apr. 1915	Blauwepoort Farm Cemetery
Pte.	Bertie E. Simmons	1st Bn., Norfolk Regt.	10 Oct. 1917	Tyne Cot
Pte.	Stephen F. Drewery	2nd Bn., Norfolk Regt.	19 May 1915	Basra War Cemetery
Pte.	Louis Gunton	9th Bn., Norfolk Regt.	15 Sep. 1916	Thiepval Memorial
Pte.	Arthur F. Brister	7th Bn., Northamptonshire Regt.	20 Jun. 1918	Bully-Grenay Cemetery
Pte.	Arthur R. Colk	1st Bn., Queen's Royal Regiment	9 May 1918	Little Plumstead Churchyard
Pte.	M. Harry Rushbrook	15th Bn., Suffolk Regiment	17 Sep. 1918	Bronfay Farm Cemetery
Pte.	Frank D. Edwards	2/5th Bn., Yorkshire Regiment	25 Oct. 1918	Norwich Cemetery
Rfn.	Alfred J. Simmons	2nd Bn., Rifle Brigade	25 Apr. 1918	Pozières Memorial
Spr.	Andrew Andrews	Royal Engineers	19 Nov. 1918	Little Plumstead Churchyard
Spr.	John Stanford	111th Coy., R.E.	21 Oct. 1914	Boulogne Eastern Cemetery
Tel.	Jack F. Powley	HMS Vanguard	9 Jul. 1917	Plymouth Naval Memorial

The following men were added to the Little Plumstead Memorial after the Second World War:

Rank	Name	Unit	Date of death	Burial/Commemoration
Sgt.	William G. Gunton	Royal Air Force Volunteer Reserve	13 Jan. 1945	Runnymede Memorial
Pte.	Ronald W. Everson	4th Bn., Royal Norfolk Regiment	12 Feb. 1944	Yokohama War Cemetery
