= Seaham Colliery =

County Durham colliery

Coordinates: 54.8401°N 1.3607°W

The Seaham Colliery was a coal mine in County Durham in the North of England. The mine suffered an underground explosion in 1880 which resulted in the deaths of upwards of 160 people, including surface workers and rescuers.

Among the dead were 36 non-commissioned officers (NCO)s and men of the 2nd (Seaham) Durham Artillery Volunteer Corps, a part-time unit of the Royal Artillery who were recruited from workers at the mine. They had been commanded by the mine's owner, the Marquess of Londonderry.

The mine opened in 1849 with the sinking of the first pit. In the late 19th century, the colliery was producing between 2,500 and 2,800 tons of coal per day, shipped to Seaham Harbour and Sunderland Dock by rail. In 1914, at it height, the colliery employed more than 2,500 people below ground and 500 above ground. It was nationalised in 1947, merged with Vane Tempest colliery in 1988, and closed by 1993.

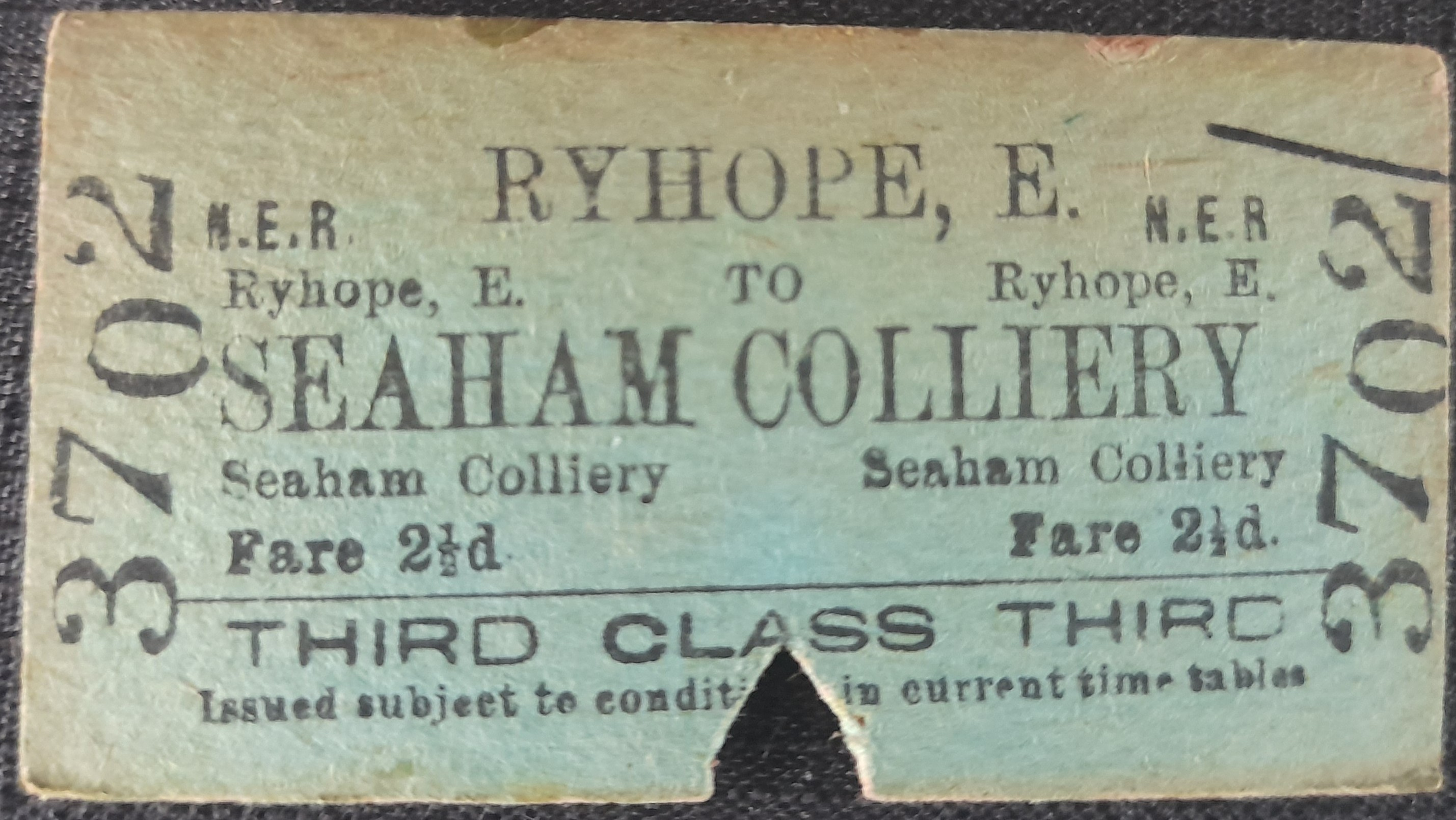
Pre 1925 N.E.R. Ryhope E. toSeaham Colliery 3rd class train ticket.
