= 175th Heavy Anti-Aircraft Regiment, Royal Artillery =

175th Heavy Anti-Aircraft Regiment, RA
- Cap Badge of the Royal Artillery
- Active: 3 October 1942–1 May 1947
- Country: United Kingdom
- Branch: British Army
- Type: Heavy Anti-Aircraft Regiment
- Role: Air Defence
- Size: 3–4 Batteries
- Part of: 15 AA Brigade; HQ Royal Artillery, Gibraltar
- Engagements: Defence of Gibraltar

175th Heavy Anti-Aircraft Regiment, Royal Artillery (175th HAA Rgt) was an air defence unit of the British Army formed during World War II. It served in defence of the vital naval and air base at Gibraltar.

== Origin ==
175th HAA Regiment was formed in October 1942 by taking an experienced battery from each of three existing Heavy Anti-Aircraft (HAA) regiments of Anti-Aircraft Command:

- 375 HAA Bty from 118th HAA Rgt in 45 Anti-Aircraft Brigade of 9 Anti-Aircraft Division defending South Wales (375 HAA Bty was then attached to 67 AA Bde of 11 AA Division defending the West Midlands)
- 386 HAA Bty from 120th HAA Rgt in 26 AA Bde of 1 AA Division defending North London
- 441 HAA Bty from 116th HAA Rgt in 55 AA Bde of 8 AA Division defending Plymouth and Falmouth in South West England

== Training ==
The new Regimental Headquarters (RHQ) was formed at Clifton, Bristol, on 3 October 1942 and attached to 46 AA Bde, but in early November its three batteries were still scattered around the country: 375 HAA Bty attached to 60 AA Bde in South West England, 386 to 1 AA Group in London and 441 still with 55 AA Bde. In December the regiment with its batteries now concentrated was transferred to 63 AA Bde in Scotland, where AA Command units were often sent for training. In April 1943 the regiment left AA Command and came under War Office control, preparatory to proceeding overseas.

== Gibraltar ==
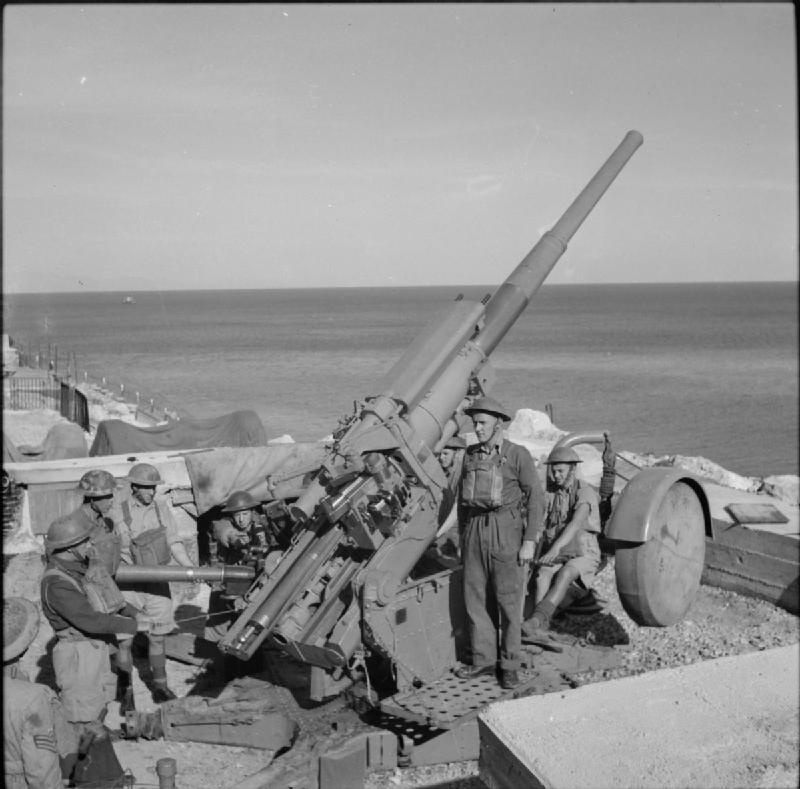
White Rock Battery on Gibraltar with a 3.7-inch mobile HAA gun.

On 23 May 1943, 175th HAA Rgt, with 375, 386 and 441 HAA Btys, arrived in Gibraltar from the United Kingdom to relieve 82nd (Essex) HAA Rgt. It came under the command of 15 AA Bde, and 228 (Edinburgh) HAA Bty from the recently disbanded 13th HAA Rgt was attached to it from 27 May, as was the Gibraltar Defence Force H.A.A. Bty. On 25 August 228 HAA Bty left Gibraltar and was relieved by 596 HAA Bty transferred from 177th HAA Rgt in the UK.

The vital naval base and airfield on Gibraltar had been overflown and sometimes attacked by Vichy French, Italian and German aircraft during 1940–42, and the AA defences had reached peak strength in early 1943. Ironically, after 175th HAA Rgt arrived there were only two or three reconnaissance overflights during 1943. By the end of the year, with Italy out of the war and the German forces in Italy in retreat, it was clear that the Axis powers could no longer mount an effective air strike against Gibraltar. A reduction in the AA defences began in order to release men urgently needed elsewhere.

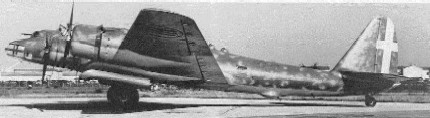
Piaggio_P.108 long range bomber used by the Italian Regia Aeronautica to bomb Gibraltar

In February 1944 the rundown started with the disbandment of 15 AA Bde HQ, overall command of the AA defences passing to the fortress's HQ Royal Artillery. On 7 March RHQ of 175th HAA Rgt took over operational control of 451 LAA Bty from 141st Light AA Rgt which was being withdrawn, together with 1 RDF Bty (radar), 1 AA 'Z' Troop (Z Battery rocket launchers) and 142 Gun Operations Room. Then on 20 August 596 HAA Bty and 1 AA 'Z' Trp left Gibraltar. By September there were only 16 operational HAA guns in the fortress, the remainder being in a state of care and maintenance only. Finally, on 26 October, 441 HAA and 451 LAA Btys were disbanded as the men were sent back to the UK, and 1 Radar Bty became independent; there were no other changes to the end of the war.

== Postwar ==
In the postwar reorganisation of the Royal Artillery, RHQ of 175th HAA Rgt was redesignated 113 HAA Rgt (replacing the disbanded 113th HAA Rgt) on 1 April 1947, with 375 HAA, 386 HAA and 441 (now LAA) Btys becoming 328, 329 and 330 HAA Btys. But on 1 May 1947 the regiment was disbanded, retroactive to 1 April 1947.
