= Blauwepoort Farm Commonwealth War Graves Commission Cemetery =

Military cemetery in Ypres, Belgium

Blauwepoort Farm
- Commonwealth War Graves Commission
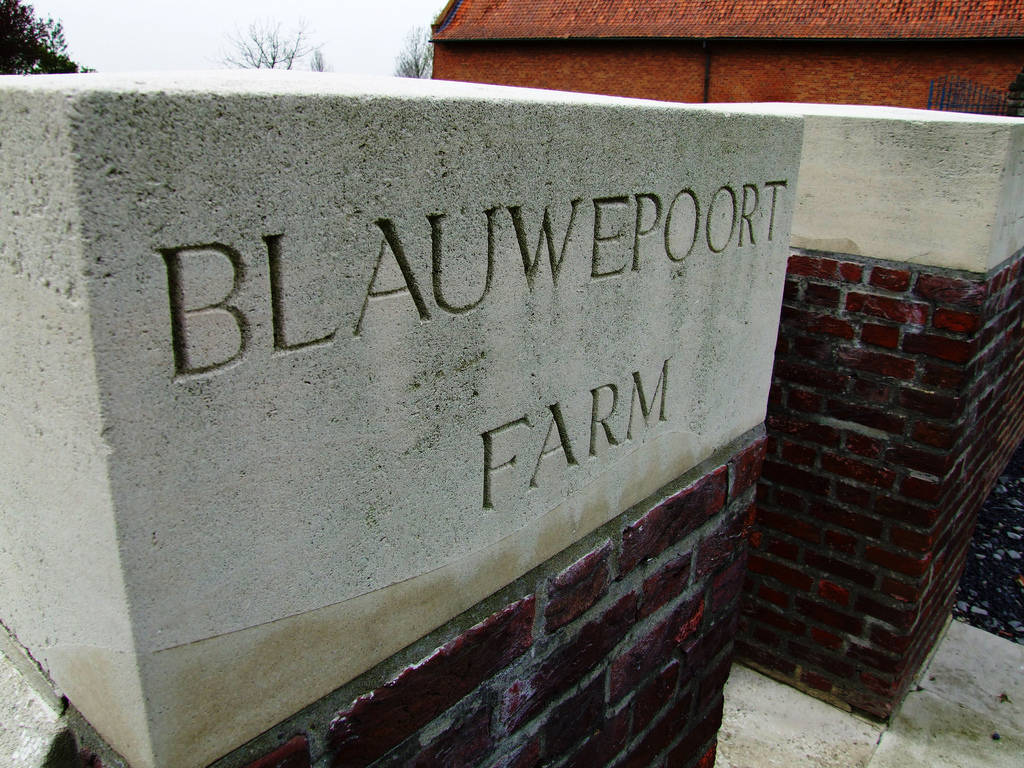
- Used for those deceased 1915–1916
- Established: 1914
- Location: 50°49′46″N 02°54′29″E near Ypres, West Flanders, Belgium
- Designed by: W H Cowlishaw
- Total burials: 90

Burials by nation
- Allies of World War I: United Kingdom: 90

Burials by war
- World War I: 90

Blauwepoort Farm is a Commonwealth War Graves Commission burial ground for the dead of the First World War located near Ypres (Dutch: Ieper) in Belgium on the Western Front.

The cemetery grounds were assigned to the United Kingdom in perpetuity by King Albert I of Belgium in recognition of the sacrifices made by the British Empire in the defence and liberation of Belgium during the war.

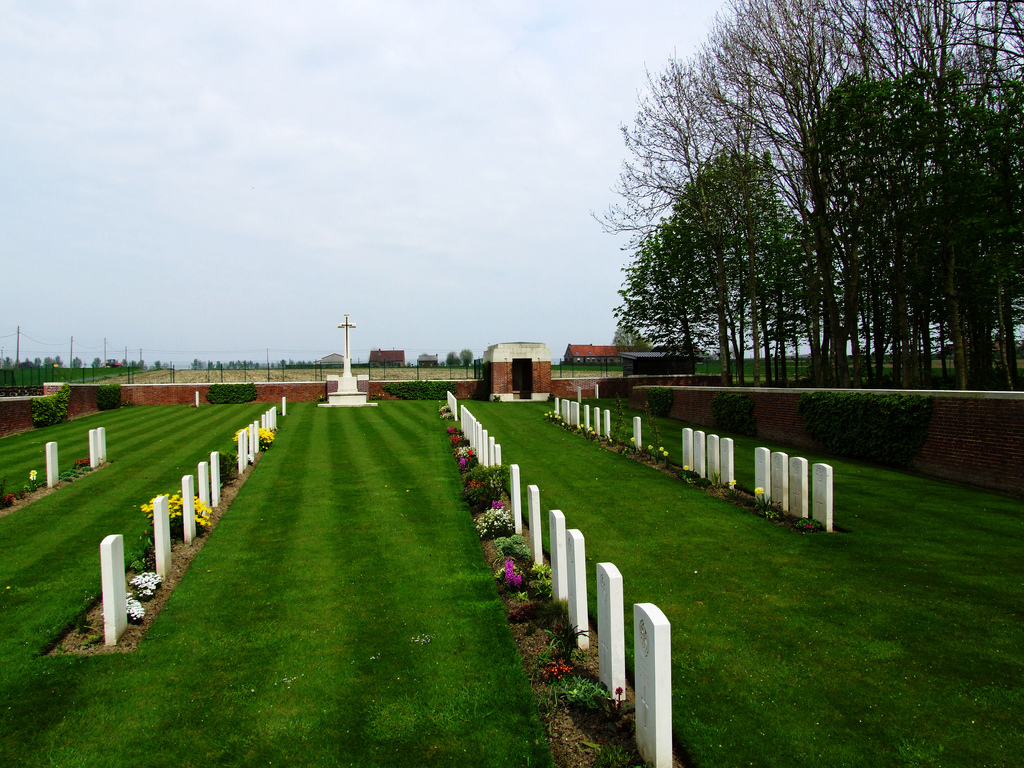
Cemetery grounds

== Foundation ==
The cemetery was begun in November 1914 by the French Chasseurs Alpins. British burials began in February 1915. The cemetery closed in November 1916, with the French graves being removed after the armistice.

The cemetery was designed by W H Cowlishaw.
