= White Rock Battery =

Artillery battery in Gibraltar

- Part of Fortifications of Gibraltar
- Gibraltar
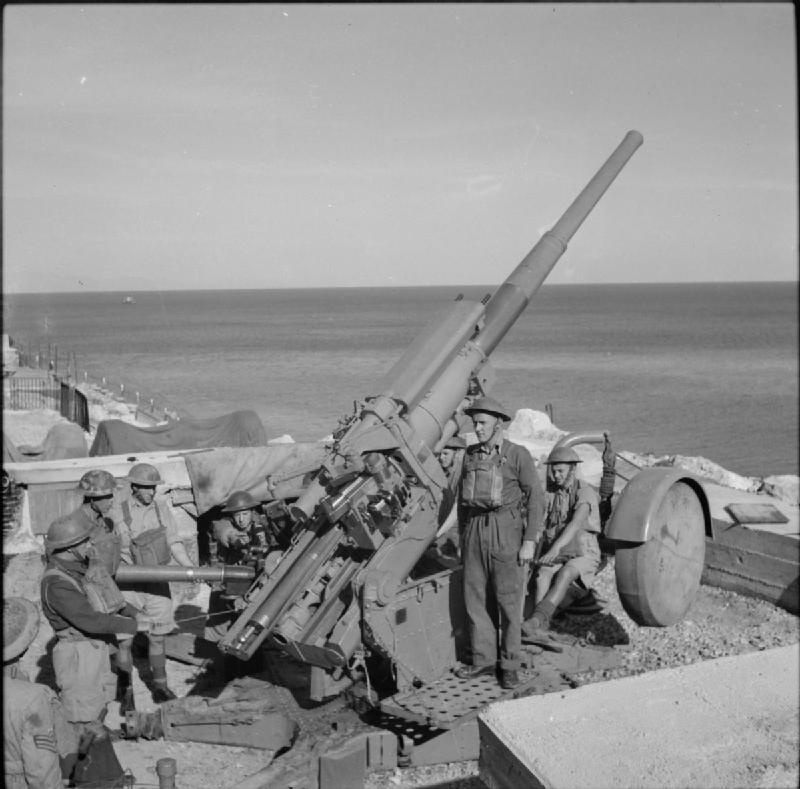
- 3.7-inch mobile anti-aircraft gun, November 1941

Site information
- Type: Artillery battery
- Owner: Ministry of Defence

Site history
- Built: 1941

White Rock Battery was an artillery battery in the British Overseas Territory of Gibraltar. It was located at the northern end of Catalan Bay at the point where the road down to the village meets the main road.

An anti-aircraft gun position was established here during World War II from 1941 to 1944. Two 3.7-inch Mk. II mobile anti-aircraft guns mounted on Mk. III platforms were installed on the battery in April 1941. They were removed on 21 July 1944.
