= 37th (Tyne Electrical Engineers) Light Anti-Aircraft Regiment, Royal Artillery =

37th (Tyne Electrical Engineers) Light Anti-Aircraft Regiment, RA
- Cap badge of the Royal Artillery
- Active: 28 August 1939 – 22 September 1944
- Country: United Kingdom
- Branch: Territorial Army
- Type: Light Anti-Aircraft Regiment
- Role: Air Defence
- Engagements: Battle of Britain; The Blitz; North Africa; Tunisia

The 37th (Tyne Electrical Engineers) Light Anti-Aircraft Regiment, Royal Artillery was an air defence unit of the British Army during World War II. It served at home during the Battle of Britain and The Blitz, and then went to the Middle East, where it defended the lines of communication of the Eighth Army in its advance across North Africa after the Battle of El Alamein and in the Tunisian Campaign.

== Origin ==
The unit was raised in late August 1939, as part of the rapid expansion of the Territorial Army (TA) after the Munich Crisis. It was formed in the Royal Artillery (RA) as a duplicate of 37th (Tyne Electrical Engineers) Anti-Aircraft Battalion, Royal Engineers, itself formed three years earlier by conversion of the Tyne Electrical Engineers (TEE). The TEE had been a Volunteer unit of the British Army at Tynemouth under various titles since 1860 and was the parent organisation for a large number of specialist coastal and air defence units during both World Wars.

== World War II ==
=== Mobilisation ===
37 LAA Regiment was still in the course of formation when World War II broke out in September 1939. It comprised 123 LAA Battery, forming at the Royal Artillery Drill Hall at Seaham Harbour, and 127 LAA Battery forming at the Yorkshire Hussars Drill Hall in Middlesbrough. Lieutenant-Colonel W. Brooks was appointed Commanding Officer on 21 September, and established Regimental Headquarters (RHQ) at Middlesbrough. 123 Battery had some clothing and equipment from the County Durham TA, but 127 'had neither clothing or equipment of any description'.

The regiment came under the command of 30th (Northumbrian) Anti-Aircraft Brigade in 7th AA Division. On 27 October it began to take over LAA defence at various RAF stations and other vital points (VPs) in NE England:

123 LAA Battery, County Durham

- 345 Troop at Birtley
- 346 Troop at Birtley
- 347 Troop at Ouston
- 348 Troop at RAF Thornaby
- 349 Troop at Darlington Junction

127 LAA Battery, North Riding of Yorkshire

- 361 Troop at RAF Catterick
- 362 Troop at RAF Dishforth
- 363 Troop at RAF Leeming
- 364 Troop at RAF Topcliffe

Each troop consisted of five Lewis guns; in September, each battery was also assigned a newly-formed six-gun troop: 461 Tp (formed at RAF Ottercops Moss) to 123 Bty, 464 Tp (formed at Danby, North Yorkshire) to 127 Bty. From November, the regiment began to take over Bofors guns at the VPs and the winter of 1939–40 was spent in training.

In July 1940, 52 (Independent) LAA Bty was attached to the regiment with new recruits. This had been formed at Thorncliffe on 15 December 1938. There were occasional engagements with hostile aircraft during the Battle of Britain in August 1940. At the end of August, all three batteries were finally at full establishment, and were reorganised the following month:

- 52 LAA Bty: 348, 351, 464 Tps
- 123 LAA Bty: 345, 346, 347, 349, 461 Tps
- 127 LAA Bty: 361, 362, 363, 364 Tps

=== The Blitz ===
From September, there were frequent air raid warnings and some action over Wallsend and Seaham.

During this period, Bombardier James Newby of the regiment carried out a notable act:

"On 11th November 1940, two officers of Fixed Defences, Tyne Area, were killed by the explosion of an anti-tank mine in a minefield. Bombardier Newby, who was nearby, believing one of the officers to be only wounded, cut the wire round the minefield and at a great personal risk, not knowing the location of the mines, entered the minefield for a distance of about 25 yards and got the body of one of the officers out. It was afterwards found that Bombardier Newby actually passed within six inches of other mines".

Newby was awarded the George Medal, gazetted on 11 March 1941.

In February 1941, 52 (Ind) LAA Bty left the regiment, going to Iceland in March to reinforce the AA cover for 'Alabaster Force', which had occupied the island the previous year. While there it joined the newly-formed 12th HAA Rgt. It was replaced in 37th (TEE) LAA Rgt on 10 March 1941 by 222 LAA Bty, which had formed on 12 December 1940 at 213th LAA Training Rgt at Carlisle from a cadre supplied by 28th LAA Rgt.

The regiment still formed part of 30 AA Bde in 7th AA Division but, at the end of May 1941, it handed over its VPs and moved to Blandford Camp for mobile training, and during July it mobilised at Barnsley for overseas service.

=== Middle East ===
RHQ embarked with 123 and 127 Btys, and the regimental sections of the Royal Corps of Signals (RCS), Royal Army Service Corps (RASC), Royal Army Ordnance Corps (RAOC) and Royal Electrical and Mechanical Engineers (REME) at Liverpool at the end of August. It sailed to India aboard HM Transport Otranto, reaching Bombay on 27 October. It then sailed on to Basra in Iraq, where it disembarked on 1 November. The regiment moved inland to Baghdad and Habbaniyah, where it was rejoined by 222 Bty and came under 8 AA Brigade.

After training in Iraq, the regiment moved in February 1942 to Beirut and Tripoli, Lebanon, where it came under Ninth Army, and then at the end of June moved on again to Egypt. 123 Bty remained at Beirut, and 127 Bty came under the command of 14 LAA Regiment at Suez, while 37 LAA RHQ took over 23 Heavy AA Bty of the Hong Kong and Singapore Artillery and 231 LAA Bty RA. The regiment came under 18 AA Bde and took up positions to defend the Nile Delta and Suez Canal zones, including Heliopolis airfield, which was raided on 1 August, the AA guns shooting down one aircraft.

=== North Africa ===
In September, the regiment was warned that it was to be sent to Cyprus, but this move was cancelled. Batteries continued to be swapped between regiments, but in mid-October the regiment received orders to reform and move into the desert to join Eighth Army with 123, 127, and 222 Btys back under command. The regiment was in 18 AA Bde held in reserve until after Eighth Army's anticipated breakthrough and advance into Libya.

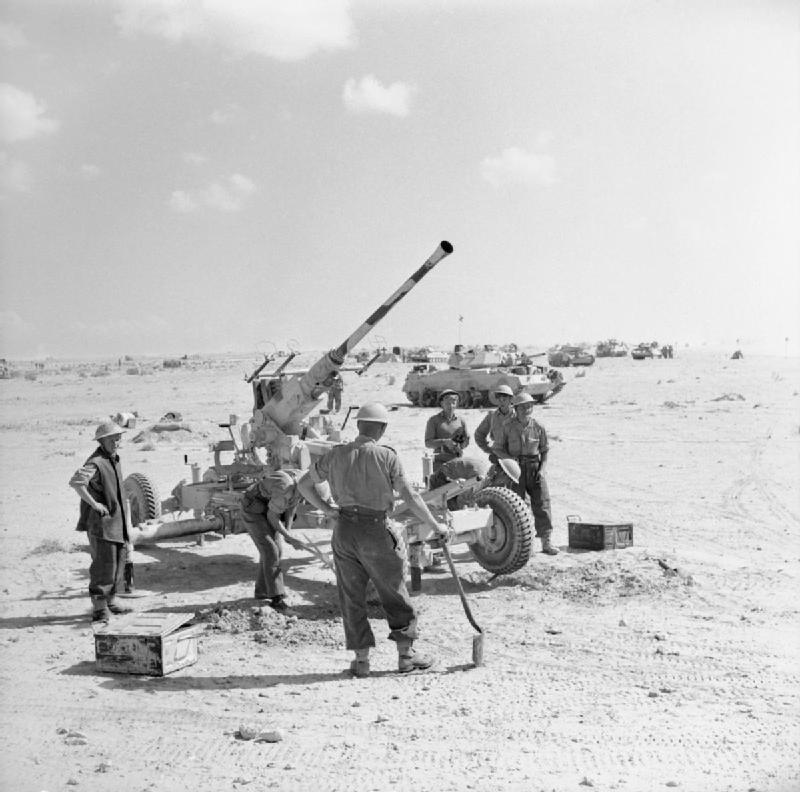
Bofors gun being emplaced in the Western Desert, October 1942.

The Second Battle of El Alamein opened on 23 October, and 37 LAA Regiment followed the subsequent advance. By the end of the year, it was defending the area around Benghazi under 2 AA Bde, with 213 HAA Bty attached. 37th LAA's RASC section was redesignated 1548 LAA Regiment Platoon, RASC, on 19 February 1943.

In late February 1943, the regiment moved up to Tripoli, Libya, covering the harbour and roads and Eighth Army's lines of communication, and then in March moved on to Tunisia, through Medenine to Gabès, with the commanding officer, Lt-Col J.T. Kidd, leading the forward echelon ('Kiddforce') including 291 HAA Bty. At the beginning of April, the regiment took up positions round Gabès and the landing ground at El Hamma, defending against bombing raids (claiming some enemy aircraft downed) and coming under enemy shellfire. As the final stages of the Tunisian Campaign were being played out, the regiment moved up to Sfax under 12 AA Bde to defend airfields, taking up positions around the Hani landing grounds before aircraft of 57th and 79th Pursuit Groups, USAAF, arrived to operate from them. B Troop of 222 Bty defended Hergla landing ground.

The last Axis forces in Tunisia surrendered on 13 May 1943. 291 HAA Battery ceased to be under 37th LAA Regiment's command on 26 May, and on 30 May the regiment began to move from Hani back to Tripoli and then to Egypt (Qassassin in the Nile Delta). Here it re-equipped and trained, before moving to Palestine, where it came under the command of 10th Indian Infantry Division. In October the regiment was under 24 hours' notice to move as part of Force 292, earmarked for Operation Accolade, an attack on Rhodes, but this was cancelled and it continued training exercises.

=== Disbandment ===
By January 1944, the regiment was deployed defending Haifa under 1 AA Bde, but the Middle East was now a backwater, and manpower was required in other theatres. In August, the regiment moved back to Egypt, where on 19 August it received orders from Twelfth Army to begin disbanding. This process took until 22 September, when 37th LAA Regiment was formally placed in a state of suspended animation.

== Postwar ==
When the TA was reconstituted in 1947, a number of the reformed units could trace their origin to the Tyne Electrical Engineers, including 537 Searchlight Regiment (Tyne Electrical Engineers), RA, representing both 37th S/L Regiment and 37th LAA Regiment.

== Commanding officers ==
- Lieutenant-Colonel W. Brooks, OBE, TD, 21 September 1939 – 25 June 1942
- Lieutenant-Colonel J.T. Kidd, 25 June 1942 – 7 August 1944
- Major C.S. Drabble, 7 August 1944–disbandment

== Prominent members ==
- Lieutenant Sir Ulick Temple Blake, 16th Baronet of Menlough
- Captain Hon J.R.H.T Cumming-Bruce, younger son of 6th Baron Thurlow
- Captain Viscount Castlereagh (later 8th Marquess of Londonderry)
- Bombardier George Newby, GM (see above)

== External sources ==
- British Military History
- Land Forces of Britain, the Empire and Commonwealth (Regiments.org)
- The Royal Artillery 1939–45
- British Army units from 1945 on
- Orders of Battle at Patriot Files
- Graham Watson, The Territorial Army 1947
