= 70th (Sussex) Searchlight Regiment, Royal Artillery =

70th (Sussex) Searchlight Regiment, RA 605th Heavy Anti-Aircraft Regiment, RA
- Royal Artillery cap badge of WWII
- Active: 1 November 1938–30 June 1950
- Country: United Kingdom
- Branch: Territorial Army
- Type: Searchlight Regiment
- Role: Air Defence
- Size: Regiment
- Garrison/HQ: Brighton
- Engagements: Battle of Britain; The Blitz

70th (Sussex) Searchlight Regiment Royal Artillery was an air defence unit of Britain's Territorial Army (TA) raised just before the outbreak of World War II, which served as part of Anti-Aircraft Command during and after the war.

== Origin ==
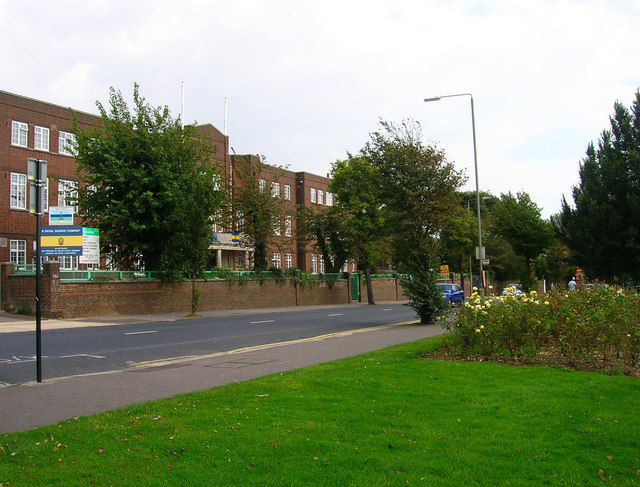
The 1930s TA Centre on Dyke Road, Brighton

As the international situation deteriorated in the late 1930s, the threat of air raids on the UK led to the rapid expansion in numbers of anti-aircraft (AA) units manned by members of the part-time TA. Formed on 1 November 1938, 70th (Sussex) was the first TA searchlight regiment raised by the Royal Artillery (previous TA S/L units had all been part of the Royal Engineers and/or converted from infantry battalions). It consisted of HQ and Nos 459–461 Companies (later Batteries) based at High Croft, Dyke Road, in Brighton (now Quebec Barracks of the Army Reserve). It was equipped with the new '90 cm Projector Anti Aircraft', a smaller and lighter piece of equipment than previous searchlights, with a more powerful high current density arc lamp with automatic carbon feed.

== World War II ==
90 cm Projector Anti-Aircraft, displayed at Fort Nelson, Portsmouth

=== Mobilisation ===
Anti-Aircraft Command mobilised in August 1939, ahead of the declaration of war on 3 September, and the regiment took its place in 27th (Home Counties) Anti-Aircraft Brigade, part of 6th AA Division tasked with defending South East England.

=== Portsmouth Blitz ===
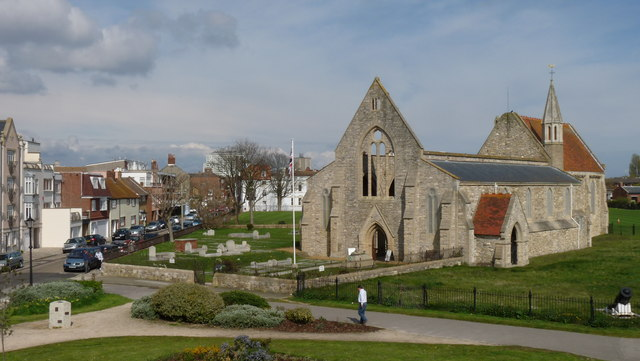
The Royal Garrison Church at Portsmouth, bombed on 10 January 1941

In 1940, 27 AA Bde transferred to 5th AA Division and moved to Portsmouth to assist in the defence of the Royal Naval Dockyards there. Portsmouth was a major target for the German Luftwaffe, and the regiment was present during the daytime bombing raids of the Battle of Britain, when searchlight detachments had a subsidiary role in plotting raids and in close defence with light machine-guns. Searchlights were vital for directing AA guns and night fighters during the night attacks of The Blitz (1940–41), when Portsmouth city centre was devastated by a series of raids. The city was attacked again during the Baedeker Blitz of 1942.

70th Searchlight Rgt sent a cadre of experienced officers and men to 231st S/L Training Rgt at Blandford Camp, where they formed a new 537 S/L Bty on 12 December 1940. 537 S/L Battery joined the regiment on 11 March 1941

=== Later war ===
By early 1944, with the lower threat of attack by the weakened Luftwaffe, AA Command was forced to release manpower for the planned invasion of Normandy (Operation Overlord). All Home Defence searchlight regiments were reduced from February 1944, and 70th S/L Rgt lost 537 S/L Bty, which commenced disbandment on 6 March, while E Troop of 459 S/L Bty left to become E Trp of 348 S/L Bty in 37th (Tyne Electrical Engineers) S/L Rgt.

As the threat from the Luftwaffe waned further after D Day, the War Office warned in June 1944 that AA Command would have to release manpower to provide reinforcements to 21st Army Group fighting in North West Europe. The run-down began in September: E/461 Trp left and became E Trp in 448 S/L Bty of 61st (South Lancashire Regiment) S/L Rgt, then on 28 September Regiment Headquarters and the remaining batterie of 70th S/L Rgt were placed in 'suspended animation' at Blackmore, Essex.

== Postwar ==
When the TA was reconstituted on 1 January 1947, 70th S/L Rgt reformed at Brighton as 605 (Mobile) Heavy Anti-Aircraft Regiment, RA (Sussex), forming part of 106 AA Bde. However, on 30 June 1950 the regiment was amalgamated into 344 (Sussex Yeomanry) Light AA/Searchlight Regiment, becoming R Bty of that regiment.

== Prominent figures ==
Among the first officers commissioned into the regiment on 1 November 1938 was Lieutenant (later Captain) Sir Herbert Latham, 2nd Baronet, MP. In 1941 he was court martialled and found guilty of 'improper behaviour' (homosexual acts) with three gunners and a civilian, for which he was dishonourably discharged and imprisoned.

== External sources ==
- Keith Brigstock 'Royal Artillery Searchlights', presentation to Royal Artillery Historical Society at Larkhill, 17 January 2007.
- British Military History
- British Army units from 1945 on
- Orders of Battle at Patriot Files
- Royal Artillery 1939–1945
- Graham Watson, The Territorial Army 1947
