= 137th (Mixed) Heavy Anti-Aircraft Regiment, Royal Artillery =

137th (Mixed) HAA Regiment, RA
- Royal Artillery cap badge
- Active: 10 November 1941 – 25 October 1945
- Country: United Kingdom
- Branch: British Army
- Role: Air defence
- Size: Regiment (3–5 batteries)
- Part of: Anti-Aircraft Command; 21st Army Group
- Engagements: Air defence of the UK; Air defence of Brussels

137th (Mixed) Heavy Anti-Aircraft Regiment was an air defence unit of Britain's Royal Artillery formed during World War II. It was one of the first 'Mixed' regiments in which women of the Auxiliary Territorial Service were integrated into the unit's personnel. It defended the United Kingdom against aerial attack until it deployed to Belgium in January 1945 to defend Brussels against V-1 flying bombs.

== Organisation ==
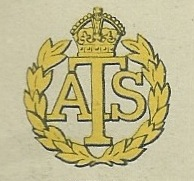
Cap Badge of the Auxiliary Territorial Service

By 1941, after two years of war Anti-Aircraft Command, tasked with defending the UK against air attack, was suffering a manpower shortage . In April its commander-in-chief, Lieutenant-General Sir Frederick 'Tim' Pile, proposed to overcome this by utilising the women of the Auxiliary Territorial Service (ATS). The ATS was by law a non-combatant service, but it was decided that Defence Regulations permitted the employment of women in anti-aircraft (AA) roles other than actually firing the guns. They worked the radar and plotting instruments, range-finders and predictors, ran command posts and communications, and carried out many other duties. With the increasing automation of heavy AA (HAA) guns, including gun-laying, fuze-setting and ammunition loading under remote control from the predictor, the question of who actually fired the gun became blurred as the war progressed. The ATS rank and file, if not always their officers, took to the new role with enthusiasm and 'Mixed' batteries and regiments with the ATS supplying two-thirds of their personnel quickly proved a success.

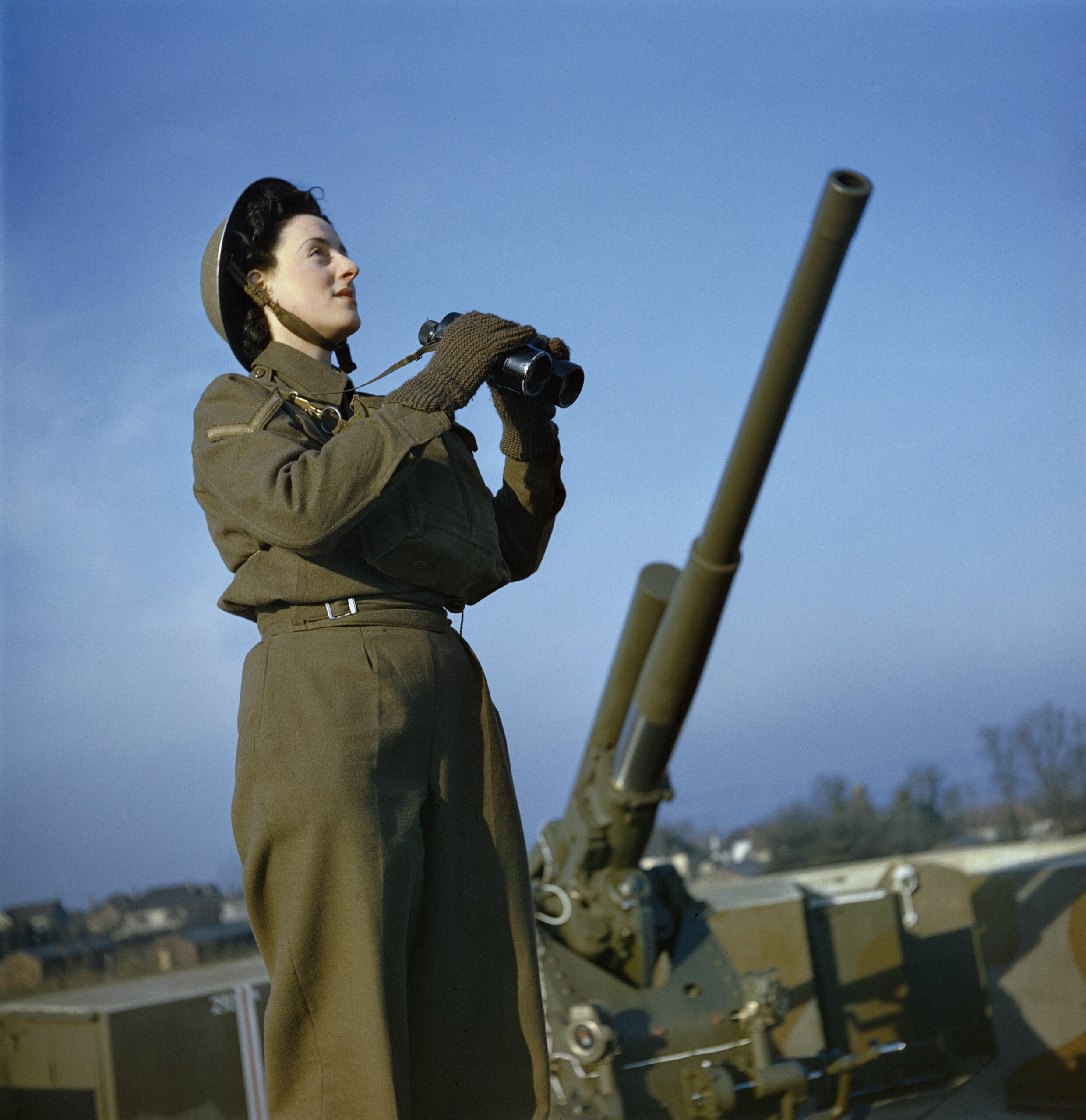
An ATS member of a mixed 3.7-inch HAA gun battery, December 1942.

The first of these new batteries took over an operational gun site in Richmond Park, south-west London, in August 1941, and complete regiments soon followed, including 137th (Mixed) Heavy Anti-Aircraft Regiment, whose regimental headquarters formed at Newton, Chester, on 10 November 1941. It was then joined by the following batteries:

- 476 (M) HAA Battery, formed on 4 September 1941 at 211th HAA Training Rgt, Oswestry, from a cadre of experienced officers and gunners supplied by 115th HAA Rgt, joined on 24 November 1941
- 477 (M) HAA Bty, formed on 11 September 1941 at 205th HAA Training Rgt, Arborfield, from a cadre supplied by 122nd HAA Rgt, joined on 1 December 1941
- 481 (M) HAA Bty, formed on 18 September 1941 at 210th HAA Training Rgt, Oswestry, from a cadre supplied by 101st HAA Rgt, joined on 8 December 1941

== Deployment ==
Formation sign of 4th AA Division.

At the end of the year the new regiment was assigned to 33rd (Western) Anti-Aircraft Brigade in Liverpool, part of 4th Anti-Aircraft Division. On 5 January 1942, 477 (M) HAA Bty transferred to 142nd HAA Rgt in exchange for 487 (M) HAA Bty, which joined 137th HAA Rgt on 1 February (487 was another Oswestry-trained battery, with its cadre drawn from 107th HAA Rgt).

The Blitz had ended in May 1941, but there were still occasional Luftwaffe raids on Liverpool and Manchester, and AA Command continued to expand its capabilities. 137th (M) HAA Regiment sent a cadre to 211th HAA Training Rgt at Oswestry where it formed 574 (M) HAA Bty on 30 June 1942. Then in September 1942, the regiment moved from North West England to the London Inner Artillery Zone (IAZ), where it came under the command of 26 (London) AA Bde in 1st AA Division and was joined by 574 (M) HAA Bty. On 9 November 590 (M) HAA Bty also joined, having been formed at Oswestry from a 1st AA Division cadre and briefly served with 183rd (M) HAA Rgt.

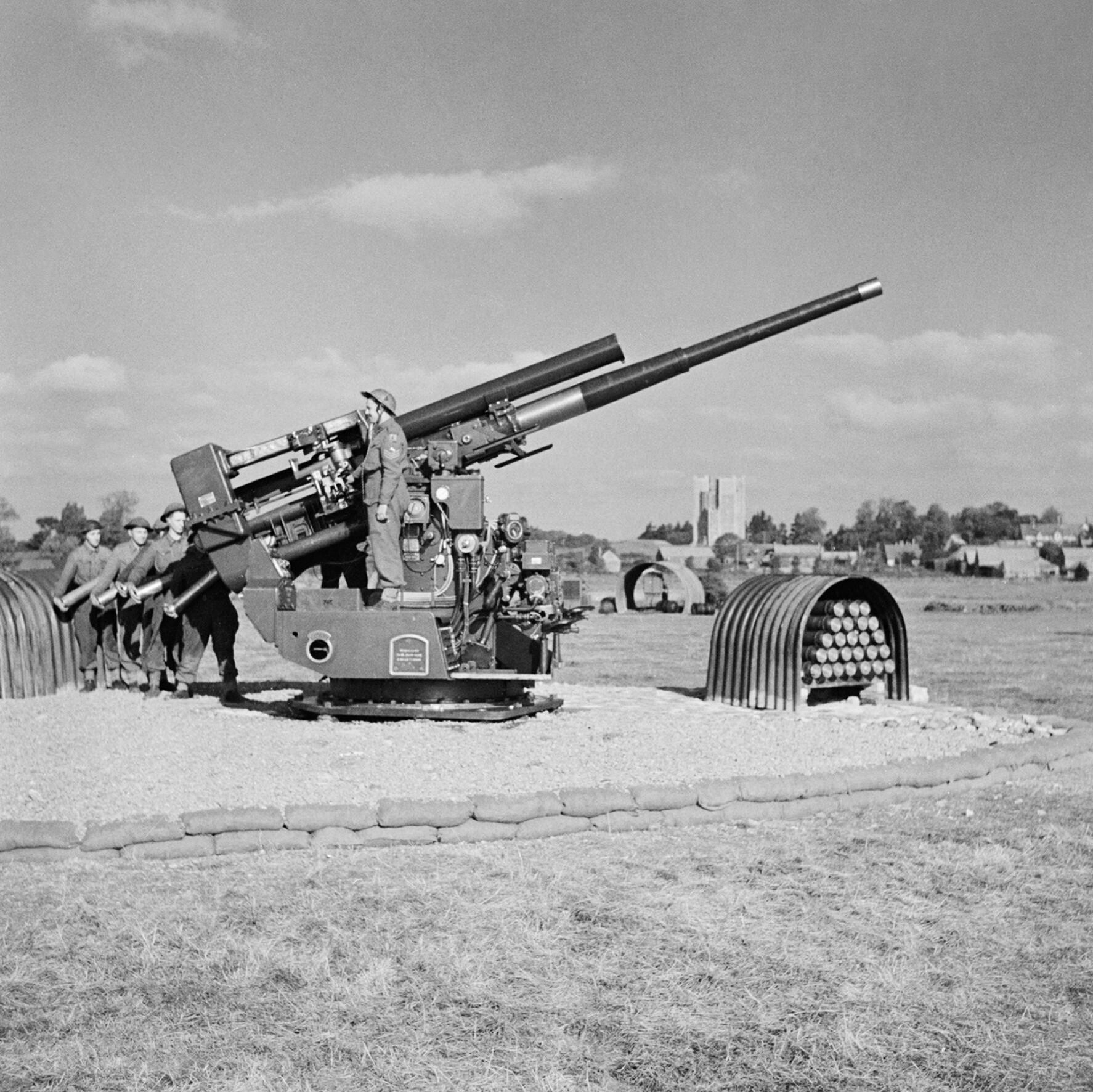
A static Mk IIC 3.7-inch gun on a Pile platform during Operation Diver.

A few sporadic attacks were made on London during 1943, by conventional bombers at night on 17 January, 3 March and 16 April, by daylight Fighter-bombers on 12 March, and by night again on 7 and 20 October. The Luftwaffe began a new bombing campaign against London in early 1944 (the Baby Blitz), when the city was subjected to 14 raids between 21 January and 18 April. By now the night fighter defences and the London IAZ were well organised and the attackers suffered heavy losses for relatively small results. On 13 February, for example, only six out of 115 aircraft reached London, the rest being driven off. Five raids in the third week of February varying in strength from 100 to 140 aircraft were met by intense AA fire from the Thames Estuary in to the IAZ and fewer than half reached the city; 13 were shot down by AA Command, 15 by Royal Air Force night-fighters, and one 'kill' was shared.

== Operation Diver ==
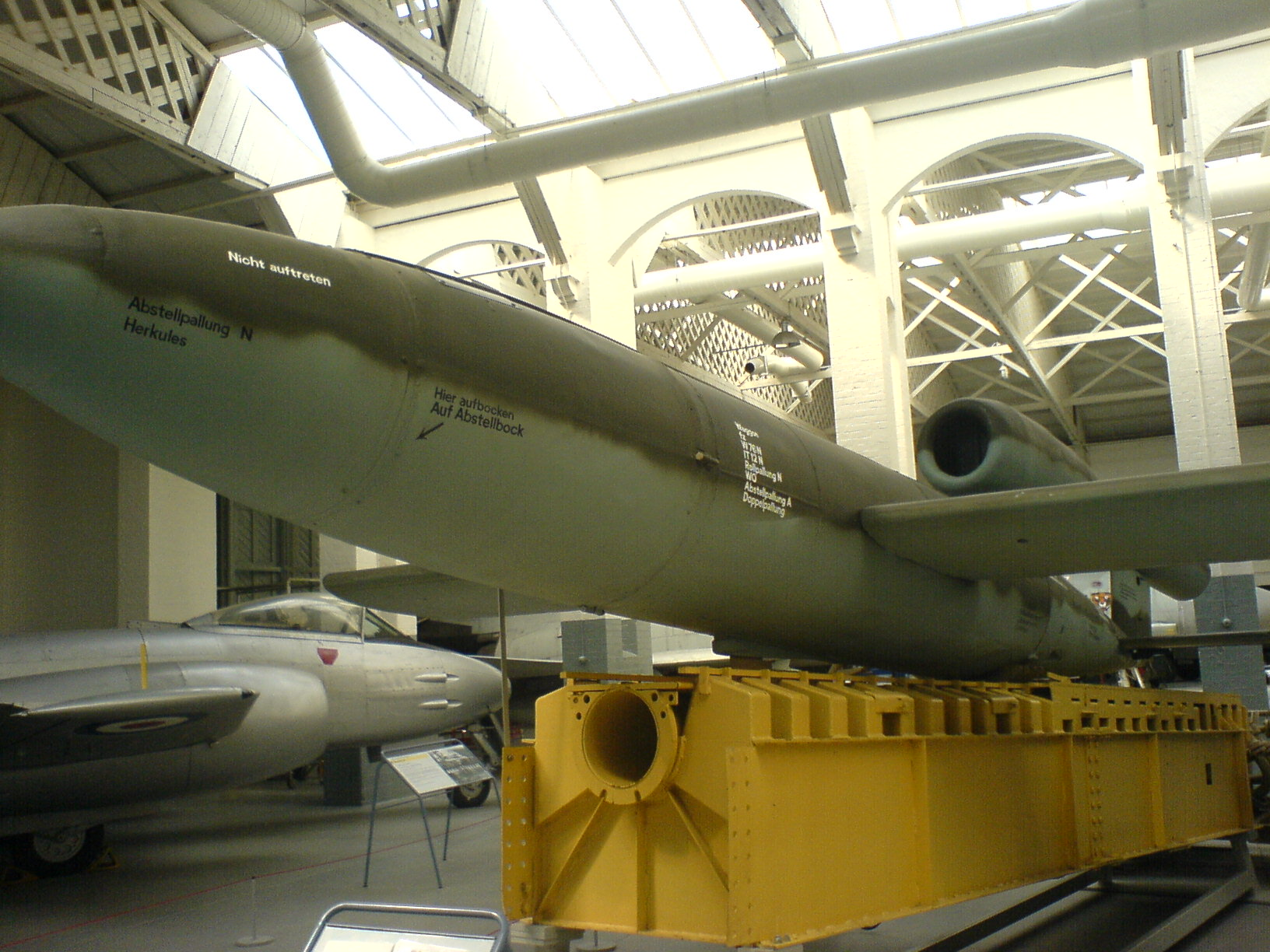
A V-1 and launching ramp section on display at the Imperial War Museum Duxford.

More significant were the V-1 flying bombs, codenamed 'Divers', which began to be launched against London from Northern France soon after the Allies launched their invasion of Normandy (Operation Overlord) on D-Day. V-1s (known to Londoners as 'Doodlebugs') presented AA Command's biggest challenge since the Blitz. Defences had been planned against this new form of attack (Operation Diver), but the missiles' small size, high speed and awkward height presented a severe problem for AA guns. After two weeks' experience AA Command carried out a major reorganisation, stripping many guns from the London IAZ and other parts of the UK and repositioning them along the South Coast to target V-1s coming in over the English Channel, where the gun-laying radar worked best and where a 'downed' V-1 would cause no damage. 137th (M) HAA Regiment remained in the London IAZ, though here the guns stayed largely silent, to the dismay of Londoners. The first 'Diver' offensive ended when the launching sites in Normandy were overrun by 21st Army Group. A second campaign of air-launched missiles coming in from the North Sea led to a second redeployment by AA Command to East Anglia, but again 137th (M) HAA Rgt was unaffected by the moves.

574 and 590 (M) HAA Batteries were disbanded on 16 October 1944, but the regiment was briefly joined from 7 to 30 November by 455 HAA Bty from 129th (M) HAA Rgt before it became an independent battery.

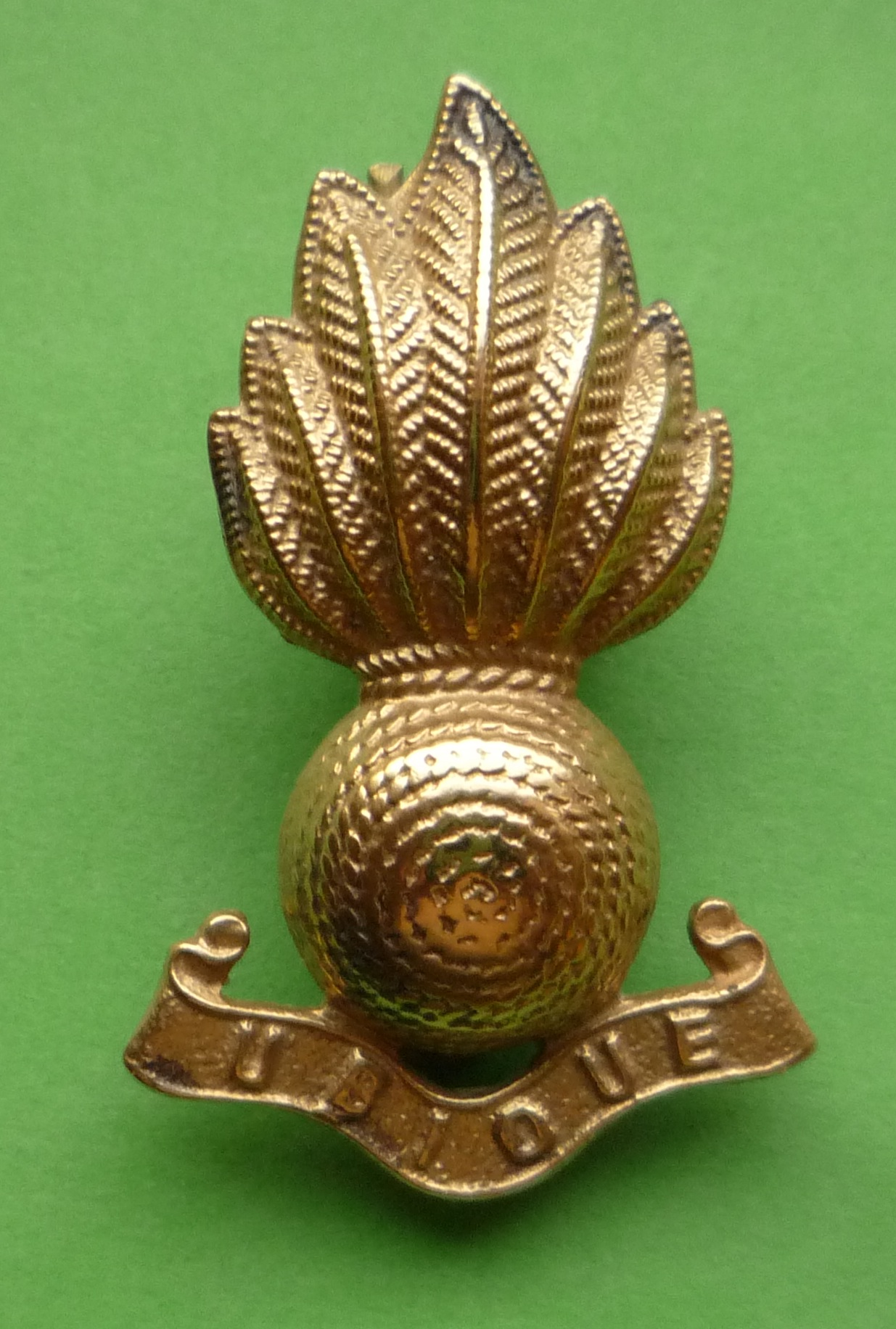
Brass collar badge of the Royal Artillery

== Brussels 'X' deployment ==
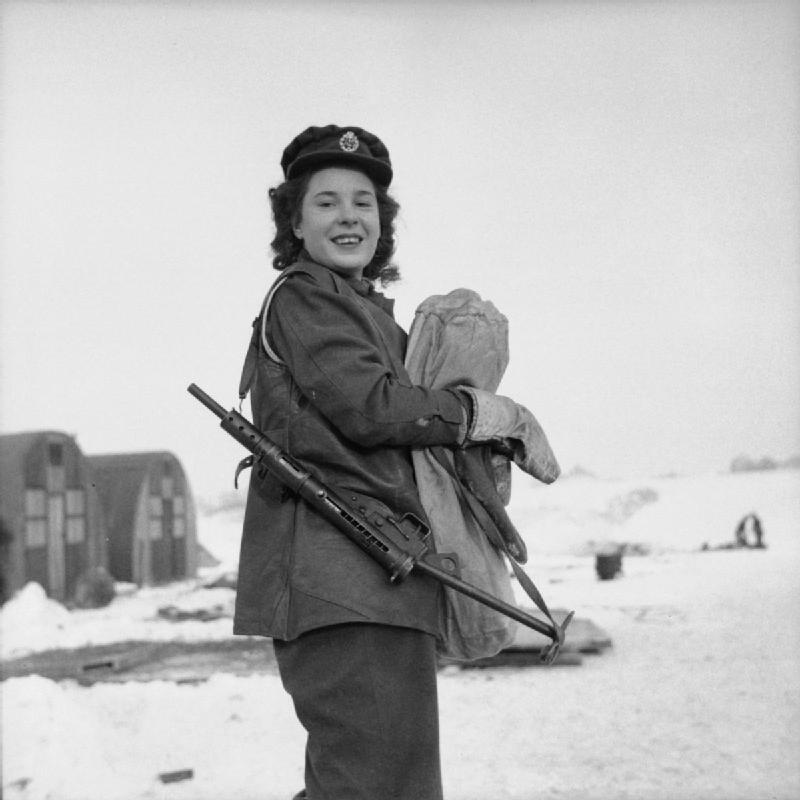
Private Kay Elms, ATS, of 481 Bty, 137 (M) HAA Rgt, wearing the white lanyard (and carrying a Sten gun) at camp in Belgium, 26 January 1944.

Once 21st Army Group had captured Brussels and Antwerp, these cities became targets for V-1s launched from within Germany, and anti-Diver or 'X' defences had to be established. AA Command's experience had shown that the power-operated, remotely controlled static Mk IIC 3.7-inch HAA gun, which had power traverse and automatic fuze-setting, accompanied by the most sophisticated Radar No 3 Mark V (the SCR-584 radar set) and No 10 Predictor (the all-electric Bell Labs AAA Computer), were required to deal effectively with V-1s, but 21st Army Group's mobile HAA units did not have experience with this equipment. 137th (M) HAA Regiment was the first Mixed unit sent from AA Command to reinforce the Brussels 'X' defences in January 1945. It deployed in bitter winter weather: it was so cold that the oil in the guns' hydraulic power systems froze. The Brussels 'X' defences under 101 AA Brigade involved an outer line of Wireless Observer Units sited 40 miles (64 km) to 50 miles (80 km) in front of the guns to give 8 minutes' warning, then Local Warning (LW) stations positioned half way, equipped with radar to begin plotting individual missiles. Finally there was an inner belt of Observation Posts (OPs), about 20,000 yards (18,000 m) in front of the guns to give visual confirmation that the tracked target was a missile. The LW stations and OPs were operated by teams from the AA regiments. Radar-controlled searchlights were deployed to assist in identification and engagement of missiles at night. Unlike the anti-Diver guns firing over the English Channel or North Sea, VT Proximity fuzes could not be employed by the HAA batteries at Brussels because of the risk of casualties to troops and civilians under the missiles' flightpath. The success rate of the Brussels X defences had been low at first, but after the arrival of Mk IIC guns and experienced crews from AA Command the results improved considerably, with best results in February and March 1945. (101 AA Bde handed over command to 50 AA Bde for the last few weeks.) The number of missiles launched at Brussels dropped rapidly as 21st Army Group continued its advance, and in the last week the AA defences destroyed 97.5 per cent of those reaching the defence belt.

The war in Europe ended on VE Day (8 May 1945) and 137th (Mixed) HAA Regiment and its three batteries was disbanded on 25 October.

== Insignia ==
While the male members of the regiment wore the Royal Artillery's 'gun' cap badge, the women wore the ATS cap badge, but in addition they wore the RA's 'grenade' collar badge as a special badge above the left breast pocket of the tunic. Both sexes wore the white RA lanyard on the right shoulder.
