= 30th (Northumbrian) Anti-Aircraft Brigade =

- Active: 1 November 1936 – 1 March 1954
- Country: United Kingdom
- Branch: Territorial Army
- Type: Anti-Aircraft Brigade
- Role: Air Defence
- Part of: 2nd AA Division; 7th AA Division; 6 AA Group; 5 AA Group
- Garrison/HQ: Sunderland
- Engagements: The Blitz

The 30th (Northumbrian) Anti-Aircraft Brigade was an air defence formation of Britain's Territorial Army from 1936 until 1955, which defended Tyneside and Sunderland during the Second World War.

== Origins ==
The formation was raised as 30th (Northumbrian) Anti-Aircraft Group on 1 November 1936 at Sunderland forming part of 2nd Anti-Aircraft Division. Its initial order of battle was as follows:

- 62nd (North and East Riding) Anti-Aircraft Brigade, Royal Artillery (RA) – Heavy Anti-Aircraft (HAA) unit formed in 1936 by conversion of 73rd (Northumbrian) Field Brigade, RA
  - HQ at Kingston upon Hull
  - 172nd (1st East Riding) AA Battery
  - 173rd (2nd East Riding) AA Battery
  - 174th (1st North Riding) AA Battery
  - 175th (2nd North Riding) AA Battery
- 63rd (Northumbrian) Anti-Aircraft Brigade RA – HAA unit formed in 1936 by conversion of 55th (Northumbrian) Medium Brigade, RA
  - HQ at Sunderland
  - 176th (Durham) AA Battery
  - 177th (Durham) AA Battery
  - 178th (Durham) AA Battery
- 64th (Northumbrian) Anti-Aircraft Brigade RA – HAA unit formed in 1936 by conversion of batteries originally from Tynemouth Heavy Brigade RA
  - HQ at North Shields
  - 179th (Tynemouth) AA Battery converted from 150 Heavy Battery
  - 180th (Tynemouth) AA Battery converted from 152 Heavy Battery
  - 268th (Durham) AA Battery raised 1939
- 37th (Tyne) Anti-Aircraft Battalion (Tyne Electrical Engineers), Royal Engineers (RE) – Searchlight unit formed in 1936 by expansion of 307 (Tyne) AA S/L Coy RE (Tyne Electrical Engineers)
  - HQ at Tynemouth
  - 307th, 308th, 348th, 349th AA Companies
- 47th (The Durham Light Infantry) Anti-Aircraft Battalion, RE – Searchlight unit formed in 1936 by conversion of 7th Battalion Durham Light Infantry
  - HQ at Sunderland
  - 386th, 387th, 388th, 389th AA Companies

In 1938 the RA replaced its traditional unit designation 'Brigade' by the modern 'Regiment', which allowed the 'AA Groups' to take the more usual formation title of 'Brigades'. Brig F.C. Chaytor, OBE, MC, was appointed brigade commander on 1 November 1938. Anti-Aircraft Command was formed in April 1939 to control all the TA's AA units and formations. 30th AA Brigade transferred to the new 7th AA Division when that was formed in Newcastle upon Tyne in June 1939. As AA Command continued to expand, 62nd AA Regiment and 47th Searchlight Battalion moved to other brigades in 7 AA Division and were replaced by newly formed units.

== Second World War ==
=== Mobilisation ===
On the outbreak of war 30th AA Brigade was mobilised to defend its home area of Tyneside and Sunderland, with the following order of battle:

- 63rd (Northumbrian) Anti-Aircraft Regiment, Royal Artillery – as above
- 64th (Northumbrian) Anti-Aircraft Regiment, Royal Artillery – as above
- 87th Anti-Aircraft Regiment, Royal Artillery – HAA unit formed at Hebburn May 1939
- 37th (Tyne Electrical Engineers) AA Battalion RE – as above
- 5th Battalion, Royal Northumberland Fusiliers (53rd Searchlight Regiment) – searchlight unit formed at Walker-on-Tyne in 1938 by conversion of infantry battalion

Early in 1940, 37th (TEE) AA Bn left to join the British Expeditionary Force in France. It was one of the last units to be evacuated, from Saint-Nazaire two weeks after the main Dunkirk evacuation.

In 1940, RA regiments equipped with 3-inch, 3.7-inch or 4.5-inch AA guns were designated Heavy Anti-Aircraft (HAA) to distinguish them from the new Light Anti-Aircraft (LAA) regiments, and RE AA battalions were transferred to the RA and designated Searchlight regiments.

=== The Blitz ===
==== Order of Battle 1940–41 ====
During The Blitz, 30th Anti-Aircraft Brigade comprised both HAA and LAA artillery while the searchlight units in the area were controlled by 57th Anti-Aircraft Brigade:

- 63rd (Northumbrian) HAA Regt – as above
  - 176, 177, 178, 269 HAA Btys
- 64th (Northumbrian) HAA Regt – as above
  - 179, 180, 268 HAA Btys
  - 431 Bty (joined Summer 1941)
- 37th (Tyne Electrical Engineers) LAA Regt – duplicate of 37 AA Battalion RE (see above), organised on 28 August 1939 as an LAA Regiment RA; left July 1941
  - 123, 127, 222 LAA Btys
- 38th LAA Rgt (part) – new unit raised on 28 August 1939 in North Yorkshire; shared with 10th AA Division
- 68th LAA Regt – new unit formed December 1940, joined by February 1941
  - 203, 204, 205 LAA Btys
- 7th AA Z Rgt – new unit raised in September 1940, equipped with Z Battery rocket launchers
  - 106, 109, 110, 117 Z Btys

=== Mid-war ===
As the war progressed, many experienced prewar AA units were deployed overseas and replaced in Home Forces by newer units, often 'mixed' units including personnel from the Auxiliary Territorial Service or members of the Home Guard. 37 LAA Regt went first to Palestine in April 1942 and then moved on to North Africa; 63 HAA Regt went to Ceylon in May 1942; 38 LAA Regt went to North Africa in August 1942 and 64 HAA Regt to Tunisia in May 1943. 68 LAA Regiment joined 59th (Staffordshire) Infantry Division in April 1943 and served with it during the Normandy Campaign.

==== Order of Battle 1941–42 ====
During this period the brigade was composed as follows:

- 63rd (Northumbrian) HAA Rgt – left for War Office (WO) Control December 1941 preparatory to embarking for Ceylon
- 64th (Northumbrian) HAA Rgt – left April 1942 preparatory to joining Operation Torch
- 135th (Mixed) HAA Rgt – new unit raised in October 1941
  - 466, 467, 473 (M) HAA Btys
- 136th HAA Rgt – joined from 2nd AA Division April 1942; returned to 2nd AA Division June 1942
  - 182, 198, 409, 432 HAA Btys
- 146th HAA Rgt – new unit raised in January 1942; left May 1942
  - 176, 339, 414, 465 HAA Btys
- 153rd (Mixed) HAA Rgt – new unit raised in March 1942
  - 509, 521 (M) HAA Btys
- 37th (TEE) LAA Rgt – left for Middle East Forces June 1941
- 50th LAA Rgt – left for 6th AA Division February 1942
  - 58, 93, 245 LAA Btys
- 68th LAA Rgt – to 43 AA Bde by May 1942
  - 203, 204, 278 LAA Btys
- 124th (Highland) LAA Rgt – converted from 51st S/L Rgt and joined May 1942
  - 404, 411, 412, 413 LAA Btys
- 7th AA Z Rgt – to 43 AA Bde February 1942
- 30 AA Brigade Signal Office Mixed Sub-Section (part of No 1 Company, 7 AA Division Mixed Signal Unit, Royal Corps of Signals)

=== Reorganisation ===
On 30 September 1942 the AA Divisions and Corps were dissolved and 30th Anti-Aircraft Brigade came under a new 6 AA Group covering Scotland and North East England and aligned with No. 13 Group RAF.

==== Order of Battle 1942–44 ====
Under the new command structure, 30 AA Bde had the following composition:

- 122nd HAA Rgt – from Orkney and Shetland Defences (OSDEF) February 1944
  - 397, 400, 401, 455 HAA Btys
- 130th (M) HAA Rgt – from 42 AA Bde Summer 1943
  - 442, 443, 448, 449 (M) HAA Btys
- 135th (M) HAA Rgt – left Summer 1943
  - 466, 467, 473, 494 HAA Btys
  - 547 HAA Bty – joined November 1942
- 149th (M) HAA Rgt – from 4 AA Group Summer 1943
  - 506, 507, 512, 581 (M) HAA Btys
- 153rd (M) HAA Rgt
  - 509, 521 (M) HAA Btys
  - 513, 544 (M) HAA Btys – joined December 1942
- 170th (M) HAA Rgt – from 42 AA Bde April 1943; left Summer 1943
  - 528, 554 567, 568 (M) HAA Btys
- 124th LAA Rgt – to 2 AA Group by March 1943
- 53rd (Royal Northumberland Fusiliers) S/L Rgt
  - 408, 409, 410, 565 S/L Btys
- 21st (M) AA 'Z' Rgt – new unit formed December 1942, joined April 1943
  - 109, 110, 213 (M) Z Btys

=== Later war ===
In March 1944, 30 AA Bde HQ was transferred to 2 AA Group in South East England. Here it had just two units under its command:

- 183rd (Mixed) HAA Rgt
  - 564, 591, 608, 640 (M) HAA Btys
- 143rd LAA Rgt
  - 403, 410, 413 LAA Btys

==== Order of Battle 1944–45 ====
However, in April 1944 the brigade's reporting line changed again and it became part of 5 AA Group covering the East Coast and East Midlands. A number of its former units returned to its command, and over succeeding months it exchanged units with other brigades in 2 and 5 AA Groups.

- 122nd HAA Rgt – to 3 AA Group May 1944
  - 397, 400, 401 HAA Btys
- 129th (Mixed) HAA Rgt – from 43 AA Bde July, returned August 1944
  - 444, 445, 454, 455 (M) HAA Btys
- 130th (M) HAA Rgt – to 43 AA Bde September 1944
  - 442, 443, 448, 449 (M) HAA Btys
- 149th (M) HAA Rgt
  - 506, 507, 512 (M) HAA Btys
- 151st (Mixed) HAA Rgt – from 41 AA Bde August 1944
  - 510, 511, 514, 516 (M) HAA Btys
- 158th (Mixed) HAA Rgt
  - 540, 541, 572 (M) HAA Btys
  - 548 (M) HAA Bty – disbanded December 1944
- 183rd (Mixed) HAA Rgt – from 71 AA Bde November 1944
  - 564, 591, 608, 640 (M) HAA Btys
- 187th (Mixed) HAA Rgt – from 57 AA Bde October 1944
  - 626, 644, 645 (M) HAA Btys
- 128th LAA Rgt – from 3 AA Group November 1944
  - 421, 422, 423 LAA Btys
- 7 AA Area Mixed Rgt – from 43 AA Bde July 1944
  - 106, 117, 228, 229 (M) Z Btys
- 21 AA Area Mixed Rgt
  - 109, 110, 213 (M) Z Btys

By October 1944, the brigade's HQ establishment was 9 officers, 8 male other ranks and 25 members of the ATS, together with a small number of attached drivers, cooks and mess orderlies (male and female). In addition, the brigade had a Mixed Signal Office Section of 1 officer, 5 male other ranks and 19 ATS, which was formally part of the Group signal unit.

=== War's end ===
By the end of 1944, 21st Army Group was suffering a severe manpower shortage, particularly among the infantry, and AA Command was forced to disband several regiments and batteries, and release their personnel. At the same time the German Luftwaffe was suffering from such shortages of pilots, aircraft and fuel that serious air attacks on the United Kingdom could be discounted, so the War Office began to convert surplus AA regiments into infantry battalions, primarily for line of communication and occupation duties in North West Europe, thereby releasing trained infantry for frontline service. Being stationed in Eastern England, still threatened by V-1 flying bombs air-launched from the North Sea, 30 AA Brigade was less affected by these changes. Nevertheless, in January 1945, 128th LAA Rgt was converted into 628th Infantry Rgt, RA, and went to Europe, while 183rd (M) HAA Rgt was sent to Antwerp to defend that city against bombardment by V-1s.

==== Order of Battle 1945 ====
From mid-February 1945 until the end of the war, 30 AA Bde had the following composition:

- 130th (M) HAA Rgt – returned June 1945
- 144th (M) HAA Rgt – joined June 1945
  - 497, 498, 503 (M) HAA Btys
  - 504 (M) HAA Bty – disbanded July 1945
- 151 (M) HAA Rgt
- 158 (M) HAA Rgt
- 147th (Glasgow) LAA Rgt – detached to 41 AA Bde for agricultural work summer 1945
  - 492, 493, 495 LAA Btys
- 7 AA Area Mixed Rgt – disbanded April 1945
- 21 AA Area Mixed Rgt – disbanded April 1945
- 10 AA Area Maintenance HQ – joined May 1945

== Postwar ==
When the TA was reformed in 1947, 30th Anti-Aircraft Brigade's Regular Army units reformed 8 AA Bde at Newcastle, while the TA portion was renumbered a 56th (Northumbrian) Anti-Aircraft Brigade, (Note: The TA AA brigades were now numbered 51 and upwards, rather than 26 and upwards as in the 1930s.) with its HQ at Washington, Co Durham, and the following order of battle:

- 325 (Sunderland) LAA Rgt at Sunderland – formerly 125 (Northumbrian) Anti-Tank Regt
- 463 (Durham) HAA Rgt at Sunderland – formerly 63 (Northumbrian) HAA Regt (above)'
- 485 (Tees) HAA Rgt at Middlesbrough – formerly 85 (Tees) HAA Regt
- 589 (Durham Light Infantry) S/L Rgt at Stockton-on-Tees – formerly 54th (Durham Light Infantry) S/L Rgt
- 590 (Durham Light Infantry) LAA/SL Rgt at Stockton – formerly 113th (Durham Light Infantry) LAA Rgt
- 654 LAA Regt at Bishop Auckland – newly raised

The brigade was part of 3rd Anti-Aircraft Group with its headquarters in Edinburgh.

654 LAA Regt was placed in suspended animation in May 1949, and 325 LAA Regt merged into another unit in January 1954. Then on 1 March 1954, 56th (Northumbrian) Anti-Aircraft Brigade HQ was disbanded at Seaburn, Sunderland.

In 1955 AA Command was disbanded and the air defence of the UK was reorganised. A new 30th Anti-Aircraft Brigade was formed as a TA HQ from the Regular Army's 1st Anti-Aircraft Brigade, based at Edenbridge, Kent, with no connection with Northumbria. It included 258th (Sussex Yeomanry) Light Anti-Aircraft Regiment, Royal Artillery and 265th, 431st Light Anti-Aircraft Regiment, Royal Artillery, 458th (Kent) Light Anti-Aircraft Regiment RA, 565th & 570th LAA Regiments. It remained unchanged until several amalgamations and re-rolings in May 1961. The brigade disbanded on 1 May 1961.

== External sources ==
- British Military History
- British Army units from 1945 on
- Orbat.com
- Orders of Battle at Patriot Files
- The Royal Artillery 1939–45
