= 37th (Tyne Electrical Engineers) Searchlight Regiment, Royal Artillery =

37th (Tyne Electrical Engineers) Searchlight Regiment, RA
- Active: 10 December 1936–1 May 1947
- Country: United Kingdom
- Branch: Territorial Army
- Type: Searchlight Regiment
- Role: Air Defence
- Engagements: Battle of France; Birmingham Blitz; Baedeker Blitz; Operation Diver

The 37th (Tyne Electrical Engineers) Searchlight Regiment, Royal Artillery was an air defence unit of Britain's Territorial Army (TA) during World War II. It served in the Battle of France, when it was one of the last British units evacuated. It then served in Anti-Aircraft Command, defending the UK, particularly against V-1 flying bombs.

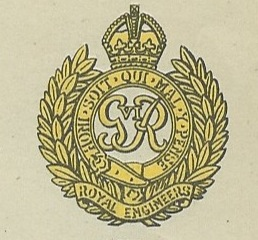
Cap badge of the Royal Engineers (cipher of King George VI).

== Origin ==
The unit was formed in 1936 as 37th (Tyne Electrical Engineers) Anti-Aircraft Battalion, Royal Engineers, by expanding the 307th (Tyne) AA Company, RE, an independent searchlight company based in Tynemouth, near Newcastle upon Tyne. 307 Company was part of the Tyne Electrical Engineers (TEE), a longstanding TA unit of the Royal Engineers (RE). During World War I, the TEE had been the parent unit for almost half the anti-aircraft (AA) searchlight companies formed for service, both at home and overseas. When the TA's AA organisation was established in the early 1920s, one of the TEE's companies was re-converted to the searchlight role as 307 Company in 1924. (The other independent companies were numbered 309–18: the number 308 was kept vacant in case of expansion of the TEE.)

In 1936, as part of the further expansion of AA defences, 307 AA Company was expanded into a full battalion, with the following organisation:

- HQ Company at Station Rd, Tynemouth
- 307 AA Company at Tynemouth
- 308 AA Company at Tynemouth
- 348 AA Company at Heaton
- 349 AA Company at Heaton

37th AA Battalion formed part of 30th (Northumbrian) AA Group (later Brigade) based at Sunderland, in 2 AA Division.

90 cm Projector Anti-Aircraft, displayed at Fort Nelson, Portsmouth

== World War II ==
=== Mobilisation ===
The TA's AA units were mobilised on 23 September 1938 during the Munich Crisis, with units manning their emergency positions within 24 hours, even though many did not yet have their full complement of men or equipment. The emergency lasted three weeks, and they were stood down on 13 October.

When the TA doubled in size following the Munich Crisis, the TEE formed a duplicate unit as a Light Anti-Aircraft (LAA) regiment of the Royal Artillery (RA), designated 37th (Tyne Electrical Engineers) LAA Regiment, RA (TA), which was still in course of formation at Tynemouth when World War II broke out in September 1939.

In February 1939, the existing AA defences came under the control of a new Anti-Aircraft Command. In June, a partial mobilisation of TA units was begun in a process known as 'couverture', whereby each AA unit did a month's tour of duty in rotation to man selected AA and searchlight positions. On 24 August, ahead of the declaration of war, AA Command was fully mobilised at its war stations. 37th AA Battalion was still in 30 AA Bde, but was now part of newly formed 7 AA Division based in Newcastle.

By early 1940, the regiment was at Bordon Camp, and at the beginning of May moved to Aldershot to prepare to join the British Expeditionary Force (BEF) in France.

=== Battle of France ===
The Battle of France had already begun when 37 S/L Regiment began embarking. Battalion HQ and a composite company comprising one platoon from each company embarked at Dover on 15 May 1940 and landed at Dunkirk the next day. They were followed by 307 Company, but the rest of the battalion was halted on the road to Dover and returned to Aldershot. The Composite Company and 307 Company eventually joined BHQ, driving through streams of refugees. However, because of the rapid advance of the Germans, they were withdrawn to take up positions protecting Le Havre (307 Coy with 24 lights) and Harfleur (Composite Coy with 13 lights), under 3 AA Bde while the main BEF was being evacuated from Dunkirk. On 9 June, BHQ and the Composite Coy moved to St Malo, where 37 S/L BHQ took command of the heavy and light AA guns of 23 AA Battery, RA, and was joined by one platoon of 307 Coy from the south side of the River Seine.

Part of 349 Coy had landed at Cherbourg – Maupertus Airport on 19 May and entrained for Le Havre, but returned to Cherbourg after a 900-mile trip round France. 348 Coy had also landed at Cherbourg, on 20 May, and proceeded to Rennes. By now, Le Havre was under continuous bombing attacks, and 307 Coy provided a detachment with light machine-guns and anti-tank rifles to reinforce the land defences. On 10 June, 307 Coy was ordered to wreck its equipment and was evacuated by sea to Cherbourg after the Seine ferry was destroyed.

On 17 June, the batteries destroyed their remaining equipment and moved from Rennes and Cherbourg to the ports at Brest, St Malo, and St Nazaire from where the regiment was evacuated to Southampton, one of the last British units to leave France. Some of the regiment's personnel were aboard the Lancastria when she was sunk off St Nazaire, but all except two were rescued.

=== Home defence ===
The evacuated parts of 37th S/L Regiment were concentrated at Norton Manor Camp, near Taunton, where 307 Bty re-equipped from the part of 349 Bty that had not gone overseas (349 Bty personnel were operating No 8 Reception Camp for men returning from Dunkirk). These lights were deployed round Stroud by 29 June, coming under the control of 46th AA Brigade.

In July 1940, a new 5th AA Brigade was formed at Gloucester to which 37 S/L Regiment was subordinated. This formed part of 5th AA Division but in the autumn was transferred to a new 9th AA Division responsible for the AA defence of South Wales and the Severn Valley.

Cap Badge of the Royal Artillery.

In common with other AA units of the RE, 37th AA Battalion was transferred to the Royal Artillery on 1 August 1940, becoming 37th (TEE) Searchlight Regiment, RA. The AA Companies were designated Searchlight Batteries, and the men's ranks changed from 'Sapper' and 'Corporal' to 'Gunner' and 'Bombardier'.

During the winter of 1940–41, at the height of The Blitz, 37 S/L Regiment was headquartered at Tewkesbury with its detachments in the surrounding area. Enemy air activity was reported as 'slight' and 'small scale', and was mainly over Birmingham, with one raid on Cheltenham on 11 December. RHQ remained at Tewkesbury until September 1942 (with the exception of training camps at Rhyl and Briton Ferry in August–September 1941), with the batteries deployed as follows:

- 307 Bty at Llandaff (operating the 'Cardiff–Newport Dazzle Area')
- 308 Bty at Clanna
- 348 Bty at Hereford
- 349 Bty at Stonehouse, Gloucestershire (provided homing beacons for aircraft returning to RAF Colerne and RAF Moreton-in-Marsh)

On 27 July 1942, the lights of 37 Regiment were engaged during a raid on Cheltenham (part of the 'Baedeker Blitz').

In the autumn of 1942, AA Command was redeployed and reorganised. In September, 37 S/L Regiment redeployed as follows:

- RHQ and Training Bty to Llandaff (relieving 67 S/L Regiment)
- 307 Bty to Blackwood, Caerphilly
- 308 Bty to Alvington, Gloucestershire, then to Blackwood in October
- 348 Bty to Bridgend
- 349 Bty at Stonehouse

The AA Divisions were scrapped in November, being replaced by AA Groups that mirrored the organisation of RAF Fighter Command. By the end of 1942, 37 S/L Regiment was part of 69th AA Brigade in 3 AA Group, supporting No. 10 Group RAF.

37 S/L Regiment remained in position during 1943 into the early part of 1944. Air raids were becoming uncommon, and with the lower threat of attack by the weakened Luftwaffe, AA Command was being forced to release manpower for Overlord, and all Home Defence searchlight regiments were reduced by a battery. 349 Battery commenced disbandment on 25 February 1944, completing by 24 March. However, E Troop of 504 Bty of 79th S/L Rgt and E/459 Trp of 70th (Sussex) S/L Rgt both joined on 3 March, becoming E/307 and E/348 Trps respectively

=== Operation Diver ===
In May 1944, the regiment was transferred to Lambourne in Essex. From June, there were frequent alerts for 'Divers', the codename for V-1 flying bombs. Troops of 37 S/L Regiment were deployed to the Essex and Suffolk coast to support the brigades of AA guns engaging the V-1s. In January 1945, 307 Bty took over a line of 28 radar-controlled searchlights covering Clacton to Lowestoft from 314 Independent S/L Battery. On 3 March, the guns brought down no fewer than eight 'Divers' engaged by 307 Bty. Later that month the regiment redeployed in Norfolk under 56th AA Brigade:

- RHQ at Norwich
- 307 Bty at South Raynham
- 308 Bty at Guist
- 348 Bty at Aylsham

'Diver' alerts continued until the end of March 1945. After VE Day, the regiment moved to Widnes, but 308 Bty remained in Norfolk conducting War Office trials.

== Postwar ==
When the TA was reconstituted on 1 January 1947, 37th (TEE) S/L Rgt with its three remaining batteries (307, 308, 348) was placed in suspended animation at the Militia Camp, Royston, Hertfordshire. The war-raised personnel then reformed the regiment and batteries in the Regular Army with the same numbers. On 1 April, this regiment was redesignated 119th S/L Regiment with 307, 308 and 348 S/L Btys. However, it was disbanded a month later.

Meanwhile, a number of TA units were reformed in 1947 that traced their origin to the Tyne Electrical Engineers' lineage. These included RE units and 537 Searchlight Regiment (Tyne Electrical Engineers) representing the RA heritage of 37th S/L Regiment and 37th LAA Regiment.

== Insignia ==
During World War II, 37 S/L Regiment wore a regimental arm flash of a stylised lighthouse with one beam pointing upwards, embroidered in yellow with a black edging.

== External sources ==
- British Army units from 1945 on
- British Military History
- Orders of Battle at Patriot Files
- Land Forces of Britain, the Empire and Commonwealth (Regiments.org)
- The Royal Artillery 1939–45
- Graham Watson, The Territorial Army 1947
