= 139th (Mixed) Heavy Anti-Aircraft Regiment, Royal Artillery =

139th (Mixed) HAA Regiment, RA
- Royal Artillery cap badge
- Active: 1 December 1941 – 3 May 1945
- Country: United Kingdom
- Branch: British Army
- Role: Air defence
- Size: Regiment (3–5 batteries)
- Part of: Anti-Aircraft Command; 21st Army Group
- Engagements: Air defence of the UK; Air defence of Brussels

139th (Mixed) Heavy Anti-Aircraft Regiment was an air defence unit of Britain's Royal Artillery formed during World War II. It was one of the first 'Mixed' regiments in which women of the Auxiliary Territorial Service were integrated into the unit's personnel. It defended West Yorkshire and the North Midlands against aerial attack until it became the first Mixed anti-aircraft (AA) unit to serve overseas, defending Brussels against V-1 flying bombs.

== Organisation ==
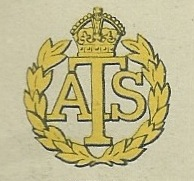
Auxiliary Territorial Service cap badge

By 1941, after almost two years of war Anti-Aircraft Command, tasked with defending the UK against air attack, was suffering a manpower shortage. In April its commander-in-chief, Lieutenant-General Sir Frederick 'Tim' Pile, proposed to overcome this by utilising the women of the Auxiliary Territorial Service (ATS). The ATS was by law a non-combatant service, but it was decided that Defence Regulations permitted the employment of women in anti-aircraft (AA) roles other than actually firing the guns. They worked the radar and plotting instruments, range-finders and predictors, ran command posts and communications, and carried out many other duties. With the increasing automation of heavy AA (HAA) guns, including gun-laying, fuze-setting and ammunition loading under remote control from the predictor, the question of who actually fired the gun became blurred as the war progressed. The ATS rank and file, if not always their officers, took to the new role with enthusiasm and 'Mixed' batteries and regiments with the ATS supplying two-thirds of their personnel quickly proved a success.

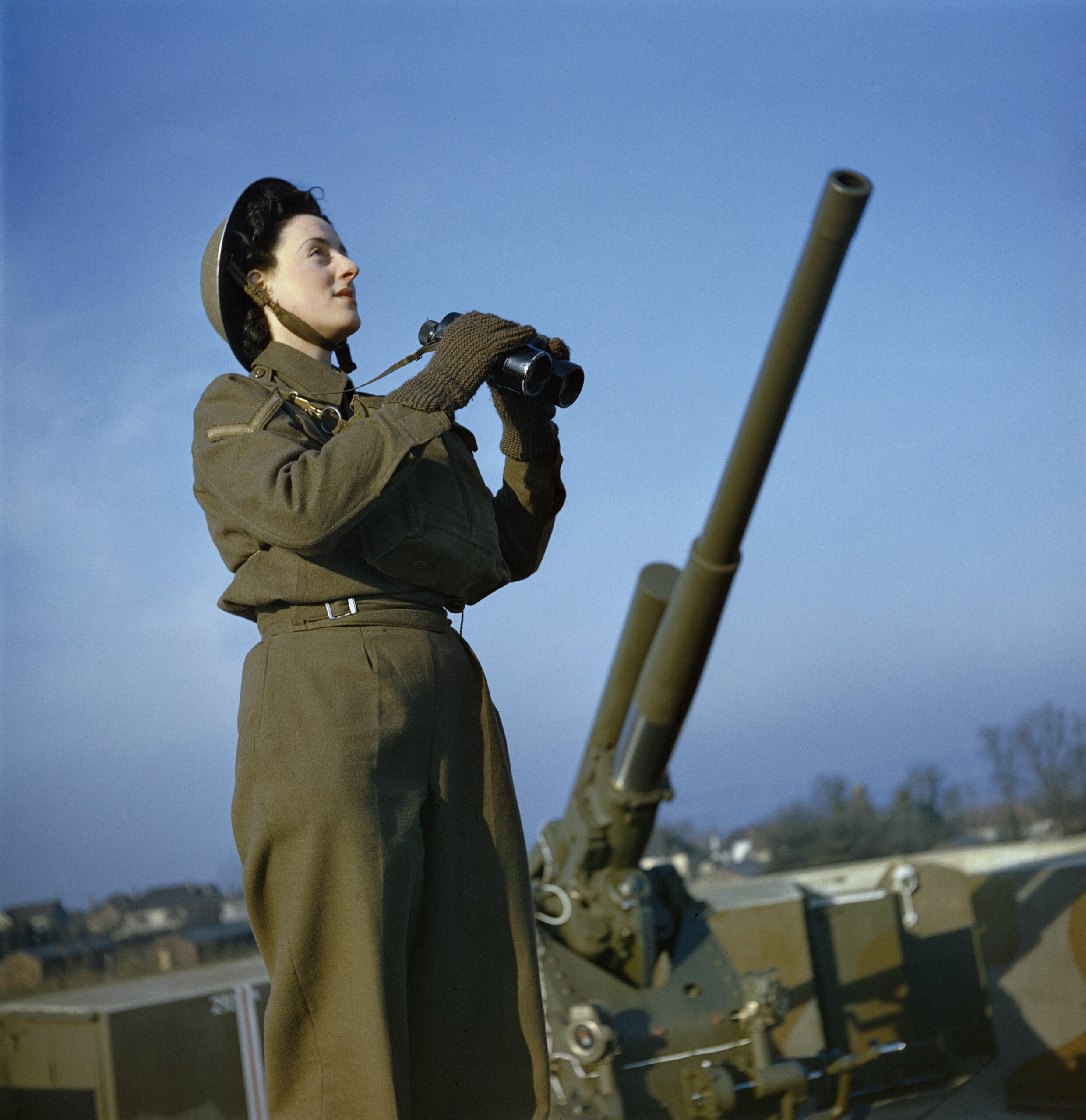
An ATS member of a mixed 3.7-inch HAA gun battery, December 1942.

The first of these new batteries took over an operational gun site in Richmond Park, south-west London, in August 1941, and complete regiments soon followed, including 139th (Mixed) Heavy Anti-Aircraft Regiment, whose regimental headquarters formed at Rotherham, West Yorkshire, on 1 December 1941. It was then joined on 15 December by the following batteries:

- 483 (M) HAA Battery, formed on 25 September 1941 at 205th HAA Training Rgt, Arborfield, from a cadre of experienced officers and gunners supplied by 66th (Leeds Rifles) (West Yorkshire Regiment) HAA Rgt
- 484 (M) HAA Bty, formed on 25 September 1941 at 206th HAA Training Rgt, Arborfield, from a cadre supplied by 93rd HAA Rgt
- 485 (M) HAA Bty, formed on 25 September 1941 at 209th HAA Training Rgt, Blandford, from a cadre supplied by 52nd (London) HAA Rgt

== Deployment ==
Formation sign of 10th AA Division.

In January 1942 the new regiment was assigned to 62 AA Brigade, responsible for the defence of Leeds and Sheffield in West Yorkshire under 10th Anti-Aircraft Division. In February, the regiment was joined by two additional batteries:

- 518 (M) HAA Bty, formed on 13 January 1942 at 206th HAA Training Rgt, Arborfield, from a cadre supplied by 122nd HAA Rgt
- 519 (M) HAA Bty, formed on 13 January 1942 at 211th HAA Training Rgt, Oswestry, from a cadre supplied by 99th (London Welsh) HAA Rgt; in June 519 (M) HAA Bty transferred within 62 AA Bde to 152nd HAA Rgt so that each regiment had the usual four batteries under command.

In the spring of 1942, a new phase in the air campaign began with the so-called Baedeker Blitz mainly directed against undefended British cities. In 10th AA Division's area, York was accurately hit on 28 April, Hull on 19 May and 31 July, and Grimsby on 29 May, but the strongly defended towns of West Yorkshire were not attacked.

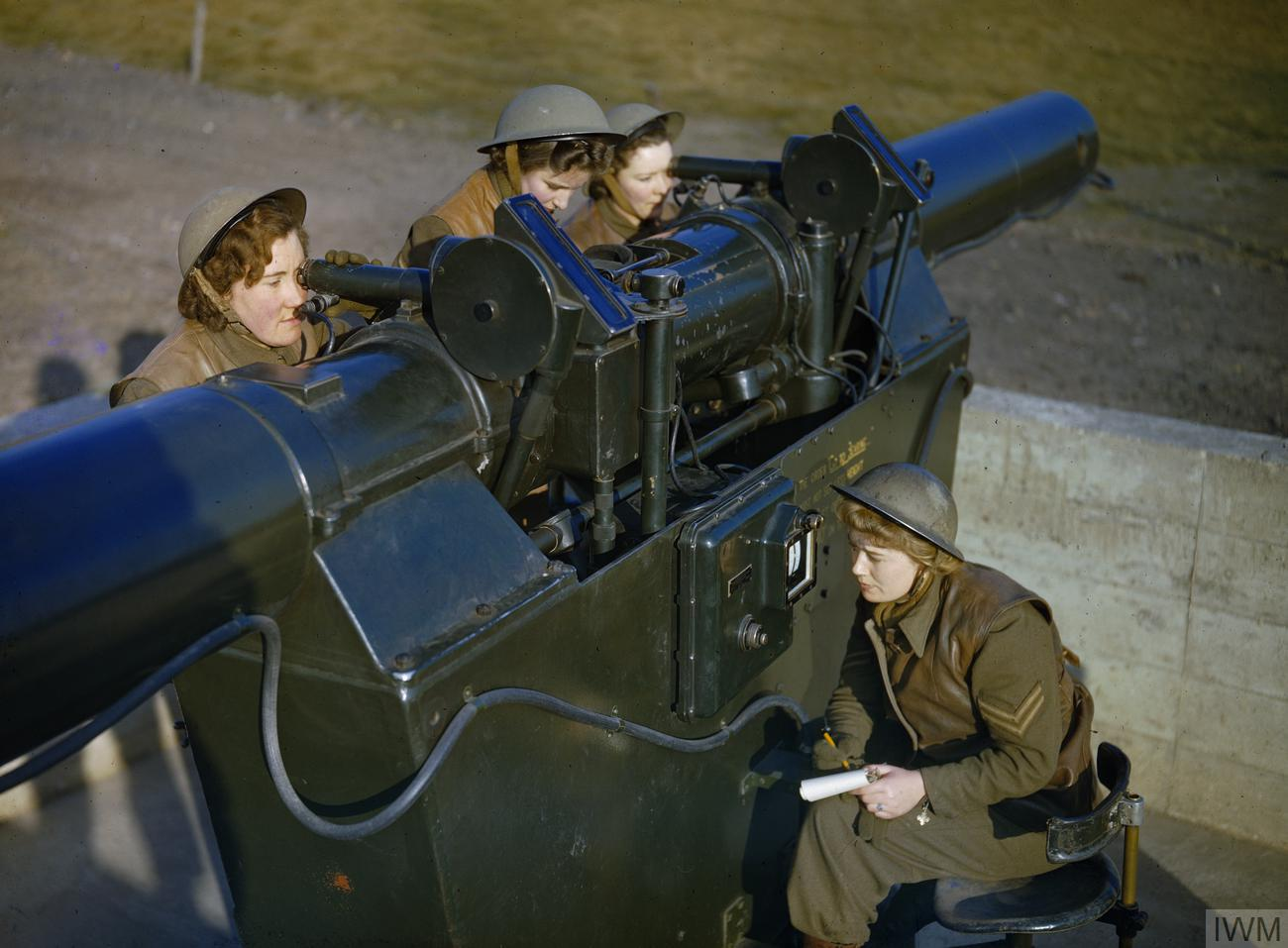
Members of the ATS operating a height and range finder at an HAA gun site, December 1942.

139th (M) HAA Regiment sent a cadre to 7th HAA Training Rgt at Oswestry where it formed 582 (M) HAA Bty on 27 July 1942; this battery served with 172nd (M) HAA Rgt. As new units joined AA Command, more experienced ones were being posted away to train for service overseas, particularly for the planned invasion of North Africa (Operation Torch). 62 AA Brigade HQ was one such, transferring to First Army in August, while its AA Command commitments were taken up by other formations: 139th (M) HAA Rgt came under the command of 65 AA Bde.

In the summer of 1943, the Luftwaffe made a few raids against East Coast towns including Hull and Grimsby, and 5 AA Group, which was now responsible for the region, shuffled some of its units. This included 139th (M) HAA Rgt, which by August came under 32 (Midland) AA Bde covering Derby and Nottingham. It was joined by 668 (M) HAA Bty from 172nd (M) HAA Rgt on 28 August.

In the autumn of 1943, AA Command was asked to make cuts to free manpower for the forthcoming Allied invasion of Normandy (Operation Overlord), and some AA sites in the Midlands were abandoned. In February 1944, 139th (M) HAA Rgt was switched to the command of 63 AA Bde and 668 (M) HAA Bty was disbanded. Shortly after Operation Overlord was launched on D Day, the Luftwaffe began launching V-1 flying bombs, codenamed 'Divers', against London from Northern France. AA Command had planned for this and Operation Diver was put into effect, with large numbers of AA units moving to South East England. 139th (M) HAA Regiment came under the temporary command of 41 AA Bde, which took over additional responsibilities for units left in the North Midlands until 63 AA Bde HQ returned. The first 'Diver' offensive ended when the launching sites in Normandy were overrun by 21st Army Group. A second campaign of air-launched missiles coming in from the North Sea led to a second redeployment by AA Command to East Anglia, but again 139th (M) HAA Rgt was unaffected by the moves.

== Brussels 'X' deployment ==
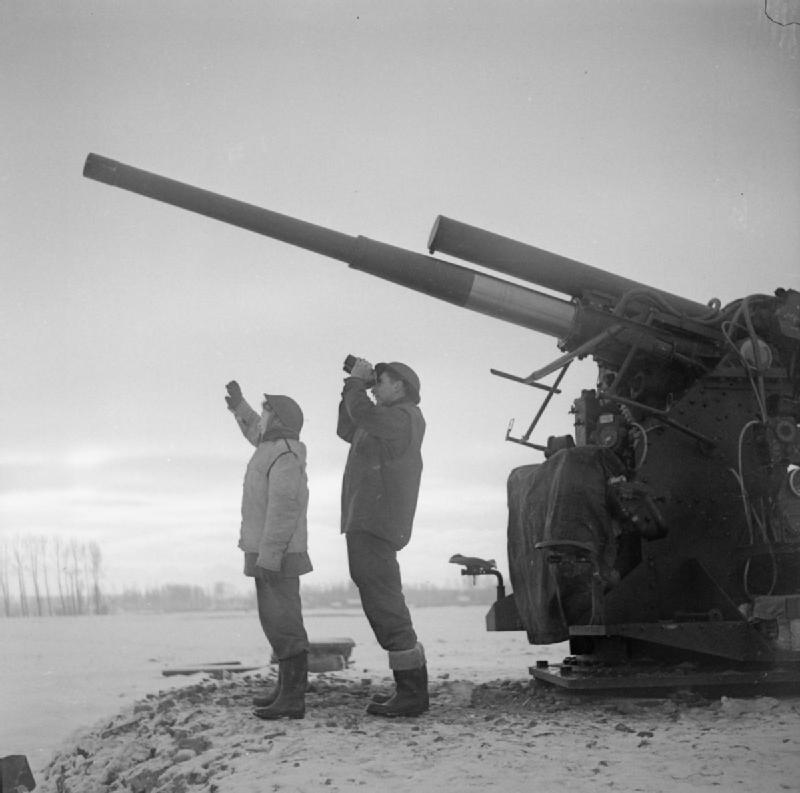
3.7-inch HAA gun of 484/139 (M) HAA Rgt, Belgium, 11 January 1945.

Once 21st Army Group had liberated Brussels and Antwerp, these cities became targets for V-1s launched from within Germany, and anti-Diver or 'X' defences had to be established. The missiles' small size, high speed and awkward height presented a severe problem for AA guns. AA Command's experience had shown that the power-operated, remotely controlled static Mk IIC 3.7-inch HAA gun, which had power traverse and automatic fuze-setting, accompanied by the most sophisticated Radar No 3 Mark V (the SCR-584 radar set) and No 10 Predictor (the all-electric Bell Labs AAA Computer), were required to deal effectively with V-1s, but 21st Army Group's mobile HAA units did not have experience with this equipment. 139th (M) HAA Regiment was the first Mixed unit sent from AA Command to reinforce the Brussels 'X' defences.

The regiment was still deployed around Nottingham in early November 1944 when it was ordered to move overseas at war establishment. This meant leaving behind one battery (518, which became independent) and finding 200 ATS reinforcements to bring the other three up to the required strength. Fortunately there was no shortage of volunteers from other units. The regiment's advance parties arrived in Antwerp on 18 November and spent an uncomfortable week in temporary accommodation under V-1 attack before moving on to Brussels. Here they reconnoitred six new 4-gun sites for occupation by 16 December. These sites lacked all provision for a static HAA gun position: there were no gun platforms, access roads, water supply, drainage or accommodation. The Royal Canadian Engineers erected a few huts for the ATS, while the men slept in tents despite the cold weather. The gun platforms required 2000 tons of rubble to be tipped onto soft ground, with another 800 tons for hardstandings, although the access roads were built as single tracks that were blocked by the gun transporters. On arrival the 15-ton static guns had to be lowered precisely onto holdfasts dug into the ground. All other facilities, including cookhouses and latrines, had to be built from scratch. The Brussels city authorities helped with telephone lines, transport and bathing facilities. Two gun positions were ready for action on 22 December and on 28 December 484 (M) HAA Bty fired its first rounds at incoming missiles. Several other Mixed HAA regiments followed over succeeding weeks.

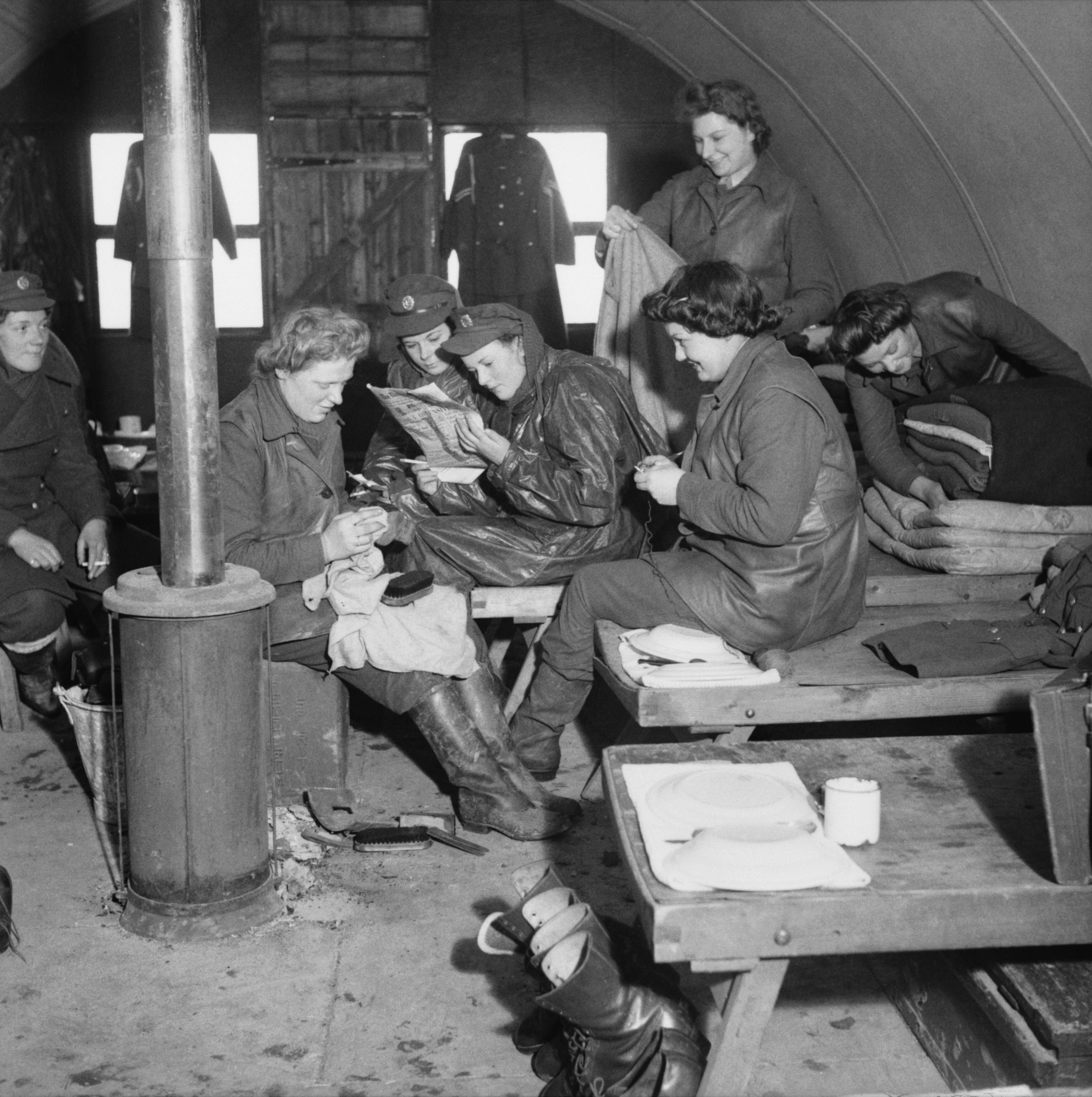
ATS women of a mixed HAA battery off duty in a Nissen hut, November 1944.

The Brussels 'X' defences under 101 AA Brigade involved an outer line of Wireless Observer Units sited 40 miles (64 km) to 50 miles (80 km) in front of the guns to give 8 minutes' warning, then Local Warning (LW) stations positioned half way, equipped with radar to begin plotting individual missiles. Finally there was an inner belt of Observation Posts (OPs), about 20,000 yards (18,000 m) in front of the guns to give visual confirmation that the tracked target was a missile. The LW stations and OPs were operated by teams from the AA regiments. Radar-controlled searchlights were deployed to assist in identification and engagement of missiles at night. Unlike the anti-Diver guns firing over the English Channel or North Sea, VT Proximity fuzes could not be employed by the HAA batteries at Brussels because of the risk of casualties to troops and civilians under the missiles' flightpath. The success rate of the Brussels X defences had been low at first, but after the arrival of Mk IIC guns and experienced crews from AA Command the results improved considerably, with best results in February and March 1945. (101 AA Bde handed over command to 50 AA Bde for the last few weeks.) The number of missiles launched at Brussels dropped rapidly as 21st Army Group continued its advance, and in the last week the AA defences destroyed 97.5 per cent of those reaching the defence belt.

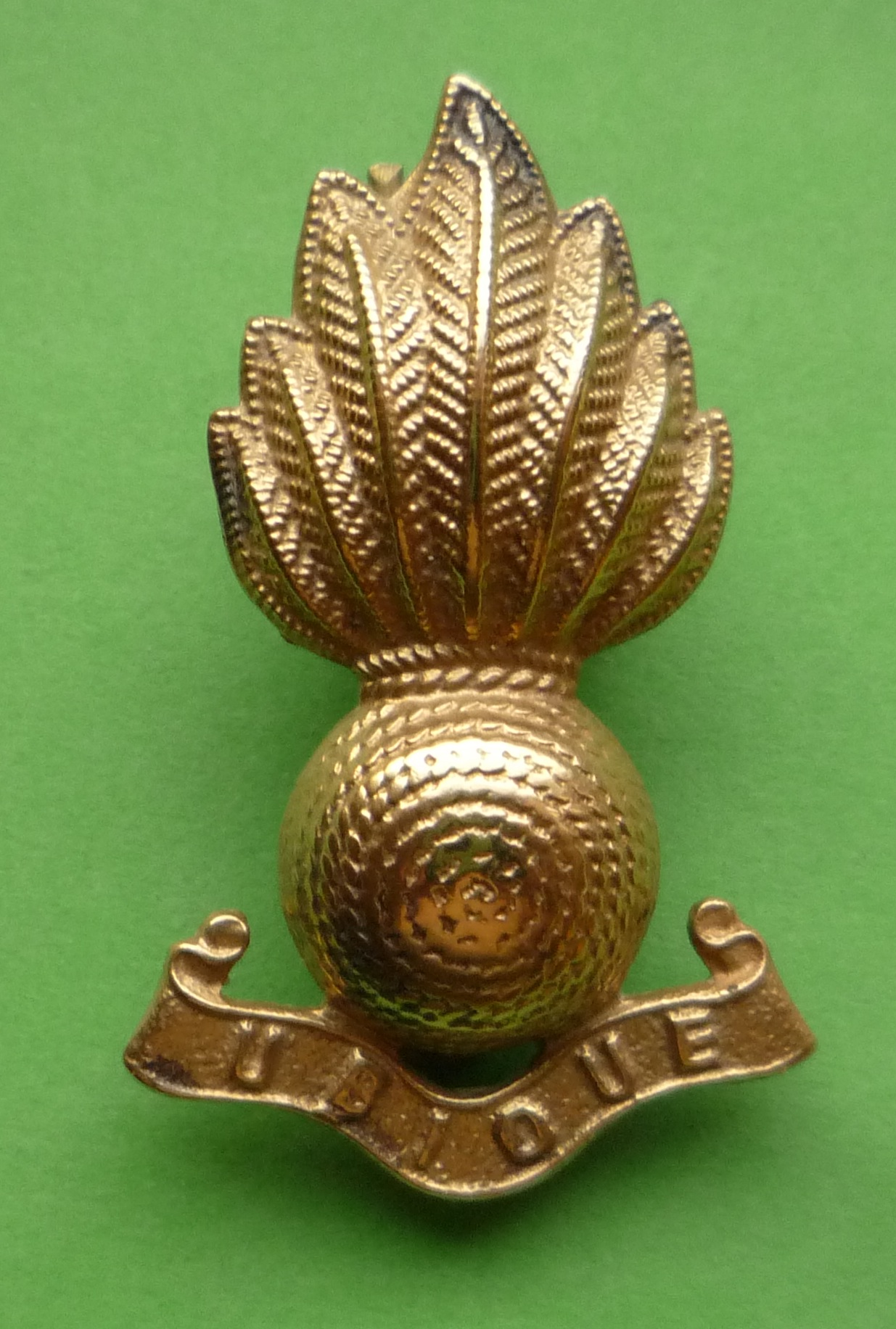
Royal Artillery collar badge

By 27 April, 139th (Mixed) HAA Regiment had been stood down, and on 3 May its personnel were back at Ticknall, near Derby, where the regiment and its three batteries were disbanded, five days before the war in Europe ended on VE Day.

== Insignia ==
While the male members of the regiment wore the Royal Artillery's 'gun' cap badge, the women wore the ATS cap badge, but in addition they wore the RA's 'grenade' collar badge as a special badge above the left breast pocket of the tunic. Both sexes wore the white RA lanyard on the right shoulder.
