= 93rd Heavy Anti-Aircraft Regiment, Royal Artillery =

93rd Heavy Anti-Aircraft Regiment, RA 493rd Heavy Anti-Aircraft Regiment, RA
- Cap Badge of the Royal Artillery (pre-1953)
- Active: 1 April 1939 – 10 March 1955
- Country: United Kingdom
- Branch: Territorial Army
- Role: Air defence
- Size: Regiment
- Part of: 33 (Western) AA Bde; 2 AA Bde
- Garrison/HQ: Birkenhead
- Engagements: Liverpool Blitz; Defence of Faroes; Middle East

93rd Heavy Anti-Aircraft Regiment, Royal Artillery was a volunteer air defence unit of Britain's Territorial Army (TA) formed in Cheshire just before the outbreak of World War I. It served in the Liverpool Blitz and later in the Faroe Islands, the Middle East and North Africa. Postwar, it continued in the TA until 1955.

== Origin ==
Anti-Aircraft (AA) units of the TA were mobilised during the Munich Crisis of 1938. Although they were stood down after just three weeks, the crisis accelerated the expansion of AA defences for Britain's cities. On 1 November, the Liverpool-based 70th (West Lancashire) AA Regiment formed an additional battery (267 (Wirral) AA Battery) across the River Mersey in Birkenhead on the Wirral Peninsula of Cheshire. After Munich, the TA was doubled in size, and on 1 April 1939, 267 (Wirral) AA Bty provided the cadre for a new 93rd Anti-Aircraft Regiment. The new unit was based in Birkenhead with the following organisation:

- Regimental Headquarters (RHQ) at Birkenhead
- 267 (Wirral) AA Bty at Birkenhead
- 288 AA Bty at Birkenhead
- 289 AA Bty at Birkenhead
- 290 AA Bty at Chester

The commanding officer (CO) was Lieutenant-Colonel A.F. Behrend, and among the new officers appointed to the unit on 15 April 1939 was Second lieutenant Howard Erskine Johnston; he later commanded 103rd HAA Rgt and an AA Assault Group at the D-Day landings. Most of the recruits for 93rd AA Rgt came from the shipping and insurance offices and banks of Liverpool.

== World War II ==
=== Mobilisation ===
In June 1939, as the international situation worsened, a partial mobilisation of the TA was begun in a process known as 'couverture', whereby each AA unit did a month's tour of duty in rotation to man selected AA gun and searchlight positions. On 24 August, the whole of Anti-Aircraft Command was fully mobilised, ahead of the declaration of war. 93rd AA Regiment formed part of the Liverpool-based 33rd (Western) Anti-Aircraft Brigade in 4th Anti-Aircraft Division.

=== Phoney War ===
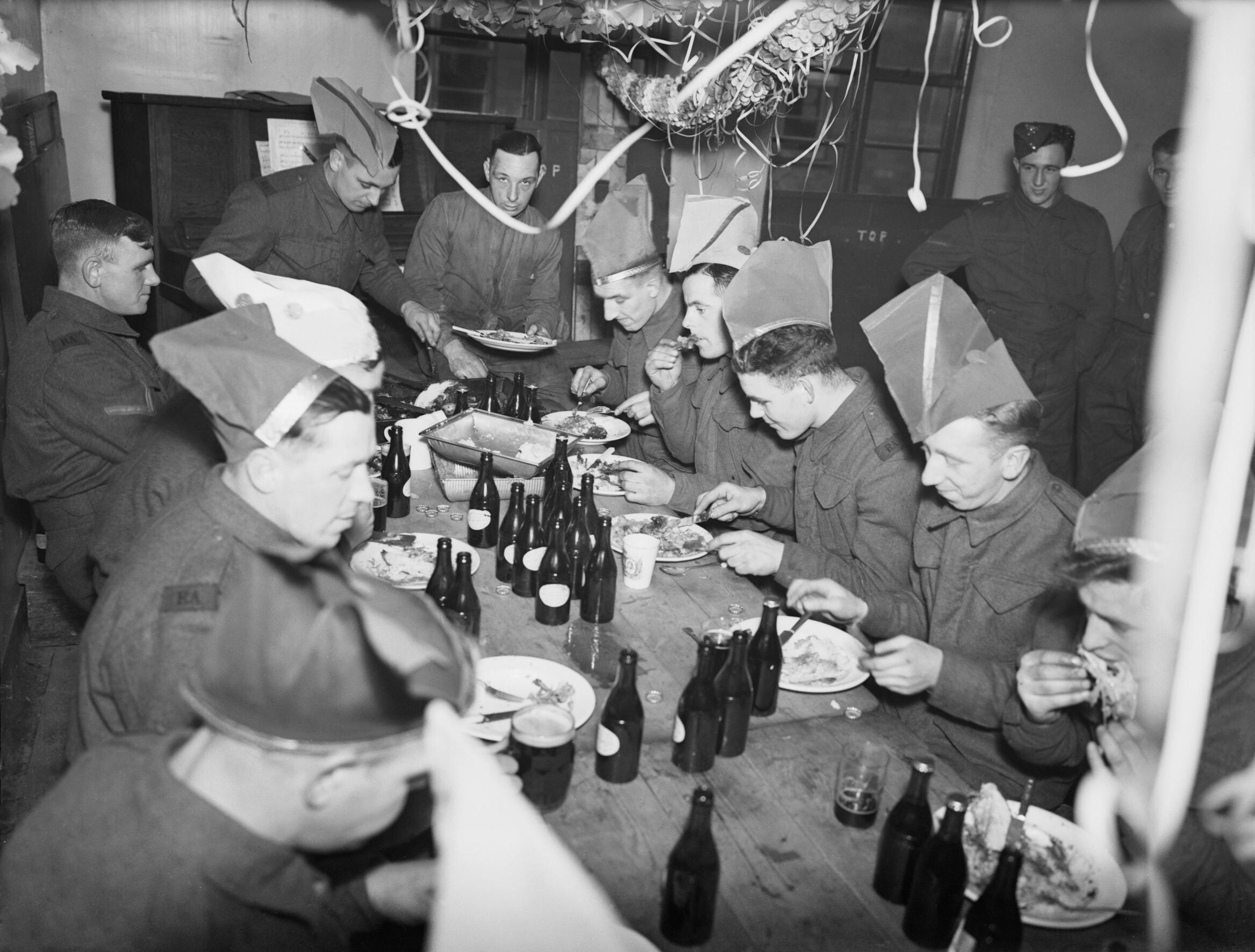
Christmas lunch for the men of 289 AA Bty, 93rd AA Rgt, at New Ferry near Birkenhead, 14 December 1940.

At this point, the Gun Defended Area (GDA) around Liverpool had a strength of just 19 Heavy AA (HAA) guns (3-inch, 3.7-inch and 4.5-inch), plus three guns out of action. During the period of the Phoney War, the AA defences of NW England were not tested in action, and the time was spent in equipping and training the TA units. On 1 June 1940, the Royal Artillery's AA Regiments were redesignated Heavy AA (HAA) to distinguish them from the new Light AA (LAA) regiments being formed. By the start of the Battle of Britain, in July 1940, the number of HAA guns deployed in the Liverpool GDA had reached 52. The first Luftwaffe attack on Liverpool came on 28 August, and there were a number of raids thereafter.

=== Liverpool Blitz ===
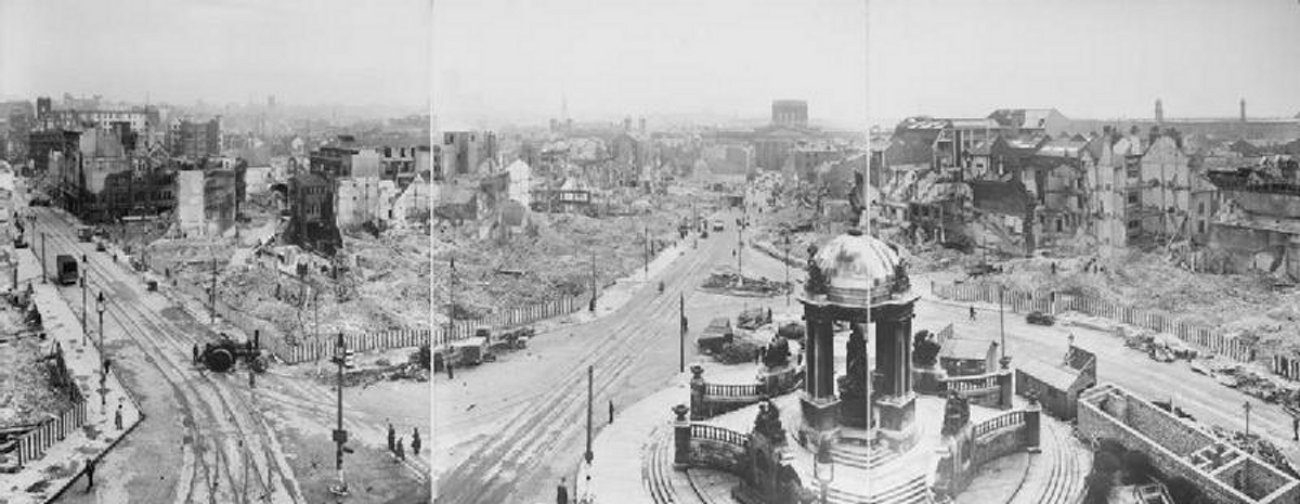
A panoramic view of bomb damage in Liverpool; Victoria Monument in foreground, the burned-out shell of the Custom House in middle distance

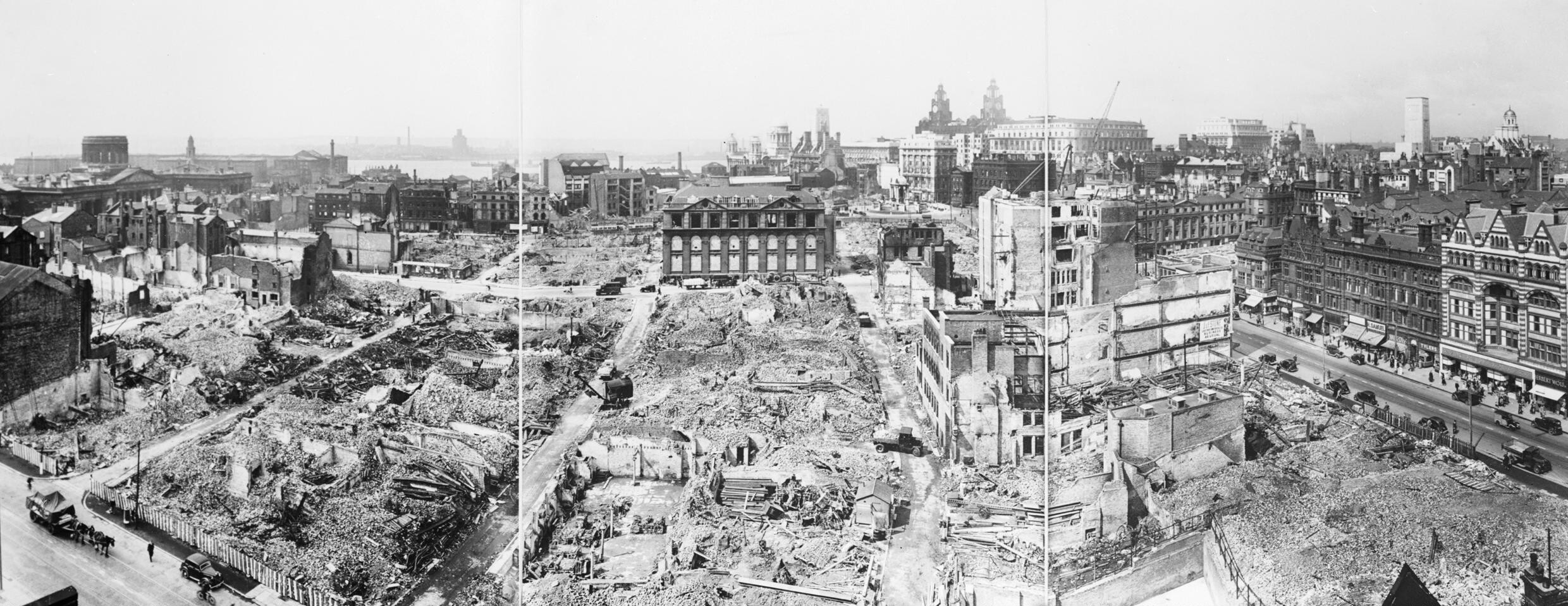
Another panoramic view, looking towards the River Mersey

The cities of NW England were heavily bombed during the winter of 1940–41 (the Liverpool Blitz and Manchester Blitz) and 'the actions fought [by the AA batteries] were as violent, dangerous and prolonged as any in the field'. The wide Mersey Estuary left a gap in the Liverpool defences that could not be fully covered by AA guns, and by mid-1941 AA Command had begun constructing three Maunsell Forts in the estuary on which to mount AA guns.

The night raids continued into the following Spring, during which period Liverpool and its docks along the Mersey became the most heavily bombed area of Britain outside London, with particularly heavy attacks in December 1940 (the Christmas Blitz); in April 1941; and again the following month (the May Blitz).

=== Mid-war ===
When the Blitz ended in May 1941, 93rd HAA Rgt was still in 33 AA Bde, and this continued to be the case for over a year. The regiment sent two cadres to 211th HAA Training Regiment at Oswestry to provide the basis for new batteries: 392 HAA Bty was formed on 14 November 1940 and later joined 117th HAA Rgt, while 426 HAA Bty formed on 24 April 1941 and joined 126th HAA Rgt. Later it sent another cadre to 206th HAA Training Rgt at Arborfield for 484 (Mixed) HAA Bty formed on 25 September 1941 for 139th (Mixed) HAA Rgt ('Mixed' units were those into which women of the Auxiliary Territorial Service were integrated). A final cadre went to 210th HAA Training Rgt at Oswestry for 522 (M) HAA Bty, formed on 15 January 1942 for 154th (M) HAA Rgt.

In May 1942, the regiment was joined by 416 HAA Bty, which had previously been in 81st HAA Rgt in 4 AA Division. As the flow of new AA units from the training centres continued, experienced units began to be prepared for overseas service; the 93rd was one of these. However, units under training for overseas service were often lent back to AA Command. In June, 93rd HAA Rgt moved to 70 AA Bde, and the following month to 44 AA Bde, both still within 4 AA Division in NW England, but by now 416 HAA Bty had transferred to 115th HAA Rgt. 290 HAA Battery was the first part of the original regiment to go overseas, being sent to the Faroe Islands (see below). From the end of August 1942 the rest of the regiment was unbrigaded, (with a brief return to 33 AA Bde during September), before leaving AA Command entirely in December. It then came under direct War Office control until February 1943, when it embarked for the Middle East.

=== 290 Heavy Anti-Aircraft Battery, RA ===
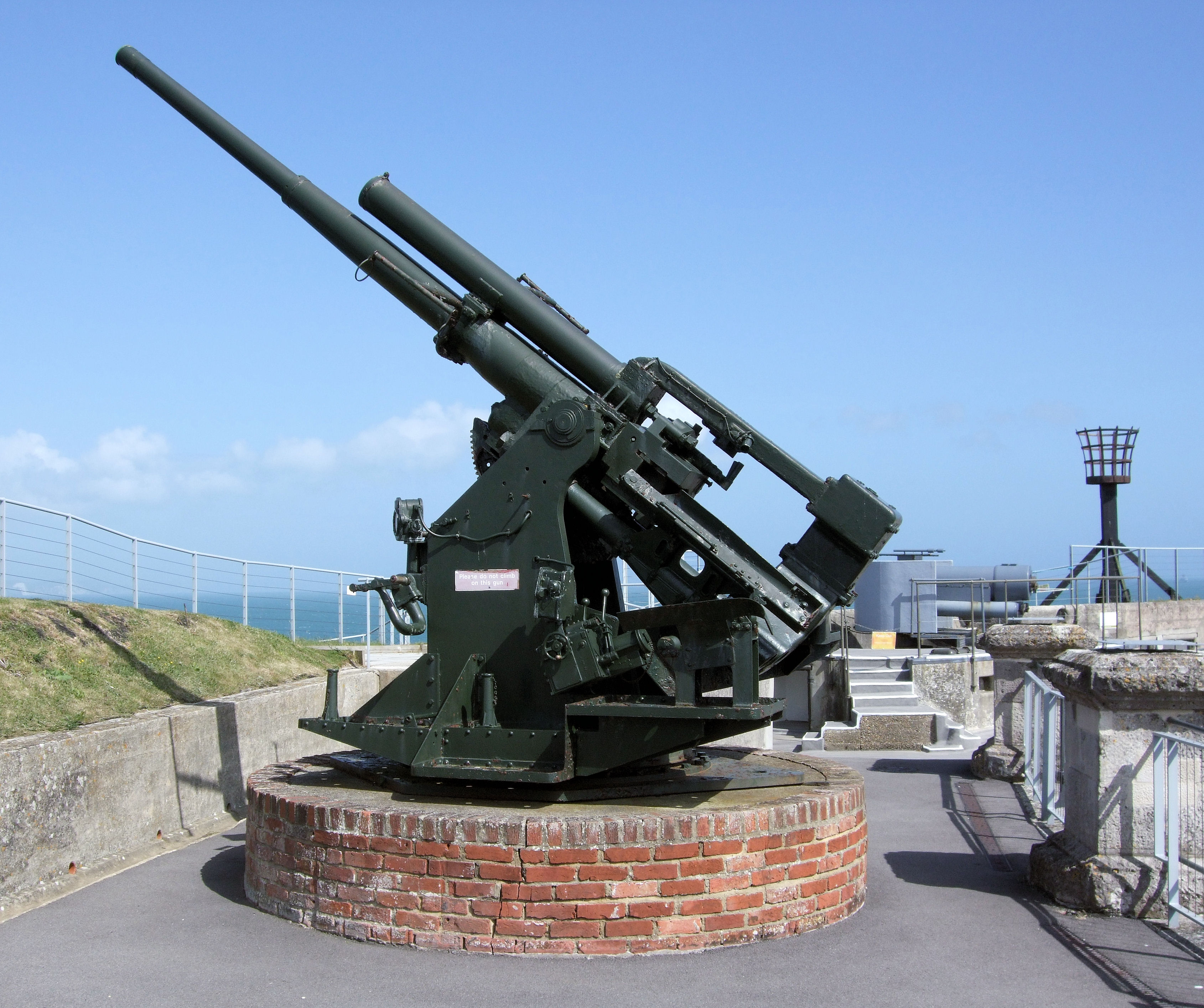
Preserved 3.7-inch HAA gun on static mount.

During 1940, a British force had occupied the Danish Faroe Islands to prevent the Germans using them as a base for attacks on the North Atlantic convoys. The first LAA detachments arrived in July 1941 and immediately came under attack from long-range Junkers Ju 88 bombers based in Norway. The defences were built up slowly: the Royal Engineers built an airfield at Vaago (the modern Vágar Airport). On 1 July 1942, 290 HAA Bty arrived, with 3.7-inch guns. It deployed one 4-gun Troop at Vaago, and the other at the islands' capital at Thorshavn. The guns were on static mountings, for which sites had to be prepared with access roads, emplacements and hutting. These were constructed over two months by Faroese labor. The battery had two GL Mk II gun-laying radar sets and a semi-automatic plotter that gave the guns the ability to engage unseen targets in cloud or at night, there being no searchlights available. On 22 July the battery absorbed two sections of 434 HAA Bty from 70th (West Lancs) HAA Rgt.

In December 1942, 178th HAA Rgt HQ arrived to take command of the AA units in the islands, and 290 HAA Bty was regimented with that unit. A Gun Operations Room (GOR) was established at Thorshavn.

There were almost daily overflights by Ju 88 or Dornier Do 17 bombers and reconnaissance aircraft, but these were mixed with friendly aircraft on patrol or Search and rescue missions, and permission to engage was often denied by the Royal Air Force station commander at Vaago. On many occasions the target could be heard but not seen, or only glimpsed through a break in the clouds. Although the HAA guns fired three or four times in a typical month, often causing the targets to take evasive action, there were no confirmed 'kills'. By December 1943 the air threat to the Faroes had diminished, and the defences could be reduced. 290 HAA Bty handed over four 3.7-inch guns to a newly-formed composite 507 AA Bty, and returned to the UK on 19 March 1943 with 178th HAA Rgt. 178th HAA Regiment was disbanded in May 1944.

=== Middle East ===
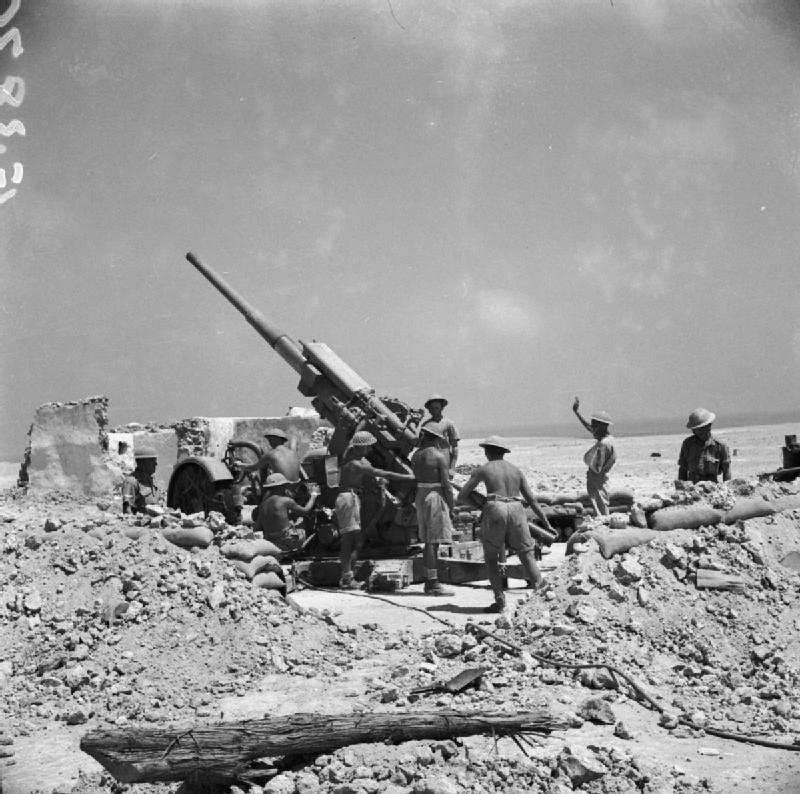
3.7-inch HAA gun in North Africa.

93rd HAA Regiment, with 267, 288 and 289 Btys under command, arrived by May 1943 and joined 2 AA Bde in Middle East Forces (MEF). The North African Campaign was just ending with the capture of Tunis and 2 AA Bde was responsible for AA Defence Area Tripolitania. However, it was withdrawn this month for its units to train for the Allied invasion of Sicily (Operation Husky).

In the event, 93rd HAA Rgt did not accompany 2 AA Bde when it went to Sicily. but remained with MEF. The Middle East AA Group still had considerable commitments in the Levant, in Egypt, and along the North African Coast. It was also preparing to provide AA cover for Operation Hercules, a planned landing on Rhodes following the failure of the Dodecanese Campaign, and aimed at getting Turkey into the war. This was called off in February 1944.

By now, the air threat to the Middle East bases was low and by July 1944 AA manpower was being diverted to other tasks. 93rd HAA Rgtand its three batteries was placed in suspended animation and disappeared from the order of battle on 12 August 1944.

== Postwar ==
When the TA was reconstituted in 1947, the regiment was reformed at Birkenhead as 493rd (Mixed) Heavy Anti-Aircraft Regiment (the 'Mixed' now indicating that members of the Women's Royal Army Corps were integrated into the unit). It formed part of 59 AA Bde (the prewar 33 (Western) AA Bde) at Liverpool.

AA Command was disbanded on 10 March 1955, and there were wholescale mergers among TA AA units. 493rd HAA Regiment was amalgamated with 349 Field and 576 (5th North Staffords) LAA/SL Rgts as 441st Light Anti-Aircraft/Searchlight Regiment, Royal Artillery, with 493rd contributing Q (Wirral) Battery to the combined regiment.3 (M) HAA Rgt 1 January 1947

441st LAA Regiment was broken up again in 1961: the North Staffs btys reverted to the infantry role and were merged with 6th Bn North Staffordshire Regiment, while Q (Wirral) Bty joined 287th Medium Rgt as R (Wirral) Bty. The battery disappeared in 1967 when 287 Rgt was reduced to a single Bty in the West Lancashire Rgt RA as part of TAVR.
