= Suffolk Artillery Volunteers =

Suffolk Artillery Volunteers may refer to:

- 1st Suffolk Artillery Volunteer Corps
- 1st (Lowestoft) Suffolk Artillery Volunteer Corps
- 2nd (Walton) Suffolk Artillery Volunteer Corps
- 3rd (Aldeburgh) Suffolk Artillery Volunteer Corps
- 4th (Beccles) Suffolk Artillery Volunteer Corps
- 1st Suffolk and Harwich Volunteer Artillery
- 1st Suffolk and Harwich Royal Garrison Artillery (Volunteers)

== See also ==
- Suffolk Artillery Militia
