= Horace Martelli =

British Army general (1877–1959)

Major-General Sir Horace Martelli KBE CB DSO
- Born: 17 July 1877
- Died: 11 March 1959 (aged 81)
- Military career
- Allegiance: United Kingdom
- Branch: British Army
- Service years: 1912–1939
- Rank: Major-General
- Conflicts: World War I World War II
- Awards: Knight Commander of the Order of the British Empire; Companion of the Order of the Bath; Distinguished Service Order

Major-General Sir Horace de Courcy Martelli KBE CB DSO (17 July 1877 – 11 March 1959) was a British Army officer who became Lieutenant Governor of Jersey.

== Military career ==
Educated at the Haileybury (1887-1891), Bedford School (1891-1895), and at the Royal Military College, Sandhurst, Martelli won the Royal Humane Society's Bronze Medal when aged twenty for rescuing a boy from drowning at Southsea on 2 August 1897. He was commissioned into the Royal Artillery in 1912, and served in World War I as deputy director of Railway Transport for the British Expeditionary Force, as Deputy Assistant Quartermaster General at General Headquarters of the British Expeditionary Force and then as Deputy Assistant Quartermaster General for 25th Division before becoming Assistant Quartermaster General for 9th Army Corps in France in 1916. He continued his war service as Temporary Assistant Adjutant General at the War Office from 1917 and then as Assistant Director Mobilisation at the War Office from 1918.

He went on to be Assistant Director Quartering at the War Office in 1920, Assistant Quartermaster General at Eastern Command in 1921 and Commander, Royal Artillery for 42nd (East Lancashire) Division in 1925. He was appointed Base Commandant for the Shanghai Defence Force in China in 1927 before reverting to the role of Commander, Royal Artillery for 42nd (East Lancashire) Division again in 1928. His last appointments were as Major-General in charge of Administration at Southern Command in Salisbury in 1930 and as Lieutenant Governor of Jersey in 1934 before he retired in 1939. He was appointed honorary Colonel of the 93rd (E Lan) Field Brigade, Royal Artillery, in 1937.

In retirement he commanded 8th Battalion Wiltshire Home Guard.

Martelli was appointed a Cavalier of the Order of St Maurice and St Lazarus in 1917, a Companion of the Order of the Bath (CB) in the 1928 Birthday Honours, and a Knight Commander of the Order of the British Empire (KBE) in the 1937 Coronation Honours.

== Family ==
In 1904 he married Ethel Mary Douglas.

Government offices
Preceded by Edward Willis	Lieutenant Governor of Jersey; 1934–1939	Succeeded by James Harrison
