= James Harrison (British Army officer) =

British Army general

Major-General James Harrison CB DSO
- Born: 1 October 1880; Welshpool, Montgomeryshire, Wales
- Died: 30 December 1957 (aged 77); Chelsea, London, England
- Military career
- Allegiance: United Kingdom
- Branch: British Army
- Service years: 1900–1940
- Rank: Major-General
- Service number: 26140
- Commands: 2nd Anti-Aircraft Division (1936–39); Royal School of Artillery (1932–34); 55th (West Lancashire) Division (1930–32)
- Conflicts: First World War; Second World War
- Awards: Companion of the Order of the Bath; Distinguished Service Order; Mentioned in Despatches; Croix de Guerre (Belgium)

Major-General James Murray Robert Harrison, CB, DSO (1 October 1880 – 30 December 1957) was a British Army officer who served as Lieutenant Governor of Jersey from 1939 to 1940.

== Military career ==
Harrison was commissioned into the Royal Artillery in 1900 and served in the First World War. After attending the Staff College, Camberley, he was appointed Commander Royal Artillery for the 55th (West Lancashire) Division in 1930, Commandant of the Royal School of Artillery at Larkhill in 1932, and was promoted to major general on 16 July 1934. He was major general, Royal Artillery, in India in 1935.

Harrison went on to be General Officer Commanding 2nd Anti-Aircraft Division in 1936. In 1939, he became Lieutenant Governor of Jersey but held the role only until June 1940 when the island came under German occupation. He retired in October 1940.

== Family ==
In 1925, Harrison married Stella Mary Travers-Smith.

== Bibliography ==
- Smart, Nick (2005). Biographical Dictionary of British Generals of the Second World War. Barnesley: Pen & Sword. ISBN 1844150496.

Military offices
| Preceded by Alan Brooke | Commandant of the School of Artillery, Larkhill; 1932–1934 | Succeeded by Douglas Malise Graham |
Government offices
| Preceded by Sir Horace Martelli | Lieutenant Governor of Jersey; 1939–1940 | German occupation |
