= 1st Suffolk Artillery Volunteer Corps =

1st Suffolk Artillery Volunteers 409th Heavy AA Battery, RA 660 Heavy AA Regiment, RA
- Active: 19 July 1860–22 April 1955
- Country: United Kingdom
- Branch: Territorial Army
- Type: Artillery Regiment
- Role: Garrison Artillery; Field Artillery; Anti-Aircraft Artillery
- Garrison/HQ: Lowestoft
- Engagements: WWI: Western Front; Sinai and Palestine Campaign; WWII: The Blitz; Baby Blitz; Operation Diver

Commanders
- Notable commanders: Colonel The Earl of Stradbroke, KCMG, CB, CVO, CBE, VD, TD

The 1st Suffolk Artillery Volunteers was a unit of Britain's Volunteer Force and Territorial Army from 1860 until 1955. Raised at Lowestoft in Suffolk, it served under various designations, as field artillery in Palestine during World War I and as heavy anti-aircraft artillery defending the UK during World War II.

== Origin ==
The enthusiasm for the Volunteer movement following an invasion scare in 1859 saw the creation of many units composed of part-time soldiers eager to supplement the Regular British Army in time of need. The 1st Suffolk Artillery Volunteer Corps (AVC) was formed at Lowestoft on 19 July 1860 and from 31 May 1861 it was attached to the 3rd Administrative Battalion of Suffolk Rifle Volunteers at Bury St Edmunds. In January 1864, together with other AVCs from Suffolk and Essex, the unit was attached to the 1st Norfolk AVC for administration, and in November that year the 1st Administrative Brigade of Norfolk Artillery Volunteers was formed with four batteries from Norfolk, one from Essex and four from Suffolk. The 1st Suffolk AVC built its drill hall at Arnold Street, Lowestoft, in about 1872.

A major reorganisation of the Volunteer Force in 1880 saw the 1st Norfolk Admin Bde consolidated into a single unit, with the 1st Suffolk AVC due to become No 6 Battery. However, the Essex volunteers were unhappy with the arrangements and left, so the Suffolk batteries were renumbered, the 1st Suffolk becoming No 5 Battery in the 1st Norfolk (Norfolk & Suffolk) AVC, which was attached to the Eastern Division of the Royal Artillery in 1886. The Artillery Volunteers were transferred to the Royal Garrison Artillery (RGA) in 1899, and the unit was redesignated the 1st Norfolk RGA (Volunteers) in 1902.

== Territorial Force ==
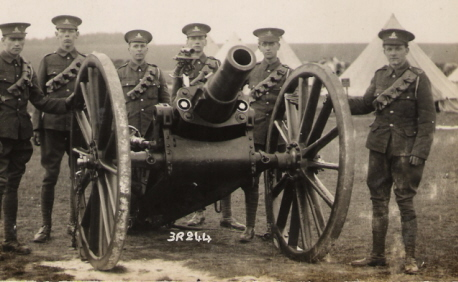
TF gunners with a 5-inch howitzer before World War I.

When the Volunteers were subsumed into the Territorial Force (TF) under the Haldane Reforms in 1908, the two Suffolk batteries were separated from the 1st Norfolk RGA to form the IV (4th) (renumbered III (3rd) by October 1908) East Anglian (Howitzer) Brigade, Royal Field Artillery (RFA), in which the Lowestoft battery provided both the 1st Suffolk (Howitzer) Battery, RFA and the 3rd East Anglian Brigade Ammunition Column.

The Arnold Street Drill Hall was now used by the 3rd East Anglian Ammunition Column, while the headquarters of the 1st Suffolk (H) Battery was at a Drill Hall in Beccles Road shared with detachments of the Suffolk Yeomanry, the 6th (Cyclist) Battalion of the Suffolk Regiment and the 2nd East Anglian Field Ambulance of the Royal Army Medical Corps. The battery also had an outlying drill station at Peddars Road, Beccles shared with the Suffolk Yeomanry and the 5th and 6th (Cyclist) Bns, Suffolk Regiment.

The new brigade formed part of the East Anglian Division of the TF. By 1914 the howitzer batteries were each equipped with four 5-inch howitzers. It was commanded by Lieutenant-Colonel The Earl of Stradbroke.

== World War I ==
=== Mobilisation ===
The East Anglian Division began its annual training on 27 July 1914 and by 3 August the divisional artillery had concentrated at the Redesdale training area in Northumberland. When the order to mobilise was given on 4 August, the units returned to their headquarters and then moved to their war stations. By 10 August the division had concentrated around Brentwood, Essex, and on 20 August it moved to Chelmsford and formed part of the coast defences. Meanwhile, the formation of duplicate or 2nd Line TF units from Home Service men and recruits had been authorised, and towards the end of 1914 the 2nd East Anglian Division came into existence at Peterborough. The original (1st Line) battery became the 1/1st and its 2nd Line became the 2/1st Suffolk (H) Battery.

=== 1/1st Suffolk Battery ===
The 1st East Anglian Division was employed on coast defence until May 1915, when it was concentrated at St Albans preparatory to going overseas as the 54th (1st East Anglian) Division. However, when the infantry departed for the Gallipoli Campaign, the divisional artillery was left behind. In August it joined the 2nd Line at Thetford and Brandon, Suffolk, the howitzer batteries were rearmed with modern 4.5-inch howitzers and handed over their obsolete 5-inch howitzers to the 2nd Line batteries.

==== France and Egypt ====
On 17 November 1915 the 54th Divisional Artillery embarked for France, where it joined 33rd Division, a 'Kitchener's Army' division whose artillery were still under training.

After a month on the Western Front, during which parties of officers and men were attached for training to other divisions in the Front Line, 54th Divisional Artillery was warned that it was to be transferred to Egypt to rejoin its parent division, which had been withdrawn from Gallipoli. Embarkation began at Marseille on 30 January 1916 and disembarkation was completed at Alexandria by 14 February. The divisional artillery rejoined 54th Division at Mena Camp near Cairo and in April moved into No 1 (Southern) Section of the Suez Canal defences.

On 28 May 1916 the 1/III East Anglian (H) Brigade was renumbered CCLXXII (272) (H) Brigade RFA and 1/1st Suffolk (H) Bty became A (H) Battery. On 21 December the brigade was broken up, and A (H) Bty became C (H) Bty in CCLXXI (1/II East Anglian) Brigade (originally the Essex batteries, see above), while the Brigade Ammunition Column was split up between CCLXX and CCLXXI brigades.

==== Gaza ====
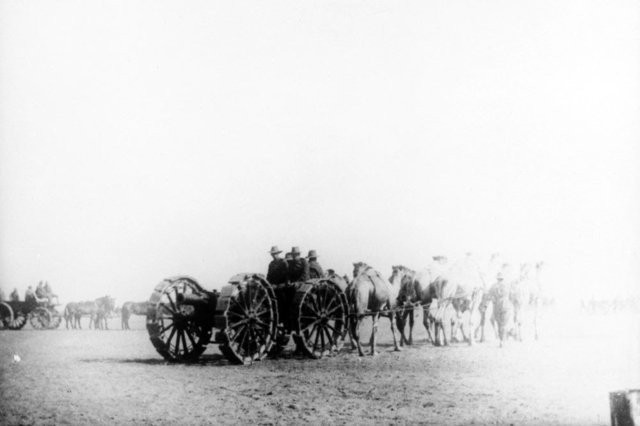
4.5-inch Howitzer with 'ped-rails' (sand tyres) around wheels, as used in crossing Sinai

The infantry battalions of 54th Division were slowly brought back up to strength with drafts from home during 1916, and by mid-January 1917 the whole division had assembled at Moascar in preparation for the British invasion of Sinai. After crossing the Wilderness, the division took part in the First (26–7 March) and Second Battle of Gaza (17–9 April)

On 29 June 1917 the divisional artillery was reorganised again, with C/272 (H) Bty joining CCLXX (1/I East Anglian) Bde (originally the Norfolk batteries see above) as C/270 (H) Bty. On 14/15 and 20/21 July, the brigade gave covering fire for major raids on the Turkish lines.

A six-day preliminary bombardment for the Third Battle of Gaza began on 27 October, with C/270 (H) Bty in No 2 Group supporting 163rd (Norfolk and Suffolk) Brigade. On X-Day (2 November), 163rd Bde attacked at 03.00 behind a creeping barrage laid down by No 2 Group. The brigade was checked by heavy Turkish defensive fire and some confusion because of the dark night, and the Norfolks were unable to reach their third objective, but on the right flank the 5th Bn Suffolk Regiment kept close behind No 2 Group's barrage and overran El Arish Redoubt with few losses. A new fire programme on 7 November began two hours before dawn and led to the Turkish evacuation of the town.

==== Nahr el Auja ====
During the night of 23/24 November the pursuing ANZAC Mounted Division was ordered to seize a bridgehead across the Nahr el Auja supported by A and C/270 Btys. The two batteries moved up rapidly and began bombarding the bridge while the New Zealand Mounted Rifles Brigade forded the river and attacked from the far side 'in a most spectacular charge over a little hill behind the bridge. It was a capital battle' in the words of an officer at 270 Bde HQ. The Turks counter-attacked the following day and 270 Bde was recalled from its bivouacs to re-occupy its positions of the previous day, which A and C/270 managed in 70 minutes from the first alarm. From an observation point known as Z30, effective fire was brought down on the Turks. Thereafter, 270 Bde became the basis of an artillery group positioned to support ANZAC Mtd Division along the river. The Turks made a second serious attack on 27 November, where at Z30, C/270 Bty had one section of howitzers firing in one direction, the other at 180 degrees to it, and both targets had got within 3000 yards of the position. The brigade remained in support of the New Zealand Mounted Rifles Brigade until the Surrender of Jerusalem on 9 December.

During the Battle of Jaffa (21–22 December), 270 Bde supported 162nd (East Midland) Brigade's attack on 'Bald Hill' with a pre-dawn bombardment, followed by a barrage on the enemy communication trenches. 162nd Brigade successfully took the hill, and when 54th Division pushed on at dawn there was no serious resistance.

==== Majdal Yaba ====
During the night of 11/12 March 1918 the 54th Division formed up for an attack on Majdal Yaba. There was no preliminary bombardment: after moving into position in No man's land, the batteries opened fire as the infantry attack went in, and then followed the advance of 162nd Bde, 'leap-frogging' forward by sections to ensure that some guns were always available. 54th Division then took up defensive positions on the height of Majdal Yaba. On 9 April, 270 Bde's guns supported 75th Division's attack against German troops on Three Bushes Hill (the Battle of Berukin).

The German spring offensive on the Western Front led to a prolonged lull in operations in Palestine. In June, 54th Division was warned of a move to France that was later cancelled. In August, preparations began for the Battle of Megiddo. 270 Brigade HQ commanded No. 1 RA Group, including C/270 (H) Bty, while a series of battery positions were prepared and ammunition dumped (800 rounds per gun for 4.5-inch howitzers).

==== Megiddo ====
When the offensive opened on 19 September with the Battle of Sharon, there was no preliminary bombardment: the guns moved up close to the line during darkness, and then their opening fire at 04.30 was the signal for the infantry to advance. The field guns bombarded the enemy line until the infantry arrived, then while the 18-pounders fired a creeping barrage for the continued advance, the howitzers switched to firing on specific targets. C/270 (H) Bty was now in Left RA Group of 4.5-inch howitzer batteries supporting 161st (Essex) Brigade. After the timed barrage programme, the guns moved forward again under fire. By about 14.00, 161st Bde had secured all its objectives and 162nd Bde had passed through towards the final objectives. Despite the retaliatory fire, 270 Bde suffered no casualties in this final action.

The division was then taken out of the line and concentrated at Haifa, where it was engaged in repairing communications for the rapidly advancing army. It next moved to Beirut, where it was concentrating when the Armistice of Mudros was signed with Turkey and hostilities ended on 31 October.

In late November 1918 the division was ordered to return to Egypt, the artillery proceeding by sea and arriving in mid-December. Demobilisation began in January 1919, but in March, after its guns had been handed in and about one-third of its men had left, 54th Divisional Artillery was converted into an ad hoc cavalry regiment to act as mounted police during disturbances in Cairo. Demobilisation recommenced in May and was completed in June.

=== 2/1st Suffolk Battery ===
Training for the 2nd Line artillery was hindered by the shortage of equipment, and several months passed before guns, horses and harness were received. Even then, only obsolete French De Bange 90 mm cannon were available for training. Early in 1915 the 2nd East Anglian Division (which was numbered 69th in August 1915) concentrated round Thetford, where it formed part of First Army in Central Force. The divisional artillery was distributed around Brandon, Cambridge and Tuddenham. In November the 2/III East Anglian Brigade took over the 5-inch howitzers released by its 1st Line (see above).

In May 1916, the 2/III East Anglian Brigade was numbered CCCXLVII (347) (H) Bde and 2/1st Suffolk (Howitzer) Bty became A (H) Bty. Later in the year the brigade was broken up and it became D (H) Bty in CCCXLV (345) Bde. In June 69th Division was transferred to Northern Command and moved to Harrogate in North Yorkshire.

In October the battery swapped places with 536 (H) Battery at Cowshott near Aldershot. This was one of a number of new howitzer batteries formed at the TF Reserve Brigades on 30 June 1916; 536 (H) Battery had been formed at No 5 Reserve Brigade at Glasgow. The two batteries swapped equipment and changed identities: D (H) CCCXLV became 536 (2/1st Suffolk) (H) Bty, while the original 536 (H) Bty was renumbered 544 (H) Bty and continued to be administered by the Glasgow TF Association, but became D (H)/CCCXLV with 69th Division. (Note: The Army Council Instruction referred to 2/1st Suffolk Bty as D (H)/CCCXLVI, but other sources make clear that this was the designation applied to 2/2nd Suffolk Bty.)

==== 32nd Division ====
536 (2/1st Suffolk) (H) Bty went to France equipped with four 4.5-inch howitzers and on 10 October it joined CLV (West Yorkshire) Bde in 32nd Divisional Artillery (32nd DA), a New Army formation, becoming C (H)/CLV Bty.

Shortly afterwards 32nd Division was engaged in the Battle of the Ancre, the final phase of the Somme Offensive. A mass of artillery was assembled, including 32nd Division's, to support an attack by V Corps. CLV Brigade was deployed around the position known as 'White City', where it suffered casualties from counter-battery fire. Seven days of bombardment and wire-cutting preceded the attack, which employed a full creeping barrage. The initial pre-dawn attack was a partial success, and attacks continued over succeeding days. 32nd Division's infantry came into the line on 17 November and attacked 'Munich Trench' the following day, though they were quickly stopped by machine gun fire. The battle ended on 18 November, with minor operations continuing through the winter. CLV Brigade was pulled out of White City to safer positions by 21 November, and the divisional artillery was relieved on 6 December. It moved to the St Ouen area, with CLV Bde billeted in nearby village of St Léger

CLV Brigade left 32nd Division and became an Army Field Artillery (AFA) brigade on 16 January 1917. However, C (H) Bty (formerly 536 (2/1st Suffolk) Bty) remained behind and was split up to bring the howitzer batteries of the remaining 32nd DA brigades (CLXI (Yorkshire) and CLXVIII (Huddersfield)) up to six guns each. The former 2nd Line TF gunners fought with these New Army batteries for the rest of the war, including following up the German withdrawal to the Hindenburg Line, the Battle of Messines, the Defence of Nieuport, the German spring offensive and the final Hundred Days Offensive. The units were disbanded in 1919.

=== 3/1st Suffolk Battery ===
The 3rd Line Depot brigade (3/III East Anglian Brigade) was formed early in March 1915. At first, training had to be carried out without any guns, harness or horses. In May the unit was affiliated to No 4 TF Artillery School at High Wycombe. The Artillery School took over training while the 3/IIIrd became a holding and draft-finding unit. The 3rd Line East Anglian brigades were merged into the school in August 1916, when it became 4th Reserve Brigade, RFA (TF).

== Interwar ==
When the TF was reconstituted as the Territorial Army (TA) in 1921, the former III East Anglian Brigade was amalgamated with the Suffolk Yeomanry to form 103rd (Suffolk) Brigade RFA in 54th (East Anglian) Division. However, this was broken up again in 1923, the Yeomanry batteries moving to 108th (Suffolk and Norfolk Yeomanry) Bde RFA, leaving 103rd Bde as an 'Army' unit of the Royal Artillery (RA) in 54th Divisional Area, with the following composition:

103rd (Suffolk) (Army) Field Brigade, RA

- HQ at Drill Hall, Great Gipping Street, Ipswich
- 409 (Suffolk) Bty at Pedders Lane, Beccles
- 410 (Suffolk) Bty (Howitzer) at Ipswich

=== Anti-Aircraft role ===
However, the 103rd Fd Bde was itself broken up on 1 October 1932. The HQ was disbanded and the howitzer battery joined 58th (Suffolk) Medium Brigade (formerly the 6th (Cyclist) Bn Suffolk Regiment) at Ipswich. The senior battery returned to Lowestoft and converted to the Anti-Aircraft (AA) role as an independent 175th Battery, shortly redesignated 409th (Suffolk) Anti-Aircraft Battery, RA. The Earl of Stradbroke became Honorary Colonel of the battery.

On 1 November 1938, the 84th (1st East Anglian) Field Bde (formerly the 1st Norfolk AVC, see above) was also converted to the AA role as 78th (1st East Anglian) Anti-Aircraft Regiment, RA, and 409th (Suffolk) Independent AA Bty was regimented with it.

The regiment was assigned to 41st (London) Anti-Aircraft Brigade in 2nd AA Division.

== World War II ==
=== Mobilisation ===
In February 1939 the TA's AA defences came under the control of a new Anti-Aircraft Command. In June, as the international situation worsened, a partial mobilisation of the TA was begun in a process known as 'couverture', whereby each AA unit did a month's tour of duty in rotation to man selected AA gun positions. On 24 August, ahead of the declaration of war, AA Command was fully mobilised at its war stations, which in the case of 41st (London) AA Bde was in East Anglia.

=== Blitz ===
In 1940 the AA regiments equipped with 3-inch or newer 3.7-inch guns were redesignated 'Heavy AA' regiments. During The Blitz, from Autumn 1940 to February 1941, 78th HAA Rgt was split up into detachments between 32nd (Midland), 40th and 41st (London) AA Bdes, covering airfields in East Anglia and the East Midlands under 2nd AA Division. By May 1941 the regiment was concentrated in 40th AA Bde.

=== Mid-War ===
On 6 October 1941, 409 (Suffolk) HAA Bty left to join a newly formed 136th HAA Rgt in 32nd AA Bde.

At the beginning of April 1942, 136th HAA Rgt moved to 30th (Northumbrian) AA Bde in 7th AA Division covering North East England, but by the end of June it was back in the East Midlands with 32nd AA Bde.

In early 1943, 409 HAA Bty was detached from the regiment and attached to 50th AA Bde covering Derby and Nottingham. In May, the whole of 136th HAA Rgt moved south to join 37th AA Bde along the north side of the Thames Estuary.

=== Baby Blitz and Operation Diver ===
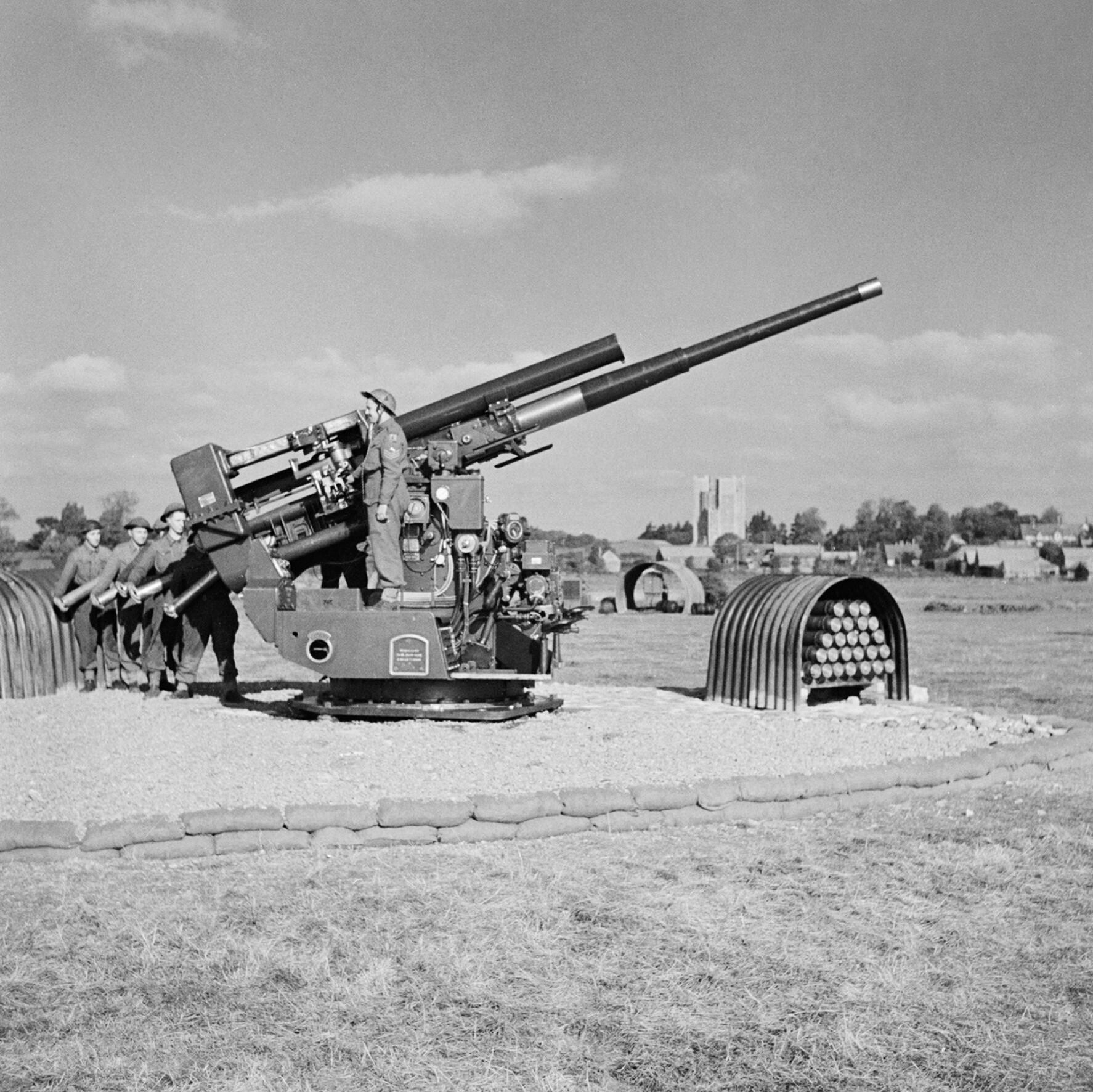
3.7-inch HAA gun on 'anti-Diver' duties, autumn 1944.

In August 1943 the regiment moved to 71st AA Bde. This was part of 2nd AA Group responsible for defending South East England and the approaches to London. Between 21 January and 14 March 1944 the Luftwaffe carried out 11 night raids on London in the so-called 'Baby Blitz'. From April 1944, 2 AA Group had the additional responsibility of defending the ports at which the shipping for the invasion of Europe (Operation Overlord) was being gathered. By now, 136th HAA Rgt formed part of a new 102nd AA Bde in 2 AA Group.

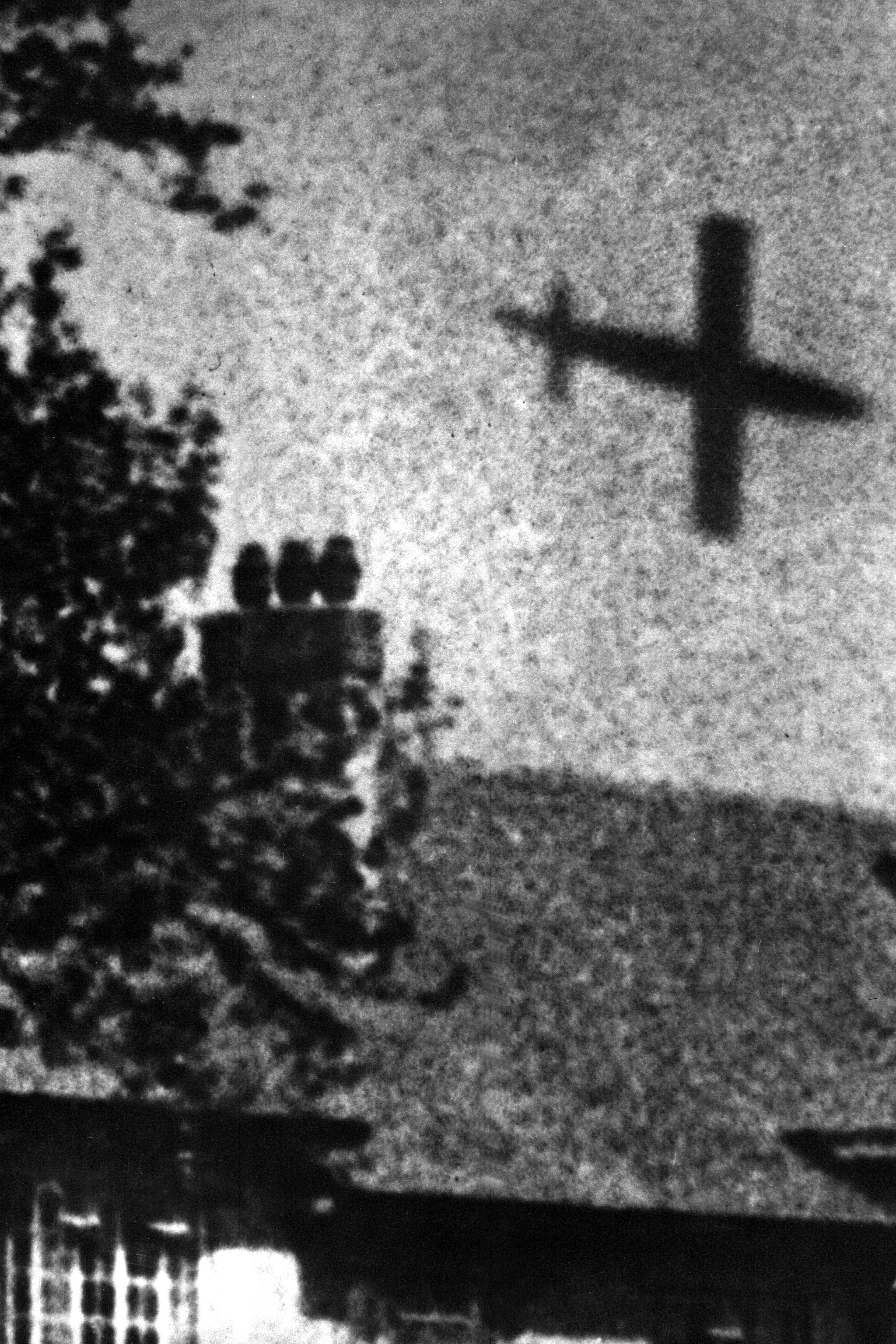
A V-1 falling to earth in London, 1944

No sooner had the Overlord fleet sailed on D-Day than the long-anticipated V-1 flying bomb campaign began against London. Large numbers of HAA guns under 2 AA Group were deployed in depth across the line of flight of the V-1s as part of Operation Diver, but it was not until most of the HAA batteries were moved out to the coast and given the latest Radar No 3 Mark V (the SCR-584 radar set) and No 10 Predictors (the all-electric Bell Labs AAA Computer) that their rate of success against these small fast-moving targets began to improve. Once 21st Army Group had overrun the V-1 launching sites in Northern France, the Luftwaffe switched to air-launching V-1s over the North Sea, and many of the 'anti-Diver' batteries had to be relocated to the East Coast during the autumn and winter of 1944–45.

== Postwar ==
After the war ended, 136th HAA Rgt briefly served in Scotland with 40th AA Bde, which had moved to Kincardine. On 1 April 1946, the war-formed 136th HAA Rgt was disbanded at King's Park, Glasgow, and its personnel were used to resuscitate the Regular 5th HAA Rgt, with the TA 409 Bty placed in suspended animation to reform 8 HAA Bty of that regiment. (The original 5th HAA Rgt had been captured at the Fall of Hong Kong on 25 December 1941, but 8 HAA Bty had been operating independently in India and survived, fighting in the retreat through Burma in 1942; it was placed in suspended animation on 28 February 1945.) The reformed 5th HAA Rgt went on to become 69 HAA Rgt in the postwar Regular Army.

=== 660 Heavy AA Regiment ===
When the TA was reconstituted on 1947, 409th (Suffolk) HAA Bty reformed at Lowestoft as a full regiment, designated 660 HAA Rgt, becoming a 'Mixed' unit (indicating that members of the Women's Royal Army Corps were integrated into the regiment) in 1950. The regiment initially formed part of 66th AA Bde (the old 40th AA Bde), though that was disbanded the following year. When AA Command was disbanded on 10 March 1955, 660 HAA Rgt was initially ordered to amalgamate with 4th Bn Suffolk Regiment, but on 22 April this was changed to complete disbandment.

== Honorary Colonel ==
Colonel The Earl of Stradbroke, KCMG, CB, CVO, CBE, VD, TD, commanded III East Anglian Brigade and 272 Brigade RFA in France, Egypt and Palestine during World War I. He became Honorary Colonel of the 103rd (Suffolk) Bde in 1927 and then of 409th Independent AA Bty from 1932 until its merger with 78th HAA Regiment in 1938.

== Notes ==
- Army Council Instructions Issued During June 1916, London: HM Stationery Office, 1916.
- Army Council Instructions Issued During September 1916, London: HM Stationery Office, 1916.
- Army Council Instructions Issued During November 1916, London: HM Stationery Office, 1916.
- Maj A.F. Becke,History of the Great War: Order of Battle of Divisions, Part 2a: The Territorial Force Mounted Divisions and the 1st-Line Territorial Force Divisions (42–56), London: HM Stationery Office, 1935/Uckfield: Naval & Military Press, 2007, ISBN 1-847347-39-8.
- Maj A.F. Becke,History of the Great War: Order of Battle of Divisions, Part 2b: The 2nd-Line Territorial Force Divisions (57th–69th), with the Home-Service Divisions (71st–73rd) and 74th and 75th Divisions, London: HM Stationery Office, 1937/Uckfield: Naval & Military Press, 2007, ISBN 1-847347-39-8.
- Maj A.F. Becke,History of the Great War: Order of Battle of Divisions, Part 3b: New Army Divisions (30–41) and 63rd (R.N.) Division, London: HM Stationery Office, 1939/Uckfield: Naval & Military Press, 2007, ISBN 1-847347-41-X.
- Ian F.W. Beckett, Riflemen Form: A Study of the Rifle Volunteer Movement 1859–1908, Aldershot: Ogilby Trusts, 1982, ISBN 0 85936 271 X.
- Burke's Peerage, Baronetage and Knightage, 100th Edn, London, 1953.
- John Wm. Burrows, Essex Units in the War 1914–1919, Vol 5, Essex Territorial Infantry Brigade (4th, 5th, 6th and 7th Battalions), Also 8th (Cyclist) Battalion The Essex Regiment, Southend: John H. Burrows & Sons, 1932.
- Gen Sir Martin Farndale, History of the Royal Regiment of Artillery: Western Front 1914–18, Woolwich: Royal Artillery Institution, 1986, ISBN 1-870114-00-0.
- Gen Sir Martin Farndale, History of the Royal Regiment of Artillery: The Years of Defeat: Europe and North Africa, 1939–1941, Woolwich: Royal Artillery Institution, 1988/London: Brasseys, 1996, ISBN 1-85753-080-2.
- Gen Sir Martin Farndale, History of the Royal Regiment of Artillery: The Far East Theatre 1939–1946, London: Brasseys, 2002, ISBN 185753302X.
- J.B.M. Frederick, Lineage Book of British Land Forces 1660–1978, Vol II, Wakefield, Microform Academic, 1984, ISBN 1-85117-009-X.
- Rev R.E. Grice-Hutchinson, 'Diary', in R.Whinyates (ed), Artillery and Trench Mortar Memories: 32nd Division, 32nd Divisional (RA) Trench Mortar Association, 1932/Uckfield: Naval and Military Press, 2004, ISBN 1-843429-77-2.
- Joslen, H. F. (2003) [1960]. Orders of Battle: Second World War, 1939–1945. Uckfield, East Sussex: Naval and Military Press. ISBN 978-1-84342-474-1.
- Norman Litchfield & Ray Westlake, The Volunteer Artillery 1859–1908 (Their Lineage, Uniforms and Badges), Nottingham: Sherwood Press, 1982, ISBN 9780950820507.
- Norman E.H. Litchfield, The Territorial Artillery 1908–1988 (Their Lineage, Uniforms and Badges), Nottingham: Sherwood Press, 1992, ISBN 0-9508205-2-0.
- Capt Wilfred Miles, History of the Great War: Military Operations, France and Belgium 1916, Vol II, 2 July 1916 to the End of the Battles of the Somme, London: Macmillan, 1938/Imperial War Museum & Battery Press, 1992, ISBN 0-89839-169-5.
- Lt-Col J.D. Sainsbury, The Hertfordshire Batteries, Royal Field Artillery: An Illustrated History 1908–1920, Welwyn: Hertfordshire Yeomanry and Artillery Historical Trust/Hart Books, 1996, ISBN 0-948527-04-8.
- Titles and Designations of Formations and Units of the Territorial Army, London: War Office, 7 November 1927.

== External sources ==
- British Army units from 1945 on Archived 29 August 2015 at the Wayback Machine
- British Military History
- The Drill Hall Project
- Great War Centenary Drill Halls
- The Long, Long Trail
- Orders of Battle at Patriot Files Archived 26 March 2023 at the Wayback Machine
- Land Forces of Britain, the Empire and Commonwealth – Regiments.org (archive site)
- Royal Artillery 1939–1945 (archive site)
- Graham Watson, The Territorial Army 1947 Archived 9 December 2021 at the Wayback Machine
