= 136th Heavy Anti-Aircraft Regiment, Royal Artillery =

136th HAA Regiment, RA
- Royal Artillery cap badge
- Active: 28 October 1941 – 1 April 1946
- Country: United Kingdom
- Branch: British Army
- Role: Air defence
- Size: Regiment
- Part of: Anti-Aircraft Command
- Engagements: Baby Blitz; Operation Diver

136th Heavy Anti-Aircraft Regiment was an air defence unit of Britain's Royal Artillery during World War II. It protected the UK against air attack as part of Anti-Aircraft Command, including the defence against V-1 flying bombs (Operation Diver). It was disbanded at the end of the war.

== Organisation ==
136th Heavy Anti-Aircraft Regiment (136th HAA Rgt) was formed during a period of rapid expansion of Anti-Aircraft Command, mainly utilising Territorial Army (TA) batteries drawn from existing regiments. Regimental Headquarters (RHQ) was established on 28 October 1941 at Newtown Linford, Leicestershire, and during November the following batteries were regimented with it:

- 182 HAA Battery, originally formed in 65th (Manchester Regiment) HAA Rgt in 1936, joined from the recently formed 128th HAA Rgt on 4 November
- 198 HAA Battery, originally formed in 67th (York and Lancaster Regiment) HAA Rgt in 1936, joined from the recently formed 122nd HAA Rgt on 4 November
- 409 (Suffolk) HAA Battery, formed in 1932, joined from 78th (1st East Anglian) HAA Rgt on 18 November
- 432 HAA Battery joined on 4 November from 65th (Manchester Regiment) HAA Rgt, which it had recently joined to replace 182 HAA Bty

== Deployment ==
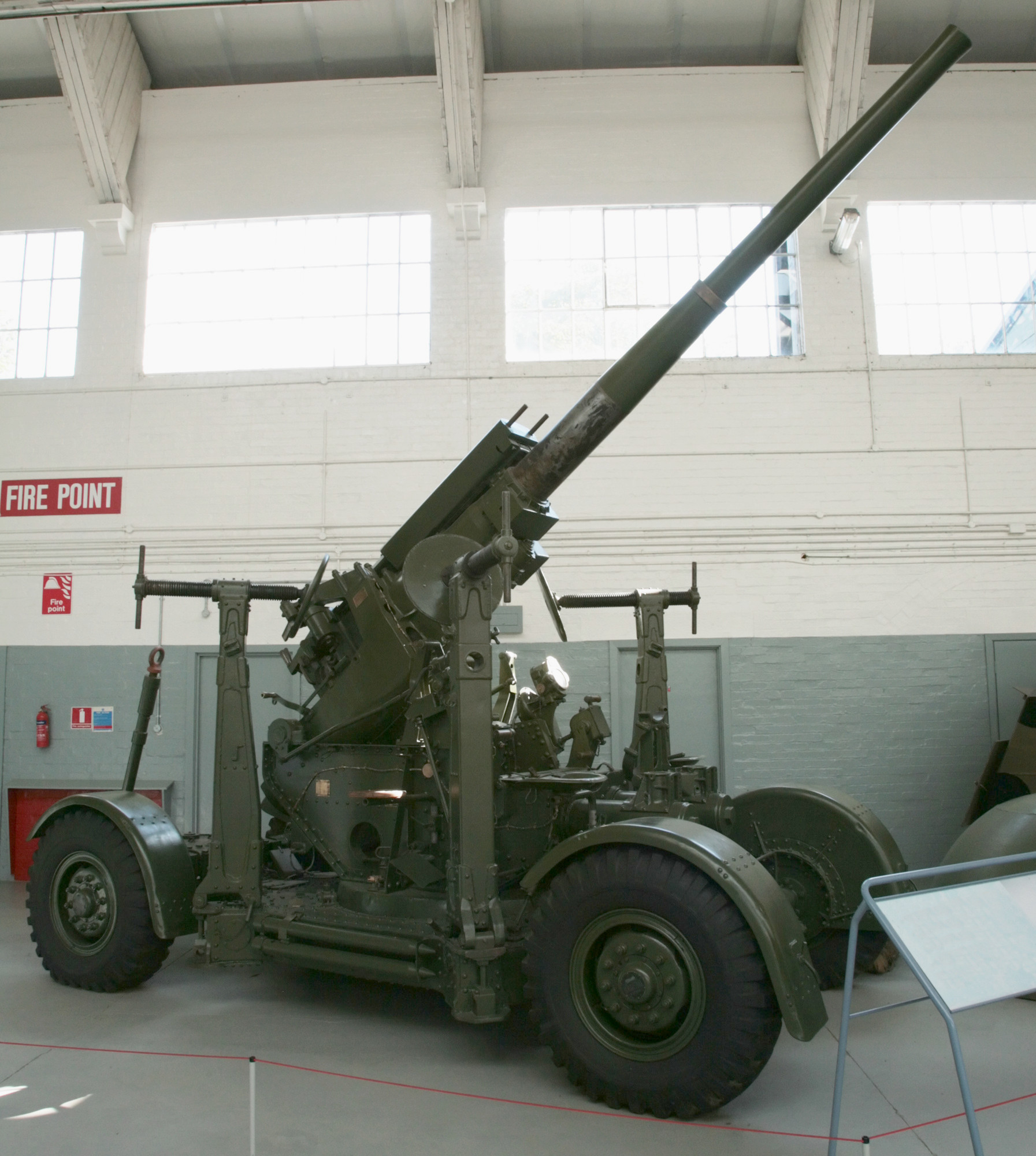
3.7-inch HAA gun preserved at Imperial War Museum Duxford.

The new regiment formed part of 32nd (Midland) Anti-Aircraft Brigade defending the East Midlands of England in 2nd AA Division. On 30 March 1942, a newly-formed 517 (Mixed) HAA Bty joined the regiment from 205th HAA Training Rgt at Arborfield. 'Mixed' indicated that two-thirds of the personnel of the battery were women drawn from the Auxiliary Territorial Service, who had been called upon to ease AA Command's manpower shortage. The battery had been formed on 13 January from a cadre of experienced officers and other ranks provided by 98th HAA Rgt. 136th HAA Regiment provided the cadre for 552 (M) HAA Bty formed on 26 March 1942 at 210th HAA Training Rgt at Oswestry; this later joined 154th (M) HAA Rgt.

At the beginning of April 1942, 136th HAA Rgt moved to 30th (Northumbrian) AA Bde in 7th AA Division covering North East England, but by the end of June it was back in the East Midlands with 32nd AA Bde. The Luftwaffe carried out a number of air raids against the Midlands and NE England in the middle part of 1942, but nothing on the scale of the Blitz in 1940–41.

On 10 July 1942 198 HAA Battery was transferred to help form a new 165th HAA Rgt at Clifton, Bristol and was replaced by 468 HAA Bty from 78th (1st East Anglian) HAA Rgt. Then on 28 August 517 (M) HAA Bty left to form the basis for 172nd (M) HAA Rgt at Nottingham

In early 1943, 409 (Suffolk) HAA Bty was temporarily detached from the regiment and attached to 50th AA Bde covering Derby and Nottingham. In May, the whole of 136th HAA Rgt moved south to join 37th AA Bde along the north side of the Thames Estuary under 1 AA Group.

== Baby Blitz and Operation Overlord ==
In August 1943 the regiment moved to 71st AA Bde. This was part of 2nd AA Group responsible for defending South East England and the approaches to London.

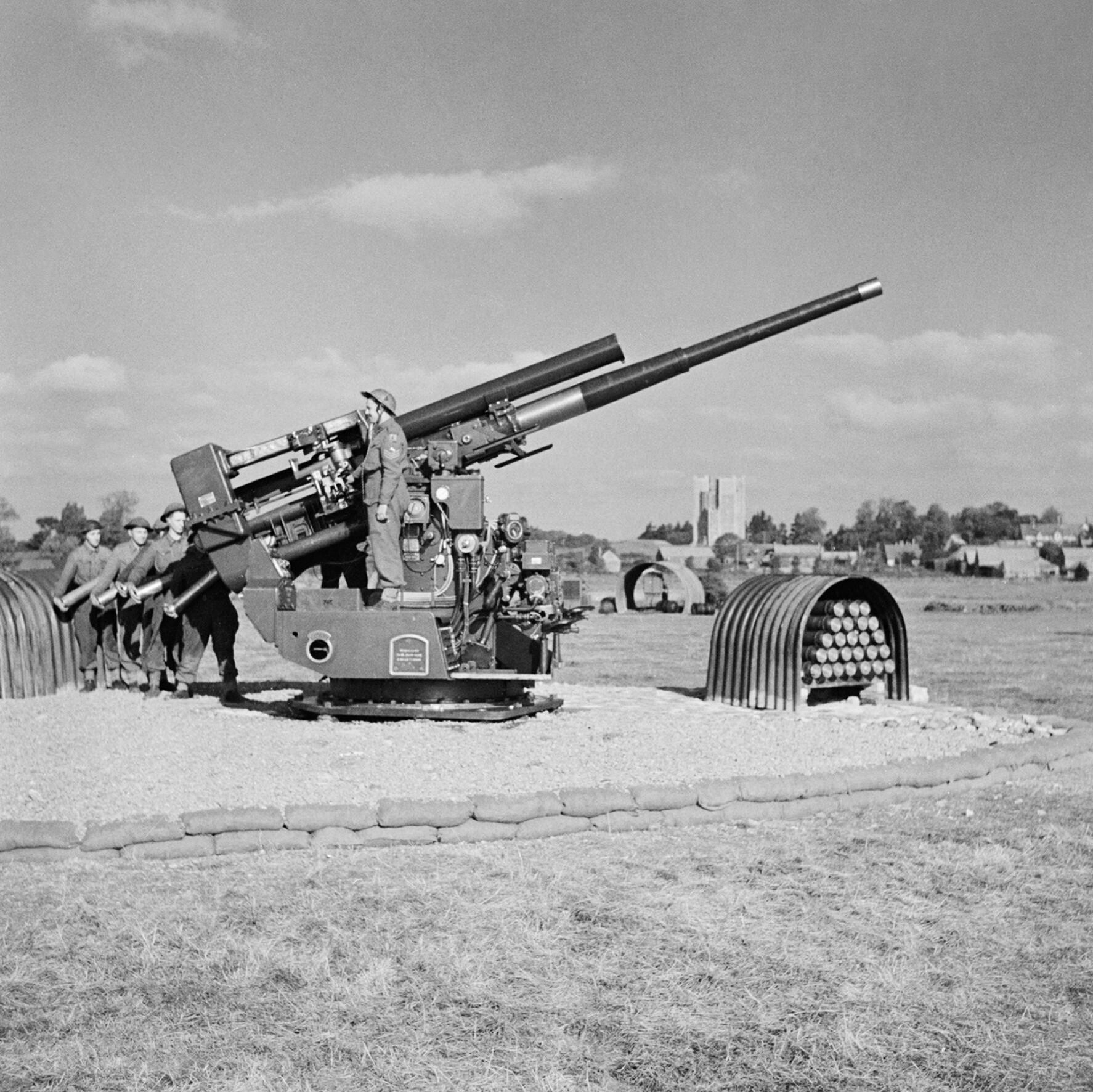
3.7-inch HAA gun on 'anti-Diver' duties, autumn 1944.

Between 21 January and 14 March 1944 the Luftwaffe carried out 11 night raids on London in the so-called 'Baby Blitz'. From April 1944, 2 AA Group had the additional responsibility of defending the ports at which the shipping for the invasion of Europe (Operation Overlord) was being gathered. By now, 136th HAA Rgt formed part of a new 102 AA Bde in 2 AA Group, but in May it transferred to 44 AA Bde, which had been brought down from Manchester take over the AA defences on the Isle of Wight. Here it came under the command of 6 AA Group, which had responsibility for covering the 'Overlord' embarkation ports around the Solent and Portsmouth. On the night of 16 May 182 and 409 HAA Btys submitted claims for 'kills' of Luftwaffe aircraft attempting to lay mines in the Solent.

== Operation Diver ==
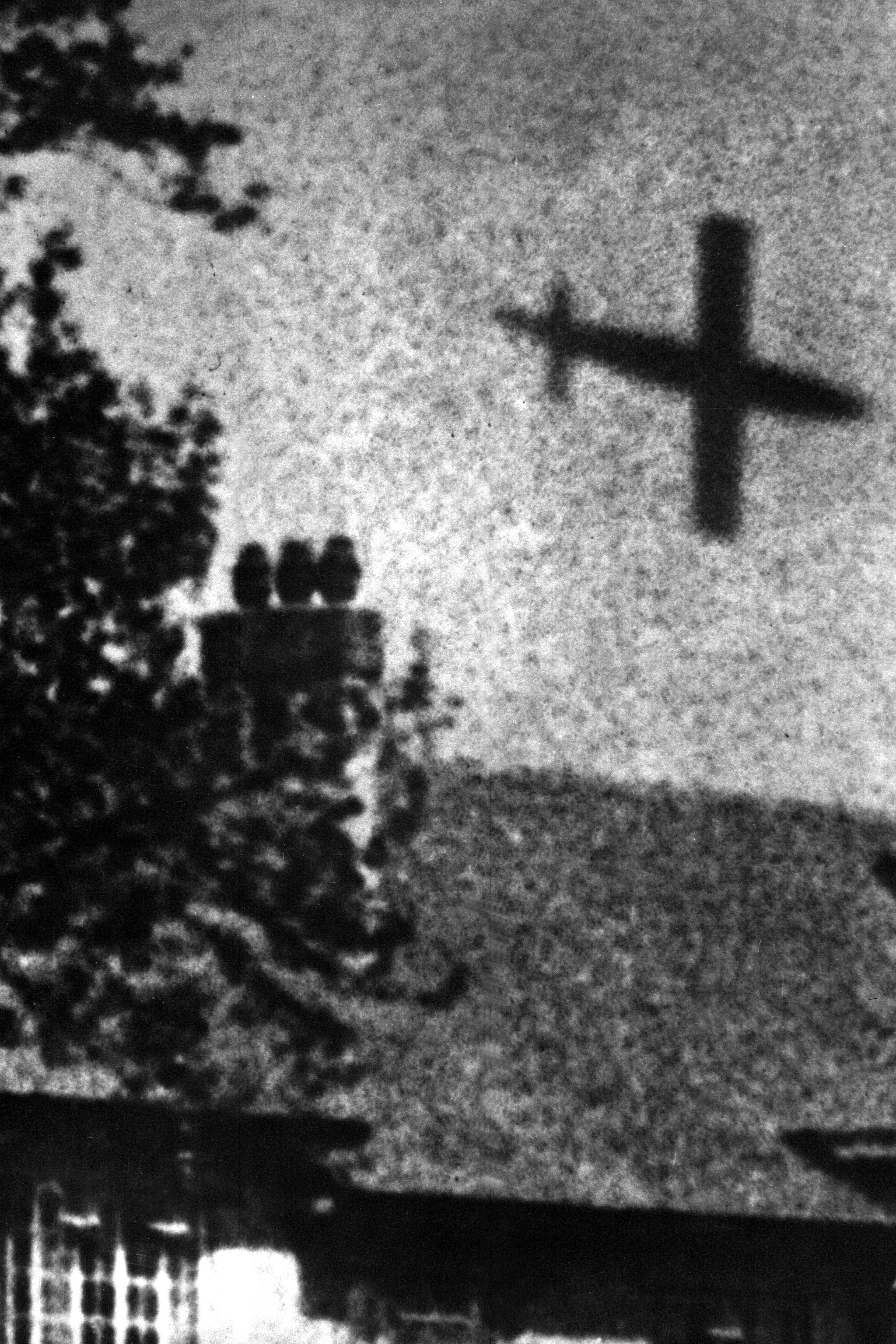
A V-1 falling to earth in London, 1944

No sooner had the 'Overlord' fleet sailed on D-Day than the long-anticipated V-1 flying bomb campaign began against London. Large numbers of HAA guns under 2 AA Group were deployed in depth across the line of flight of the V-1s as part of Operation Diver. 136th HAA Regiment was one of the units immediately sent to reinforce 40 AA Bde in this 'Diver Belt'. However, the results were disappointing, and after a fortnight AA Command changed its tactics. Firstly, mobile HAA guns were replaced with static installations that could traverse more quickly to track the fast-moving targets and were given the latest Radar No 3 Mark V (the SCR-584 radar set) and No 10 Predictors (the all-electric Bell Labs AAA Computer). These were emplaced on temporary 'Pile platforms' named after the Commander-in-Chief of AA Command, Gen Sir Frederick 'Tim' Pile. Secondly, the HAA gun belt was moved to the coast and interlaced with Light AA guns to hit the missiles out to sea. This new belt was divided into six brigade sectors, 5 AA Bde taking charge of one sector under 1 AA Gp with 136th HAA Rgt under command. The whole process involved the movement of hundreds of guns and vehicles and thousands of servicemen and women, but a new 8-gun site could be established in 48 hours. The guns were constantly in action, but the success rate against the 'Divers' steadily improved, until over 50 per cent of incoming missiles were destroyed by gunfire or fighter aircraft. This phase of Operation Diver ended in September after the V-1 launch sites in Northern France had been overrun by 21st Army Group. 136th HAA Regiment moved to the command of 71 AA Bde, still in the Diver Belt, in September.

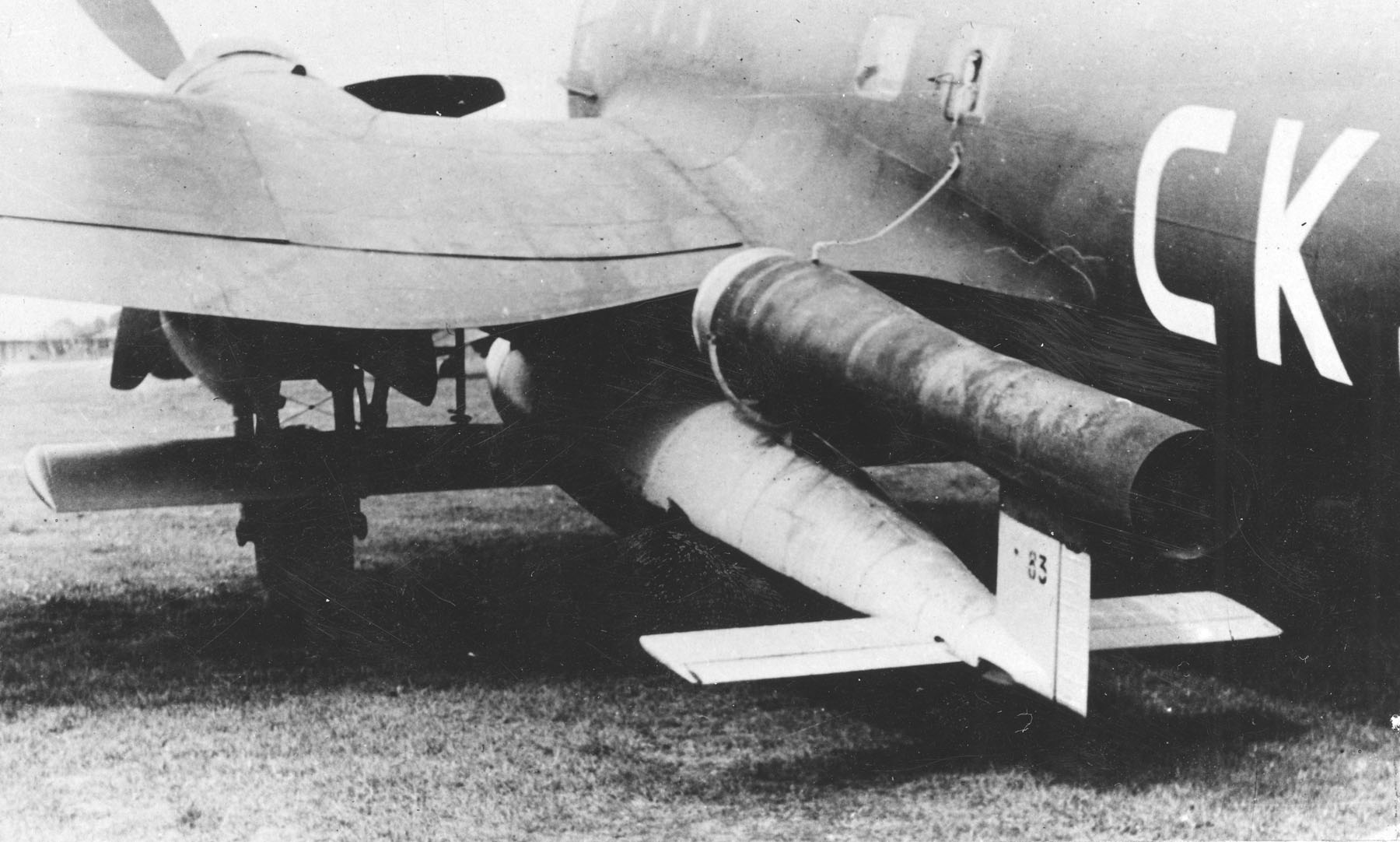
A Heinkel He 111 bomber carrying a V-1 for air-launching.

A new phase of the V-1 offensive began in the second half of September 1944 when the Luftwaffe began launching V-1s from aircraft flying over the North Sea. Once again, AA Command had to redeploy its guns. In October, 136th HAA Rgt rejoined 40 AA Bde, which had been transferred to the 'Diver Box' defences over the outer Thames Estuary. This time the wholesale movement of guns, platforms, personnel and huts fell into chaos as the staff work of the AA groups and brigades fell apart, earning a stinging rebuke from Gen Pile. The responsibilities proved too large for one group HQ, and a new 9 AA Group was formed to take command of the Diver defences on the coast of East Anglia, including 40 AA Bde.

The Luftwaffe abandoned air-launched V-1s in January 1945, but a final burst of longer-range missiles were launched from the Netherlands in March 1945: the success rate of the AA guns against these was 80–100 per cent. Despite the depletion of AA Command to provide manpower for 21st Army Group, 136th HAA Rgt was one of the units that remained operational until the end. On 14 February 1945, 468 HAA Bty transferred to 128th HAA Rgt, which had lost two batteries disbanded. The war in Europe ended on VE Day, and AA Command was rapidly run down thereafter.

== Postwar ==
After the war ended, 136th HAA Rgt briefly served in Scotland with 40 AA Bde, which had moved to Kincardine. On 1 April 1946, the war-formed 136th HAA Rgt was disbanded at King's Park, Glasgow, and its personnel were used to resuscitate the Regular 5th HAA Rgt, with the TA 409 (Suffolk) Bty placed in suspended animation to reform 8 HAA Bty of that regiment. (The original 5th HAA Rgt had been captured at the Fall of Hong Kong on 25 December 1941, but 8 HAA Bty had been operating independently in India and survived, fighting in the retreat through Burma in 1942; it had been placed in suspended animation on 28 February 1945.) The reformed 5th HAA Rgt went on to become 69 HAA Rgt in the postwar Regular Army.

When the TA was reconstituted on 1 January 1947, 409th (Suffolk) HAA Bty reformed at Lowestoft as a full regiment, 660 HAA Rgt.
