= 32nd (Midland) Anti-Aircraft Brigade =

32nd (Midland) Anti-Aircraft Brigade 58 Anti-Aircraft Brigade
- Active: 1 November 1936–31 January 1945; 1 January 1947 – 31 October 1955
- Country: United Kingdom
- Branch: Territorial Army
- Type: Anti-Aircraft Brigade
- Role: Air Defence
- Part of: 2nd AA Division; 5th AA Group
- Garrison/HQ: Derby
- Engagements: The Blitz

The 32nd (Midland) Anti-Aircraft Brigade was an air defence formation of Anti-Aircraft Command in Britain's Territorial Army (TA) from 1936 to 1955, charged with defending the East Midlands of England.

== Origin ==
The formation was raised on 1 November 1936 at Normanton House, Derby, as 32nd (South Midland) Anti-Aircraft Group, forming part of 2nd Anti-Aircraft Division. It comprised anti-aircraft (AA) 'brigades' of the Royal Artillery (RA) and AA battalions of the Royal Engineers (RE), but when the RA redesignated its brigades as regiments in 1938, the group adopted the more usual title of 32nd (Midland) Ant-Aircraft Brigade in November 1938. On first formation the brigade comprised the following units:

- 69th (The Royal Warwickshire Regiment) Anti-Aircraft Brigade RA (TA) – Heavy Anti-Aircraft (HAA) unit formed at Birmingham in 1936 by conversion of the 6th Battalion, Royal Warwickshire Regiment
  - HQ, 190th, 191st, 192nd, 199th Anti-Aircraft Batteries
- 40th (The Sherwood Foresters) Anti-Aircraft Battalion, RE (TA) – Searchlight unit formed at Chesterfield in 1936 by conversion of the 6th Battalion, Sherwood Foresters
  - HQ, 358th, 359th, 360th, 361st Anti-Aircraft Companies
- 42nd (The Robin Hoods, Sherwood Foresters) Anti-Aircraft Battalion, RE (TA) – Searchlight unit formed at Nottingham in 1936 by conversion of 7th (Robin Hood Rifles) Battalion, Sherwood Foresters
  - HQ, 366th, 367th, 368th, 369th Anti-Aircraft Companies
- 44th (The Leicestershire Regiment) Anti-Aircraft Battalion, RE (TA) – Searchlight unit formed at Leicester in 1936 by conversion of the 4th Battalion, Leicestershire Regiment
  - HQ, 374th, 375th, 376th, 377th Anti-Aircraft Companies
- 45th (The Royal Warwickshire Regiment) Anti-Aircraft Battalion, RE (TA) – Searchlight unit formed at Birmingham in 1936 by conversion of the 5th Battalion, Royal Warwickshire Regiment
  - HQ, 378th, 379th, 380th, 381st Anti-Aircraft Companies

All these units had previously been infantry battalions of the former 46th (North Midland) Division, which had been converted into 2 AA Division in 1935.

== Second World War ==
=== Mobilisation ===
With the continued expansion of AA defences, especially after the Munich Crisis of 1938, new formations appeared, culminating in the creation of Anti-Aircraft Command, responsible for all TA air defence units in the UK. As a result of this expansion, some existing units transferred from 32 AA Bde to the new formations, while newly formed units replaced them, although the brigade remained within 2 AA Division. On the outbreak of war its order of battle was as follows:

- 68 AA Regiment RA – HAA unit formed in 1936 by conversion of 62nd Field Brigade, Royal Artillery, also from 46th Division
  - 200 & 220 (Derby) AA Btys at Derby
  - 276 & 277 AA Btys at Nottingham
- 42 (Robin Hoods) AA Battalion RE – see above
- 44 (Leicester) AA Battalion RE – see above
- 50 (Northamptonshire Regiment) AA Battalion RE – formed in 1937 by conversion of 4th Bn Northamptonshire Regiment
  - 400, 401, 402, 403 AA Coys
- 32nd Anti-Aircraft Brigade Company, Royal Army Service Corps

=== Battle of Britain and Blitz ===
In 1940 the RE AA battalions were transferred to the RA, and that summer the AA regiments of the RA were redesignated Heavy Anti-Aircraft (HAA) to distinguish them from the new Light Anti-Aircraft (LAA) units being formed.

==== Order of Battle 1940–41 ====
Formation sign of 2 AA Division, worn 1940–42

During The Blitz of 1940–41, 32 AA Bde controlled the following AA units defending the East Midlands:

- 78 (1st East Anglian) HAA Regiment (part) – formed in 1937 by conversion of 84th (1st East Anglian) Field Brigade, RA; split into detachments during Battle of Britain; concentrated into 40 AA Bde by May 1941
- 113 HAA Regiment (part) – new unit raised November 1940; split into detachments during Blitz; concentrated into new 66 AA Bde by May 1941
  - 359, 362, 366, 391 HAA Btys
- 27 LAA Regiment – raised in Northern Command before September 1939; 'left July 1941 for Eighth Army
  - 107, 113, 149 LAA Btys
- 38 LAA Regiment (part) – raised in Northern Command before September 1939
- 64 LAA Regiment (part) – raised November 1940
- 41st (5th North Staffordshire Regiment) Searchlight Regiment – formed at Stoke-on-Trent in 1936 by conversion of 5th Bn North Staffordshire Regiment from 46 Division
  - 362, 363, 364, 365 S/L Btys
- 44 Searchlight Regiment – see above
  - 374, 375, 376, 377 S/L Btys
- 58 (Middlesex) Searchlight Regiment – formed in 1938 as a duplicate of 36 (Middlesex) Searchlight Regiment
  - 344, 425, 426 S/L Btys
  - 511 S/L Bty – attached to 10 AA Division

=== Mid-War ===
The Blitz ended in May 1941, but occasional raids continued. The brigade's order of battle was now predominantly composed of searchlight (S/L) units. AA Command redeployed its S/L units during the summer of 1941 into 'Indicator Belts' of radar-controlled S/L clusters covering approaches to the RAF's Night-fighter sectors, repeated by similar belts covering AA Command's Gun Defence Areas (GDAs). Inside each belt was a 20-mile deep 'Killer Belt' of single S/Ls cooperating with night-fighters patrolling defined 'boxes'. The pattern was designed to ensure that raids penetrating deeply towards the Midlands GDAs would cross more than one belt, and the GDAs had more S/Ls at close spacing. The number of LAA units to protect Vital Points such as airfields was growing, albeit slowly.

In June 1941, Lieutenant-Colonel T.R. Anderson, MC, who had seen active service on the Western Front and in Mesopotamia during the First World War, and had commanded 2 S/L Rgt during the Battle of France, was promoted to brigadier to command 32 AA Bde. During his command he worked closely with Group Captain Basil Embry commanding RAF Wittering Sector to defend the industrial Midlands, but died on 7 August 1943, which Embry attributed to overwork.

Newly formed units joining AA Command were increasingly 'mixed' ones into which women of the Auxiliary Territorial Service were integrated. At the same time, experienced units were posted away for service overseas. This led to a continual turnover of units, which accelerated in 1942 with the preparations for Operation Torch.

==== Order of Battle 1941–42 ====
During this period the division was composed as follows (temporary detachments omitted):

- 136th HAA Rgt – new regiment formed October 1941
  - 182, 409 (Suffolk), 432 HAA Btys
  - 198 HAA Bty – to new 165 HAA Rgt July 1942
  - 468 HAA Bty – joined from 78th (1st East Anglian) HAA Rgt July 1942
- 64th LAA Rgt – from 66 AA Bde Autumn 1941; to War Office control for Operation Torch August 1942
  - 191, 193, 285 LAA Btys
  - 458 LAA Bty – new battery joined February 1942; to new 138th LAA Rgt July 1942
- 120th LAA Rgt – converted from 86th S/L Rgt; joined September 1942
  - 11, 393, 394, 395 LAA Btys
- 134th LAA Rgt – new regiment joined April 1942; left June 1942
  - 192, 230, 275, 287 LAA Btys
- 41st S/L Rgt
  - 362, 363, 364 S/L Btys
  - 365 S/L Bty – to 83rd S/L Rgt January 1942
- 44th S/L Rgt – to 66 AA Bde December 1941
  - 374, 375, 376, 377 S/L Btys
- 58th S/L Rgt
  - 344, 425, 426 S/L Btys
  - 511 S/L Bty – to 30th (Surrey) S/L Rgt January 1942
- 60th (Middlesex) S/L Rgt – from 41 AA Bde January 1942; left and converted to 126th LAA Rgt March 1942
  - 371, 429, 430, 431 S/L Btys
- 65th (Essex Regiment) S/L Rgt – from 41 AA Bde Autumn 1941
  - 444, 445, 446 S/L Btys
- 32 AA Bde Signal Office Mixed Sub-Section (part of No 2 Company, 2 AA Division Mixed Signal Unit, Royal Corps of Signals)

When the AA Divisions were disbanded in 1942, 32 AA Bde came under the command of 5 AA Group, based in Nottingham, and remained with it until the end of its wartime service.

=== Late war ===
At the end of 1942, 120th LAA Rgt left for mobile training, and in the early part of 1943 41st (5NSR) S/L Rgt moved to the Humber defences and 58th (Middlesex) S/L Rgt left for 41 AA Bde. Although 43rd (5th Duke of Wellington's Regiment) S/L Rgt joined, by March 1943 32 AA Bde had been reduced to one battery of 136th HAA Rgt (the others being distributed to other brigades) and the six S/L batteries of 43 and 65 S/L Rgts. All these units had left by August 1943, after which the brigade was entirely composed of Mixed (M) units, including some armed with Z Battery rocket projectiles that were partly manned by members of the Home Guard.

==== Order of Battle 1943–44 ====
From August 1943 the brigade had the following composition:

- 127th HAA Rgt – from 2 AA Group Autumn 1943; to 40 AA Bde November 1943
  - 396, 411, 422, 433 HAA Btys
- 139th (M) HAA Rgt – to 63 AA Bde February 1944
  - 483, 484, 485, 518 (M) HAA Btys
- 161st (M) HAA Rgt – from 63 AA Bde August 1943
  - 447, 478, 558 (M) HAA Btys
  - 593 (M) HAA Bty – left by April 1944
- 172nd (M) HAA Rgt – to 63 AA Bde August 1943; returned February 1944; to 65 AA Bde May 1944
  - 517, 570, 573 (M) HAA Btys
  - 582 (M) HAA Bty – joined by February, left by March 1944
  - 668 (M) HAA Btys – left by March 1944
- 81st LAA Rgt – from 8 AA Group March, to 2 AA Group April 1944
  - 199, 261, 307 LAA Btys
- 15th (M) 'Z' AA Rgt
  - 120, 180, 181, 219 (M) 'Z' Btys
- 16th (M) 'Z' AA Rgt – joined from 39 AA Bde April 1943
  - 126, 195, 227 (M) 'Z' Btys

'Z' AA Rgts were redesignated AA Area Mixed Rgts in April 1944

==== Order of Battle 1944–45 ====
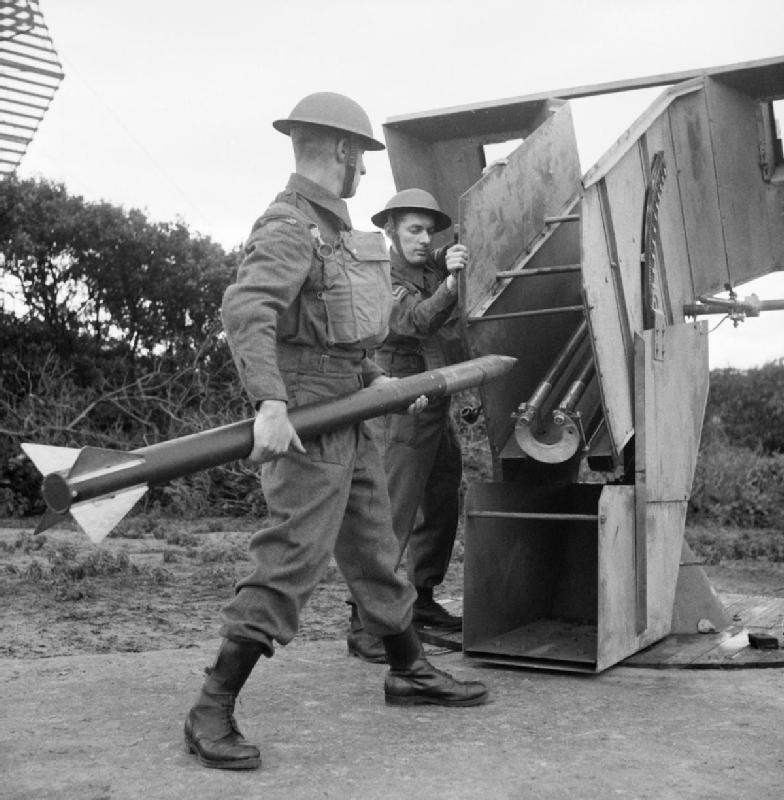
Home Guard soldiers load a single launcher on a static 'Z' Battery, July 1942

The composition of 32 AA Bde remained stable during the summer of 1944. Then in October there was a further reorganisation:

- 161st (M) HAA Rgt
  - 447, 478, 558 (M) HAA Btys
- 182nd (M) HAA Rgt
  - 588, 592, 594 (M) HAA Btys
- 6th AA Area Mixed Rgt
  - 146, 183, 209 (M) 'Z' Btys
- 15th AA Area Mixed Rgt
  - 120, 180, 181, 219 (M) 'Z' Btys
- 16th AA Area Mixed Rgt
  - 126, 195, 227 (M) 'Z' Btys
- 32nd AA Area Mixed Rgt
  - 170, 20, 207, 225 (M) 'Z' Btys

By this time, the brigade's HQ establishment was 8 officers, 7 male other ranks and 22 members of the ATS, together with a small number of attached drivers, cooks and mess orderlies (male and female). In addition, the brigade had a Mixed Signal Office Section of 5 male other ranks and 19 ATS, which was formally part of the Group signal unit.

=== Disbandment ===
During the Summer of 1944 London and South-East England had been bombarded with V-1 flying bombs. Once the launching sites were overrun by 21st Army Group, the Luftwaffe began launching them from aircraft over the North Sea. 5 AA Group had to reorganise its defences, stripping HAA guns from inland sites and moving them to the coast of East Anglia. AA Command was also suffering a personnel shortage, as fit men were posted to make up losses in 21st Army Group fighting in North West Europe.

In November 1944 all the brigade's units left except 15th and 16th AA Area Mixed Rgts, which were joined by 9th (Londonderry) HAA Rgt (24, 25, 26 HAA Btys) returned from service in the Italian Campaign. Then at the end of the year the Home Guard was stood down and all the Z Btys disappeared. By the beginning of 1945 the brigade only had four AA Area Mixed Rgt HQs (2nd, 15th, 16th, 17th) left under its command. It was briefly joined on 1 January by 72nd (Middlesex) S/L Rgt at Hatfield Militia Camp near Doncaster, which consolidated the personnel of 72nd, 80th and 82nd S/L Rgts while they awaited posting elsewhere.

32nd AA Brigade HQ was disbanded on 31 January 1945.

== Postwar ==
The Brigade was reformed in the TA in 1947, still based at Derby, but renumbered as 58 AA Brigade (TA), (Note: The TA AA brigades were now numbered 51 and upwards, rather than 26 and upwards as in the 1930s; the wartime 58th AA Bde had been disbanded in 1945.) with the following composition:

- 262 (North Midlands) HAA Regt at Derby – formerly 68 (North Midland) HAA (see above)
- 526 HAA Regt at Derby – formerly 26 LAA Regiment
- 528 LAA Regt at Nottingham – formerly 28 LAA Regiment
- 575 (6th Battalion, The Sherwood Foresters) S/L Regt at Chesterfield – formerly 149 LAA, and before that 40 S/L (see above)
- 577 (The Robin Hoods, Sherwood Foresters) S/L Regt at Nottingham – formerly 42 S/L (see above)

In 1954, 262 and 526 HAA Regiments amalgamated as 262 Regiment. Then on 10 March 1955, AA Command was disbanded and a number of AA units were disbanded or merged. From 58 AA Bde, 262 HAA Regiment became P (North Midland) Battery of a new 438 LAA Regiment (which also included the former Leicester and Northampton Searchlight Regiments, see above), while 528 and 577 Regiments merged into 350 Regiment in Nottingham. Finally, the brigade was placed in suspended animation on 31 October 1955, and completely disbanded on 31 December 1957.

== Online sources ==
- British Army units from 1945 on
- British Military History
- Orders of Battle at Patriot Files
- Land Forces of Britain, the Empire and Commonwealth (Regiments.org)
- The Royal Artillery 1939–45
