= 1st Norfolk Artillery Volunteers =

British Territorial Army Volunteer Artillery regiment

1st Norfolk Artillery Volunteers 1st East Anglian Brigade, RFA 84th (East Anglian) Field Brigade, RA 78th (1st East Anglian) HAA Regiment, RA
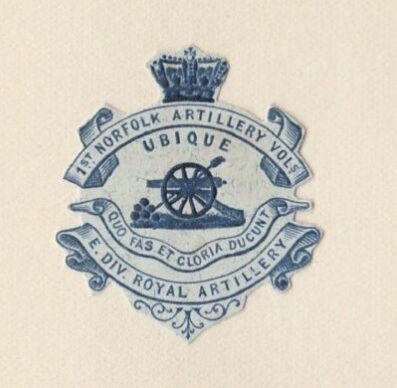
- Letterhead, 1st Norfilk Artillery Volunteers, c1890
- Active: 29 September 1859–10 March 1955
- Country: United Kingdom
- Branch: Volunteer Force/Territorial Army
- Type: Artillery Regiment
- Role: Garrison Artillery; Field Artillery; Anti-Aircraft Artillery
- Garrison/HQ: Great Yarmouth; Norwich
- Engagements: WWI: Western Front; Sinai and Palestine Campaign; WWII: The Blitz; Italian Campaign

Commanders
- Notable commanders: Colonel The Earl of Stradbroke, KCMG, CB, CVO, CBE, VD, TD

The 1st Norfolk Artillery Volunteers was a unit of Britain's Volunteer Force raised in the County of Norfolk in 1859 as a response to a French invasion threat. It became part of the Territorial Force in 1908 and served under various designations as field artillery in Palestine during World War I, and as heavy anti-aircraft artillery in North Africa and Italy during World War II. It disappeared in a merger in 1955.

== Artillery Volunteers 1859–1908 ==
The enthusiasm for the Volunteer movement following an invasion scare in 1859 saw the creation of many Rifle, Artillery and Engineer Volunteer units composed of part-time soldiers eager to supplement the Regular British Army in time of need. The 1st Norfolk Artillery Volunteer Corps (AVC) was formed at Great Yarmouth on 29 September 1859, with further batteries being added on 23 February and 4 June 1860, and 26 December 1862. In January 1864, several AVCs from Essex and Suffolk were attached to the 1st Norfolk for administration, and in November that year the 1st Administrative Brigade, Norfolk Artillery Volunteers, was formed with the following composition:

- 1st Norfolk AVC – two batteries at Great Yarmouth
- 2nd Norfolk AVC – two batteries formed from the Norwich men of the 1st Norfolk AVC 1869
- 1st Essex AVC– formed at Harwich on 18 February 1869
- 1st Suffolk AVC – formed at Lowestoft on 19 July 1860
- 2nd Suffolk AVC– formed at Walton, Suffolk on 15 October 1860; disbanded 1871
- 3rd Suffolk AVC– formed 1864 at Aldeburgh from 21st Suffolk Rifle Volunteer Corps (raised in June 1861).
- 4th Suffolk AVC – formed at Beccles on 14 July 1868

In the early years, the corps used large coastal artillery guns at Great Yarmouth.

When the Volunteers were reorganised in April 1880 the 1st Norfolk Admin Bde was consolidated into a single unit with headquarters at Great Yarmouth. The batteries were distributed as follows:

- 1st and 2nd Batteries – Great Yarmouth, Norfolk
- 3rd and 4th Batteries – Norwich, Norfolk (former 2nd Corps)
- No 5 Battery – Harwich (late 1st Essex Corps)
- No 6 Battery – Lowestoft (late 1st Suffolk Artillery Volunteers)
- No 7 Battery – Aldborough (late 3rd Suffolk Artillery Volunteers)
- No 8 Battery – Beccles (late 4th Suffolk Artillery Volunteers)

However, the Essex volunteers were unhappy with the arrangements and left, so the Suffolk batteries were renumbered as Nos 5, 6 and 7. The unit became the 1st Norfolk (Norfolk & Suffolk) AVC, and was attached to the Eastern Division of the Royal Artillery (RA) in 1882.

As well as manning fixed coast defence artillery, some of the early Artillery Volunteers manned semi-mobile 'position batteries' of smooth-bore field guns pulled by agricultural horses. But the War Office refused to pay for the upkeep of field guns for Volunteers and they had largely died out in the 1870s. In 1888, the 'position artillery' concept was revived and some Volunteer companies were reorganised as position batteries to work alongside the Volunteer infantry brigades. On 14 July 1892, the 1st Norfolk Volunteer Artillery were reorganised as three position batteries and seven garrison companies:

- HQ and No 1 Battery – Great Yarmouth
- Nos 2 and 3 Batteries – Norwich
- No 4 Company – Beccles and Harleston
- Nos 5 and 6 Companies – Lowestoft
- No 7 Company – Aldeburgh and Orford
- No 8 Company – Beccles
- No 9 Company – Southwold
- No 10 Company – Harleston

The Artillery Volunteers were transferred to the Royal Garrison Artillery (RGA) in 1899. When the RA's divisional structure was abolished on 1 January 1902, the unit was redesignated as the 1st Norfolk RGA (Volunteers). An affiliated Cadet Corps was formed at Beccles in 1906.

== Territorial Force ==
In 1908, on the formation of the Territorial Force, the Norfolk batteries of the 1st Norfolk became the I East Anglian Brigade Royal Field Artillery (TF). (The I (1st) Brigade was going to have been numbered II (2nd), but this was changed by October 1908.) At the same time, the Suffolk batteries formed the III East Anglian (Howitzer) Brigade, comprising the 1st and 2nd Suffolk (Howitzer) Batteries and the 3rd East Anglian Ammunition Column.

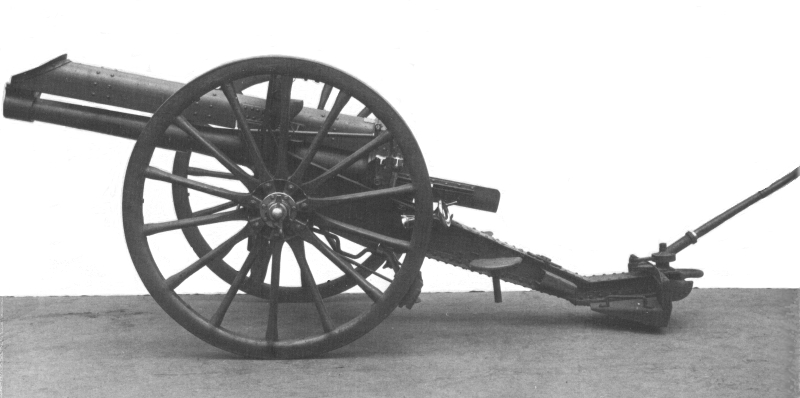
The 15-pounder gun

The new brigade was organised as follows:

- HQ at The Barracks, Surrey Street, Norwich
- 1st Norfolk Battery at Nelson Road, Great Yarmouth
- 2nd Norfolk Battery at Norwich
- 3rd Norfolk Battery at Norwich
- 1st East Anglian Ammunition Column at Norwich

The Commanding Officer (CO) of the 1st Norfolks since 1888 had been Colonel the Earl of Stradbroke, VD; he became Honorary Colonel of the new unit (while remaining CO of the III East Anglian (H) Bde).

The brigade formed part of the East Anglian Division of the TF. By 1914, the batteries were each equipped with four 15-pounder guns.

== World War I ==
=== Mobilisation ===
The East Anglian Division began its annual training on 27 July 1914 and by 3 August the divisional artillery had concentrated at the Redesdale training area in Northumberland. When the order to mobilise was given on 4 August, the units returned to their headquarters and then moved to their war stations. By 10 August, the division had concentrated around Brentwood, Essex. On 20 August, it moved to Chelmsford and formed part of the coast defences of the UK until the following May. Meanwhile, the formation of duplicate or 2nd Line TF units from Home Service men and recruits had been authorised and, towards the end of 1914, the 2nd East Anglian Division came into existence at Peterborough. The original (1st Line) I East Anglian Brigade became the 1/I and its 2nd Line became the 2/I East Anglian Brigade.

=== 1/I East Anglian Brigade ===
The 1st East Anglian Division was employed on coast defence until May 1915, when it was concentrated at St Albans preparatory to going overseas as the 54th (1st East Anglian) Division. However, when the infantry departed for the Gallipoli Campaign, the divisional artillery was left behind. In August it joined the 2nd Line at Thetford and Brandon, Suffolk, rearmed with modern 18-pounder guns and handed over its obsolete 15-pounders to the 2nd Line batteries.

On 17 November 1915, the 54th Divisional Artillery embarked for France, where it joined 33rd Division, a 'Kitchener's Army' division whose artillery were still under training.

After a month on the Western Front, during which parties of officers and men had been attached for training to other divisions in the Front Line, 54th Divisional Artillery was warned that it was to be transferred to Egypt to rejoin its parent division, which had been withdrawn from Gallipoli. Embarkation began at Marseille on 30 January 1916 and disembarkation was completed at Alexandria by 14 February. The divisional artillery rejoined 54th Division at Mena Camp near Cairo and in April moved into No 1 (Southern) Section of the Suez Canal defences.

On 29 May 1916, the 1/I East Anglian Brigade was renumbered CCLXX (270) Brigade RFA and its batteries became A, B and C. It was renumbered again on 21 December, becoming CCLXXII (272) Brigade RFA, and was reorganised into two six-gun batteries, with C Battery split up between A and B.

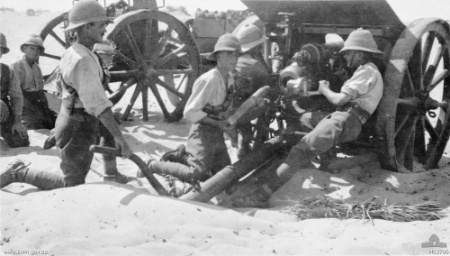
An 18-pounder crew in action in Sinai, 1916.

The infantry battalions of 54th Division were slowly brought back up to strength with drafts from home during 1916 and, by mid-January 1917, the whole division had assembled at Moascar in preparation for the British invasion of Sinai. After crossing the Wilderness, the division took part in the First (26–7 March) and Second Battle of Gaza (17–9 April)

Between 26 June and 1 July 1917, the brigade was reorganised, with A Bty transferred to CCLXIV Bde of 52nd (Lowland) Divisional Artillery and C (Howitzer) Bty (originally the 1st Suffolk Battery, see above) joining from CCLXXI (1/II East Anglian) Bde. Henceforward, the brigade comprised six 18-pounders in B Bty and four 4.5-inch howitzers in C Bty.

The campaign was renewed in the autumn at the Third Battle of Gaza (27 October – 7 November) and the final capture of Gaza (1–7 November). At the end of the year the division was engaged in the Battle of Jaffa (21–22 December).

54th Division was next engaged in the action at Berukin (9–10 April 1918). Finally it took part in the opening stage of Allenby's final offensive (the Battle of Megiddo), known as the Battle of Sharon (19–23 September).

The division was then taken out of the line and concentrated at Haifa, where it was engaged in repairing communications for the rapidly advancing army. It next moved to Beirut, where it was concentrating when the Armistice of Mudros was signed with Turkey and hostilities ended on 31 October.

In late November 1918, the division was ordered to return to Egypt, the artillery proceeding by sea and arriving in mid-December. Demobilisation began in January 1919, and the TF units were slowly reduced to cadres. In March and April, when its guns had been handed in and about one-third of its men had left, 54th Divisional Artillery was converted into an ad hoc cavalry regiment to act as mounted police during disturbances in Cairo. Demobilisation recommenced in May and was completed in June.

=== 2/I East Anglian Brigade ===
Training for the 2nd Line artillery was hindered by the shortage of equipment, and several months passed before guns, horses and harness were received. Even then, only obsolete French De Bange 90 mm cannon were available for training. Early in 1915, the 2nd East Anglian Division (which was numbered 69th in August 1915) concentrated round Thetford, where it formed part of First Army in Central Force. The divisional artillery was distributed around Brandon, Cambridge and Tuddenham. In November, the divisional artillery took over the 15-pounder guns released by its 1st Line (see above).

The division's role throughout the war was to train drafts of reinforcements for units serving overseas. In May 1916, the 2/I East Anglian Brigade was numbered CCCXLV (345) Bde, the batteries became A, B and C, and it was joined by 2/1st Suffolk (Howitzer) Bty from 2/III East Anglian Brigade, which became D (H) Bty. The following month the division was transferred to Northern Command and moved to Harrogate in North Yorkshire.

On 1 September 1916, C Bty changed places (and designations) with 533 (Howitzer) Battery, RFA, at Cowshott (near Aldershot). In November 1916, B Bty was broken up to bring A and C Btys up to six-gun strength. However, the following month the whole brigade was broken up, with A and D (H) Btys becoming B and D (H) Btys in CCCXLVIII (2/IV East Anglian) Bde and C Bty becoming B Bty in CCCXLVI (2/II East Anglian) Bde.

=== 3/I East Anglian Brigade ===
A 3rd Line Depot brigade (3/I East Anglian Brigade) was formed early in March 1915. At first, training had to be carried out without any guns, harness or horses. In May, the unit was affiliated to No 4 TF Artillery School at High Wycombe, which took over training while the 3/Ist became a holding and draft-finding unit. The 3rd Line East Anglian brigades were merged into the school in August 1916, when it became 4th Reserve Brigade, RFA (TF).

== Interwar years ==
=== 84th (1st East Anglian) Field Brigade ===
When the TF was reformed on 7 February 1920, the unit was reformed in 54th (East Anglian) Division as 1st East Anglian Brigade, RFA. On the reconstitution of the TF as the Territorial Army in 1921, it was numbered as 84th (East Anglian) Brigade, RFA,, with the following organisation:

- RHQ at The Barracks, Surrey Street, Norwich
- 333rd (Norfolk) Field Bty at Norwich
- 334th (Norfolk) Field Bty at Norwich
- 335th (Norfolk) Field Bty at Nelson Road, Great Yarmouth
- 336th (Northamptonshire) Field Bty (Howitzer) at 36 Queen's Road, Peterborough – from the pre-war IV East Anglian (Howitzer) Bde

When the RFA merged into the Royal Artillery on 1 June 1924, the unit changed its title to a 'Field Brigade, RA', and the subtitle '1st East Anglian' was restored in 1937. The brigade moved into new drill halls at All Saints Green, Norwich, Artillery Square, Great Yarmouth, and Lincoln Road, Peterborough.

=== 78th (1st East Anglian) Anti-Aircraft Regiment ===
In 1938, the unit was one of a number of field artillery units selected for conversion to the Anti-Aircraft (AA) role as 78th (1st East Anglian) Anti-Aircraft Regiment, RA (still termed a brigade until 1 January 1939). The process began in November 1938, when 336th (Northamptonshire) Bty joined 135th (East Anglian) (Hertfordshire Yeomanry) Field Regiment, and was replaced by 409th (Suffolk) Independent AA Bty at Lowestoft. (The latter had originally been the 1st Suffolk AVC in the 1st Norfolk Administrative Bn, and later C (H) Bty of CCLXXII Bde, see above.) The new regiment therefore had the following composition:

- RHQ at All Saints Green, Norwich
- 243rd (2nd Norfolk) AA Bty at Norwich
- 244th (3rd Norfolk) AA Bty at Norwich
- 245th (1st Norfolk) AA Bty at Artillery Square, Great Yarmouth
- 409th (Suffolk) AA Bty at Lowestoft

The regiment was assigned to 41st (London) Anti-Aircraft Brigade in 2nd AA Division.

== World War II ==
=== Mobilisation ===
In February 1939, the TA's AA defences came under the control of a new Anti-Aircraft Command. In June, as the international situation worsened, a partial mobilisation of the TA was begun in a process known as 'couverture', whereby each AA unit did a month's tour of duty in rotation to man selected AA gun positions. On 24 August, ahead of the declaration of war, AA Command was fully mobilised at its war stations, which in the case of 41st (London) AA Bde was in East Anglia.

=== Phoney War ===
On the evening of Saturday 23 March 1940, a Royal Air Force bomber crashed in flames. Among the first on the scene were Sergeant H. Aspland and Gunners L. Thomas and H. Greenacre of 78th AA Rgt. In spite of the danger of explosion, Sgt Aspland and Gnr Thomas got one member of the crew out from under the wing just before the fuel tank exploded, while Gnr Greenacre carried the unconscious rear gunner to safety. The three men received a commendation from the General Officer Commanding-in-Chief of AA Command.

=== Battle of Britain and Blitz ===
On 1 June 1940, the AA regiments equipped with 3-inch or newer 3.7-inch guns were redesignated 'Heavy AA' (HAA) regiments. During the Battle of Britain and Blitz, from July 1940 to February 1941, 2nd AA Division split 78th HAA Rgt up into detachments between 32nd (Midland), 40th and 41st (London) AA Bdes, covering airfields in East Anglia and the East Midlands, and 39th AA Bde covering the Humber Gun Zone. By May 1941 the regiment was concentrated in 40 AA Bde.

The regiment sent a cadre to 205th HAA Training Rgt, Arborfield, to provide the basis for a new 468 Bty; this was formed on 7 August 1941 and joined the regiment on 6 October 1941 to replace 409 Bty, which was transferred to 136th HAA Rgt. By the end of the year, the regiment was in 41st AA Bde.

The regiment later supplied cadres for 506 and 540 (Mixed) HAA Btys formed on 13 January and 5 March 1942 respectively at 206th HAA Training Rgt, Arborfield, which joined 149th and 158th (Mixed) HAA Rgts ('Mixed' units were those into which women from the Auxiliary Territorial Service were integrated).

During April 1942, the regiment left AA Command (except 468 HAA Bty which joined 136 HAA Rgt, reducing 78th to the three-battery establishment for overseas service) and came under control of the War Office to prepare for overseas service.

=== Middle East ===
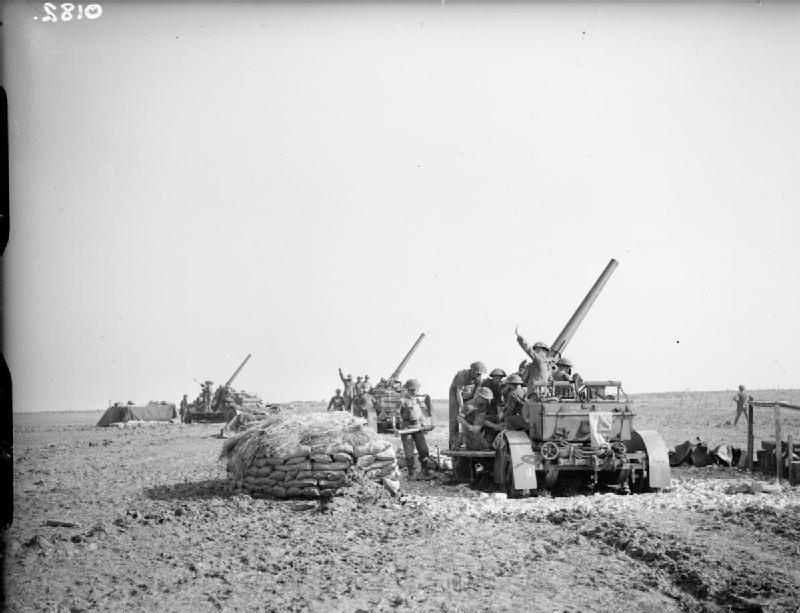
3-inch AA guns on cruciform travelling carriages.

78th HAA Regiment left the UK in June 1942 with 243, 244 and 245 HAA Btys and sailed for the Middle East. The commander of Persia and Iraq Command (PAIFORCE), Gen Henry Maitland Wilson, had urgently requested additional AA units, to cover the vital oilfields and other facilities in case of Luftwaffe attack from the Caucasus, and the regiment joined Ninth Army in October. In the event, the Germans did not break through in the Caucasus and the Luftwaffe was never able to bomb Iraq or Persia, which made the job of AA units in PAIFORCE rather dull.

By January 1943, 78th HAA Rgt was part of 'AA Defence Area Levant' in 20th AA Bde, which covered Haifa, Beirut and Tripoli. The regiment's three batteries between then deployed 20 x 3.7-inch and 4 x 3-inch HAA guns. In November 1943, the regiment moved to Egypt as part of Middle East Forces.

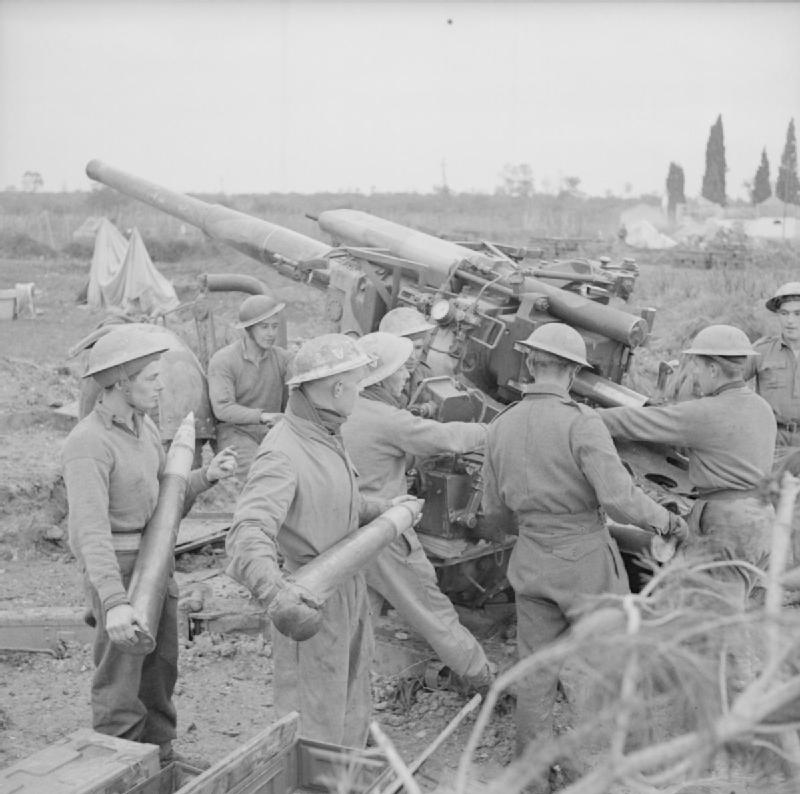
3.7-inch AA gun in action in Italy.

=== Italy ===
From January 1944, the regiment was in Italy. Here, it came under the command of 8th AA Bde, which was defending airfields in the Brindisi area for Eighth Army. In July the brigade was relieved and moved across Italy to defend Civitavecchia and US airfields on the Tiber plain, then back across to Ancona.

However, by this stage of the Italian Campaign, the Luftwaffe was incapable of serious attacks, while the British ground forces were suffering a severe manpower shortage, so many AA units were deemed surplus to requirements and the personnel made available for drafting to other units. 78th HAA Regiment was withdrawn for disbandment in September, and was placed in suspended animation with 243, 244 and 245 HAA Btys on 26 December 1945.

== Postwar ==
When the TA was reconstituted on 1 January 1947, the unit reformed at Great Yarmouth as 284th (1st East Anglian) (Mixed) HAA Rgt, the 'Mixed' now indicating that members of the Women's Royal Army Corps were integrated into the regiment. (The regiment's previous number was taken when the regular 1st Searchlight Rgt reformed as 78th HAA Rgt.)

Meanwhile, 409th (Suffolk) HAA Bty reformed as 660 HAA Rgt at Lowestoft, became Mixed in 1950 and was disbanded in 1955.

Both regiments initially formed part of 66th AA Bde (the old 40th AA Bde), though that was disbanded the following year.

On 1 August 1950, the 284th HAA Rgt absorbed the 418th (Norfolk) (M) HAA Rgt (previously 514th (Suffolk) Coast Rgt, originally the Suffolk RGA). AA Command was disbanded on 10 March 1955, resulting in a large number of disbandments and mergers among TA AA units. The 284th HAA Rgt was merged with the 389th (Norfolk Yeomanry) LAA Rgt to form 284th (The King's Royal Regiment, Norfolk Yeomanry) LAA Rgt, of which the old 284th formed RHQ and Q Btys, with HQ returning to Norwich. This regiment in turn was later merged with 358th (Suffolk Yeomanry) Field Rgt, becoming 308th (Suffolk and Norfolk Yeomanry) Field Rgt, with the HQ moving to Ipswich and ending the Norfolk Artillery Volunteers lineage.

== Honorary Colonel ==
- Lieutenant-Colonel Sir Edmund Henry Knowles Lacon, 3rd Bt, MP, (1807–88) was appointed Hon Col of the 1st Norfolk Artillery Volunteers on 31 December 1881, having been Lt-Col Commandant since 2 December 1864.
- Colonel The Earl of Stradbroke, KCMG, CB, CVO, CBE, VD, TD, (1862–1947)was appointed Honorary Colonel of the I East Anglian Brigade on 1 April 1908, and retained that position with its successor units. He commanded III East Anglian Brigade during World War I and also became Hon Col of the 409th Independent AA Bty from 1932 until its merger with the 78th HAA Regiment in 1938. He died in 1947.
