= 2nd Anti-Aircraft Division (United Kingdom) =

- Formation sign of 2nd Anti-Aircraft Division.
- Active: 15 December 1935 – 1 October 1942
- Country: United Kingdom
- Branch: Territorial Army
- Type: Anti-Aircraft Division
- Role: Air Defence
- Part of: Northern Command (1936–39); Anti-Aircraft Command (1939–40); 2 AA Corps (1940–42)
- Garrison/HQ: Normanton, Derby (1936); RAF Hucknall (1939); Kimberley, Nottinghamshire (1940); Milton Hall, near Peterborough (1941)
- Motto: We sweep the skies.
- Engagements: The Blitz

The 2nd Anti-Aircraft Division (2nd AA Division) was an Air Defence formation of the British Army from 1935 to 1942. It controlled anti-aircraft gun and searchlight units of the Territorial Army (TA) defending the East Midlands and East Anglia during The Blitz.

== Origin ==
In December 1935, the TA's 46th (North Midland) Division (which also acted as HQ for the North Midland Area of Northern Command) was disbanded and its headquarters was converted into 2nd Anti-Aircraft (AA) Division to control the increasing number of AA units being created. At first, it administered all AA units in Great Britain outside London and the Home Counties, which were covered by 1st Anti-Aircraft Division. The new division was first organised at York, but shortly afterwards took over 46 Division's HQ at Normanton, Derby.

== Order of battle ==
By the end of 1936, the division had the following order of battle, though many of the units were in an early stage of formation or conversion:

General Officer Commanding: Major-General James Harrison

- 30th (Northumbrian) Anti-Aircraft Group organised 1 November 1936 in Sunderland
  - 62nd (North and East Riding) Anti-Aircraft Brigade, Royal Artillery (RA) – AA guns
  - 63rd (Northumbrian) Anti-Aircraft Brigade, RA – AA guns
  - 64th (Northumbrian) Anti-Aircraft Brigade, RA – AA guns
  - 37th (Tyne) Anti-Aircraft Battalion (Tyne Electrical Engineers), Royal Engineers (RE) – searchlights
  - 47th (The Durham Light Infantry) Anti-Aircraft Battalion, RE – searchlights
- 31st (North Midland) Anti-Aircraft Group organised 1 November 1936 in Retford
  - 66th (Leeds Rifles) (The West Yorkshire Regiment) Anti-Aircraft Brigade RA (TA) – AA guns
  - 67th (The York and Lancaster Regiment) Anti-Aircraft Brigade RA (TA) – AA guns
  - 43rd (The Duke of Wellington's Regiment) Anti-Aircraft Battalion, RE (TA) – searchlights
  - 46th (The Lincolnshire Regiment) Anti-Aircraft Battalion, RE (TA) – searchlights
- 32nd (South Midland) Anti-Aircraft Group organised 1 November 1936 at Normanton
  - 69th (The Royal Warwickshire Regiment) Anti-Aircraft Brigade RA (TA) – AA guns
  - 40th (The Sherwood Foresters) Anti-Aircraft Battalion, RE (TA) – searchlights
  - 42nd (The Robin Hoods, Sherwood Foresters) Anti-Aircraft Battalion, RE (TA) – searchlights
  - 44th (The Leicestershire Regiment) Anti-Aircraft Battalion, RE (TA) – searchlights
  - 45th (The Royal Warwickshire Regiment) Anti-Aircraft Battalion, RE (TA) – searchlights
- 33rd (Western) Anti-Aircraft Group organised at Chester
  - 65th (The Manchester Regiment) Anti-Aircraft Brigade RA (TA) – AA guns
  - 38th (The King's Regiment) Anti-Aircraft Battalion, RE (TA) – searchlights
  - 39th (The Lancashire Fusiliers) Anti-Aircraft Battalion, RE (TA) – searchlights
  - 41st (5th North Staffordshire Regiment) Anti-Aircraft Battalion, RE (TA) – searchlights

The 40th, 41st, 42nd, 44th and 46th AA battalions had previously been TA infantry battalions in 46th Division.

In 1938, the Royal Artillery replaced the traditional unit designation 'Brigade' by 'Regiment', which allowed the AA Groups to take the more usual formation title of Brigades.

== Mobilisation ==
The TA's AA units were mobilised on 23 September 1938 during the Munich Crisis. Because the organisation of the 2nd AA Division and its component units was not yet complete, it was only partially mobilised. The emergency mobilisation lasted nearly three weeks before the TA units were released on 14 October. The experience led to improvements in equipment scales, and a rapid expansion of AA defences brought many new AA gun and searchlight units into existence. In November 1938, the 32nd and 33rd AA Brigades transferred to the newly formed 4th Anti-Aircraft Division. In June 1939, the 30th and 31st AA Brigades joined the 7th Anti-Aircraft Division. They were replaced in the 2nd AA Division by new brigades created in September 1938: the 39th at Retford in Nottinghamshire and the 40th and 41st in London. The 39th AA Brigade was also intended to transfer to the 7th AA Division just before the outbreak of war, but in practice this did not occur. In April 1939, AA Command was formed to control all the AA gun and searchlight defences of the United Kingdom.

Major-General Harrison was transferred to command RA Training Establishments and was replaced as the General officer commanding (GOC) of the 2nd AA Division on 30 May 1939 by Maj-Gen Claude Grove-White.

The deterioration in international relations during 1939 led to a partial mobilisation in June, and a proportion of TA AA units manned their war stations under a rotation system known as 'Couverture'. Full mobilisation of AA Command came in August 1939, ahead of the declaration of war on 3 September 1939.

== Second World War ==
=== Order of Battle 1939–40 ===
On the outbreak of war, the 2nd AA Division had the following order of battle:

- GOC: Major-General M.F. Grove-White
- HQ: RAF Hucknall
- 32nd (South Midland) Anti-Aircraft Brigade at Derby
  - 68th (North Midland) AA Regt RA
  - 42nd (Robin Hoods, Sherwood Foresters) AA Battalion RE (as above)
  - 44th (Leicestershire Regiment) AA Battalion RE (as above)
  - 50th (Northamptonshire Regiment) AA Bn RE
  - 32nd AA Brigade Company, Royal Army Service Corps (RASC)
- 40th Anti-Aircraft Brigade organised 29 September 1938 at South Ealing, London'
  - 33rd (St Pancras) AA Bn RE
  - 36th (Middlesex) AA Bn RE
  - 58th (Middlesex) AA Bn RE
  - 9th Battalion Middlesex Regiment (60th Searchlight Regiment)
  - 10th (3rd City of London) Battalion. Royal Fusiliers (69th Searchlight Regiment)
  - 40th AA Brigade Company, RASC
- 41st (London) Anti-Aircraft Brigade organised 29 September 1938 in Chelsea, London
  - 78th (1st East Anglian) AA Regt RA
  - 32nd (7th City of London) AA Bn RE
  - 1/6th Battalion Essex Regiment (64th Searchlight Regiment)
  - 2/6th Battalion Essex Regiment (65th Searchlight Regiment)
  - 41st AA Brigade Company, RASC
- 50th Light Anti-Aircraft Brigade organised 24 August 1939 at Hucknall
  - 26th Light Anti-Aircraft Regiment – mobile reserve
- 2nd AA Divisional Signals, Royal Corps of Signals (RCS), at Hucknall
- 2nd AA Divisional Royal Army Service Corps (RASC) at Carter's Green, West Bromwich
  - 904th, 929th Companies
  - 932nd Company (joined July 1941)
- 2nd AA Divisional Company, Royal Army Medical Corps (RAMC), at Hucknall
- 2nd AA Divisional Workshop Company, Royal Army Ordnance Corps (RAOC), at Hucknall

In addition, the 39th AA Brigade remained with the 2nd AA Division with the following composition:

39th Anti-Aircraft Brigade at RAF Digby

- 62nd (Northumbrian) AA Regt
- 67th (York and Lancaster Regiment) AA Regt
- 91st AA Regt
- 40th (Sherwood Foresters) AA Bn
- 46th (Lincolnshire Regiment) AA Bn
- 39th AA Brigade Company, RASC

=== Phoney War ===
When these units went to their war stations, the division had 97 heavy AA (HAA) guns (3-inch and 3.7-inch)ready for action, distributed as follows:

- Hull: 28 (plus 2 out of action)
- Leeds: 24 (plus 6 out of action)
- Sheffield: 20 (plus 3 out of action)
- Derby: 6
- Nottingham: 6 (plus 2 out of action)

The division also had six 3-inch and twelve 40mm Bofors light AA (LAA) guns, as well as 88 light machine guns (LMGs).

On 23 September 1939, responsibility for the Humber Gun Zone (including 30 HAA guns manned by the 62nd (Northumbrian) and 91st AA Rgts) was transferred from the 39th AA Brigade to the 31st AA Brigade in the 7th AA Division. This responsibility reverted to the 39th AA Brigade and the 2nd AA Division in May 1940.

=== Battle of Britain ===
By 11 July 1940, at the start of the Battle of Britain, the division's strength had risen to 231 guns of all types (HAA and LAA excluding LMGs):

- Leighton Buzzard: 4
- Nottingham: 16
- Derby: 40
- Humber: 38
- Mobile battery: 8
- Airfields: 20 (mainly LAA)
- Vital points: 82 (mainly LAA)

In August 1940, all RE AA battalions became Searchlight regiments of the RA, and AA regiments became HAA regiments to distinguish them from the new LAA regiments being formed.

In July 1940, at the height of invasion fears, a mobile column called 'Macduff' was formed by the 50th AA Brigade, consisting of one HAA battery and one S/L Company to operate directly under the command of the 2nd AA Division, available to combat enemy paratroopers.

=== The Blitz ===
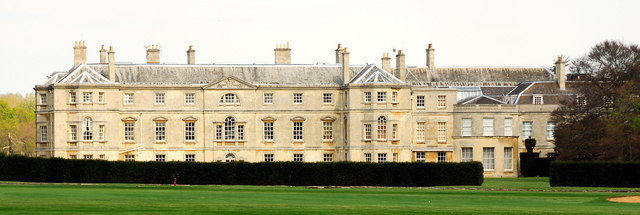
Milton Hall, HQ of the 2nd AA Division in 1941

By late 1940, the 2nd AA Division formed part of II AA Corps. Grove-White had been promoted on 11 November to command the new corps and at first it shared the 2nd AA Division's HQ at RAF Hucknall. The 2nd AA Division then moved to Kimberley, Nottinghamshire, and then on 27 January 1941 to Milton Hall, near Peterborough. The brigades were the same, but by February 1941 their locations and composition had changed:

- GOC: Major-General F.L.M. Crossman, DSO, MC (transferred from 1 AA Division)
- 32nd AA Brigade covering the East Midlands
  - 78th HAA Rgt (part)
  - 113th HAA Rgt (part) formed November 1940
  - 27th LAA Rgt
  - 38th LAA Rgt (part)
  - 64th LAA Rgt (part)
  - 41st S/L Rgt
  - 44th S/L Rgt
  - 58th S/L Rgt
- 40th AA Brigade covering airfields
  - 78th HAA Rgt (part)
  - 30th LAA Rgt
  - 36th S/L Rgt
  - 64th S/L Rgt
  - 72nd (Middlesex) S/L Rgt
- 41st AA Brigade covering East Anglia
  - 78th HAA Rgt (part)
  - 29th LAA Rgt
  - 60th S/L Rgt
  - 65th S/L Rgt
  - 69th S/L Rgt
  - 121st AA Z Battery formed by May 1941, equipped with Z Battery rocket projectiles
- 50th AA Brigade covering Derby & Nottingham
  - 67th HAA Rgt
  - 113th HAA Rgt (part)
  - 28th LAA Rgt
  - 38th LAA Rgt (part)
  - 64th LAA Rgt (part)
  - 42nd S/L Rgt
  - 38th S/L Rgt (part)
  - 50th S/L Rgt
- 2nd AA Divisional Signals

In the spring of 1941, the 50th LAA Brigade was split up, keeping the S/L regiments while a new 66th AA Brigade took the HAA guns and rockets:

- 50th AA Brigade
  - 28th LAA Rgt
  - 4nd2 S/L Rgt
  - 50th S/L Rgt
- 66th AA Brigade
  - 67th HAA Rgt
  - 113th HAA Rgt
  - 38th LAA Rgt
  - 64th LAA Rgt
  - 15th AA 'Z' Rgt

=== Mid-war ===
The division's order of battle thus contained a large number of S/L units. AA Command redeployed its S/L units during the summer of 1941 into 'Indicator Belts' of radar-controlled S/L clusters covering approaches to the RAF's Night-fighter sectors, repeated by similar belts covering AA Command's Gun Defence Areas (GDAs). Inside each belt was a 20 miles (32 km) deep 'Killer Belt' of single S/Ls cooperating with night-fighters patrolling defined 'boxes'. The pattern was designed to ensure that raids penetrating deeply towards the Midlands GDAs would cross more than one belt, and the GDAs had more S/Ls at close spacing. The number of LAA units to protect Vital Points such as airfields was growing, albeit slowly.

After December 1941, the division's order of battle was as follows:

32nd AA Brigade

- 136th HAA Rgt (new regiment formed October 1941; left March–April 1942; returned June 1942)
- 45th LAA Rgt (from the 41st AA Brigade August 1942; left September 1942)
- 64th LAA Rgt (to the 41st AA Brigade by May 1942)
- 120th LAA Rgt (converted from S/L; joined September 1942)
- 134th LAA Rgt (new regiment joined February–March 1942; left May–June 1942)
- 41st S/L Rgt
- 44th S/L Rgt (to the 66th AA Brigade December 1941)
- 58th S/L Rgt
- 60th S/L Rgt (from the 41st AA Brigade January 1942; left and converted to 126th LAA February–March 1942)
- 65th S/L Rgt

40th AA Brigade

- 30th LAA Rgt (left December 1941)
- 33rd LAA Rgt (left December 1941)
- 96th LAA Rgt (new regiment joined December 1941; left by May 1942)
- 138th LAA Rgt (new regiment joined June 1942)
- 36th S/L Rgt
- 64th S/L Rgt (to the 32nd AA Brigade, May–June 1942)

41st AA Brigade

- 78th HAA Rgt (left April 1942)
- 82nd HAA Rgt
- 106th HAA Rgt (from 66th AA Brigade May 1942; left July 1942)
- 128th HAA Rgt (joined July 1942; left August 1942)
- 161st (Mixed) HAA Rgt (new regiment joined August 1942)
- 64th LAA Rgt (from 32nd AA Brigade by May 1942; left June 1942)
- 113th LAA Rgt (converted from S/L, joined March–April 1942)
- 126th LAA Rgt (converted from 60th S/L Rgt, joined May 1942)
- 60th S/L Rgt (to the 32nd AA Brigade January 1942)
- 69th S/L Rgt
- 72nd S/L Rgt

50th AA Brigade

- 144th (Mixed) HAA Rgt (from 66th AA Brigade August 1942)
- 20th LAA (joined August 1942)
- 111th LAA (left July 1942)
- 139th LAA (new regiment joined August 1942; left September 1942)
- 42nnd S/L Rgt
- 50th S/L Rgt (left May–June 1942)
- 15th AA 'Z' Rgt (from the 66th AA Brigade August 1942)

66th AA Brigade

- 106th HAA Rgt (to the 41st AA Brigade May 1942)
- 113th HAA Rgt (left March 1942)
- 144th (Mixed) HAA Rgt (new regiment joined by May 1942; to the 50th AA Brigade August 1942)
- 38th LAA Rgt (left December 1941)
- 45th LAA Rgt (joined by May 1942; to the 32nd AA Brigade August 1942)
- 44th S/L Rgt (from the 32nd AA Brigade December 1941; left by May 1942)
- 15th AA 'Z' Rgt (to the 50th AA Brigade August 1942)

'Mixed' indicates that women of the Auxiliary Territorial Service (ATS) were integrated into the unit.

The increased sophistication of Operations Rooms and communications was reflected in the growth in support units, which attained the following organisation by May 1942:

- 2nd AA Division Mixed Signal Unit HQ, RCS
  - HQ No 1 Company
    - 2nd AA Division Mixed Signal Office Section
    - 40th AA Brigade Signal Office Mixed Sub-Section
    - 104th RAF Fighter Sector Sub-Section
    - 41st AA Brigade Signal Office Mixed Sub-Section
    - 115th RAF Fighter Sector Sub-Section
    - 331st AA Gun Operations Room Mixed Signal Section
    - 333rd AA Gun Operations Room Mixed Signal Section
    - 6th AA Line Maintenance Section
  - HQ No 2 Company
    - 32nd AA Brigade Signal Office Mixed Sub-Section
    - 105th RAF Fighter Sector Sub-Section
    - 50th AA Brigade Signal Office Mixed Sub-Section
    - 106th RAF Fighter Sector Sub-Section
    - 407th AA Gun Operations Room Mixed Signal Section
    - 22nd AA Sub-Gun Operations Room Mixed Signal Sub-Section
    - 24th AA Sub-Gun Operations Room Mixed Signal Sub-Section
    - 66th AA Brigade Signal Office Mixed Sub-Section
    - 324th AA Gun Operations Room Mixed Signal Section
    - 6th AA Line Maintenance Section
- HQ 2nd AA Div RASC
  - 904th, 929th, 932nd Companies
- HQ 2nd AA Div RAMC
- 2nd AA Div Workshop Company, RAOC
- 2nd AA Div Radio Maintenance Company, RAOC

The RAOC companies became part of the new Royal Electrical and Mechanical Engineers (REME) during 1942.

The 66th AA Brigade HQ, with its signal section and transport company, left AA Command in August 1942 and came under War Office control ready to join First Army in the invasion of North Africa (Operation Torch).

== Disbandment ==
The 2nd AA Division, like the other AA Corps and Divisions, was disbanded and replaced on 1 October 1942 by a new AA Group structure. The Midlands and East Anglia were covered by the 5th AA Group, headquartered at Hucknall. The 2nd AA Divisional Signals was apparently converted into the new Group signal unit.

== General Officer Commanding ==
The following officers commanded the 2nd AA Division:

- Major-General James Harrison (1 September 1936 – 29 May 1939)
- Major-General Maurice Grove-White (30 May 1939 – 10 November 1940)
- Major-General Francis Crossman (12 November 1940 – 30 September 1942)

== See also ==
- List of British divisions in World War II
- Structure of the British Army in 1939
