= 4th (City of London) Battalion, London Regiment =

1st Tower Hamlets Rifle Volunteer Brigade 4th City of London Regiment 60th (City of London) Heavy AA Regiment
- Active: 6 April 1860 – 1 May 1961
- Country: United Kingdom
- Branch: Territorial Army
- Role: Infantry; Air Defence
- Size: 27 Companies (1874); 4 Battalions (WWI); 3 Batteries (WWII)
- Garrison/HQ: Shaftesbury Street, Hoxton (4th Londons); Bromley Road, Catford (60th HAA)
- Engagements: Second Boer War; WWI: 1st Bn: 2nd Ypres; Gommecourt; Ginchy; Flers–Courcelette; Morval; Le Transloy; Arras; Langemarck; Cambrai; Oppy Wood; Albert; 2nd Bn: Gallipoli; Senussi Campaign; Bullecourt; Menin Road; Passchendaele; St Quentin; Villers-Bretonneux; Chipilly; WWII: Battle of France; Dunkirk evacuation; The Blitz; Normandy; Caen; Rhineland

The 4th (City of London) Battalion, London Regiment (Royal Fusiliers) was a Volunteer unit of Britain's Territorial Army (TA) recruited from East London. During World War I it raised four battalions, which carried out garrison duty in Malta and Egypt, served at Gallipoli and against the Senussi, and saw a great deal of action on the Western Front, notably in the Attack on the Gommecourt Salient in 1916, at Bullecourt in 1917 and at Oppy Wood and Chipilly Ridge in 1918. During World War II it served as an anti-aircraft regiment in the Battle of France and during the Blitz in 1940 and in North West Europe in 1944–45. It continued in the TA until 1961.

== Volunteer Force ==
An invasion scare in 1859 led to the creation of the Volunteer Force and huge enthusiasm for joining local Rifle Volunteer Corps (RVCs). The Tower Hamlets area of East London was no exception. The first RVC in the area was short-lived, but the 2nd (Hackney) Tower Hamlets RVC formed on 6 April 1860 at Dalston soon had seven companies:

- No 1 Company at Hackney
- No 2 Company at Dalston
- No 3 Company at Bow
- Nos 4, 5 & 6 Companies at Poplar and Limehouse
- No 7 Company at Clapton

By the end of the year the HQ had moved to South Hackney. One of the original officers was Captain Joseph d'Aguilar Samuda, a Thames-side shipbuilder.

Similarly, the 4th Tower Hamlets RVC was formed in June 1860 at St Leonard's, Shoreditch, initially with five companies, and the 6th Tower Hamlets RVC at Dalston in September 1860, with eight companies by the end of the year (many recruits probably coming from the failed 1st Tower Hamlets RVC).

The 4th Tower Hamlets RVC moved its HQ to Robert Street, Hoxton in 1864, and in 1868 merged with the 2nd Corps to form the 1st Tower Hamlets Rifle Volunteer Brigade (THVRB), with 15 companies (seven from the 2nd, eight from the 4th), adopting Robert St as its HQ. The 6th Corps adopted the title of North East London Rifles in 1865, and on 1 January 1874 it too merged its 12 companies into the 1st Tower Hamlets, initially giving 27 companies, soon reduced to 16 and later 12. By now the unit had moved its HQ to the former 6th Tower Hamlets RVC HQ at 112 Shaftesbury Street, off City Road in Hoxton. Its regimental badge was the White Tower of the Tower of London and it adopted scarlet uniforms (in place of the grey of many early Volunteer units).

When the Cardwell Reforms introduced 'Localisation of the Forces' in 1873, the THRVB was brigaded, together with several other Volunteer and Militia battalions in the London area, in Brigade No 53 & 54 under the Rifle Brigade. As part of the Childers Reforms in 1881, the THRVB became a Volunteer Battalion of the Rifle Brigade, but without changing its title or its scarlet uniform faced with blue. When the Volunteers were assigned a role in the mobilisation scheme outlined by the Stanhope Memorandum of 1888, the Tower Hamlets RVCs formed part of the East London Brigade, together with the City of London RVCs and the Middlesex RVCs formed by employees of the Customs and Post Office. The brigade was administered by the Scots Guards.

The THRVB formed a Machine Gun Battery in 1886, and this became the nucleus of the MG section of the City Imperial Volunteers (CIV) that served in the 2nd Boer War. One officer and 38 other ranks (ORs) of the battalion served with the CIV, and a further two officers and 61 ORs with other units. This service gained the battalion its first Battle honour, South Africa 1900. After the Boer war the Volunteer Infantry Brigades were reorganised and the THRVB was posted to the 2nd London Brigade, administered by the newly-formed Irish Guards.

The THRVB transferred from the Rifle Brigade to the Royal Fusiliers (The City of London Regiment) on 7 May 1903 when its title changed to the 4th Volunteer Battalion, Royal Fusiliers. Subsequently, it became part of the Royal Fusiliers Brigade in the mobilisation scheme.

== Territorial Force ==
On the formation of the Territorial Force (TF) in 1908 as part of the Haldane Reforms, the Volunteer units in and around London were formed into a new London Regiment, with the 4th Volunteer Battalion of the Royal Fusiliers becoming the 4th (City of London) Battalion, the London Regiment (Royal Fusiliers), conveniently shortened to '4th Londons'. At the time of the transfer to the TF, the 4th VB had 47 officers, 71 sergeants and 1230 ORs. Of these, 32 officers and 452 non-commissioned officers and ORs transferred to the new 4th Londons, many of the others transferring to new TF units of the Army Service Corps and Royal Army Medical Corps or to mounted units being formed. The 1st–4th Bns London Regiment (formerly the 1st–4th VBs Royal Fusiliers) remained brigaded together as the 1st London Brigade of the 1st London Division of the TF.

== World War I ==
=== Mobilisation ===
The 1st London Division left by train from Waterloo station on Sunday 2 August 1914 for its annual training camp, which was to be held at Wareham, Dorset. No sooner had the 4th Londons reached camp than it received orders to return to London for mobilisation. This process had been carefully planned, and was completed on 3 August, the battalion entraining again shortly after midnight, so that before war was declared on 4 August the battalions of the 1st London Brigade were already at their war stations, guarding the vital London and South Western Railway line between Waterloo and Southampton. The 4th Londons were assigned the length from Waterloo to Farnborough, Hampshire, and the branch line to Alton and Bordon Camp. The Transport Section remained at Hoxton to complete mobilisation.

On the night of 31 August/1 September the 1st London Bde was ordered back to its peacetime headquarters to mobilise for garrison duty overseas. On 4 September the 4th Londons entrained at Waterloo for Southampton, there to embark on HM Transport Galician bound for Malta. Four officers and a small number of NCOs and men ruled medically unfit for overseas service were left at Hoxton to begin recruiting a reserve battalion. Shortly afterwards this was designated the 2/4th Londons, after which the parent unit became the 1/4th Battalion. Later the 3/4th and 4/4th Battalions were also raised (see below).

=== 1/4th Battalion ===
==== Malta 1914 ====
The battalions of the 1st London Bde were the first TF units to go on service overseas. The 1/4th Londons disembarked in Malta on 14 September and began coastal defence and guard duties as well as training the 250 recruits in its ranks. On 2 January 1915 the 1/4th Bn was relieved by the 2/4th Bn (leaving its obsolete rifles and equipment for the newcomers) and embarked on HMT Avon for Marseille in France.

==== Neuve Chapelle ====
After re-equipping with charger-loading Long Lee-Enfield rifles and 1914 pattern webbing equipment, 1/4th Londons joined GHQ Reserve at Saint-Omer for further training on 25 January. The battalion joined the Ferozepore Brigade of the 3rd (Lahore) Division on 20 February.

At the beginning of the Battle of Neuve Chapelle on 10 March the Ferozepore Brigade was in Army Reserve, but it moved up on 12 March, the 1/4th Londons relieving the 41st Dogras of the 7th (Meerut) Division after an exhausting approach march: 'This position was perhaps not an ideal one for the first introduction of a raw battalion to trench warfare'. The planned attack did not materialise, and the 1/4th Londons returned to billets, having suffered 14 wounded. The battalion then entered the round of spells of trench duty alternating with periods in reserve.

==== 2nd Ypres ====
The Germans launched an attack preceded by poison gas at Ypres on 22 April. On 23 and 24 April the 1/4th Bn force-marched towards the Ypres Salient and went into the firing line on 26 April, digging new assembly trenches on a reverse slope. At 14.30 the battalion moved up in support of a British counter-attack, but the attack had failed, and the Londons marched across open ground under shrapnel shell fire to a sunken lane where the remnants of the attackers were sheltering. Here they dug a new temporary line. The following day the attack was renewed, the battalion coming under fire as it crossed the crest line. Heavy casualties were suffered in the valley beyond, until the battalion was withdrawn into brigade reserve after nightfall. The Ferozepore Brigade was relieved on 30 April and withdrew under shellfire. Between 26 and 30 April the 1/4th Londons had lost 365 out of 600 men; while withdrawing it was joined by a draft of 50 from the 3/4th Londons.

The weak Ferozepore Brigade immediately went into hastily dug support lines behind the Meerut Division's attacks on Aubers Ridge (9 May) and Festubert (15/16 May), where it was shelled but was not involved in the disastrous attacks. The 1/4th Londons also suffered a large number of casualties from sickness in its shallow trenches. After this, the reinforcement problems meant that the Indian Corps was not used offensively for the rest of the year, and 1/4th Londons spent the summer of 1915 taking turns in holding sections of trench in the La Bassée Road area and providing working parties while suffering a trickle of casualties.

The Lahore Division was transferred to Mesopotamia in November 1915, but its British battalions remained in France. 1/4th Londons were briefly attached to the 46th (North Midland) Division but almost immediately joined 140th (4th London) Brigade in 47th (1/2nd London) Division. The division spent the next month in training, before re-entering the line in the very active Hohenzollern redoubt sector. Being still weak in numbers, the 1/4th Londons were kept in reserve, but their bombing parties did go into the front line to reinforce other units under pressure from trench raids.

==== 56th (1/1st London) Division ====
In February 1916 the battalion returned to the 1st London Division, which was being reformed in France as the 56th (1/1st London) Division, with the battalion assigned to the 2nd London Brigade numbered as 168th (2nd London) Brigade. On 7 May the battalion received a large draft of veterans of Gallipoli and Egypt from the 2/4th Bn which was being disbanded (see below). Further drafts were received from the 2/4th and 4/4th Bns in May and June, bringing it up to strength.

56th Division was scheduled to undertake its first operation in the Attack on the Gommecourt Salient at the start of the Battle of the Somme. On the night of 25/26 May the 1/4th Bn dug a new jumping-off trench half-way across No man's land. Over following days and nights this position was enlarged and linked with communication trenches, during which the battalion suffered a trickle of casualties.

1/4th practised the attack on 6 June, but as a support unit its rehearsals were less detailed, and the battalion carried out weeks of night labour. It returned to the line on 27 June, where in the days preceding the attack it came under the sharp German counter-bombardment, losing numerous casualties.

==== Gommecourt ====
When the 1/12th Londons (The Rangers) went over the top on 1 July, 1/4th Londons moved up to occupy their vacated jumping-off trenches, with A Company to the right, C Company to the left and D Company in reserve. Half of B Company was being used as carrying parties, while the other half (two platoons) were to follow the Rangers to clear German dugouts. However, these two platoons had already lost a third of their strength while waiting to move up. Only 10 men from this half-company returned at the end of the day's fighting. The battalion found the Rangers' trenches badly damaged by the German counter-bombardment, and the Germans were laying a curtain of shellfire across No man's land.

During the morning, A and C Companies of the 1/4th were ordered forward through this barrage to reinforce the Rangers. Those men of A Company who got across No man's land were soon left leaderless when all their officers became casualties, and the survivors were 'mopped up' by German troops and taken prisoner; only 18 men of the company returned after the attack. Similarly the two platoons of C company that attacked lost their officers and the survivors were brought out of action by the Company Sergeant-Major. When the battalion's carrying parties tried to cross No man's land with supplies at 10.45, they were driven back with heavy casualties by the German barrage, while the reserve companies in the British line were suffering badly from German Howitzer fire. D Company, having already suffered 50 per cent casualties, was ordered to send over another carrying party; all the men became casualties. At 13.00, the battalion was ordered to send forward a company to support what was left of the Rangers and 1/4th Bn in the German trenches, but at 13.30 the British hold on the German trenches was broken by counter-attacks and the survivors attempted to retreat over No-man's land. At 14.30, Battalion HQ was hit by a howitzer shell (the commanding officer (CO), Lt-Col L.L. Wheatley, was dug out alive), and at 15.30 the CO was given permission to withdraw the shattered battalion from the jumping-off trench to the reserve line. The battalion had suffered 50 per cent casualties in the action, even though less than half of it had even left the British lines. One wounded Private of the battalion, stuck in the mud in No man's land, was rescued 14 days after the battle.

The Gommecourt attack had been a diversion and no further attack was made in the area. The reduced battalions of 56th Division had to hold their line until 20 August. The battalion received a large number of replacement officers and NCOs from the 2/4th, 3/4th and 4/4th Bns. After being relieved, the 56th Division moved to the southern Somme sector, where it trained with the first tanks to arrive in France.

==== Ginchy ====
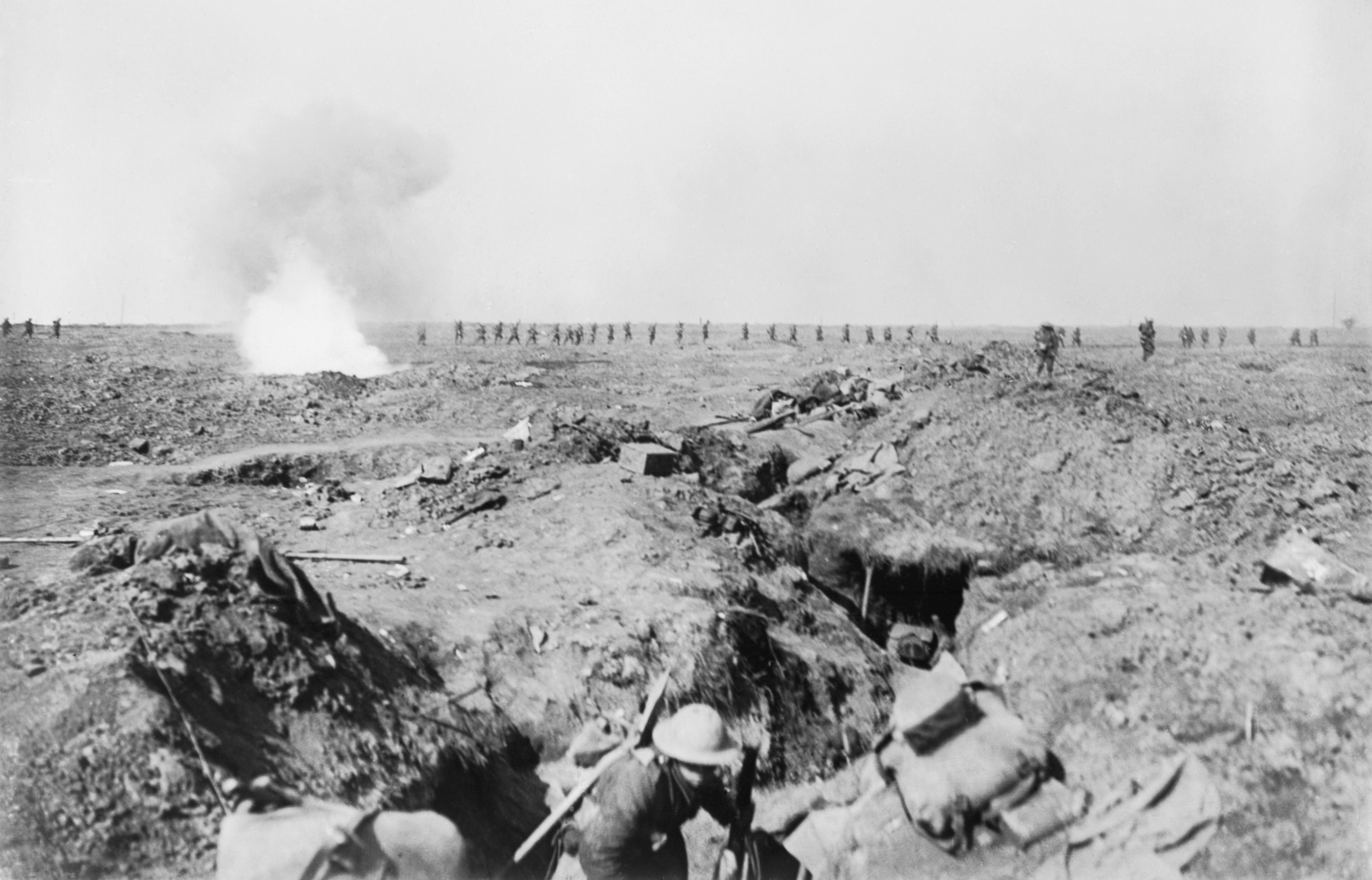
British troops advancing during the Battle of Ginchy

On 5 September 1916 the 56th Division went back into the line during the Battle of Ginchy. 1/4th Londons were in brigade reserve along the Wedge Wood–Ginchy road, where they suffered casualties from shellfire while digging assembly trenches for the next phase of the offensive. This began on 9 September, when the battalion led the brigade's right hand assault. The crowded trenches were heavily shelled before they went 'over the top', at 16.45, but the battalion successfully pivoted towards its objective and followed the new-style creeping barrage. However, its objective was a trench that had either been obliterated or never existed, so the men overshot into the now-stationary barrage. When the barrage resumed advancing at 17.25, the mixed up companies of the battalion captured their second objective ('Beef' Trench). By now, both flanks were 'in the air' (particularly on the left, where the Rangers had been held up by the 'Quadrilateral'). After dark the main objective was only held by advanced parties while the rest of the battalion cleared an intermediate position ('Bully' Trench) in their rear. These advanced posts were withdrawn the following morning while the flanks were strengthened. The battalion was relieved from Bully Trench at midnight on 10/11 September. The total casualties over the five days were 20 officers and about 250 ORs.

==== Morval ====
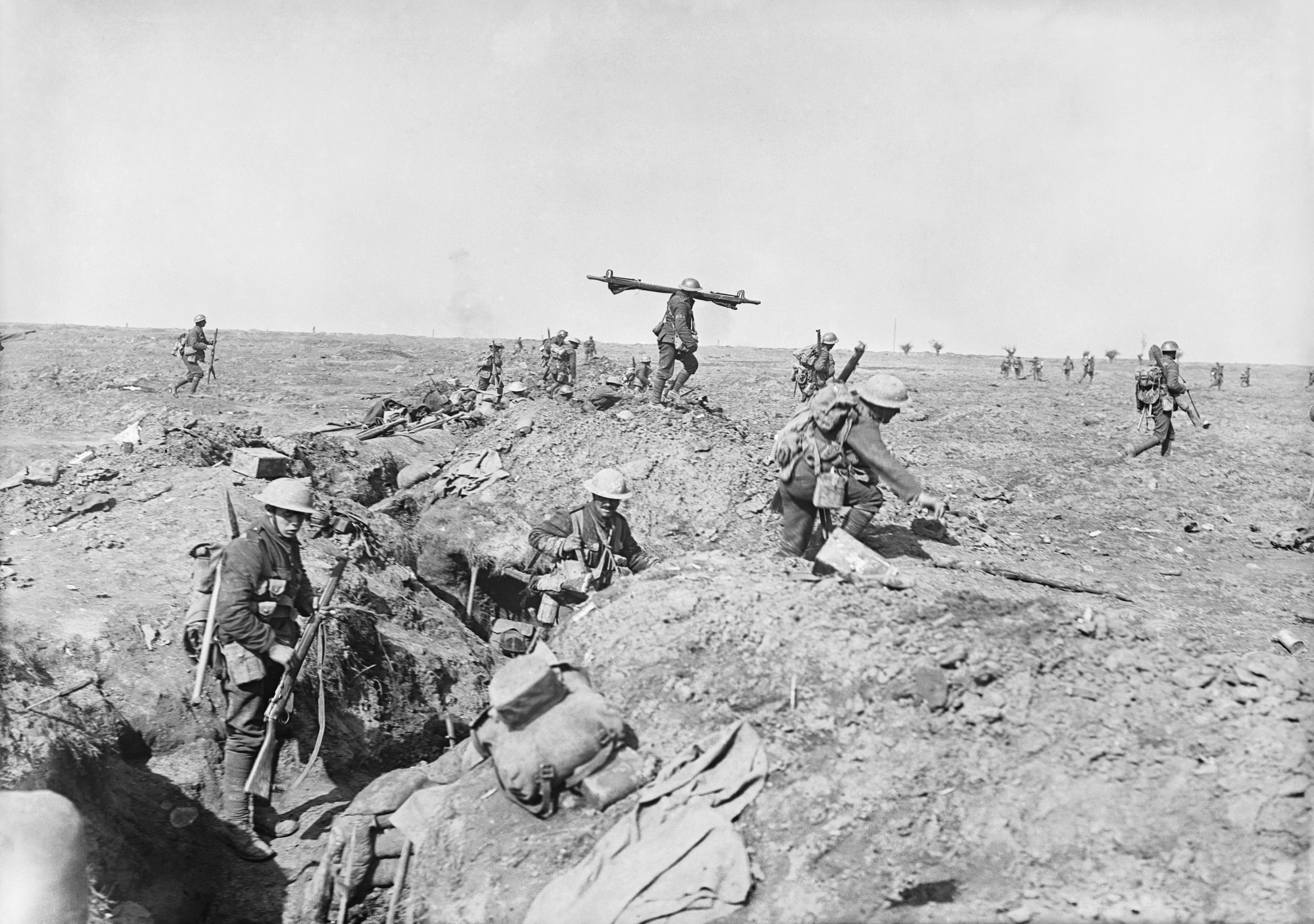
British troops at Morval 25 September 1916

For the Battle of Flers–Courcelette, 1/4th Londons were to follow the assault of 167th (1st London) Bde towards Bouleaux Wood and then 'leap-frog' through it onto the German third line. The attack went in at 06.20 on 15 September, and 1/4th Londons left their bivouacs at 09.00. Progress was slow due to mud and German shellfire, and the battalion was recalled before it had got far, when the rest of the failed attack was cancelled. It was the same story when the division made a second attempt on 18 September: this time the battalion came under heavy German fire, lost a good many men, and had to shelter in muddy shell-craters until the attack was called off. When it was renewed on 25 September (the Battle of Morval) the 1/4th Londons were the right assaulting battalion of 168th Bde, tasked with clearing the northern end of Bouleaux Wood. B and C Companies went over the top at 12.42, seven minutes after zero, to allow other units to come into line, and followed an effective creeping barrage onto the objectives with little opposition, driving the defenders in front of the Lewis guns of the 1/14th Londons (London Scottish). Consolidation of the strongpoints in the wood was hampered by enemy snipers but the positions gained gave excellent observation over the enemy defences. Casualties in this successful operation were only 32.

==== Le Transloy ====
The battalion dug assembly positions for the next phase of the offensive (the Battle of Le Transloy) and was relieved, then unexpectedly brought forward again to act as the centre battalion in 168th Bde's attack on 7 October. The battalion attacked at 13.47, two minutes after the start of the barrage. D Company was virtually wiped out by enemy machine guns in the gun pits that were the objective; C Company was able to take cover in shell holes in dead ground, but B Company, following up, was met by the German counter-bombardment. The remaining attackers lay out in No man's land, no further than 50 yards from their starting position, trying to get round the gun pits, until darkness began to fall and German counter-attacks developed. The battalion was withdrawn having suffered 300 casualties.

When the battalion reached its rest billets it had been reduced to 275 all ranks. There followed months of light training and line-holding in the Neuve Chapelle sector while the units of 56th Division were slowly rebuilt. Despite further casualties while holding the line, 1/4th Londons attained a strength of 850 all ranks when it returned to active operations in March 1917.

==== Arras ====
In March 1917 the 56th Division was preparing to attack as part of the forthcoming Battle of Arras when patrols discovered that the Germans in front had disappeared – the beginning of their retreat to the Hindenburg Line. At Arras this retreat was minor, so the attack went in on schedule on 9 April, from old German communication trenches, where the 1/4th Londons hurriedly had to dig fresh assembly trenches. The battalion was in support for the attack, B Company advancing to 'mop up' behind the Rangers and 1/13th Londons (Kensingtons)), the remainder moving forward in the afternoon to fill a gap in the line and then consolidate.

The Arras Offensive was renewed on 3 May and went badly for 56th Division, but 168th Bde was in reserve and was not engaged. The following day it took over the whole divisional front under heavy shellfire. On 10 May the battalion was ordered to clear up a troublesome German outpost at 'Cavalry Farm'. The attack was made without any increase in artillery fire, and so came as a surprise to the defenders of the farm, which was quickly seized and consolidated.

==== Langemarck ====
In August 1917, 56th Division moved to the Ypres Salient to take part in the second phase of the Third Ypres Offensive (the Battle of Langemarck). It formed the right flank of the attack, with 53rd Bde from 18th (Eastern) Division under its command on the extreme right. At a late stage 1/4th Londons were attached to the weak 53rd Bde for this operation, but the CO, Lt-Col H. Campbell, was wounded on the way to meet the brigadier, and his second-in-command had less than 24 hours to reconnoitre and prepare the attack, in muddy terrain, with the start line changed at the last moment. The battalion left its mud holes and followed the barrage at 05.45 on 16 August, but 7th Bn Bedfordshire Regiment was unable to take a concrete pillbox, which caused many casualties to the 1/4th Londons, who were brought to a standstill and could do no more than form a defensive flank along the edge of Glencorse Wood. Twelve officers and 182 ORs had been killed or wounded. The division was pulled out of the line the following day for reorganisation.

==== Cambrai ====
The casualties from the Ypres fighting were not replaced, and the whole division was numerically weak, companies in 1/4th Londons being reduced to just two effective platoons. 56th Division was given the task of making a demonstration with dummy tanks and figures on the flank of the great tank attack that opened the Battle of Cambrai on 20 November. The demonstration succeeded in attracting German defensive fire, though 1/4th Londons were in reserve behind the line. The battalion moved up early on 23 November to relieve the London Scottish, who were advancing into Tadpole Copse, and later in the day its companies were drawn into the fighting in the Hindenburg Line trenches with hand and rifle grenades and Lewis guns that lasted three days and cost the battalion 60 casualties before it was relieved and went to hold a quieter sector of the line.

Due to manpower shortages the BEF disbanded one in four of its infantry battalions in February 1918: the 1/4th Bn received drafts from the disbanded 1/3rd Londons (167th Bde), 1/9th Londons (Queen Victoria's Rifles) (169th (3rd London) Brigade) and 2/1st Londons (58th (2/1st London) Division), enabling the battalion to reorganise with three platoons per company.

==== Oppy Wood ====
Oppy Wood, 1917. Evening by John Nash

The German spring offensive opened on 21 March 1918 some miles south of 56th Division's positions outside Arras. The 1/4th Bn prepared a defensive flank facing south in case the line was turned, but no attack developed until 03.00 on 28 March (Operation Mars) when the battalion's outposts in Oppy Wood came under heavy bombardment. The two forward companies were overrun by 09.00, despite causing heavy casualties with their Lewis guns. The other two companies in the support trench (the Marquis line) then held the attackers while the defensive flank (Ouse Alley) was manned by details from Advanced Battalion HQ, and artillery fire was brought down on the captured outposts. By 11.30 the pressure on both flanks was too great, and the defenders withdrew to the Red Line (held by the London Scottish), having to go cross-country because Ouse Alley was cut behind them. The Red Line was not seriously attacked: despite the 1/4th Bn's sacrifice (19 killed, 45 wounded, 171 captured and missing), the tactic of holding an outpost line to break up enemy attacks was considered a success.

Relieved and moving to a rest area, the 1/4th Bn was lucky to receive two drafts of fully trained reinforcements totalling 420 men, but they came from all over the UK, diluting the Cockney nature of the battalion. For several months the battalion did its share of line holding outside Arras, interspersed with occasional trench raids and bombardments.

==== The Hundred Days ====
The Allied counter-offensive (the Hundred Days Offensive) began in summer 1918, the 56th Division joining in at the Battle of Albert on 23 August. After rushed preparations, the 1/4th Londons attacked behind an intense barrage at 05.07 towards the village of Boyelles and the trench system at Boisleux-Saint-Marc. Four tanks assisted against Boyelles, where the garrison surrendered, but the left of the battalion was held up by the Marc position until the troops on either flank pressed forward and cleared it. The battalion resumed the advance at 16.30, attacking in widely extended formation and suffering few casualties, capturing machine guns and patrolling 500 yards beyond the Germans' Boyelles Reserve trenches.

Another rushed attack went in on 28 August, towards Bullecourt to clear a section of the Hindenburg Line. 1/4th Londons led 168th Bde in support of 169th Bde, some of whom went astray, so the battalion had to mop up obstinate German pockets and it was not until late evening that the area was cleared. The division continued the attack next day, 1/4th Londons being in support. Bullecourt having been recaptured by the Germans, the division attacked again on 31 August, with 1/4th Londons in the centre, clearing the village by mid-afternoon. The battalion gained satisfaction from finally capturing Bullecourt, where the 2/4th Bn (see below) had fought the previous year.

When the assault crossing of the Canal du Nord began on 27 September, the 1/4th Londons watched as the rest of the division advanced across their front along the far bank of the canal, before following up themselves on the near (west) bank against slight opposition. The advance was now a pursuit, held up only by German rearguards. On 6 October, patrols from the 1/4th Londons entered Aubencheul-au-Bac without opposition, taking the line as far as the Sensée Canal.

The battalion was withdrawn for rest, and did not return to the line until 3 November, when it followed up in conjunction with units of Australian Light Horse and New Zealand cyclists. The following day a rushed attack made considerable progress until the battalion ran into stiff resistance at the Aunelle river crossing at Sebourg. The battalion was in support for further attacks over the next few days, but was not involved in any more fighting before the Armistice came into force on 11 November.

Demobilisation began in early 1919, and the battalion was reduced to a cadre of 50 men by mid-May. The cadre returned to England on 21 May and marched through London to Hoxton.

==== Commanding officers ====
The following officers commanded 1/4th Bn during World War I:

- Lt-Col G.P. Botterill, from mobilisation, wounded 26 April 1915
- Maj L.T. Burnett, acting, 26 April to 16 June 1915
- Lt-Col Leslie Burnett, OBE, promoted 16 June 1915, sick 19 January 1916
- Maj W.J. Clarke, acting, 19 January to 23 March 1916
- Lt-Col L.L. Wheatley, DSO (Argyll and Sutherland Highlanders), from 8 April, sick 11 October 1916
- Lt-Col H.J. Duncan-Teape, 11 October 1916 to 17 March 1917
- Lt-Col A.E. Maitland, MC (Essex Regiment), from 18 March, sick 12 April 1917
- Lt-Col H. Campbell, DSO (13th Londons (Kensingtons)) from 12 April, wounded 14 August 1917
- Lt-Col A.F. Marchment, DSO, MC (1st Londons), from 14 August 1917 to the Armistice

=== 2/4th Battalion ===
Within a week of formation, the 2/4th Bn had over 250 men, rising to 500 by 15 September and on 23 September it moved from Hoxton to Folly Farm, Hadley Wood, which provided larger premises for training than the cramped drill hall. The four officers left behind by 1/4th Bn struggled to organise the recruits and sought help from the London TF Association; Colonel Vickers Dunfee, who had retired from command of the 4th Londons in 1908, returned as CO of the battalion. By 19 October the battalion was over 1000 strong and had taken over several large houses to increase the accommodation. The men had received their uniforms but there were only a handful of rifles for training. On 14 December the battalion entrained for Maidstone to join the rest of 2/1st London Brigade. Here it was ordered at short notice to embark at Southampton Docks on 23 December aboard HMT Avon bound for Malta to relieve the 1/4th Bn. The 2/4th disembarked on 2 January 1915 while the 1/4th went to the Western Front (see above) leaving a small party with the 2/4th.

==== Malta 1915 ====
While on Malta the 2/4th Bn was stationed at St George's Barracks and continued training, being issued with Long Lee–Enfield rifles and carrying out a musketry course under sergeant-instructors from the Royal Marine Light Infantry. The machine-gunners, stretcher-bearers and transport drivers also undertook training. The eight TF companies were amalgamated into four according to the Regular Army establishment. The battalion guarded Prisoners of war (PoWs) and performed public duties. It also provided working parties to unload and load stores destined for the Gallipoli campaign, and its stretcher-bearers carried many of the casualties off the hospital ships. The battalion was still regarded as a draft-finding unit for 1/4th Bn, and in July was under orders to send a draft of 400 men to the Western Front (to be replaced by 400 men from the 4/4th Bn at home). However, it was instead ordered to Egypt as a Service Battalion, embarking on HMT Southlands on 21 August and disembarking at Alexandria four days later. By the end of August the whole of 2/1st London Brigade was concentrated at Alexandria.

==== Gallipoli ====
Between 6 and 9 October the battalion re-embarked on HMT Karroo and sailed for Mudros, where on 15 October it transhipped to HMT Sarnia and landed next day on 'W Beach' on the Gallipoli Peninsula. Here the units of 2/1st London Brigade were attached to the Royal Naval Division, the 2/3rd and 2/4th Bns joining 1st Royal Naval Brigade. At first the battalion's only duties were to provide working parties.

The 2/4th Londons received their introduction to trench warfare in the 'Eski' reserve line between 20 and 27 October, and suffered their first battle casualties. Thereafter they did seven-day tours of duty in the reserve line alternating with 'rest' in flooded camps in the rear. In December the battalion took over frontline trenches. Between 31 December and 8 January 1916 the battalion was evacuated to Mudros by detachments as the Gallipoli operation was closed down. During the campaign the battalion had lost 2 officers wounded, 16 ORs killed and 38 wounded, but many more men had been evacuated sick. The battalion's strength after evacuation, including the transport and other details who had remained at Mudros, amounted to 23 officers and 560 ORs. It was temporarily attached to the 29th Division. From Mudros the battalion was taken to Alexandria aboard HMT Ionian, arriving on 21 January.

==== Senussi campaign ====
In Egypt, the battalions of the 2/1st London Bde were attached to 53rd (Welsh) Division.was sent to join a force at Minia guarding the Nile against a potential attack by Senussi rebels. The 2/4th Londons' CO (Acting-Lt-Col V.H. Seyd, before Col Vickers Dunfee returned) commanded a force at Beni Mazar on the railway line consisting of HQ and three companies of the 2/4th and two companies of the 2/2nd Londons with detachments of Lovat's Scouts, Australian Light Horse, Royal Engineers and an armoured train. The force practised rapid entraining and detraining, and went on demonstration marches, but there was no trouble at Beni Mazar. The other company of the 2/4th guarded a bridge over the Bahr Yussef canal at Saqula, while the detachment of the 2/2nd guarded the Nile bridge at Nag Hammadi

The 2/4th Londons were withdrawn from Beni Mazar in April 1916 and returned to Alexandria, where the 2/1st London Brigade concentrated under the command of Col Dunfee. The battalions handed in their Long Lee–Enfields and drew modern Short Magazine Lee-Engfields in their place.On 17 April the brigade left 53rd (Welsh) Division and embarked on HMT Transylvania for Marseille.

=== New 2/4th Battalion ===
Once in France, the 2/1st London Brigade moved to Rouen, where it was disbanded. By 20 June all of the 'Old 2/4th' Bn had been drafted to the 1/4th Bn preparing for the attack at Gommecourt (see above). Col Dunfee commanded the 1/22nd Londons for a while, and then returned to the UK to take command of the 4/4th Bn. Meanwhile, the 3/4th Londons (see below), completing their training in the UK, were renumbered as the 'New' 2/4th Bn. The battalion formed part of 173rd (3/1st London) Brigade (popularly known as the Fusilier Brigade) in 58th (2/1st London) Division.

At the time of the renumbering, the 58th Division was carrying out coast defence duties in East Anglia, but on 10 July 1916 it concentrated at Sutton Veny for final training on Salisbury Plain. On 23 January 1917, the battalion embarked on HMT Viper at Southampton Docks for Le Havre, and joined the division concentrated around Lucheux. On 9 February the battalion went into the line for the first time, at Ransart, south of Arras. This was considered a quiet sector, and the 2/4th were introduced to trench warfare by units of the 49th (West Riding) Division. From February to April the 58th Division followed up the German retreat to the Hindenburg Line and was then put to work to repair the roads and railways destroyed by the retreating troops.

==== Bullecourt ====
Under heavy shellfire during the night of 13/14 May, 173rd Bde relieved the 15th Australian Brigade, which had been attacking at the Second Battle of Bullecourt. Captain G.E.A. Leake of C Company was recommended for a VC and was awarded an immediate DSO for single-handedly ejecting a German machine gun team attempting to take up a position to enfilade his men. A serious counter-attack against 2/4th Bn's position on 15 May was completely broken up by shell and small arms fire. The battalion was withdrawn after two days in the line, under bombardment for 19 hours, and having suffered 250 casualties.

==== Ypres ====
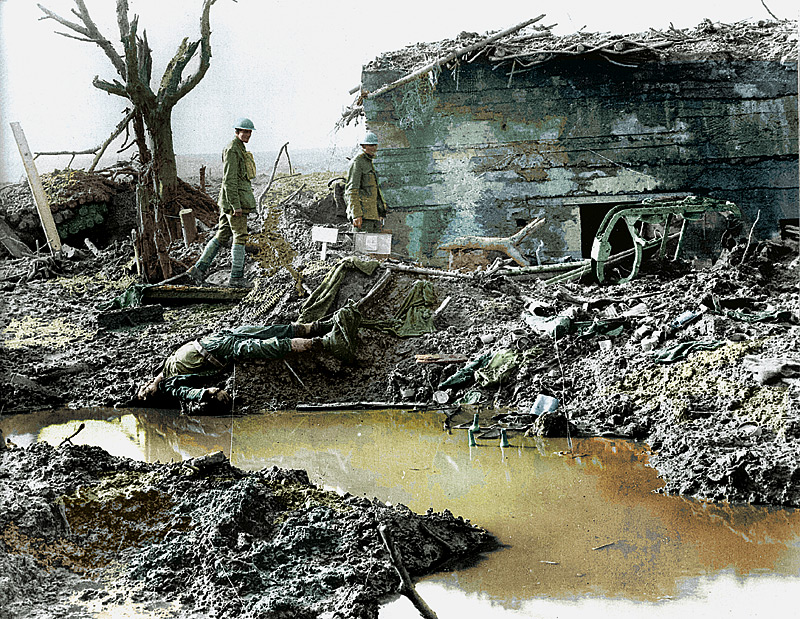
Captured German pillbox or 'Mebu' at Passchendaele

After a period of trench holding near Arras, the 58th Division moved to the Ypres Salient in late August 1917. In the attack of 20 September (the Battle of the Menin Road Ridge), the 2/4th Bn's objective was the strongly fortified area round 'Winnipeg Crossroads'. Assembling the attackers in the thick mud and darkness caused problems, but the attack went in at 05.40 behind an intense creeping barrage. One pillbox near the crossroads was captured single-handedly by Pte Bolton, another on the left caused a holdup until 2/Lt F.W. Walker outflanked it with a party of six men and rushed it. Only at Schuler Farm, where the supporting tanks were bogged down and the attacking platoon was almost wiped out, did the attack fail. The battalion was on its other objectives within half an hour, but casualties from shellfire had been severe. Similarly, British shellfire broke up a German counter-attack, and Schuler Farm was evacuated, so that the battalion handed over an intact position when relieved at 21.00 on 21 September. Although 58th Division participated in the Battle of Polygon Wood (26 September), 2/4th Bn was not engaged, and afterwards the 58th went into reserve.

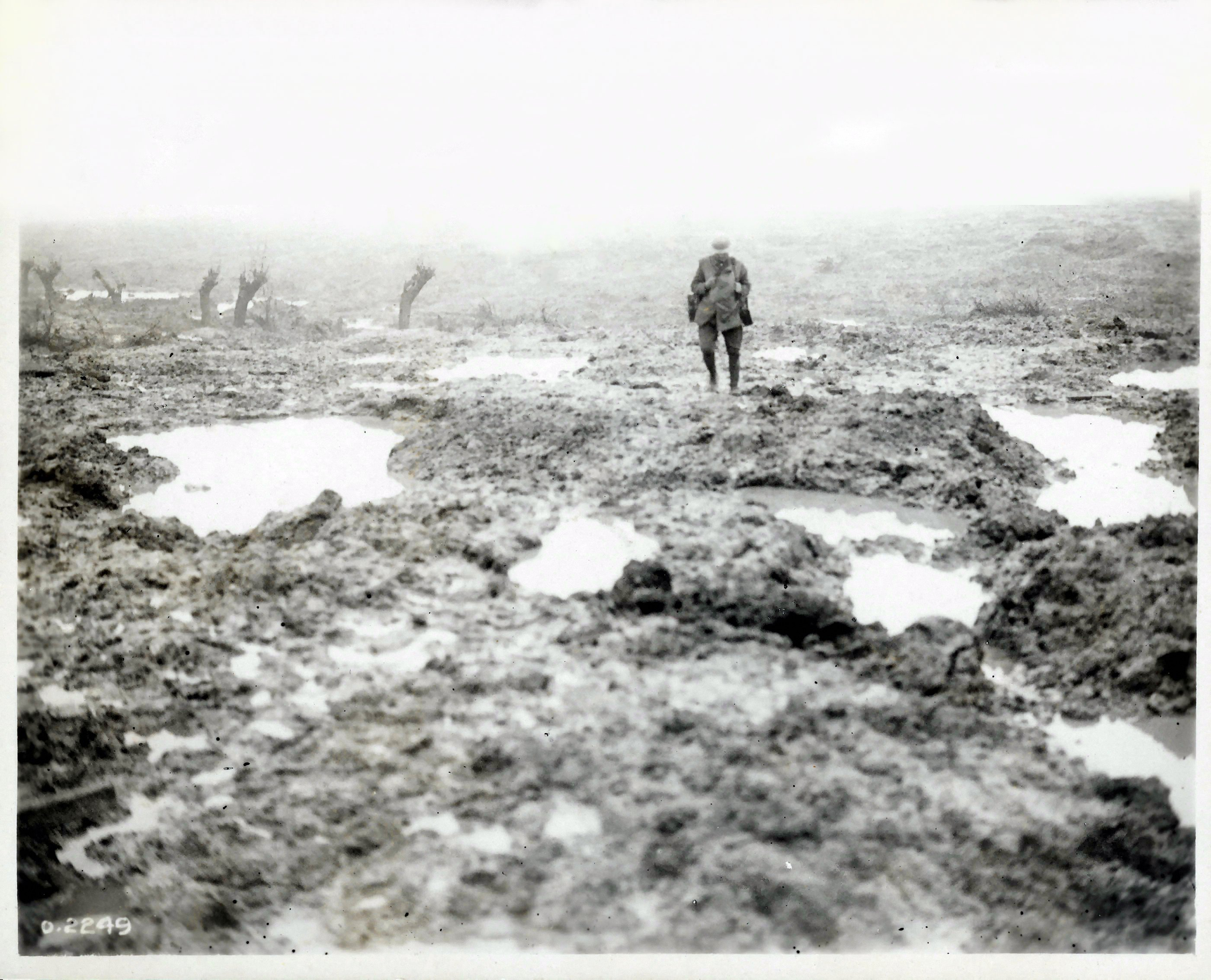
Passchendaele mud

The division returned to the line for the Second Battle of Passchendaele (26 October). As it arrived, the weather broke, and the division was forced to jump off from a line of flooded craters in the Poelcapelle area and struggle forward behind a barrage that advanced too quickly. 2/4th Londons were detailed to leap-frog through and take 173rd Bde's second objective, but the exhausted men, with hardly a rifle able to fire because of the mud, only took one post, at Tracas Farm before being pushed back to their start line. The battalion had to be relieved the same night, having suffered 359 casualties – the costliest day in 2/4th Bn's history – and it was reorganised as a single company.

The 2/4th Londons now spent a prolonged period out of the battle area, absorbing a draft of over 200 men, but remaining considerably under strength until February, when 2/1st Londons were disbanded and 220 of them joined 2/4th Bn. In December and January the battalion took its turn in trench-holding in the Salient until 58th Division was transferred to the south in January 1918. Here it spent time digging defences, converting former French positions into the newly devised defences in depth.

==== Spring Offensive ====
When the German spring offensive opened on 21 March 1918, 58th Division was positioned astride the River Oise with 173rd Bde north of the river at La Fère. It was covering a wide frontage of about 5000 yards with 2/2nd Londons in the Forward Zone and 2/4th Londons behind them in the Battle Zone, each company being in a 'defended locality' with a central keep and outlying redoubts, the wide spaces between being covered by machine guns. General Oskar von Hutier directed four German divisions under Von Gayl against this front. 173rd Brigade's Signal HQ was knocked out early in the bombardment and no orders went out, but Lt-Col Dann deployed the companies of 2/4th Londons to their positions on his own initiative. The whole position was shrouded in mist, aiding the German infiltration tactics. They cleared the Forward Zone by midday, and 2/4th Londons in the Battle Zone were engaged as the mist lifted. The battalion held on until nightfall, supported by detachments of 2/3rd Londons from reserve and the divisional pioneers of 1/4th Bn Suffolk Regiment. Most of C Company at the Triangle locality, supported by a single 18-pounder field gun, were eventually captured, but by midnight the rest of the battalion had withdrawn in good order across the Crozat Canal.

While 8th Londons held the canal, the three companies of 2/4th Londons dug in on the Vouel Line behind them. The German attack was renewed in the afternoon of 22 March, but the canal was held until nightfall, the only attacks on the Vouel Line coming from German artillery ranged in by spotter aircraft. The following day, the Vouel Line (now the British front line) became crowded with French troops from a failed counter-attack on the canal, while the left flank was 'in the air' after the retreat of 18th (Eastern) Division. The position became untenable at mid-day, when Lt-Col Dann ordered a withdrawal to the Green Line about 1500 yards back, and the battalion and the French troops had to fight their way back to this partly-dug position. With continued pressure on the open left flank, 173rd Bde was forced to withdraw again, beyond Viry-Noureuil. By now the fighting strength of 2/4th Londons was about 120 men, who came under the command of 8th Londons. However, the battalion's second-in-command, Major Grover, led up a scratch force of 280 clerks, cooks and drivers from the brigade's rear areas. By nightfall, 'Grover's Force' blocked the way to Chauny on the St. Quentin Canal, with the combined 2/4th and 8th Londons to his left and the 18th Entrenching Battalion (formed from disbanded battalions of 18th Division) to his right astride the canal.

The mixed force under 173rd Bde held out on the fourth day of the battle until the afternoon, when they made a planned withdrawal, and by 16.30 had retired across the Oise to join the rest of 58th Division. Here a composite 'Fusilier Battalion' was formed under Lt-Col Dann of the 2/4th, with a company drawn from each of the 2/2nd, 3rd, 2/4th and 8th Londons, which held the river crossings until relieved on the night of 25/26 March. Out of the line, Grover's Force and the Fusilier Battalion were reorganised, so that 2/4th Londons formed half of the Fusilier Battalion, which represented the whole of 173rd Bde.

==== Villers Bretonneux ====
58th Division was relieved by the French on 2/3 April and was moved by rail to cover Villers-Bretonneux against the continuing German advance. Between 21 March and 4 April the battalion had lost 38 men killed, 132 wounded, and 211 missing. The two companies in the Fusilier Bn were now joined by two companies from 16th Entrenching Bn (mostly from the disbanded 6th King's Own Yorkshire Light Infantry from the 14th (Light) Division), and a draft of young recruits from England to reconstitute the 2/4th Bn. After a period working on defences, the battalion went back into the front line on the evening of 18 April.

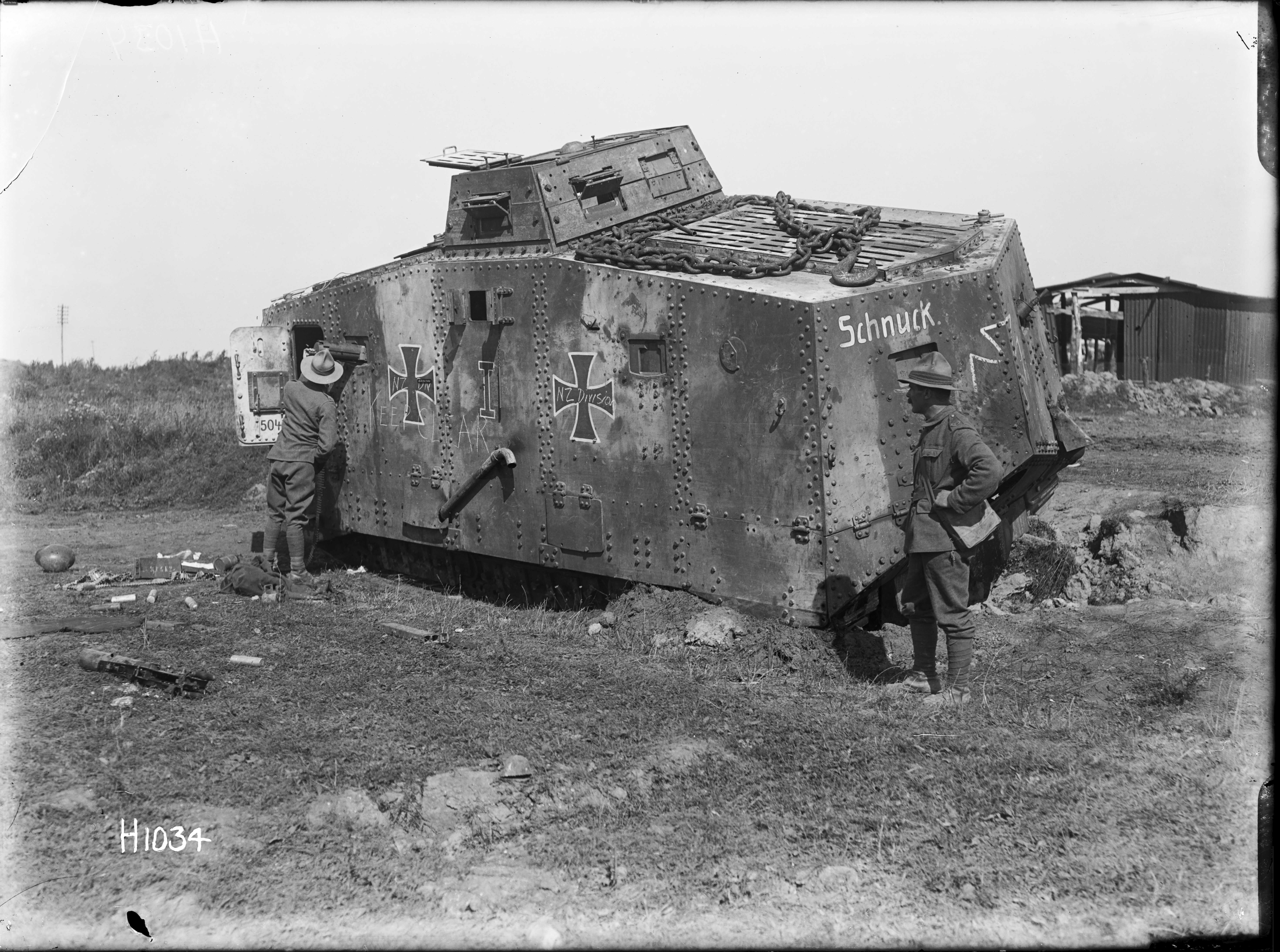
Knocked-out the A7V tank named Schnuck

The battered 173rd Bde was not involved with the rest of the division in the First Battle of Villers-Bretonneux, but was in the front line when the German Second Army launched the Second Battle of Villers-Bretonneux on 24 April. The battalion was attacked out of the mist by six German A7V tanks and fell back until they realised that the tanks were manoeuvring ineffectually, so they rallied at the company HQ line and then fell back slowly. They inflicted heavy casualties on the three following waves of German infantry, finally halting them at the Cachy Switch trench. 2/4th Bn's support company was almost cut off but also fought its way back to the Switch. An 18-pounder gun was manhandled to Lt-Col Dann's Bn HQ, where it drove back the remaining German tanks, A counter-attack the following day regained Villers-Bretonneux and most of the lost ground. The battalion's losses were 24 killed, 113 wounded and 203 missing.

The battalion spent the summer of 1918 working on the defences in front of Amiens. Although it received some drafts of recruits from home and reverted to a four-company organisation, it was never made up to full strength. During its spell in the line it was designated a counter-attack battalion, and carried out a number of patrols into No man's land to train the young soldiers. At this period the 1918 flu pandemic caused more casualties than the Germans, with 427 members of the battalion hospitalised at some point in June and July.

==== Chipilly ====
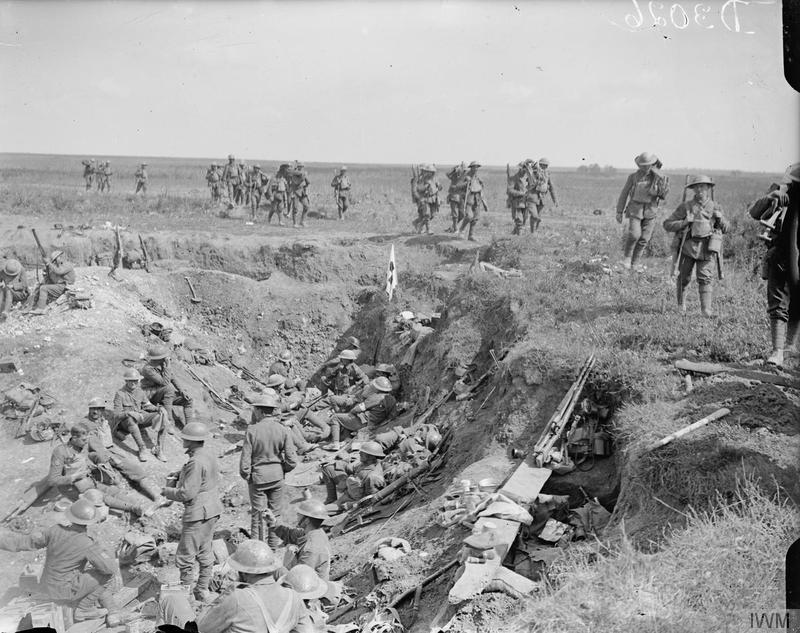
Regimental aid post near Chipilly, 10 August 1918.

For the opening attack of the Hundred Days Offensive (the Battle of Amiens) on 8 August 1918, 174th Bde was given the initial objective of capturing Malard Wood, after which 173rd Bde would pass through to take the vital Chipilly Ridge overlooking a bend in the River Somme and flanking the battlefield. 2/4th Bn led on the left of 173rd Bde's advance in 'artillery formation' through the German barrage that fell behind 174th Bde, during which the battalion HQ staff, including Lt-Col Grover, were wounded by shellfire. In the morning mist the battalion drifted 500 yards left of its intended line through the gullies. At 08.30, as the leading companies reached the far edge of Malard Wood, the mist began to clear and the battalion was brought to a halt by machine gun fire across the valley in front and so dug in at the edge of the wood.

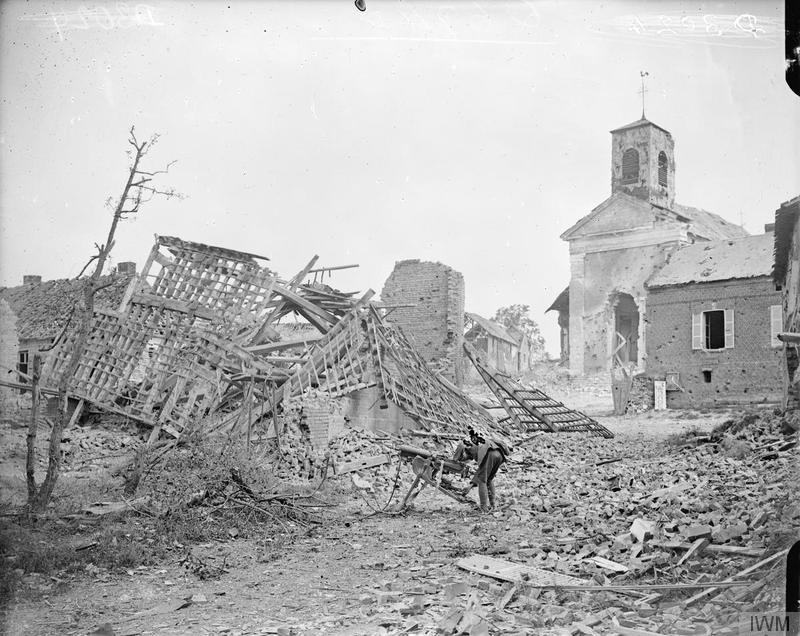
The ruins of Chipilly after its capture

The failure to take Chipilly Ridge resulted in heavy casualties to the troops to the left of 58th Division who were overlooked by this feature. The division therefore made a second attack on 9 August. 2/4th Londons attacked in the centre of 173rd Bde, from an assembly trench that turned out to be no more than a string of shell-holes, and behind a misdirected barrage. The supporting American battalion was not yet in line and the battalion was enfiladed from Chipilly village. Under heavy fire and taking serious casualties, the battalion dug in under the shelter of the Chipilly gully. At nightfall the 2/10th Londons managed to clear Chipilly village and dislodge the defenders from the ridge.

The battalion had lost another 300 men over the two-day battle, and at one point had five acting COs in 12 hours. Between 10 and 22 August the battalion was brought up to strength with a large draft of 20 officers (from various London battalions) and 480 ORss, mainly seasoned soldiers from 14th (Light) Division.

==== Bapaume ====
The Second Battle of Bapaume opened on 22 August and was continued with a night attack on 23/24 August, in which 173rd Bde supported 175th Bde and 47th Division. A dawn attack on 25 August found the German positions empty, and 2/4th Londons was sent forward with a Troop of the Northumberland Hussars and sections of the Royal Field Artillery and Machine Gun Corps as an advanced guard to re-establish contact with the enemy. In these unusual conditions of open warfare, the battalion marched in column up a road until the cavalry contacted the enemy at Billon Wood, when the companies deployed and attacked. Despite intense shelling, the battalion was established on the far side of the wood by the end of the day, and was relieved at midnight.

The attack was renewed on 27 August, with 2/4th Bn in support of 3rd Londons towards Maricourt. The defence was sporadic, and the two battalions passed through and mopped up the village in the morning. The following day's attack consisted of patrol actions against rearguards. The battalion was then rested until 1 September, when at short notice a dawn attack was made towards Bouchavesnes. The battalion followed the creeping barrage, overcame some resistance at the edge of the village, and was on its final objective by 10.45 – an advance of 3000 yards representing the most successful action fought by the 2/4th Bn.

After a period in reserve, the very weak 173rd Bde attacked again on 10 September towards the villages round Épehy. 2/4th Londons were detailed to follow the two leading battalions of 173rd Bde, mopping up behind them and forming a link between the two. Considerable opposition was met from the German Alpine Corps, and the attack lost cohesion in the ruined streets. This unsuccessful probing action was the battalion's last. Despite the successes of the Hundred Days campaign, the BEF's manpower crisis was now severe, and on 12 September 1918 the remnant of the 2/4th Bn was absorbed by the 2/2nd Londons, which fought on with 58th Division until the Armistice in November 1918.

==== Commanding officers ====
The following officers commanded 2/4th Bn during World War I:

- Col Vickers Dunfee, CBE, VD, from formation until the old 2/4th was drafted to the 1/4th Bn
- Acting Lt-Col V.H. Seyd, acting, in Egypt
- Lt-Col W.R.H. Dann, DSO*, (Bedfordshire Regiment), November 1916–June 1918, promoted to command a brigade
- Lt-Col A. Grover, DSO, MC, promoted 8 June, wounded 8 August 1918
- Maj Sutcliffe (2/2nd Londons), acting 8–14 August 1918
- Maj Tollworthy, acting 14–21 August 1918
- Maj W. McC. Crosbie (Royal Munster Fusiliers), from 21 August 1918 to disbandment.

=== 3/4th Battalion ===
The 3/4th Battalion was raised at Hoxton from volunteers as soon as the 2/4th went overseas, and took over its training area at Barnet. Despite the lack of equipment and training it began to send drafts to replace casualties in the 1/4th Bn as early as April 1915. At the end of April the 3rd Battalions of the regiments of the old 1st London Brigade were concentrated at Tadworth as the 3/1st London Brigade.

In June 1915 a reorganisation saw the men of the 3/1st London Brigade who were unfit for overseas service separated out into a composite battalion, the 100th Provisional Battalion, to which the 3/4th Londons supplied two officers and about 100 ORs. The new battalion was stationed at Aldeburgh, guarding the East Coast as part of 6th Provisional Brigade. In August, all the men of the Provisional Battalion were returned to their units except those who had not volunteered for overseas service. The Home Service men continued serving in home defence until 1916, when the Military Service Act swept away the Home/Overseas service distinction and the provisional battalions took on the dual role of home defence and physical conditioning to render men fit for drafting overseas. The 100th Provisional Battalion officially became the 29th (City of London) Bn, London Regiment (TF) on 1 January 1917. The battalion never served overseas, and was demobilised early in 1919.

The 3/1st London Brigade moved to Bury St Edmunds, and was soon recruited back to full strength after the departure of the Provisional Battalion. It absorbed large drafts of recruits under the Derby scheme in February 1916, and in June it moved into camp outside Ipswich. That month the battalion was renumbered to replace the disbanded 2/4th Bn (see above).

=== 4/4th Battalion ===
The 4/4th Battalion was formed in June 1915 to train drafts for the two battalions already serving overseas and the 3/4th Bn preparing to go overseas in 58th Division. It was organised in three companies, A and B for the reception and training of recruits, and C (the 'Expeditionary Company') giving refresher training for wounded men returning to service. A number of former Guardsmen, City of London Police officers, and members of Enfield Rifle Club were appointed as instructors. The battalion took over 3/4th Bn's billets at Barnet in July 1915, with training carried out at Trent Park. When the Derby scheme superseded voluntary enlistment in February 1916, a large number of recruits were assigned directly to bring 3/4th Bn up to strength, but were put through the 4/4th Bn's training process.

In January 1916 the reserve battalions for the whole 1st London Division were concentrated on Salisbury Plain, the 4th going to No 7 Camp, Hurdcott. In February the battalion received a draft of four officers and 50 men from Trinidad for basic training; this party later served with 3/4th Bn Devonshire Regiment in India. On 8 April the unit's title was changed to 4th (Reserve) Bn, London Regiment, forming part of the 1st London Reserve Group. On 1 September 1916 the 4th Reserve Bn was absorbed by the 3rd Reserve Bn, London Rgt. Colonel Vickers Dunfee, who had assumed command of the 4th Reserve Bn on his return from Egypt (see above), was appointed to command 1st Reserve Bn, London Rgt.

=== 29th Londons ===
In June 1915, a reorganisation saw the men of the 3/1st London Brigade (Note: According to the regimental history of the 4th Londons; however, the Army Council Instruction establishing the provisional battalions specified that 100th Provisional Bn was actually composed of men from the 1st, 2nd, 4th and 7th Londons.) who were unfit or unavailable for overseas service separated out into a composite battalion, the 100th Provisional Battalion. This was stationed at Aldeburgh, guarding the East Coast as part of 6th Provisional Brigade. In August, all the men of the Provisional Battalion were returned to their units except those who had not volunteered for overseas service. These Home Service men continued serving in home defence until 1916, when the Military Service Act swept away the Home/Overseas service distinction and the provisional battalions took on the dual role of home defence and physical conditioning to render men fit for drafting overseas. The 100th Provisional Battalion officially became the 29th (City of London) Battalion, London Regiment, on 1 January 1917. The battalion never served overseas, and was demobilised early in 1919.

It is estimated that about 7248 men served in the 4th Londons at some point during the war, and a further 3681 passed through the 29th Londons.

== Interwar ==
The battalion reformed in the renamed Territorial Army on 7 February 1920. The London Regiment having been abolished in 1916, its battalions became independent regiments affiliated to their former Regular regiments. Thus the 4th Londons reformed as 4th City of London Regiment (Royal Fusiliers), once again in 1st London Brigade.

In the coal strike of April 1921 a Defence Force was formed, with one unit being raised at the 4th Londons' HQ, joined by some members of the regiment. This lasted for three months during the political crisis.

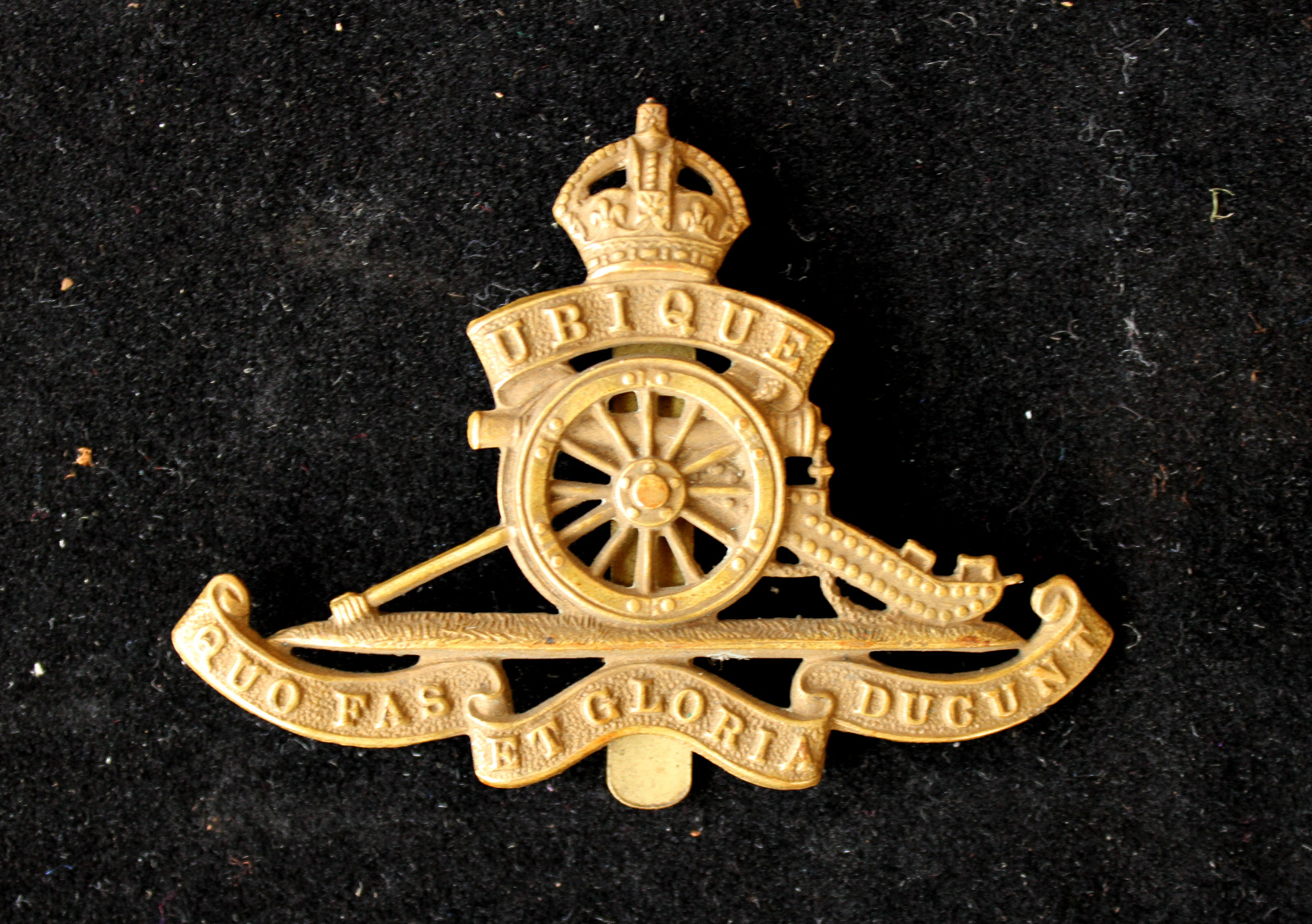
RA cap badge adopted by the 4th Londons in 1935

In 1935 the increasing need for anti-aircraft (AA) defence, particularly for London, was addressed by converting the 47th (2nd London) Division into the 1st Anti-Aircraft Division. A number of London battalions were also converted to the AA role, the 4th Londons being transferred to the Royal Artillery (RA) as an AA artillery unit on 15 December 1935, the 60th (City of London) AA Brigade, RA (TA), with HQ and 168th, 169th, and later 194th AA Batteries relocated to Artillery House, Bromley Road, Catford, in South East London. The unit formed part of 27th (Home Counties) Anti-Aircraft Group in 1st AA Division. Unlike some of the other the units converted to the AA role, the 4th Londons lost their cap badge and adopted the RA badge.

In 1939 the RA adopted the designation 'regiment' in place of 'brigade', and the AA formations became 'brigades' rather than 'groups', thus 60th (City of London) AA Regiment formed part of 27th (Home Counties) AA Brigade.

== World War II ==
=== Mobilisation ===
The TA's AA units were mobilised on 23 September 1938 during the Munich Crisis, with units manning their emergency positions within 24 hours, even though many did not yet have their full complement of men or equipment. The emergency lasted three weeks, and they were stood down on 13 October. In February 1939 the existing AA defences came under the control of a new Anti-Aircraft Command. In June a partial mobilisation of TA units was begun in a process known as 'couverture', whereby each AA unit did a month's tour of duty in rotation to man selected AA and searchlight positions. On 24 August, ahead of the declaration of war, AA Command was fully mobilised at its war stations. 60th AA Regiment mobilised at Bromley (168th, 169th and 194th HAA Btys) with a mixture of old 3-inch and newer 3.7-inch guns, and was transferred to a new 48 AA Bde formed within 1 AA Division.

=== Battle of France ===
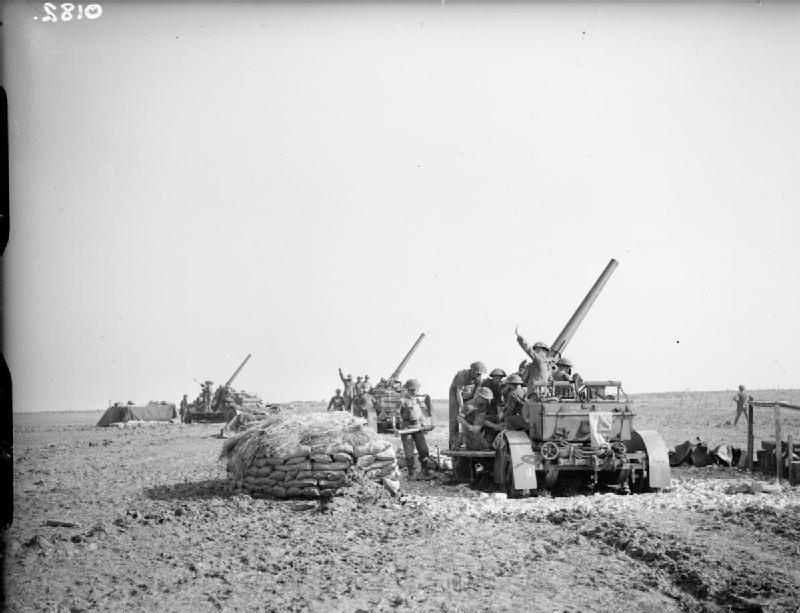
3-inch AA guns on cruciform travelling carriages

On 10 October 1939 the regiment moved to France with 24 x 3-inch guns to join the British Expeditionary Force (BEF) and deployed to Beauval as part of Brig E.W. Chadwick's 2nd AA Bde. When the Battle of France began in May 1940 the regiment was responsible for defending six airfields of the Air Component of the BEF around Abbeville.

However, the BEF was soon in retreat, and its AA units were swept up in the confusion. 60th HAA Regiment fought first at Villers-Bretonneux and then between Béthune and Seclin, where 169th Bty was attacked by tanks and aircraft and eventually had to destroy its guns. 168th Battery went to Béthune then to St Omer and 194th to Merville. On 21 May 60th HAA Rgt was ordered to defend Merville. It had by then 8 x 3-inch, 4 x 40mm, a troop of AA Light machine guns and two Troops of 5th Searchlight Bty. By 25 May the regiment was in constant action at Dunkirk:

'Orders received to take up positions around Dunkirk beach to protect the evacuation of the BEF, intense enemy air activity. 194th Battery in action at Uxem, heavy palls of smoke over the whole area made observation difficult. Gunner Walker killed in attack on No 1 gun.' (War Diary 60th HAA Rgt).

2nd AA Brigade took over the AA defence of the Dunkirk area during the evacuation, deploying 60th HAA Rgt at Bergues in the southern sector with additional responsibility for anti-tank defence of the Dunkirk-Bergues Canal. As the 'pocket' shrank, the AA units destroyed their guns and joined the queues waiting to embark in the small ships of Operation Dynamo.

=== The Blitz ===
AA units returning from France were rapidly reinforced, re-equipped where possible, and redeployed for future integration into existing defence plans. 60th HAA Regiment went to Aberystwyth where it re-equipped with 3-inch guns. In the summer of 1940, along with other AA units equipped with 3-inch or 3.7-inch AA guns, the 60th was designated a Heavy AA Regiment.

After re-equipment, the regiment joined 34th (South Midland) AA Bde in a new 11th AA Division. 34 AA Brigade's role was to cover Birmingham and Coventry, which were heavily attacked during The Blitz, which lasted until May 1941.

As a mobile unit, 60th HAA Rgt had an attached Signal Section (Royal Corps of Signals), Workshop (Royal Army Ordnance Corps) and Transport (Royal Army Service Corps), but while the regiment remained on home defence these sections were transferred to 89th (Cinque Ports) HAA Rgt which embarked for Egypt on 15 December 1940. By the end of the Blitz 194th HAA Bty had also left the regiment, joining the War Office (WO) Reserve as an independent battery for service in the field, and was replaced in June 1941 by 206th (Erith) HAA Bty from 58th (Kent) HAA Rgt. (194th HAA Battery later joined 80th (Berkshire) HAA Rgt and served with it in Operation Torch.) By September, 60th HAA Rgt had moved to 42nd AA Bde in 12th AA Division covering the Firth of Clyde in Scotland, and had been joined by 359th HAA Bty from 113th HAA Rgt.

By the Spring of 1942 the regiment was still in 42nd AA Bde, but 359th HAA Bty was attached to 63 AA Bde in Western Scotland. Later, 359th HAA Bty left the regiment completely, and by the summer of 1942 was deployed in the Falkland Islands.

=== Mobile unit ===
In May 1942, 60th HAA Rgt briefly joined 57th AA Bde in 7th AA Division in North East England, but before the end of June had left again, as an unbrigaded regiment in AA Command. By early 1943 it had become a mobile unit once more as part of the field force under WO control with the following composition:

- RHQ 60 HAA Rgt
- 168 HAA Bty
- 169 HAA Bty
- 206 HAA Bty
- 60 HAA Rgt Workshop, Royal Electrical and Mechanical Engineers (REME)

=== Normandy ===
The regiment was assigned to Second Army for the Allied invasion of Normandy (Operation Overlord). It formed part of 106th AA Bde, scheduled to land shortly after D-Day to defend the airfields that would be established for RAF Second Tactical Air Force.

The brigade began landing on 10 June (D + 4), although the regiment at first only had two of its batteries, the third battery not arriving until after 25 June. The deployment was frustrating, because Luftwaffe attacks were lighter than anticipated and there were surplus HAA guns in the beachhead. In addition, RAF commanders refused permission to engage enemy aircraft unless the airfields themselves were being attacked.

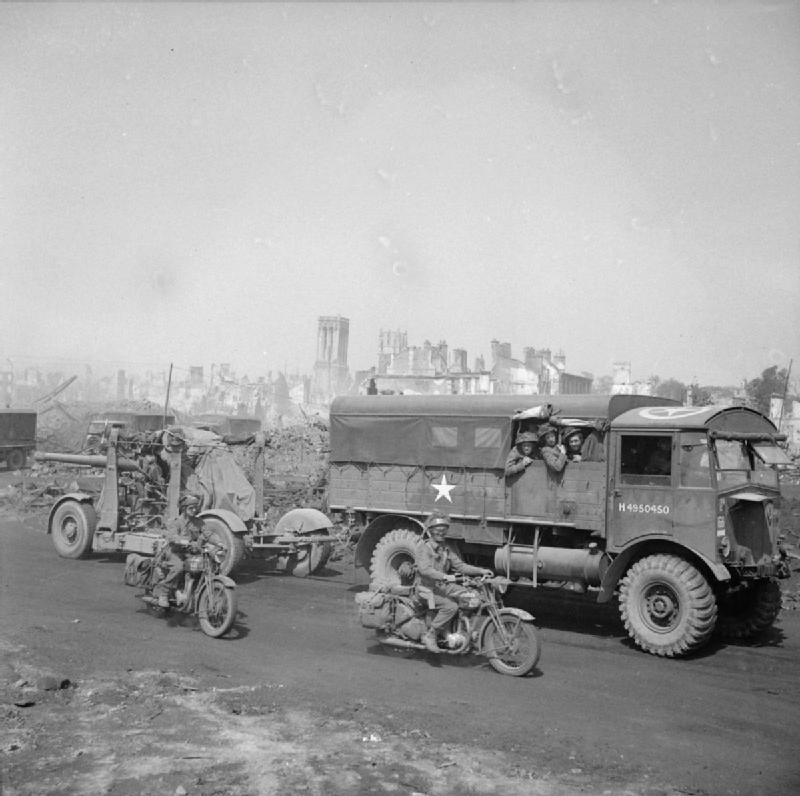
An AEC Matador tractor tows a 3.7-inch AA gun through the ruins of Caen. August 1944

Airfield defence having become redundant, the HAA guns began to be used for a variety of ground tasks, such as bombardment, counter-battery fire, and anti-tank shoots. 60th HAA Regiment was engaged in this way during the Battle of Caen, and then in AA defence of the city (under 100th AA Bde) after its capture.

=== North West Europe ===
After the Allied breakout from the Normandy beachhead, 60th HAA Rgt joined 74th AA Bde in guarding the crossings of the Seine and then moved to Boulogne on 12 September. Here it was assigned to II Canadian Corps to act as medium artillery for the attack on the German garrison of the port, which held out for eight days. The 3.7-inch gins of 60th and 2nd Canadian HAA Rgts took part in prolonged shoots, including a high proportion of airburst shots. Both regiments reported that oil squirted out of the guns' buffer and recuperator casings, while the barrels got so hot that they showed a visible droop. All 24 of 60th's guns were affected. (Later it became common practice to have fire missions for HAA guns timed so that there were intervals for cooling.)

In early November the brigade relieved 100th AA Bde defending the Waal bridges at Nijmegen that had been captured during Operation Market Garden. Although AA defence had priority, each HAA regiment had a battery on call for defensive fire and counter-battery fire missions in support of the Allied bridgehead. 60th HAA Regiment reported that by now it had fired 25,000 rounds in ground fire tasks since its arrival in Normandy. Its variety of targets was now enlarged to include V-1 flying bombs passing overhead towards Antwerp.

Bad weather set in during December, with widespread flooding, and 168 Bty had to be rescued by river barge. There was little activity by the Luftwaffe, but on 17 December it carried out strikes all along the Allied front, with Focke-Wulf Fw 190s and Messerschmitt Bf 109s attacking the Waal bridges and artillery positions at low level. On 1 January 1945, the Luftwaffe launched Operation Bodenplatte: daylight attacks by single-engined fighters against Allied airfields and lines of communication in support of the Ardennes offensive. 74th AA Brigade reported groups of 25 to 30 enemy fighters crossing its area in flights of four flying low, while small formations of Messerschmitt Me 262s crossed at high level. There were 15 separate HAA engagements by the brigade's guns.

For operations in the Reichswald in February 1945 (Operation Veritable), 74th AA Bde was assigned to II Canadian Corps. After carrying out preliminary bombardments, 60th HAA Rgt reverted to AA defence. The units of 74th AA Bde continued to protect the vital routes over the Waal and Maas during the build-up to the Rhine crossing (Operation Plunder). As the war drew to a close, 60th HA Rgt remained in 74th AA Bde under the command of First Canadian Army.

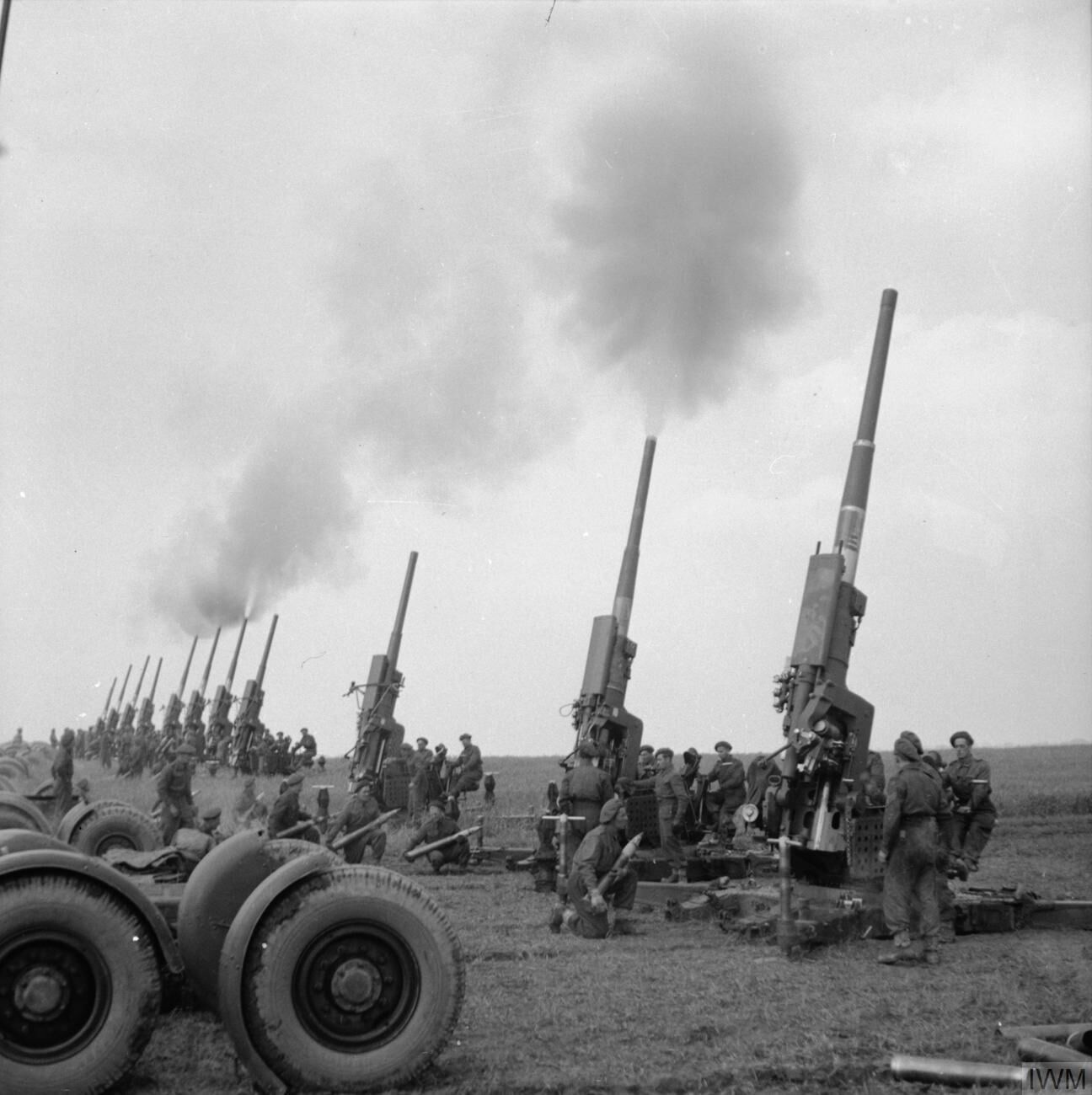
3.7-inch guns of 60th (City of London) Heavy Anti-Aircraft Regiment fire a salvo to celebrate the Allied victory in Europe, 6 May 1945.

The regiment had the honour of being selected to fire a salute of its 3.7-inch guns at 21st Army Group HQ on 6 May 1945 to celebrate Victory in Europe. The regiment with 168, 169 and 205 HAA Btys was placed in suspended animation in British Army of the Rhine on 3 April 1946.

== Postwar ==
The regiment was reformed in the reconstituted TA on 1 January 1947 as 460 HAA Regiment, RA (City of London) with its HQ at Catford. It formed part of a short-lived 75 AA Bde (the former 49 AA Bde) at Grove Park, Lewisham. When AA Command was disbanded in 1955 there was a considerable reduction in the number of AA units, and 460 HAA was merged into 265 (8th London) HAA Regiment as R Battery (4th City of London). In 1961 a further round of amalgamations saw the whole of 265 HAA Regiment reduced to Q (London) Battery in a new 265 Regiment, and the 4th Londons' lineage ended.

== Heritage & ceremonial ==
=== Traditions ===
The 4th Londons claimed descent from the London or Tower Hamlets Trained Bands, but there was no connection: the descendants of the Trained Bands were the Royal London Militia (7th Bn Royal Fusiliers) rather than the Volunteers.

During World War I, whenever 1/4th Londons were out of the line, the drums Beat Retreat and the battalion mounted a Regimental Quarter Guard daily. The 3/4th (later 2/4th) Bn acquired a Pipe band, originally formed to aid recruitment, and then transferred to the battalion when the Derby scheme ended voluntary enlistment. The pipers wore Royal Stewart tartan and Glengarry caps. The battalion believed that it was unique for an English unit with no Scottish or Irish affiliation to possess such a band.

=== Uniforms & insignia ===
The uniform of the THRVB from 1868 was 'Volunteer' grey with red and blue braiding, and the headgear was described as 'a demi-shako, with "Cheesecutter" peak'. The regimental badge showed the White Tower of the Tower of London. On 14 November 1874 the uniform was changed to scarlet with blue facings, and in July 1894 the Glengarry undress cap was replaced by the Field service cap.

When the battalion transferred to the London Regiment it retained the Royal Fusiliers' badge with the addition of a scroll underneath bearing the battalion's new title.

In April 1917 1/4th Londons wore a circular red recognition patch on each shoulder and painted on each side of the helmet. After Passchendaele, the other ranks of the 2/4th Bn were given permission to wear a small version of the Fusiliers' 'grenade' badge on the corners of their tunic collar.

After World War II, the officers, warrant officers and senior NCOs (later officers only) of 460 HAA Rgt wore a red and blue twisted cord Lanyard in place of the RA white lanyard.

=== Honorary Colonels ===
The following officers served as Honorary Colonel of the unit and its predecessors:

- Sir Henry de Hoghton, 9th Bt, appointed (to 4th Tower Hamlets RVC) 21 December 1864.
- R. Richardson Gardner appointed (to 6th Tower Hamlets RVC) 6 May 1865.
- Walter Mellor, appointed (to 1st THRVB) 20 February 1867, died June 1886.
- Lt-Gen G.H. Moncrieff (formerly commanding Scots Guards and East London Volunteer Brigade), appointed 24 July 1886.
- Lord Marshall of Chipstead, Lord Mayor of London 1918–19, appointed 16 October 1918, died 29 March 1936.
- Lt-Col Sir Leslie Burnett, 2nd Bt, former CO, appointed 16 September 1936, until 1951.

=== Memorials ===
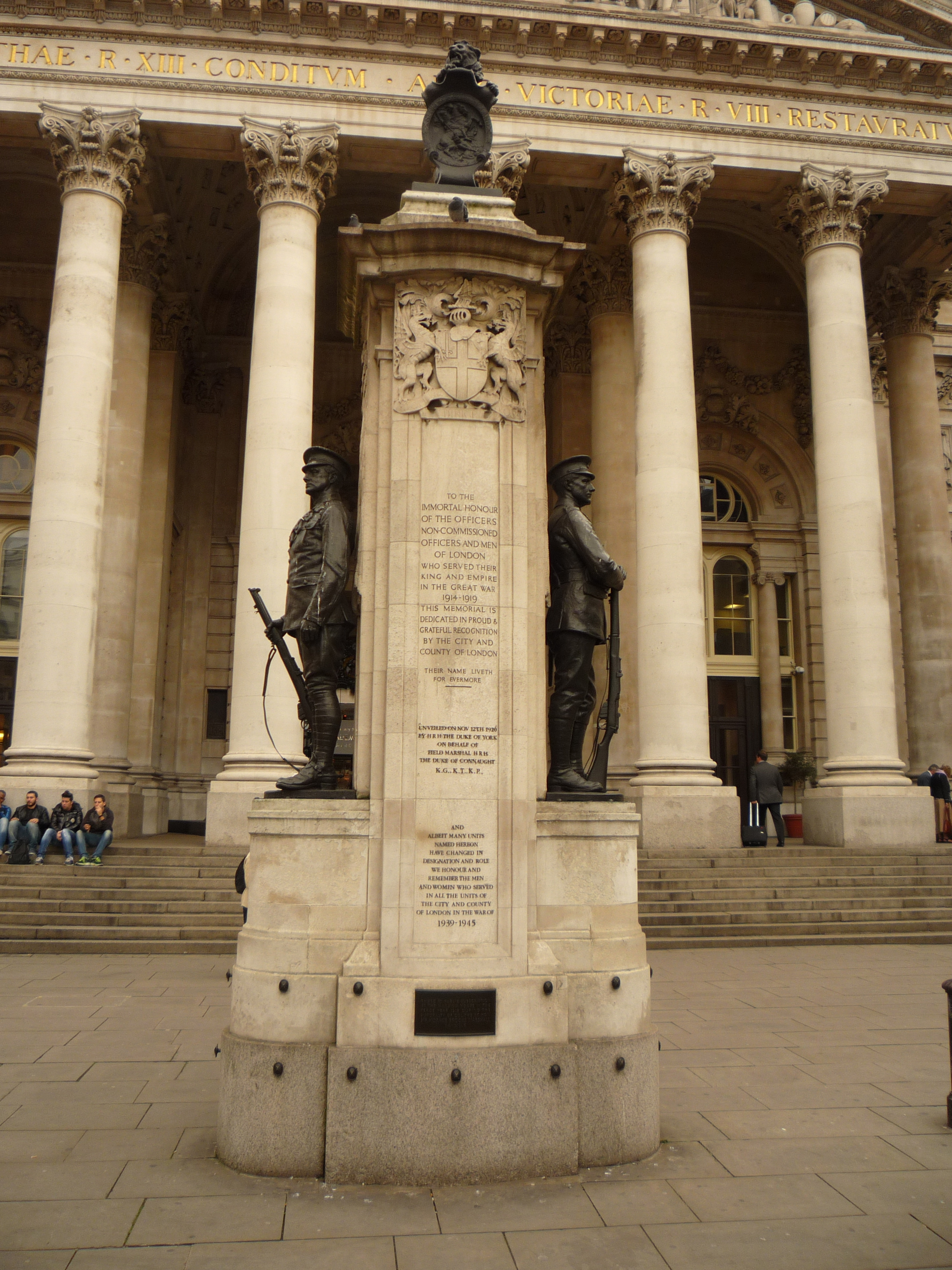
London Troops Memorial at the Royal Exchange

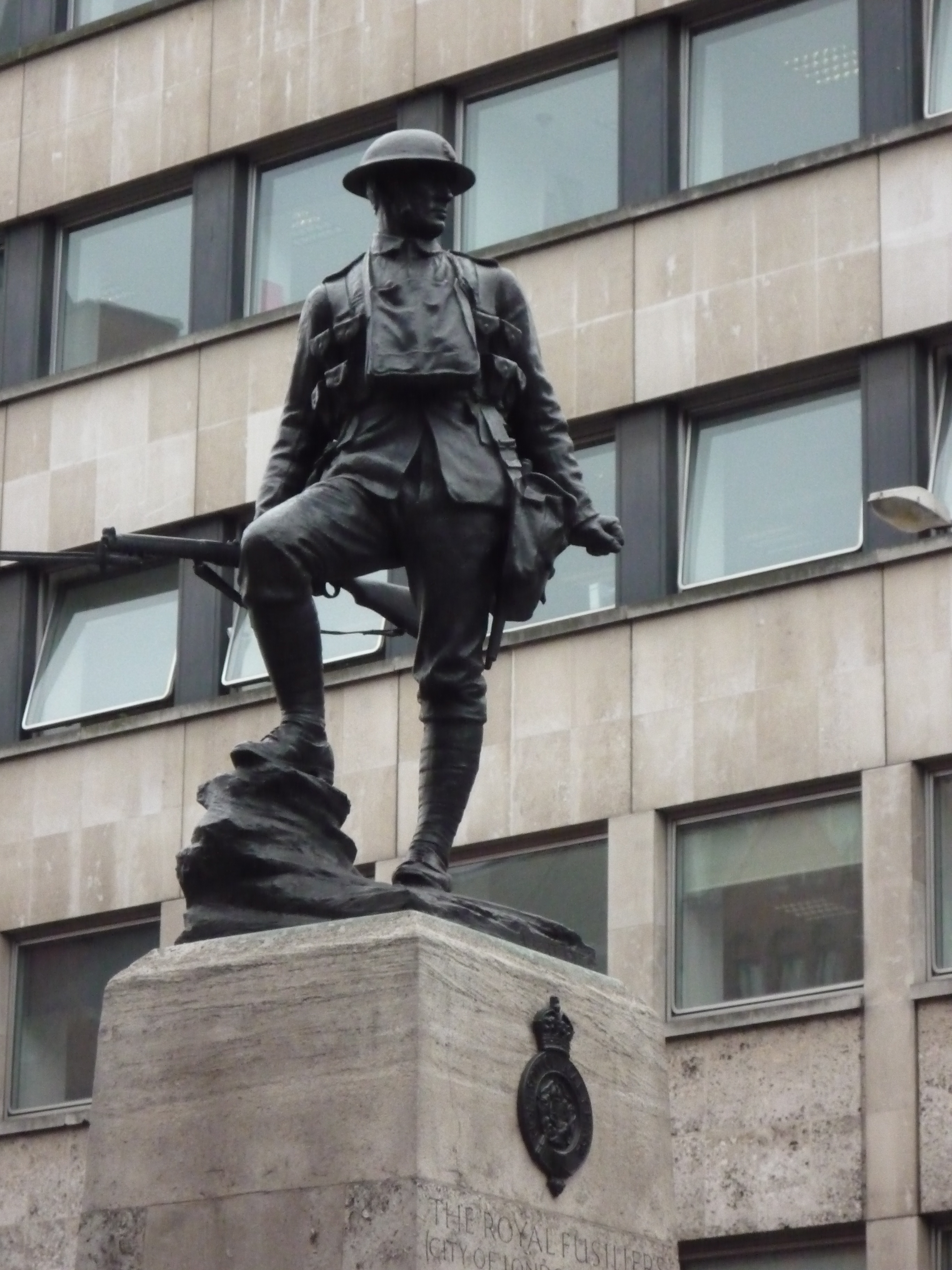
Royal Fusiliers Memorial Holborn Bar

The 4th London Battalion is listed on the City and County of London Troops Memorial in front of the Royal Exchange, with architectural design by Sir Aston Webb and sculpture by Alfred Drury. The right-hand (southern) bronze figure flanking this memorial depicts an infantryman representative of the various London infantry units.

The battalion is also listed on the pedestal of the Royal Fusiliers War Memorial at Holborn Bar, which is surmounted by a bronze figure of a Fusilier sculpted by Albert Toft, whilst its World War One casualties are listed by name in the roll of honour at the Royal Fusiliers Chapel in St Sepulchre-without-Newgate. The Regimental colour presented in 1909 is also laid up at St Sepulchre's. King's colours were presented to the war-formed TF battalions in 1921: that of the 2/4th is laid up in the Officers' Mess at the Army Reserve Centre, Balham High Road, while that of the 3/4th is in the Fusiliers Museum at the Tower of London.

The 58th Divisional Memorial, depicting a wounded horse sculpted by Henri Gauquie, is at Chipilly. It was paid for from the profits of the divisional entertainment canteen and barber shop, the remainder funding a TA charity that still exists today.

=== Battle Honours ===
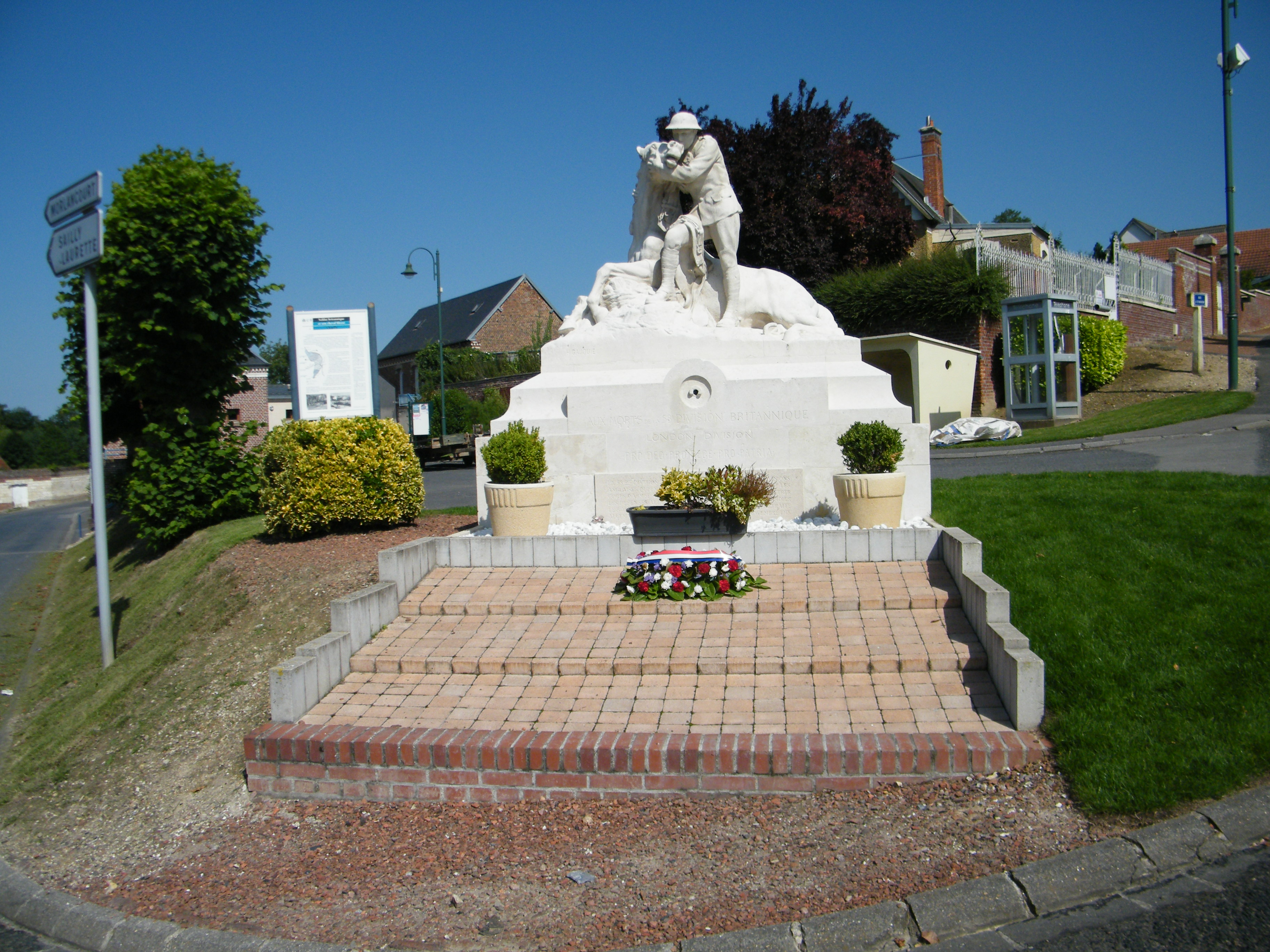
58th Division's monument at Chipilly

The 4th London Regiment was awarded the following Battle honours: South Africa, 1900

Neuve Chapelle, Ypres, 1915, '17, St Julien, Aubers, Festubert, 1915, Somme, 1916, '18, Albert, 1916, '18, Guillemont, Ginchy, Flers-Courcelette, Morval, Le Transloy, Arras, 1917, '18, Scarpe, 1917, '18, Bullecourt, Langemarck, 1917, Menin Road, Polygon Wood, Passchendaele, Cambrai, 1917, '18, St Quentin, Villers Bretonneux, Amiens, Bapaume, 1918, Hindenburg Line, Canal du Nord, Valenciennes, Sambre, France and Flanders 1915–18, Gallipoli 1915–16, Egypt, 1916.

The honours in bold are those chosen to appear on the Regimental colours. The Royal Artillery does not receive battle honours, so none were awarded to 60th HAA Regiment for World War II.

== Sources ==
- Anon, 'The History of the Old 2/4th (City of London) Battalion The London Regiment, Royal Fusiliers' London: Westminster Press, 1919/Uckfield: Naval & Military Press, 2002.
- Anon, Regimental Badges and Service Caps, London: George Philip & Sons, 1941.
- Army List (various dates).
- Maj R. Money Barnes, The Soldiers of London, London: Seeley Service, 1963.
- Maj A.F. Becke,History of the Great War: Order of Battle of Divisions, Part 2a: The Territorial Force Mounted Divisions and the 1st-Line Territorial Force Divisions (42–56), London: HM Stationery Office, 1935/Uckfield: Naval & Military Press, 2007, ISBN 1-847347-39-8.
- Maj A.F. Becke,History of the Great War: Order of Battle of Divisions, Part 2b: The 2nd-Line Territorial Force Divisions (57th–69th), with the Home-Service Divisions (71st–73rd) and 74th and 75th Divisions, London: HM Stationery Office, 1937/Uckfield: Naval & Military Press, 2007, ISBN 1-847347-39-8.
- Ian F.W. Beckett, Riflemen Form: A study of the Rifle Volunteer Movement 1859–1908, Aldershot: Ogilby Trusts, 1982, ISBN 0 85936 271 X.
- Gregory Blaxland, Amiens: 1918, London: Frederick Muller, 1968/Star, 1981, ISBN 0-352-30833-8.
- Burke's Peerage and Baronetage (various dates).
- Bryan Cooper, The Ironclads of Cambrai, London: Souvenir Press, 1967/Pan Books, 1970, ISBN 0-330-02579-1.
- Brig-Gen Sir James E. Edmonds, History of the Great War: Military Operations, France and Belgium, 1916, Vol I, London: Macmillan,1932/Woking: Shearer, 1986, ISBN 0-946998-02-7.
- Major L.F. Ellis, History of the Second World War, United Kingdom Military Series: The War in France and Flanders 1939–1940, London: HM Stationery Office, 1954/Uckfield, Naval & Military Press, 2004.
- Major L.F. Ellis, History of the Second World War, United Kingdom Military Series: Victory in the West, Vol I: The Battle of Normandy, London: HM Stationery Office, 1962/Uckfield: Naval & Military, 2004, ISBN 1-845740-58-0.
- Gen Sir Martin Farndale, History of the Royal Regiment of Artillery: The Years of Defeat: Europe and North Africa, 1939–1941, Woolwich: Royal Artillery Institution, 1988/London: Brasseys, 1996, ISBN 1-85753-080-2.
- J.B.M. Frederick, Lineage Book of British Land Forces 1660–1978, Vol I, Wakefield, Microform Academic, 1984, ISBN 1-85117-007-3.
- J.B.M. Frederick, Lineage Book of British Land Forces 1660–1978, Vol II, Wakefield, Microform Academic, 1984, ISBN 1-85117-009-X.
- Maj W.E. Grey, 2nd City of London Regiment (Royal Fusiliers) in the Great War 1914–19, Westminster: Regimental Headquarters, 1929/Uckfield: Naval & Military Press, 2002, ISBN 978-1-843423-69-0
- Capt F. Clive Grimwade, The War History of the 4th Battalion The London Regiment (Royal Fusiliers) 1914–1919, London: Regimental Headquarters, 1922/Uckfield, Naval & Military press, 2002, ISBN 978-1-843423-63-8.
- Joslen, H. F. (2003) [1960]. Orders of Battle: Second World War, 1939–1945. Uckfield, East Sussex: Naval and Military Press. ISBN 978-1-84342-474-1.
- Norman E.H. Litchfield, The Territorial Artillery 1908–1988 (Their Lineage, Uniforms and Badges), Nottingham: Sherwood Press, 1992, ISBN 0-9508205-2-0.
- Alan MacDonald, Pro Patria Mori: The 56th (1st London) Division at Gommecourt, 1st July 1916, 2nd Edn, West Wickham: Iona Books, 2008, ISBN 978-0-9558119-1-3.
- David Martin, Londoners on the Western Front: The 58th (2/1st London) Division in the Great War, Barnsley: Pen & Sword Books, 2014, ISBN 978-1-78159-180-2.
- Lt-Col H.R. Martin, Historical Record of the London Regiment, 2nd Edn (nd).
- Alan H. Maude (ed.), The History of the 47th (London) Division 1914–1919, London: Amalgamated Press, 1922/Uckfield: Naval & Military Press, 2002, ISBN 1-84342-205-0.
- Martin Middlebrook, The First Day on the Somme, 1 July 1916, London: Allen Lane 1971/Fontana, 1975, ISBN 0-00-633626-4.
- H.C. O’Neill, The Royal Fusiliers in the Great War, London: Heinemann, 1922.
- F.W. Perry, History of the Great War: Order of Battle of Divisions, Part 5b: Indian Army Divisions, Newport: Ray Westlake, 1993, ISBN 1-871167-23-X.
- Brig N.W. Routledge, History of the Royal Regiment of Artillery: Anti-Aircraft Artillery 1914–55, London: Royal Artillery Institution/Brassey's, 1994, ISBN 1-85753-099-3.
- Maj C.H. Dudley Ward, The Fifty Sixth Division, 1st London Territorial Division, 1914–1918, London: John Murray, 1921/Uckfield: Naval & Military Press, 2001, ISBN 978-1-843421-11-5.
- War Office, Army Council Instructions Issued During January 1916, London: HM Stationery Office, 1916.
- War Office, Army Council Instructions Issued During December 1916, London: HM Stationery Office, 1916.
- Ray Westlake, British Regiments at Gallipoli, Barnsley: Leo Cooper, 1996, ISBN 0-85052-511-X.
- Ray Westlake, Tracing the Rifle Volunteers, Barnsley: Pen and Sword, 2010, ISBN 978 1 84884 211 3.

=== Online sources ===
- British Army units from 1945 on
- British Military History
- The Long, Long Trail
- Orders of Battle at Patriot Files Archived 12 June 2018 at the Wayback Machine
- David Porter's work on Provisional Brigades at Great War Forum
- The Regimental Warpath 1914–1918 (archive site)
- Land Forces of Britain, the Empire and Commonwealth (Regiments.org – archive site)
- Royal Artillery 1939–1945
- Royal Artillery Units Netherlands 1944–45
- Stepping Forward: A Tribute to the Volunteer Military Reservists and Supporting Auxiliaries of Greater London
