= 113th Heavy Anti-Aircraft Regiment, Royal Artillery =

113th Heavy Anti-Aircraft Regiment, RA
- Royal Artillery cap badge
- Active: 25 November 1940 – 16 June 1945
- Country: United Kingdom
- Branch: British Army
- Role: Air defence Medium artillery Coastal defence
- Size: Regiment
- Part of: 76th AA Brigade
- Engagements: The Blitz; D-Day; Normandy campaign Battle of the Scheldt

The 113th Heavy Anti-Aircraft Regiment (113th HAA Rgt) was an air defence unit of the British Army's Royal Artillery during World War II. It saw action during The Blitz, landed in Normandy on D-Day and served throughout the subsequent campaign in North West Europe, operating as medium artillery in the Battle of the Scheldt, Unusually, its AA guns were successfully used to destroy enemy submarines in the closing stages of the war.

== Origin ==
113th Heavy AA Regiment was raised as part of the rapid expansion of Anti-Aircraft Command in late 1940. Regimental Headquarters (RHQ) was formed on 25 November 1940 at No 3 AA Practice Camp at Tŷ Croes on Anglesey to take command of 359, 362 and 366 HAA Batteries, which had been raised on 21 September 1940. On 10 December, RHQ moved to Nottingham, where it came under the operational control of 50th AA Brigade in 2nd AA Division. As the batteries arrived they occupied gun sites around Nottingham. Lieutenant-Colonel E.A. Goodwin was appointed commanding officer (CO) on 17 December. The newly formed 391 HAA Bty joined the regiment from No 2 AA Practice Camp at Burrow Head and took over sites round Derby in February. This battery had been formed at 211th HAA Training Rgt at Oswestry on 14 November 1940 based on a cadre supplied by 78th (1st East Anglian) HAA Regiment.

== The Blitz ==
The regiment's gun sites were initially split between 50th AA Bde protecting Nottingham and Derby, and 32nd (Midland) AA Bde guarding the East Midlands of England. When a new 66th AA Bde was formed in 2nd AA Division at Derby, 113th HAA Rgt transferred to it on 4 March 1941.

The North and East Midlands had escaped the worst of the bombing during the early part of The Blitz, but Nottingham and Derby were heavily attacked on the night of 8/9 May 1941 (the Nottingham Blitz).

The regiment sent a cadre of experienced officers and men to 206th Training Regiment at Arborfield for a new 439 Bty; this was formed on 12 June 1941 and joined the regiment on 4 September 1941, replacing 359 Bty, which transferred to 60th (City of London) HAA Rgt, and later became an independent battery in the Falkland Islands garrison. Other cadres from the regiment formed: On 7 August the regiment sent another cadre of experienced officers to 206th HAA Training Rgt to form a new 469 (Mixed) HAA Bty composed largely of women members of the Auxiliary Territorial Service. This joined 132nd (Mixed) HAA Rgt.

The regiment supplied further cadres as follows:

- 512 HAA Bty formed on 19 January 1942 at 206th HAA Training Rgt, Arborfield, which joined 149th HAA Rgt
- 545 HAA Bty formed on 12 March 1942 at 207th HAA Training Rgt, Oswestry, but this battery was cancelled
- 557th HAA Bty formed on 3 June 1942 at 205th HAA Training Rgt at Arborfield, which joined 168th HAA Rgt
- 559th HAA Bty formed on 30 April 1942 at 205th HAA Training Rgt at Arborfield, but this battery was also cancelled

== Mid-war ==
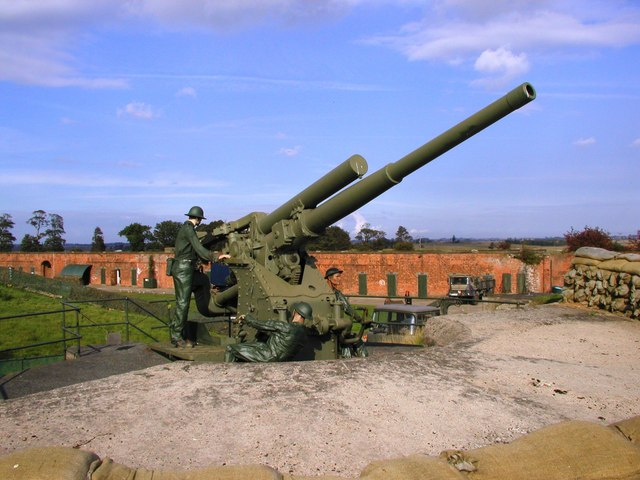
3.7-inch HAA gun preserved at Fort Paull (Photo: Andy Beecroft).

The Derby–Nottingham Gun Defence Area (GDA) saw a renewal of occasional night attacks in the autumn of 1941, with all the regiment's sites engaged on 22 October.

In February 1942, the regiment transferred to the Hull GDA under 39th AA Bde in 10th AA Division. Here the responsibility was to protect industry along the Humber Estuary. Hull city centre and its docks had been badly bombed in 1941 (the Hull Blitz) and continued to be regularly attacked. RHQ was established at Wawne Hall, near Hull, later moving to Paull (gun site H7) and the batteries took over gun sites along the Humber, with 362 Bty at Scunthorpe. The regiment's guns were in action before the end of the month, and regularly engaged hostile aircraft at night. On the night of 20 May, one of its gun sites was bombed, suffering 11 casualties, two of them fatal.

On 18 May, Major F.R. Gilbert, TD (a pre-war Territorial Army officer with 53rd (City of London) HAA Rgt), was promoted from 439 Bty to command the regiment as Lt-Col, after which 439 Bty left the regiment and became an independent unit under War Office control. It briefly rejoined the regiment from June to October, then reverted to independent status.

In May the regiment was due to move to Southern England, but in fact it remained in Hull until August, though its batteries began to move around regularly, manning sites at York, Leeds and Yeadon, West Yorkshire. In August, the regiment moved to the Scottish Highlands under 51st AA Bde in 6th AA Group. RHQ was established at Poolewe, and there were gun sites at Kyle of Lochalsh, Oban, Fort William and Balmacara. 362 Battery was detached to the London Inner Artillery Zone in October, manning sites at Walthamstow and Barnes, and then at Bedfont and Yeading in Middlesex, where it saw action against night intruders.

== Mobile training ==
On 22 November 1942, 113th HAA Rgt was ordered to begin the process of mobilisation to become part of the field force. By the end of the year the batteries were dispersed around the country: 362 Bty to Pembroke, and then to No 2 HAA Practice Camp, Burrow Head; 366 Bty to the Clyde GDA, and 391 Bty with RHQ at Aberdeen. In late January 1943 the regiment assembled at Haltwhistle for a month's battle training, and then went to 11 AA Bde Tactical School at Leigh-on-Sea for mobile training. The batteries then dispersed again to assist 3rd AA Group: 362 Bty to Bristol, 366 Bty to Newport, Wales and Gloucester, and 391 Bty to Predannack.

On 1 May, 113th HAA Rgt was withdrawn from AA Command and came under Home Forces, ordered to mobilise for overseas service. It concentrated at Oulton Park Camp, Tarporley, in Cheshire. At first it formed part of 73rd AA Bde, but on 1 June 1943 it came under the command of the newly formed 76th AA Bde HQ at nearby Peover Hall at Knutsford, which was training for the planned invasion of Normandy (Operation Overlord).

Mobile HAA regiments had an establishment of three batteries each of two troops, with a total of 24 towed 3.7-inch guns. They also had their own Royal Electrical and Mechanical Engineers (REME) workshops, and 113 HAA Workshop was formed at New Holland, Lincolnshire, in April 1943. It was formally mobilised for overseas service the following month and joined the regiment at Tarporley in July. Similarly, 113 HAA Rgt Signal Section, Royal Corps of Signals, joined during the summer. By January 1944, 76th AA Bde had been joined by the lorries of 323 Company Royal Army Service Corps (RASC) to provide mobility, and 1652 HAA Rgt Platoon was assigned to 113th HAA Rgt.

Intensive training continued: in June 1943 the regiment attended the Home Forces Sea Target Practice Camp at Ramsgate, next went to Redesdale Practice Camp for ground shooting on the Otterburn Ranges, and then to 1st AA Practice Camp at Aberporth, while the REME Workshop underwent battle training. In the autumn the regiment took part in beach landing exercises at Poole. At the beginning of 1944 the regiment moved its base to Southend-on-Sea, while parties again visited Otterburn and Clacton-on-Sea for firing practice, and took part in beach exercises at Inverary and Hayling Island.

== D-Day ==
In the second half of May 1944 the regiment concentrated at Ipswich and then on 1 June the reconnaissance groups embarked on Landing Craft, Tank (LCTs) at Southampton while the main body were loaded onto Landing Ships, Tank (LSTs) at Felixstowe.

76th AA Brigade was to provide the AA support for 50th (Northumbrian) Infantry Division, landing on Gold Beach. 113th HAA Regiment was assigned to the AA Assault Group scheduled to land on D-Day itself, on Jig and King sectors. Regimental HQ of 113th HAA Rgt was to control the AA Assault Group, with Lt-Col Gilbert acting as AA Defence Commander (AADC) under 104 Beach Sub Area. Assault units landed with minimum scales of equipment, to be brought up to strength by parties landing later. Light AA (LAA) defence was emphasised at the start of the operation, since low-level attack by Luftwaffe aircraft was considered the most likely threat, so the HAA guns would only begin to land on the second tide:

AA Assault Group

- RHQ 113th HAA Rgt (Lt-Col F.R. Gilbert)
  - 320 Bty, 93rd LAA Rgt (20 mm Polsten guns)
- RHQ 120th LAA Rgt
  - 394 and 395 Btys, 120th LAA Rgt (Bofors 40 mm guns)
- One Trp 356 (Independent) Searchlight Bty
- 152 AA Operations Room

In the event, there were delays in landing, so 120th LAA Rgt acted as infantry, clearing enemy positions while awaiting the arrival of their guns. 76th AA Bde planned to have put three HAA troops (12 x 3.7-inch guns) ashore by nightfall on D-Day, but in practice, this proved too ambitious. RHQ of 113th HAA Rgt landed at Le Hamel at 15.00 on the second tide and set up the tactical HQ, but none of its own guns appeared. At midnight, Gilbert (as AADC) reported that on King Beach he had eight guns of 394/120 LAA Bty (one Bofors having been lost when its LCT hit a mine) and six triple 20mm mountings of 320/93 LAA Bty, while on Jig Beach there were nine 40mm and two triple 20 mm.

Landings continued the next day (D+1) and by nightfall 113th HAA Rgt had 20 guns ashore (the other four having been damaged in landing), which engaged an air raid that night, two aircraft being destroyed. Once the AA defences of Gold Beach were in place, 76th AA Bde's main task became the protection of the artificial Mulberry harbour being assembled nearby at Arromanches-les-Bains. RHQ of 113th HAA was positioned at Meuvaines.

== Normandy ==
As the campaign progressed 113th HAA Rgt had almost nightly engagements against small formations of enemy aircraft. In addition, one battery was made available to XXX Corps' medium artillery to fire on ground targets. On 10 June the regiment collected two captured German 88mm flak guns and proposed to use them in the anti-tank role if required. 362 and 391 Batteries each collected another of these guns on 12 June; 76th AA Bde reported that three of these four guns had anti-tank sights.

After 26 June the night air attacks on the bridgehead tailed off as the Luftwaffe concentrated on laying mines in the anchorage. Night raids on land targets resumed following Operation Charnwood (8–9 July); some of these raids were by low-flying single-engined aircraft, which the regiment engaged with Light machine guns. The last attack engaged by the regiment was on 20/21 August.

== Breakout ==
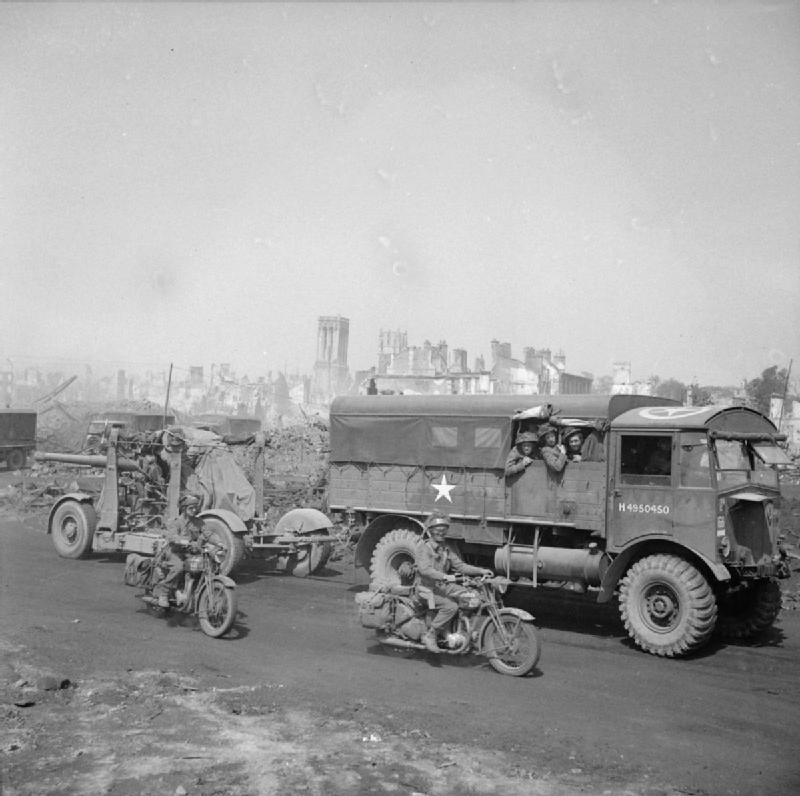
An AEC Matador tows a 3.7-inch HAA gun through the ruins of Caen, August 1944

21st Army Group broke out from the Normandy beachhead at the end of August and began to pursue the defeated German troops across Northern France. AA defence of the beachhead became less important and 76th AA Bde was released from its commitments there in order to follow the advance. On 1 September 113th HAA Rgt was ordered to redeploy to Amiens and Dieppe for AA defence. The batteries crossed the Bailey bridge at Elbeuf the following day and the regiment was in position at Bovelles on 3 September, with 362 Bty at Dieppe.

By 11 September the armies were advancing so rapidly that 76th AA Bde gave up Dieppe and concentrated at Amiens under orders to prepare for the AA defence of the vital port of Antwerp once that was in Allied hands. In the interim the brigade took over coast defence duties at Boulogne, with 113th HAA Rgt moving there on 23 September. Next day, 362/113th HAA Bty came under fire from German 88 mm guns at Cap Gris Nez, and for two days the battery replied until the target was observed to be damaged.

== The Scheldt ==
The planned move to Antwerp finally occurred in mid-October. 113th HAA Rgt handed its sites over to 103rd HAA Rgt and moved into Belgium. 76th AA Brigade's intended deployment area was still in enemy hands, so 113th HAA Rgt operated in the ground role supporting II Canadian Corps in clearing the south side of the Scheldt Estuary (the Battle of the Scheldt). The regiment's guns were in position by 18 October and began engaging targets the same day. Over succeeding weeks the targets requested by the Canadians varied from church towers and farm buildings to single pillboxes and emplacements, sometimes in support of patrols by 18th (Manitoba) Armoured Car Rgt, or 52nd (Lowland) Infantry Division's Reconnaissance Rgt. 113th HAA Regiment also carried out nighttime harassing fire on designated areas.

Lieutenant-Colonel Gilbert was later made a Chevalier of the Belgian Order of Leopold II with palm, and awarded the Belgian Croix de Guerre with palm, for his services in this campaign.

On the night of 30 October it was reported that the Germans were withdrawing from the south side of the Scheldt by sea, and 362 Bty was ordered to fire airburst high explosive shells over the evacuations. By 5 November the regiment had crossed to South Beveland in the Netherlands and deployed in the ground role around Goes where it also formed part of the 'Scheldt North' AA deployment under 76th AA Bde.

362 and 366 Batteries were ordered to occupy positions on Walcheren, at Vlissingen and Middelburg, but reconnaissance parties reported that all the routes were flooded (while western Walcheren was still in enemy hands). Finally, on 16 November, the batteries were ordered to return to Breskens on the south bank and be ferried across to Walcheren by the only LCT available. It took until 24 November before D Troop's four guns and AA radar were in position, and two days later for B Troop's guns to be ready for coastal defence at Flushing. 13 Fire Control Post at Flushing, which later came under the regiment's command, became operational on 29 November.

The only enemy aircraft seen in this period were on reconnaissance missions, usually very high, and some Messerschmitt Me 262 jet aircraft were unsuccessfully engaged, but on 8 December the regiment scored its first 'kill' since arriving in the area, when A Trp of 362 Bty destroyed a Junkers Ju 188 picked up on radar and then illuminated by searchlight. When the German Army launched its Ardennes offensive (the Battle of the Bulge) aimed at breaking through to Antwerp, 76th AA Bde was ordered to take precautions against possible attacks by German airborne troops, as well as dealing with increased air activity at night.

On 1 January 1945, the Luftwaffe launched Operation Bodenplatte: daylight attacks against Allied airfields in support of the Ardennes offensive. Between 09.20 and 09.54 some 50–60 enemy aircraft, mainly Messerschmitt Bf 109 and Focke-Wulf Fw 190, came over 76th AA Bde's area. Although the brigade's LAA guns were highly successful, HAA guns were at a disadvantage and 113th Rgt fired few rounds, although some of its gunsites engaged the fighters with small arms fire, and one site was attacked with cannon fire.

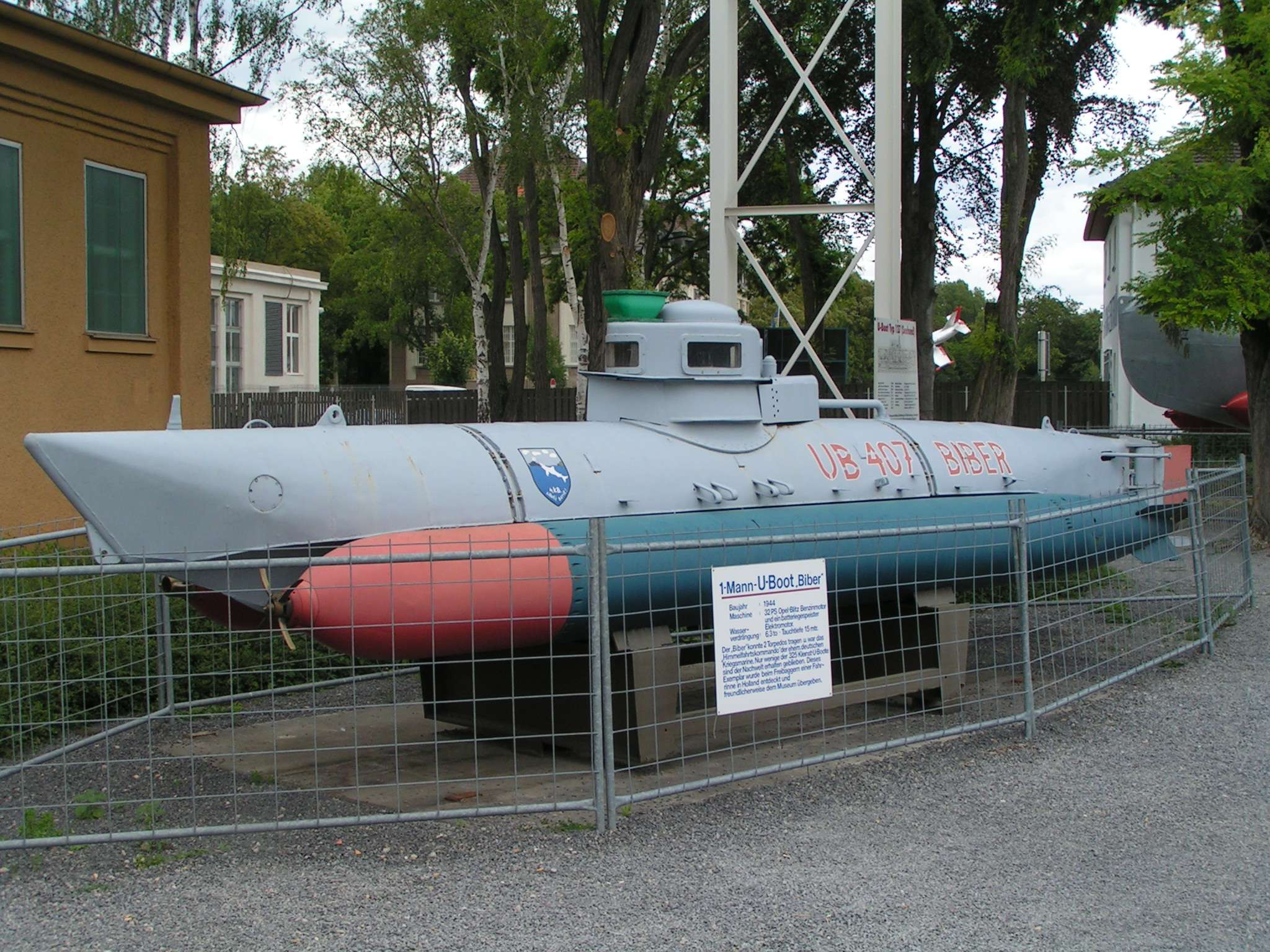
Biber midget submarine preserved at Technik Museum Speyer.

There was a smaller attack by groups of fighters on 5 January, and a moonlight attack on 24 January, but after that enemy air activity was sparse. However, German Biber midget submarines constituted a new threat to Allied shipping in the Scheldt Estuary. On 22 February, gun position H71 (B Troop at Flushing) engaged one of these submarines with 22 rounds and destroyed it, just 20 minutes before a large convoy passed on its way to Antwerp. Another periscope was reported to H71 and 13 FCP on 12 March; it was spotted by the No 1 of No 1 gun, who destroyed it with his second shot.

== Disbandment ==
REME workshops in the AA units were reorganised at the beginning of February 1945; 113th HAA Rgt's workshop was disbanded to form the basis of a new workshop unit for 103rd AA Bde, while a new smaller REME detachment (No 918) was posted to the regiment. At the end of February, the regiment began receiving new equipment: No 3 Mk V gun-laying radar (the SCR-584 radar), No 10 Predictors (the all-electric Bell Labs AAA Computer), and even four M15 Halftrack self-propelled AA guns.

However, as the war in Europe drew to its close and the remnant of the Luftwaffe was powerless, the AA commitments could be reduced and troops redeployed. The regiment was relieved from its positions on the Scheldt by 146th HAA Rgt and returned to Belgium, then on 18 April it was informed that it was to be disbanded. On 24–25 April it handed in its guns, equipment and vehicles. Disbandment began on 31 May and the process was completed on 16 June 1945.

In the postwar reorganisation of the Royal Artillery, 175th HAA Rgt was redesignated 113 HAA Rgt on 1 April 1947, but on 1 May the regiment was disbanded, retroactive to 1 April 1947.
