= 359th Heavy Anti-Aircraft Battery, Royal Artillery =

359th Heavy Anti-Aircraft Battery, RA
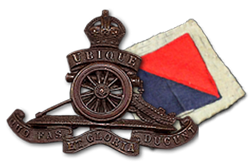
- Royal Artillery cap badge and RA patch
- Active: 21 September 1940–15 May 1944
- Country: United Kingdom
- Branch: British Army
- Role: Air defence Coastal defence
- Size: Battery
- Part of: 113th HAA Regiment; 60th (City of London) HAA Regiment; Force 122
- Engagements: Nottingham Blitz; Defence of the Falkland Islands

The 359th Heavy Anti-Aircraft Battery, Royal Artillery (359th HAA Bty) was an air defence unit of the British Army during World War II. After defending the North Midlands during The Blitz, it formed part of Force 122 sent to protect the Falkland Islands against a possible Japanese invasion, where it mounted both heavy (HAA) and light (LAA) anti-aircraft guns in inhospitable conditions.

== Origin ==
359th Heavy Anti-Aircraft Battery (359th HAA Bty) was raised in the Royal Artillery (RA) on 21 September 1940 as part of the rapid expansion of Britain's Anti-Aircraft (AA) defences. On 10 December it joined a new 113th HAA Regiment forming at No 3 AA Practice Camp at Tŷ Croes on Anglesey.

== The Blitz ==
On 10 December, the regiment moved to the Nottingham–Derby Gun Zone, where it came under the operational control of 50th AA Brigade in 2nd AA Division. 359th HAA Battery occupied two gun sites at Derby. The North and East Midlands had escaped the worst of the bombing during the early part of The Blitz, but both Nottingham and Derby were heavily attacked on the night of 8/9 May 1941 (the Nottingham Blitz).

In early June 1941, 359th HAA Bty was relieved at Derby and took over two sites at Nottingham to allow 362 HAA Bty of 113th HAA Rgt to attend a practice camp. Then in September 359th Bty transferred to 60th (City of London) HAA Rgt covering the Firth of Clyde in Scotland under the command of 42nd AA Bde in 12th AA Division.

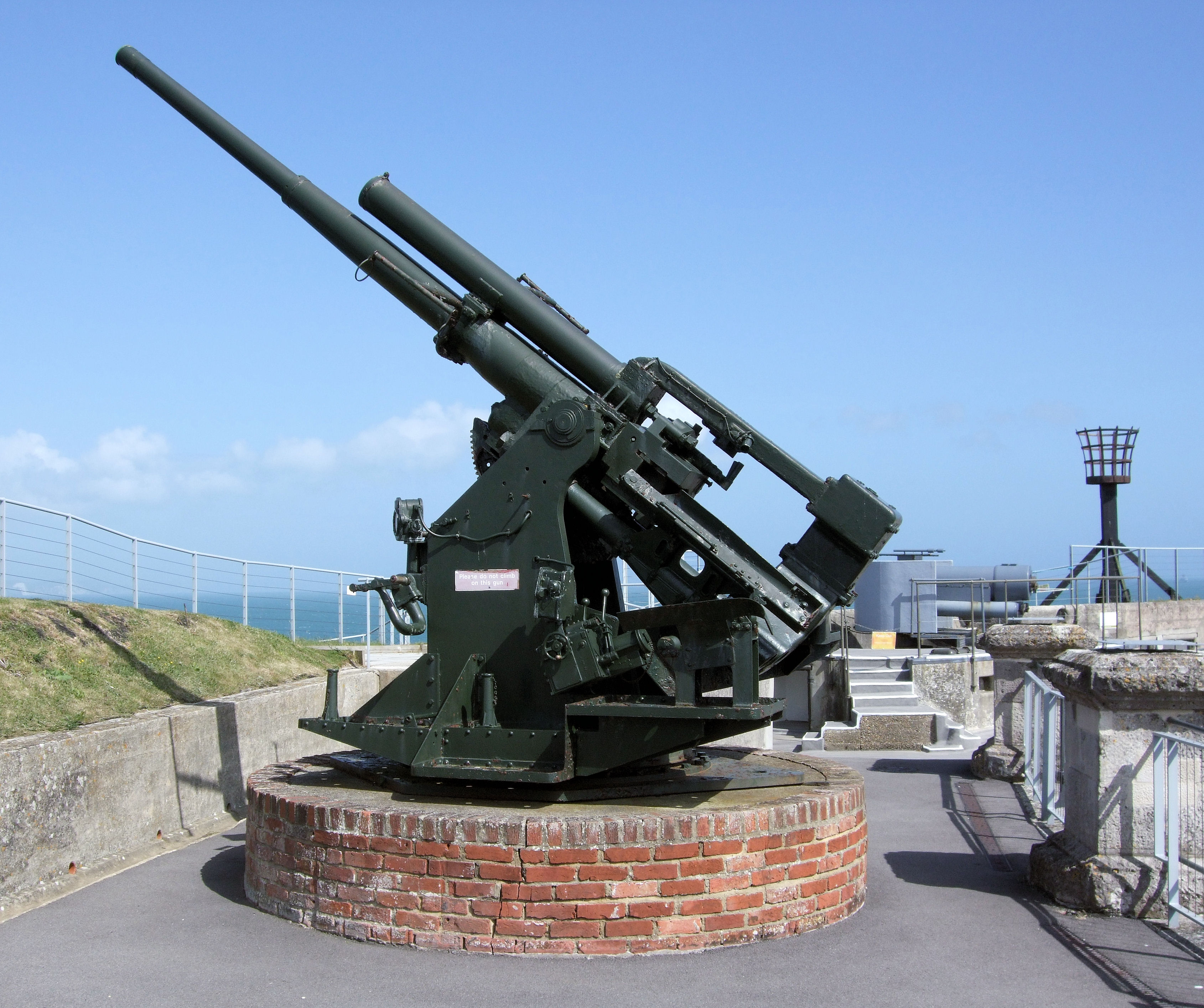
Static 3.7-inch HAA gun

At the beginning of 1942 the battery was firing at No 2 AA Practice Camp at Burrow Head, and then took over two gun sites at Irvine, North Ayrshire. Site IC1 had emplacements for four guns, but only two 3.7-inch mobile guns were in position, while IC2 had four static 3.7-inch guns and a GLII gun-laying radar. Although 60th HAA Rgt remained in 42nd AA Bde, 359th Bty was attached to 63 AA Bde, which covered Western Scotland.

The battery continued training on the guns, radar and semi-automatic plotter at Irvine until May, when it received a warning order to prepare for overseas service. On 15 May it entrained for London to proceed to the RA Depot at Woolwich together with B and C Troops from 205 LAA Bty of 84th LAA Rgt, also in 63 AA Bde. They became B and C Trps of 359 Bty, which came under direct War Office Control in June. That month it travelled to Avonmouth Docks to embark on HM Transport F9, with a strength of 10 officers and 275 other ranks, forming part of Force 122. Sailing on 18 June it landed at Cape Town on 18 July and then proceeded to the Falklands, where it landed at Port Stanley on 11 August. (The following day it officially became independent of 60th HAA Rgt).

== Force 122 ==
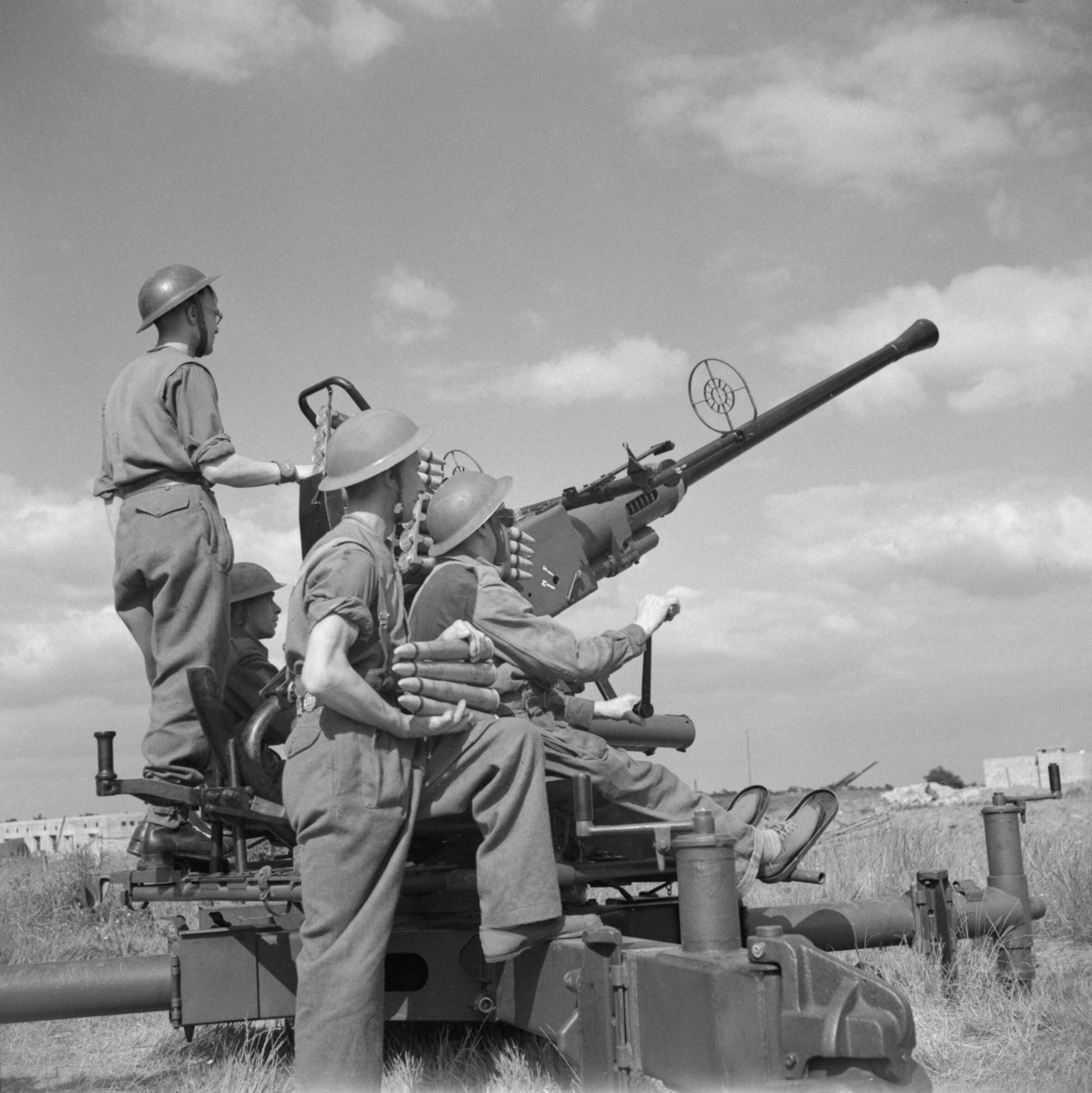
40 mm Bofors LAA gun

The purpose of the deployment was to stiffen the defences of Port Stanley, an advanced naval base with communication and fuelling facilities, which had been significant during the Battle of the River Plate, and which might be threatened by the Japanese. Previously its defence had rested with the local Falkland Islands Defence Force (FIDF), a few coast defence guns, and such ships of the Royal Navy as were there at any one time.

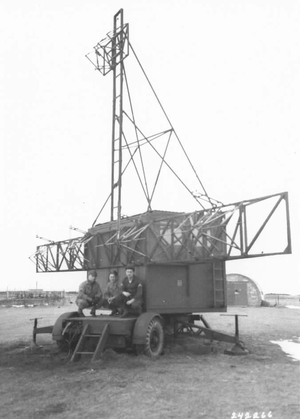
GL Mk II radar receiver van

Force 122 consisted of 11th Battalion, West Yorkshire Regiment, 359th HAA Bty, and supporting units of the Royal Engineers, Royal Army Service Corps, Royal Army Ordnance Corps and Royal Electrical and Mechanical Engineers. 359th HAA Bty brought with it eight 40 mm Bofors LAA guns equipped with Predictor No.3 (the Kerrison Predictor), and four static 3.7-inch HAA guns with instruments including a GLII radar. The guns were concentrated at the Port Stanley installations, where the HAA guns could also join the coast artillery fire plan.

The ground was rough and boggy with rocky outcrops, and the battery commander found it difficult to select good sites. A level area had to be dug out for the GLII set. By 14 August the Bofors guns were ready on three positions covering the radio station and oil tanks. However, work was not completed on the static 3.7-inch gun site in Murray Heights ('Brooke Camp', named after General Sir Alan Brooke) and the wire mesh radar 'mat' until December. The position was occupied on 15 December, and in January 1943 the 3.7s carried out proof firing in the presence of the Governor. A semi-automatic plotter was installed for 'unseen' engagement of targets using radar alone.

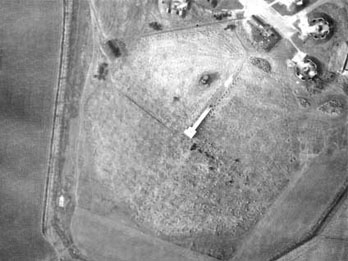
Aerial photo of a GL radar mat.

There were practice shoots, exercises, calibration and barrage rehearsals throughout 1943, but no hostile aircraft appeared. In October 1943 the battery took over responsibility for coast radar. But in December 1943 Force 122 was ordered to return to the UK, to be replaced by the smaller Force 132. 259th HAA Battery passed two Bofors guns to the FIDF, while the rest of the equipment was stored or removed. After a farewell parade for the Governor, the battery embarked for home in February 1944.

== Disbandment ==
The battery disembarked from HM Transport F2 at Liverpool on 17 March 1944 and proceeded to Grasmere in Westmorland, where disembarkation leave began. On 15 April the order was received to disband the battery. The officers and some 80 specialist other ranks were posted to RA units; of the remaining other ranks, 131 were posted to infantry training centres, and 42 to the Royal Army Service Corps. 359th HAA Battery completed its disbandment on 15 May 1944.

== External sources ==
- Royal Artillery 1939–1945
