= Slades Hill army camp =

Coordinates: 51.6588°N 0.1123°W

Slades Hill army camp with gun emplacements (top left) from a 1970s Ordnance Survey map. Camp Road shown diagonally leading to the gun emplacements.

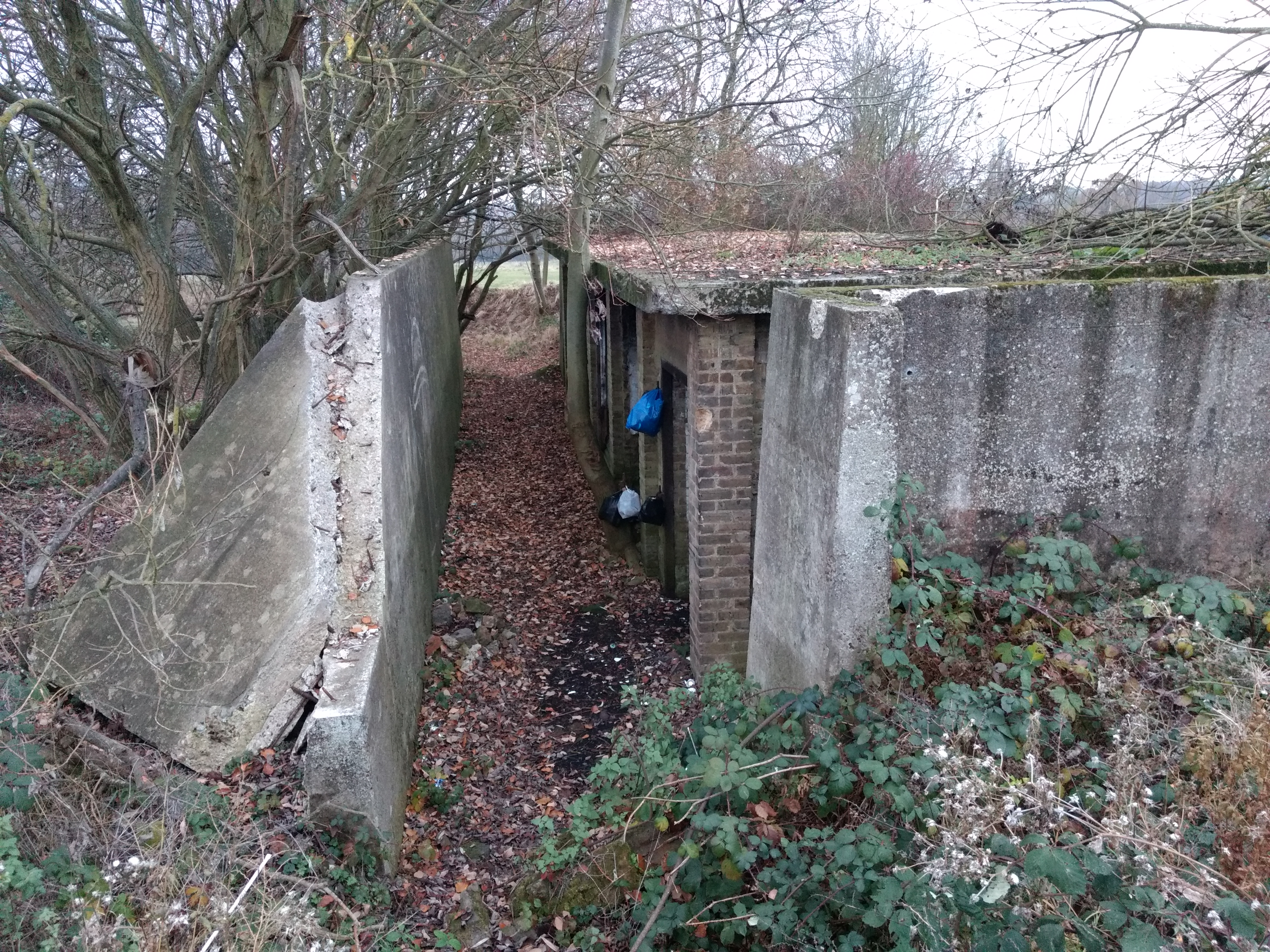
Remains of buildings at the Hog Hill gun emplacement

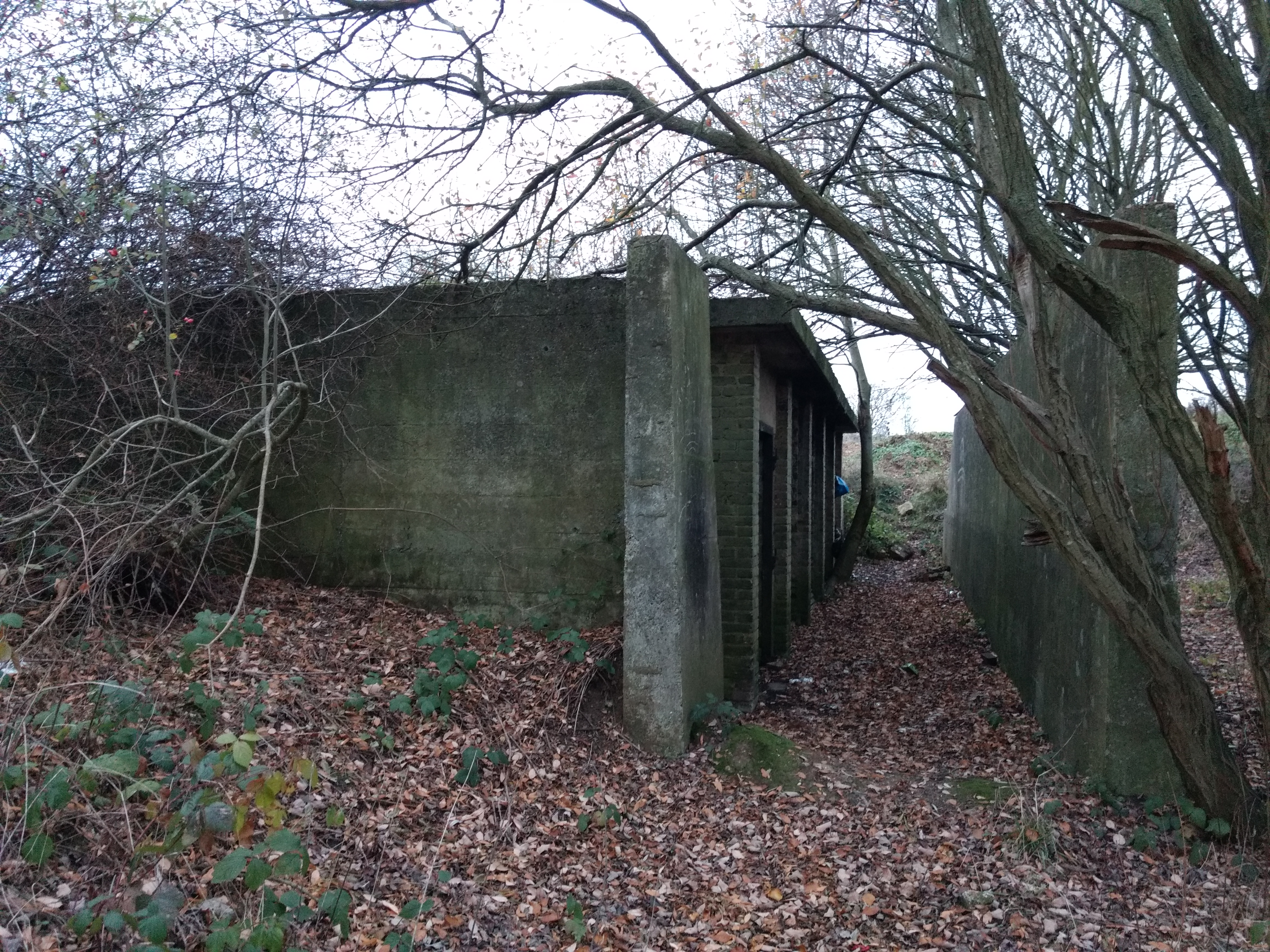
Alternate view

Slades Hill army camp was a Second World War British Army camp and anti-aircraft battery in Slades Hill, Enfield, London, that formed part of London's defences against attack by German bombers.

== Establishment ==
The camp and gun emplacement was established at the start of the Second World War in Slades Hill, Enfield. A half-battery of 3.7-inch mobile guns had previously been temporarily sited nearby during the Munich Crisis of 1938. The road to the camp from Enfield Road, previously a track, was made into a permanent way and is now known locally as Camp Road. The Merryhills Brook crosses Camp Road and Salmon's Brook runs along the eastern side of the site. To the south of the camp was the 26th Enfield Rifle and Pistol Club, which still exists, and which dates from the Boer War.

== Anti-aircraft battery ==
The anti-aircraft battery was on the adjacent Hog Hill, just north of the camp. It had four QF 4.5-inch Mark II anti-aircraft guns that were adapted from the naval gun of the same gauge and approved for land use in 1938. They were set in concrete emplacements and formed part of the defences of London against attack by German bombers. The report from the guns was said to be so loud that when they were in action the main doors of nearby Chase Farm Hospital were blasted open.

In 1941, Winston Churchill's daughter Mary, who had enlisted in the Auxiliary Territorial Service of the British Army, was posted to the battery before she was transferred to a different one in Hyde Park.

== Closure ==
After the war, the camp was converted to an army records office. It closed in the early 1960s; later, much of the site was covered in spoil from local road-building.
