= 120th Light Anti-Aircraft Regiment, Royal Artillery =

86th Searchlight Regiment, RA 120th Light Anti-Aircraft Regiment, RA
- Royal Artillery cap badge
- Active: 23 January 1941–19 January 1942 (86th S/L); 19 January 1942–15 January 1946 (120th LAA)
- Country: United Kingdom
- Branch: British Army
- Role: Air Defence
- Size: Regiment
- Part of: 76th AA Brigade
- Engagements: The Blitz; D-Day; Normandy Campaign; Battle of the Scheldt; Defence of Scheldt Estuary

The 120th Light Anti-Aircraft Regiment (120th LAA Rgt), was an air defence unit of the British Army's Royal Artillery during World War II. It landed on D-Day and saw action throughout the campaign in North West Europe, defending the vital Scheldt Estuary until the end of the war.

== Origin ==
The regiment was formed in January 1942 from the short-lived 86th Searchlight Regiment, Royal Artillery (86th S/L Rgt) which had only been raised in the previous year as part of the rapid expansion of Anti-Aircraft Command.

=== 86th Searchlight Regiment ===
86th S/L Regiment was formed on 23 January 1941 at Henderson Church Hall at Kilmarnock in Scotland during the height of the Luftwaffe's night Blitz on British cities. Major J.B. Allan was posted from 52nd (Queen's Edinburgh Royal Scots) S/L Rgt and promoted to lieutenant-colonel to command the new regiment, moving the Regimental Headquarters (RHQ) to Craigie House, Ayr, where it was joined by the advance parties of three S/L batteries that had been formed at the training regiments on 14 November 1940:

- 526 S/L Bty, formed by 233rd S/L Training Rgt at Saighton Camp from a cadre of experienced officers and men provided by 65th (Essex Regiment) S/L Rgt
- 527 S/L Bty, formed by 233rd S/L Training Rgt, cadre from 69th (3rd City of London) S/L Rgt
- 528 S/L Bty, formed by 234th S/L Training Rgt at Carlisle, cadre from 61st (South Lancashire Regiment) S/L Rgt

The regiment came under the command of 63rd AA Brigade in 12th AA Division, responsible for the air defence of West Scotland.

In mid-March the regiment began a partial deployment without searchlights to guard Vulnerable Points (VPs) in the light anti-aircraft (LAA) role, equipped with 20 mm guns (Oerlikon or Hispano) and Lewis guns. The regiment received its first 150 cm searchlights in April, by which time RHQ had returned to Kilmarnock. It became operational, equipped with 90 cm and 150 cm S/L projectors, sound locators and electrical generators, on 9 May during a Luftwaffe raid. The following night, Rudolf Hess landed by parachute some 200 yards from one of the regiment's sites and was apprehended by the local Home Guard unit.

The Blitz was ending by now, and the regiment spent the rest of 1941 uneventfully. As well as AA defence, it had a subsidiary role in spotting Parachute mines laid by Luftwaffe aircraft in the Clyde. At the beginning of 1942, the regiment gave up its searchlights and converted to the LAA gun role as 120th Light Anti-Aircraft Regiment from 19 January. The establishment of an LAA regiment was smaller than that of a S/L regiment, so 275 other ranks (ORs) were transferred to 57th (Cameronian) S/L Rgt.

=== 120th Light Anti-Aircraft Regiment ===
The new regiment consisted of RHQ and 393, 394 and 395 LAA Batteries. In February it moved to Holywood in Northern Ireland to attend 237 LAA Training Regiment, returning to Stranraer in Scotland in mid-April. It took over LAA gun sites in 63 AA Bde area equipped variously with Bofors 40 mm guns and Light machine guns, and established RHQ at West Kilbride. On 8 April 448 LAA Bty joined the regiment (this battery had been formed on 19 February from the fourth Troops of 97, 128 and 266 LAA Btys of 36th LAA Rgt). On 10 July 448 LAA Bty transferred to 84th S/L Rgt and 11 (Supplementary Reserve) LAA Bty joined from 4th (Ulster) LAA Rgt (formerly 3rd (Ulster) (SR) S/L Rgt

Training continued during the summer, and in August the regiment sent a cadre of trained officers and ORs to form a new 488 LAA Bty at 212 LAA Training Regiment at Chester (this battery later formed part of 145th LAA Rgt). At the end of August the regiment moved to Stamford, Lincolnshire to join 32nd (Midland) AA Bde in 2nd AA Division. Here it took over VPs at places across the East Midlands such as Grantham, Peterborough, Cottesmore, Coleshill and Nuneaton. On 3 October 1942 11 LAA Bty transferred to 144th LAA Rgt (it later served in the Faroe Islands garrison).

== Mobile training ==
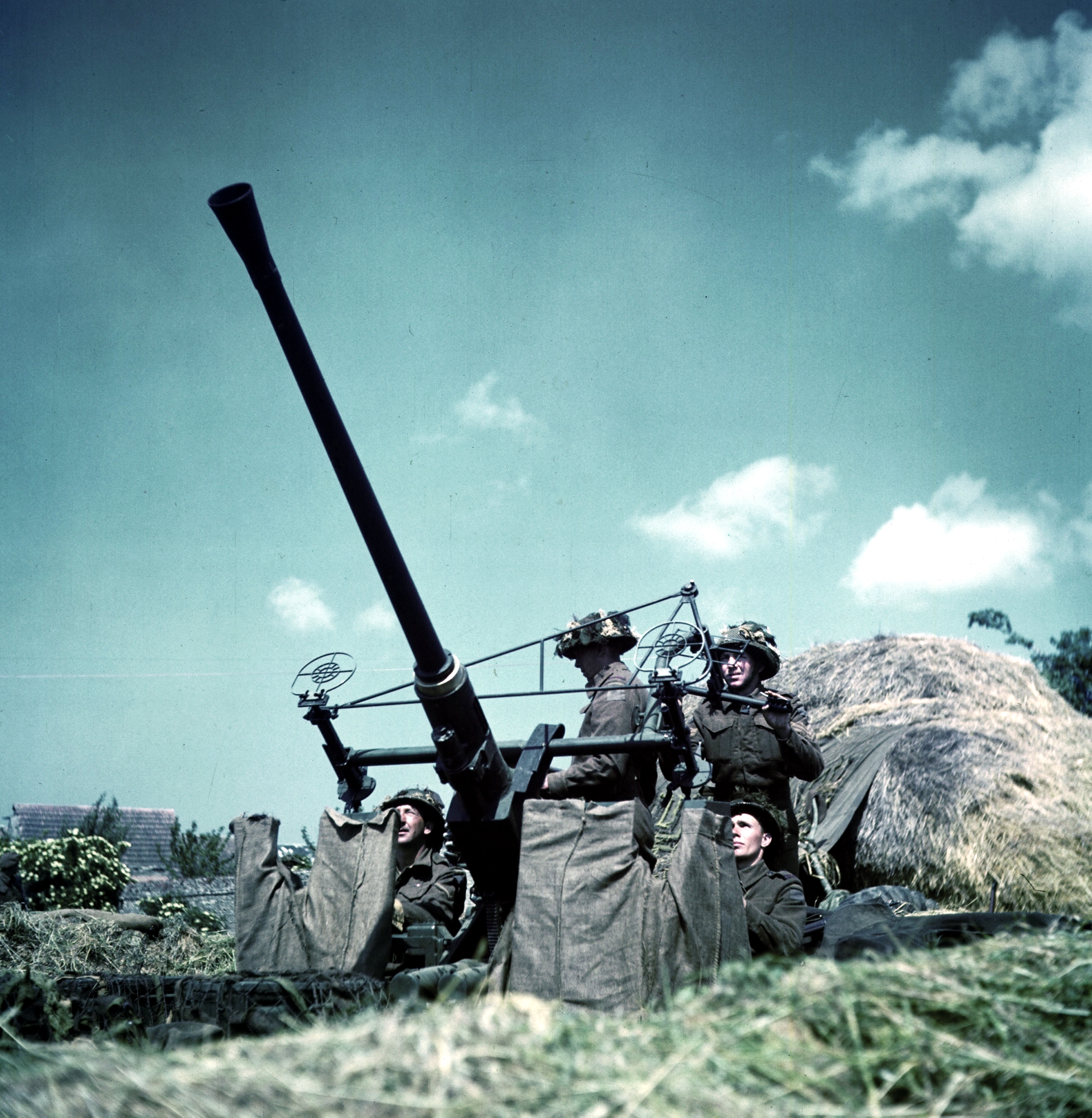
Bofors 40 mm LAA gun equipped with 'Stiffkey Stick' sights

In late 1942, 120th LAA Rgt began to prepare for mobile warfare. In November, a draft of 119 drivers was posted in from 227 Driver Training Regiment, and that month the regiment transferred to 50th AA Bde in the North Midlands. RHQ moved to South Collingham with the batteries moving to sites in Nottinghamshire and Derbyshire. In December–January the regiment was at Haltwhistle battle training area, next it went to 11 AA Bde Tactical School at Leigh-on-Sea for a month's mobile training, and then to Oulton Park Camp near Tarporley, Cheshire.

On 13 March 120th LAA Rgt was ordered to mobilise as part of the field force, and it began receiving its own towed Bofors guns (previously it had operated static guns at fixed sites). Mobile LAA regiments had an establishment of three Batteries each of three Troops equipped with six towed Bofors. As a mobile unit, it was also given its own Royal Electrical and Mechanical Engineers (REME) workshop and Royal Corps of Signals detachment.

Upon mobilisation, 120th LAA Rgt was withdrawn from Air Defence of Great Britain and came under War Office control; however it was immediately lent back to AA Command, which required more LAA guns to deal with Luftwaffe 'hit and run' attacks, and deployed to the Southampton area. At first it formed part of 73rd AA Bde, but on 1 June 1943 it came under the command of the newly formed 76th AA Bde in Cheshire, which was training for the planned invasion of Normandy (Operation Overlord).

In June 1943 the regiment attended No 16 AA Practice Camp at Clacton-on-Sea before returning to Cheshire in July, with RHQ at Marbury Hall. After a second course at Clacton, the regiment stayed in Essex, first at Wakes Colne, near Colchester, and then at Wimbush Camp near Saffron Walden. In September it received 18 self-propelled (SP) Bofors guns (these were usually mounted on Morris C9B 4 x 4 lorries) and handed in its towed Mk II and Mk III Bofors in exchange for Mk I guns using 'Stiffkey Stick' sights. In October, the regiment was in Bournemouth for beach landing exercises in cooperation with 113th Heavy AA Rgt, under whose command it would operate on D-Day. After visits to No 14 LAA Practice Camp at Nethertown, Cumberland, and Harlech Anti-Tank Range in Wales, the regiment returned to Bournemouth at the end of the year.

At the beginning of 1944, 120th LAA Rgt moved to Southend-on-Sea, where in late March it received nine Crusader AA Mark I tracked self-propelled (SP) Bofors guns, which would have a special role in the assault landing on D-Day. In addition, 76th AA Brigade assigned 1618 LAA Rgt Platoon of 323rd Company, Royal Army Service Corps (RASC), to the regiment to provide mobility. In March the regiment moved back to Southampton for exercises, where it remained until May, when the units required for the assault phase of Overlord began to gather in southern England. 120th LAA Rgt was already at Southampton while the rest of the brigade (including the rear echelons of 120th LAA Rgt) concentrated at Southend.

== D-Day ==
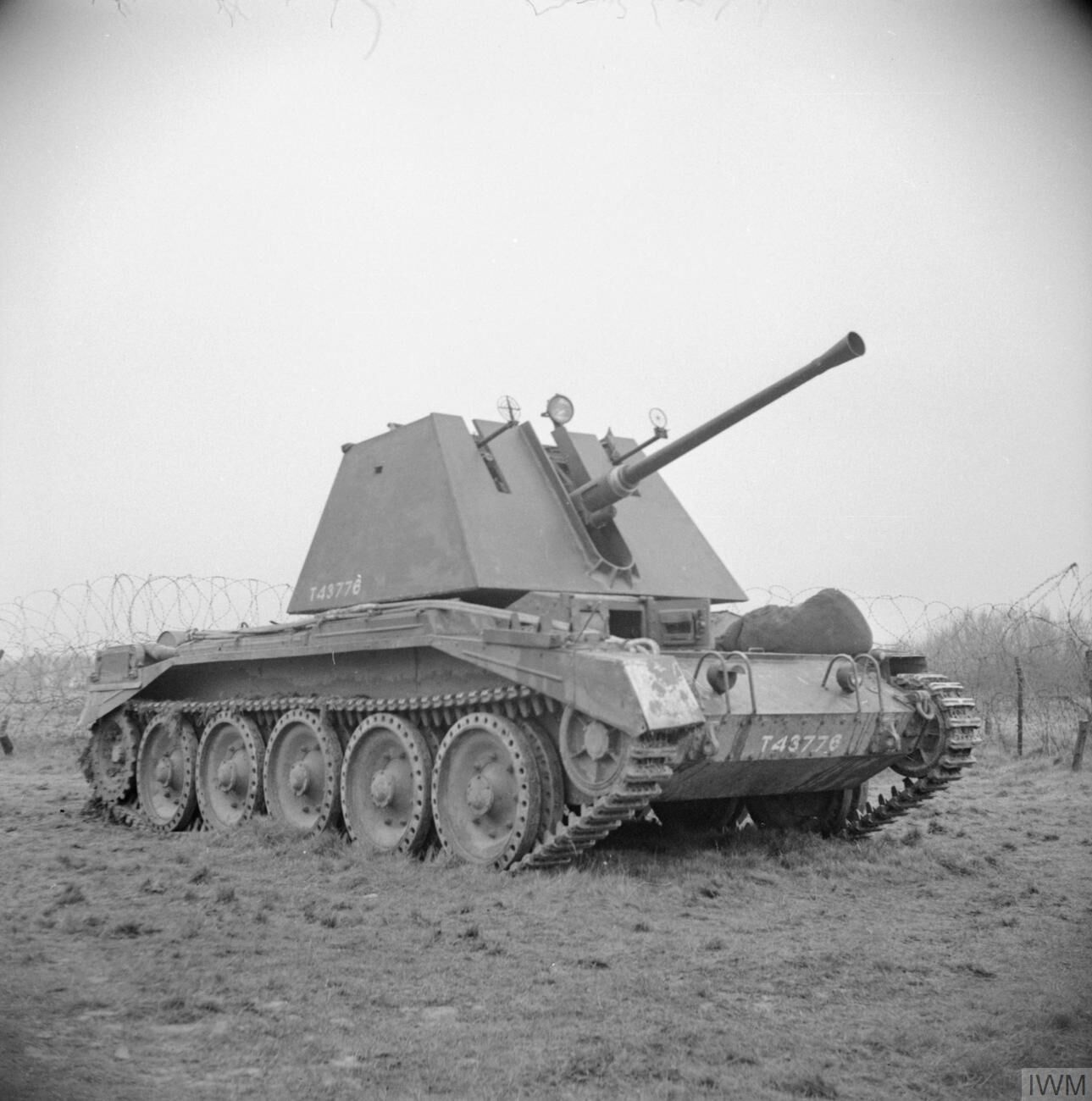
Crusader AA with 40 mm Bofors gun

In Second Army's plan for Overlord, 76th AA Bde was to support XXX Corps in its landing on Gold Beach. LAA defence was emphasised at the start of the operation, since low-level attack by Luftwaffe aircraft was considered the most likely threat. Assault units were to be landed with minimum scales of equipment, to be brought up to strength by parties landing later.

For the assault phase, RHQ, 394 and 395 Btys of 120th LAA Rgt formed part of the AA Assault Group assigned to 50th (Northumbrian) Infantry Division landing on Gold Beach, under the command of RHQ 113th HAA Rgt. 320 Bty (A, B and C Trps) of 93rd LAA Rgt was also placed under command of 120th LAA Rgt for the landing; this battery was equipped with 18 triple mountings of 20 mm guns (Oerlikon or the new Polstens), half of them mounted on Crusader chassis.

394 Battery landed two guns on King Sector of Gold Beach by 08.45 (75 minutes after H-Hour). The first of E Trp's Crusaders bogged down and its engine was flooded, but the gun remained manned although the Mk I Bofors it was towing was 'drowned'. The rest of E Trp had been diverted. F Trp's recce party beached at 09.15, but its first Crusader, towing a Mk I Bofors, did not arrive until 17.00, and the remainder at 20.30.

On Jig Sector, H Trp's recce party landed 15 minutes after H-Hour and had got four guns ashore by 14.40, together with two triple 20 mm mountings of B Trp 320 Bty. But fighting was still going on around Le Hamel and rough seas meant that further unloading was delayed. J Troop got three guns ashore (one towed gun being drowned) but the LCT carrying the rest of the troop suffered an engine failure and could not land until D + 3 (9 June). By the end of D-Day, 395 Bty had 9 Bofors and two 20 mm mountings ashore, covering the beach exits, where men of H Trp had helped the Royal Engineers to clear mines.

The landing beaches were 'solid with tracked vehicles' and the landing craft carrying the guns had to wait, so detachments of 120th LAA Rgt acted as infantry, clearing enemy positions while awaiting the arrival of their guns. While digging in on the beach, Gunner George Hurst saw a man washed off a drowned vehicle into the sea and swam out under fire in an attempt to save him, for which Hurst was awarded the Military Medal.

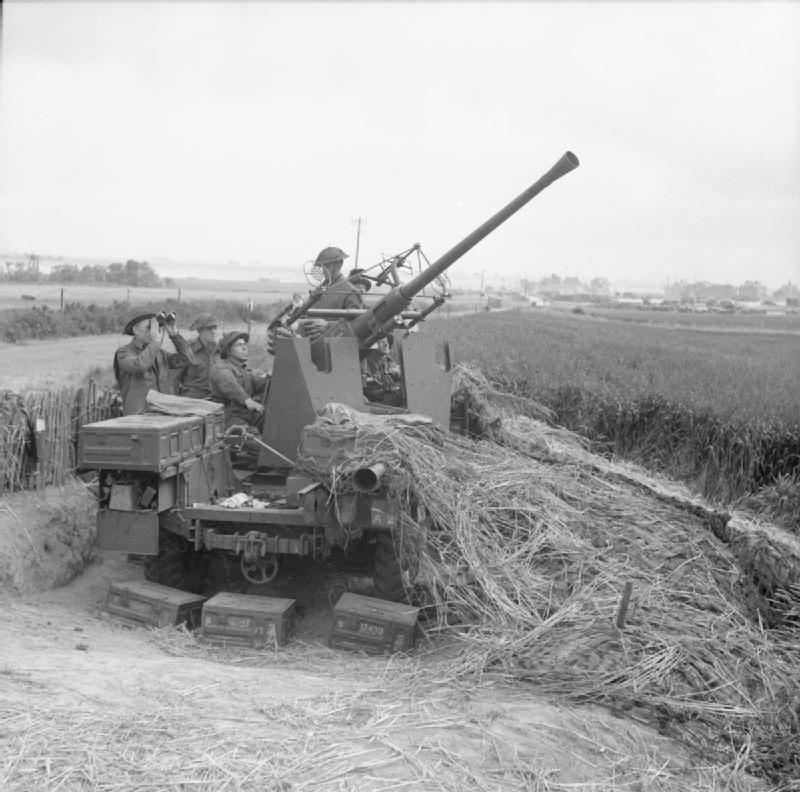
Bofors gun at Le Hamel, 17 June 1944.

The RHQ command group had landed on King Beach about 2 hours after H-Hour, and spent the night in a shell crater.

By midnight, the AA Defence Commander on Gold Beach reported the situation:

King Sector:

- 394/120 LAA Rgt – 8 x 40 mm
- 320/93 LAA Rgt – 6 x triple 20mm

Jig Sector:

- 395/120 LAA Rgt – 9 x 40mm
- 320/93 LAA Rgt – 2 x triple 20 mm

There was little enemy air activity during the night. For example, F Troop fired 50 rounds without success, but at 06.30 on D + 1 a lone Focke-Wulf Fw 190 crossed the beach and was shot down by the first round from Sergeant Appleby's No 3 Detachment. Later, No 2 Detachment shelled a German strongpoint that had caused casualties to 2nd Battalion Hertfordshire Regiment of No 9 Beach Group.

The rest of the regiment turned up between D + 1 and D + 4, some landing craft having had to return to England and been sent over again. 393 Bty and D Troop of 392 Bty had embarked in the Thames and sailed through the Straits of Dover under German shellfire. The gunners provided relief crews for the ships' Bofors and 20 mm guns. These guns arrived and deployed during D + 2 and D + 3.

== Normandy ==
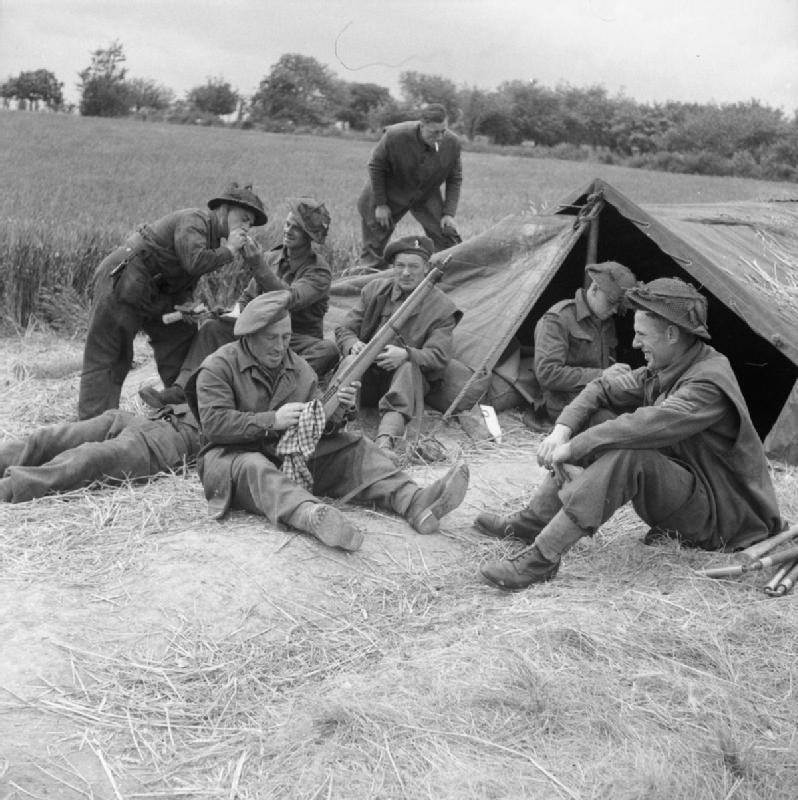
Off-duty crew of 393 LAA Bty in Normandy 17 June 1944.

In the days following the landings, 76th AA Bde's guns moved inland to extend cover from the landing beaches to Port-en-Bessin and Arromanches, where a Mulberry harbour was being constructed.

Most Luftwaffe attacks concentrated on the shipping and on the bridges at the other end of the beachhead, so there was less activity over 120th LAA Rgt: at the end of June, the regimental war diary recorded that during the month there had been 'surprisingly slight enemy activity – not a single determined attack by a formation of aircraft over the Regimental area'. Nevertheless, 120th LAA claimed three Category I and two Category II 'kills' during the month.

On 9 July, 373 LAA Bty (detached from 114th LAA Rgt) came under command of 120th LAA Rgt, and on 14 July the regiment redeployed to cover the Mulberry. Enemy air activity over the beachhead remained slight in July, and the regiment only claimed two Cat I kills for the month.

The guns of 120 LAA Rgt were only engaged on four nights during August. 373 LAA Bty returned to its parent unit in mid-August, and at the end of the month the unreliable Crusader SP guns were replaced by towed Mk I Bofors and the regiment reorganised so that each battery consisted of one Troop of SP Bofors on lorry chassis and two Troops of towed guns.

== Breakout ==
Once 21st Army Group broke out of its beachhead, 76th AA Bde was relieved of its responsibilities on the coast on 1 September and was made available to support the advance. 62nd LAA Battery of 20th LAA Rgt (which had been manning the AA guns on the 'Gooseberry' blockships off the beaches) was attached to the regiment for the advance. The regiment deployed at Amiens (393 and 395 Btys) and Dieppe (62 and 394 Btys) on 2 September.

On 14 September 62 Bty left and the regiment moved on to guard the river crossings at Abbeville (393 and 394 Btys) and Saint-Valery-en-Caux (395 Bty). As the advance continued, 120th LAA Rgt joined the rest of 76th AA Bde at Boulogne for AA and coast defence the day after the port surrendered on 22 September. But the regiment did not fire a single round during September.

In October, 393 handed in the last of the regiment's SP guns, so that it was now all-towed. In the middle of the month, 76th AA Bde was relieved by 103 AA Bde, and moved into Belgium; 395/120 Bty remained at Boulogne, where it was operating an early warning station for the whole LAA defence of the town.

== The Scheldt ==
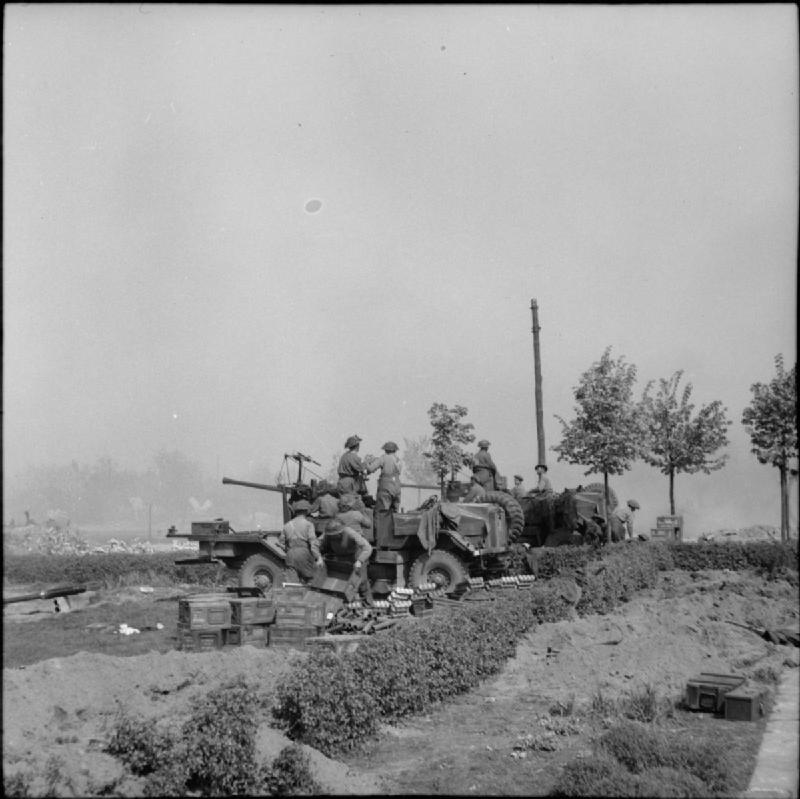
SP Bofors, seen here in action against German positions in April 1945.

120th LAA Regiment was deployed to protect the two Army Groups Royal Artillery (9th AGRA and 2nd Canadian AGRA), which were supporting 3rd Canadian Division's operations to clear the Breskens Pocket along the Leopold Canal (Operation Switchback).

During the Leopold Canal battle, the regiment's guns had to make rapid deployments in flooded and heavily mined ground under intermittent shellfire. Captain Alan Johnstone carried out hazardous reconnaissances in the forward areas for his troop, and Gunner Daniel Kelly drove his gun tractor into action with determination, on occasions clearing mines to get his gun into action. Both were awarded the Belgian Croix de Guerre with palms, and Johnstone was also made a Chevalier of the Belgian Order of Leopold II. Yet the regiment's guns did not have to engage a single enemy aircraft during October.

Once the Canadians had cleared the German defenders, the regiment closed up to the southern side of the Scheldt Estuary and was rejoined by 395 Bty. During November the Canadians and 52nd (Lowland) Infantry Division took South Beveland (Operation Vitality) and 120th LAA Rgt crossed to defend the anchorages and channel of the Scheldt, with 394 Bty deploying to Flushing on Walcheren after that island was captured (Operation Infatuate).

The port of Antwerp was vital to the Allied war effort, and large numbers of AA units were deployed to defend the approaches up the Scheldt. 120th LAA Regiment remained in the North Scheldt area under 76th AA Bde until the end of the war. Antwerp itself was heavily bombarded by V-1 flying bombs but there was little air activity over the estuary, although 394 Bty fired an emergency barrage on 10 December, destroying one enemy aircraft.

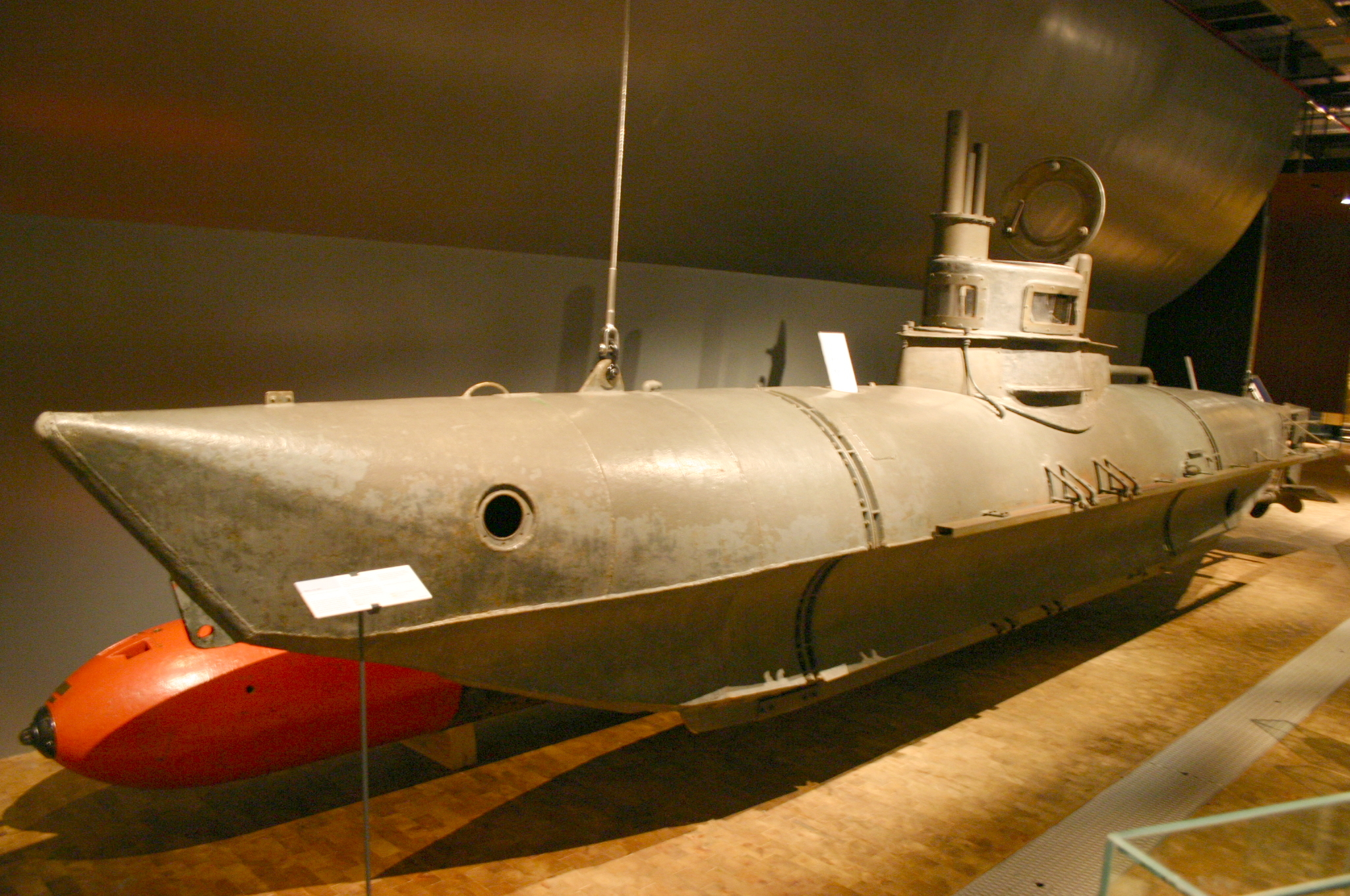
Biber midget submarine preserved at Deutsches Technik Museum Berlin.

When the German Army launched its Ardennes offensive (the Battle of the Bulge) aimed at breaking through to Antwerp, 76th AA Bde was ordered to take precautions against possible attacks by German airborne troops. If that happened, 394 Bty at Flushing would fall under the command of 113th HAA Rgt while 120th LAA Rgt's second-in-command, Major J.R. Morgan, would assume command of an infantry force composed of 393 and 395 Btys together with 391 Bty of 113th HAA and 5 Bty of 2nd S/L Rgt to hunt down any attackers. In the event, no breakthrough or airborne landing occurred, but on 1 January 1945, the Luftwaffe launched Operation Bodenplatte: daylight attacks against Allied airfields in support of the Ardennes offensive, described by the regimental war diary as the 'first daylight activity on any appreciable scale since [the] unit deployed in this area'.

After that, enemy air activity was sparse and the AA guns were more concerned with coastal defence. On 4 January a section of 395 Bty redeployed to Westkapelle at the western tip of Walcheren in an anti-submarine role. On 17 February this section destroyed an enemy one-man torpedo, followed by a Biber midget submarine on 8 March and two more manned torpedoes on 12 March.

== Disbandment ==
Shortly afterwards the Allies crossed the Rhine and as the war came to an end many AA units were disbanded or converted to other roles. Regimental REME workshops had already been disbanded in mid-February and replaced by a single brigade workshop leaving just a small REME detachment with RHQ. However, 120th LAA Rgt was retained for garrison duties in occupied Germany. After VE Day it handed in its guns and tractors and concentrated near Antwerp. In June it moved to Bochum to assume guard and patrol duties, then moved to Emsdetten, where it remained as part of British Army of the Rhine for the rest of its service.

The first men of the regiment began to be demobilised from July 1945, including Lt-Col Allan, who had commanded the regiment since the beginning and had been awarded an OBE in February. Major Morgan was promoted to replace him. In December the remaining original intake of the regiment (227 ORs) were demobilised, leaving the unit at roughly half strength. 120th LAA Regiment commenced its disbandment at Emsdetten on 15 January 1946, and completed the process by 30 January.

== See also ==
Photo album and roll of honour of 120th LAA Rgt while serving in the Netherlands.

== External sources ==
- Royal Artillery 1939–1945
- Royal Artillery Units Netherlands 1944–1945
