= 50th Light Anti-Aircraft Brigade =

50th Light Anti-Aircraft Brigade 76 Anti-Aircraft Brigade
- Active: 24 August 1939–9 March 1946; 1 January 1947 – 14 November 1950
- Country: United Kingdom
- Branch: Territorial Army
- Type: Anti-Aircraft Brigade
- Role: Air Defence
- Part of: 2 AA Division; 5 AA Group; 21st Army Group; British Army of the Rhine
- Garrison/HQ: RAF Hucknall; Leicester
- Engagements: Battle of Britain; The Blitz; Defence of Brussels

50th Light Anti-Aircraft Brigade was an air defence formation of Britain's Territorial Army (TA) during the Second World War. It defended the North Midlands of England during The Blitz and later helped to protect Brussels from V-1 flying bombs during the Campaign in North West Europe.

== Mobilisation ==
50th Light Anti-Aircraft Brigade was created just before the outbreak of war by Anti-Aircraft Command as part of the expanding anti-aircraft (AA) defences of the TA. It officially came into existence on 24 August 1939 when AA Command mobilised ahead of the official declaration of war on 3 September.

Brigade headquarters was formed at RAF Hucknall, near Nottingham, which was the HQ of 2nd AA Division. At first the only unit under the brigade's command was 26th Light Anti-Aircraft Regiment, Royal Artillery (26th LAA Rgt RA), at Derby. This consisted of 114, 115 and 116 LAA Batteries and was designated as a mobile reserve. The brigade was given responsibility for AA defence of Derby, Nottingham, and the East Midlands.

=== Order of Battle ===
During the winter of 1939–40 the new brigade took over a number of Royal Artillery (RA) and Royal Engineers (RE) units from other brigades in 2nd AA Division. By May 1940, its composition was as follows:

50th AA Brigade

- 68th (North Midland) AA Rgt, RA – heavy AA (HAA) gun unit in the Derby and Nottingham Gun Zone
  - 200, 222 (Derby), 276, 277 AA Batteries
- 28th LAA Rgt, RA – forming at Nottingham
  - 53 (Derby), 112 (Nottingham), 113 (Warwick) Btys
- 41st (5th North Staffordshire Regiment) AA Bn, RE
  - 362, 363, 364, 365 AA Companies – searchlight (S/L) unit illuminating targets for 68th AA Rgt
- 42nd (Robin Hoods, Sherwood Foresters) AA Bn, RE – S/L unit
  - 366, 367, 368, 369 AA Cos
- 58th (Middlesex) AA Bn, RE – S/L unit
  - 344, 425, 426 AA Cos

== Home Defence ==
2 AA Division's formation sign

In July 1940, at the height of invasion fears after the Dunkirk evacuation, AA Brigades were required to form mobile columns available to combat enemy paratroopers. 50th LAA Bde's column called 'Macduff' consisted of one HAA battery and one S/L company to operate directly under 2 AA Division. In addition, Brigade HQ ordered all AA units to cooperate with field forces or the Local Defence Volunteers (LDVs, later called the Home Guard) by providing fighting patrols and guards when they could not perform their primary AA role (S/L units in daylight, for example). S/L detachments were routinely provided with Lewis guns for self-defence against air attack, which would be useful in a ground defence role, and they were ordered to prepare Molotov cocktails.

The brigade's area (Sector L in I Corps) was divided into four belts of resistance based on the widely-spread S/L sites:

- Coastal Belt: 1st Infantry Division formed the active defence outside the S/L defended localities
- Central Belt: artillery units from I Corps were forming mobile columns based at S/L Company HQs
- Rear Belt: other I Corps troops were forming mobile columns based at S/L Company HQs
- Remaining S/L areas: Company areas would be reinforced by the LDVs

== Battle of Britain and Blitz ==
On 1 August 1940, all the RE AA Battalions and companies were transferred to the RA and designated Searchlight regiments and batteries, and during the year the AA regiments equipped with 3-inch or 3.7-inch guns were designated Heavy Anti-Aircraft (HAA) to distinguish them from the new Light Anti-Aircraft (LAA) regiments equipped with Bofors 40 mm guns or Light machine guns (LMGs). The Midlands were barely affected during the Battle of Britain, though the Derby Barrage fired for the first time on 19 August 1940, and a series of night raids on Liverpool late in the month passed overhead.

The North and East Midlands had escaped the worst of the bombing during the early part of the Blitz, but both Nottingham and Derby were heavily attacked on the night of 8/9 May 1941 (the Nottingham Blitz).

=== Order of Battle ===
During The Blitz from autumn 1940 to May 1941, the brigade had the following composition:

- 67th (York and Lancaster Regiment) HAA Rgt
  - 187, 188, 189, 198 HAA Btys
- 113 HAA Rgt (part) – new unit formed November, joined Nottingham–Derby Gun Zone December 1940
  - 359, 362, 366, 391 HAA Btys
- 28th LAA Rgt – as above
- 38th LAA Rgt (part)
  - 51, 124, 125 LAA Btys
- 64th LAA Rgt (part) – new unit formed November 1940
  - 191, 192, 193 LAA Btys
- 38th (The King's Regiment) S/L Rgt (part)
  - 350, 351, 352, 352 S/L Btys
- 42nd (Robin Hoods, Sherwood Foresters) S/L Rgt – as above
- 50th (Northamptonshire Regiment) S/L Rgt
  - 400, 401, 402, 403 S/L Btys

113 HAA Rgt's gun sites were initially split between 50th AA Bde protecting Nottingham and Derby, and 32nd (Midland) AA Bde guarding the East Midlands.

== Mid-War ==
In the spring of 1941, 50th LAA Bde was split up, keeping the S/L regiments and LAA (and thus reverting to being a 'Light' AA brigade) while a new 66th AA Bde took over the HAA guns and rockets:

AA Command redeployed its S/L units during the summer of 1941 into 'Indicator Belts' of radar-controlled S/L clusters covering approaches to the RAF's Night-fighter sectors, repeated by similar belts covering GDAs. Inside each belt was a 20-mile deep 'Killer Belt' of single S/Ls cooperating with night-fighters patrolling defined 'boxes'. The pattern was designed to ensure that raids penetrating deeply towards the Midlands GDAs would cross more than one belt, and the GDAs had more S/Ls at close spacing. The number of LAA units to protect Vital Points such as airfields was growing, albeit slowly.

=== Order of Battle 1941–42 ===
Over next year the brigade's composition changed as follows:

- 144 (Mixed) HAA Rgt – joined from 66th AA Bde August 1942
  - 497, 498, 503, 504 HAA Btys
- 20 LAA Rgt – joined August 1942
- 28 LAA Rgt – left for India autumn 1941
  - 106, 112 Btys
  - 53 Bty – left in early June 1941
  - 250 Bty – joined summer 1941
- 111 LAA Rgt – new unit formed from 7th Bn Dorset Regiment December 1941; left July 1942
  - 348, 349, 350, 363 LAA Btys
- 139 LAA Rgt – new unit formed July 1942 from existing batteries; left September 1942
  - 94, 177, 230 LAA Btys
- 42 (Robin Hoods, Sherwood Foresters) S/L Rgt– as above
- 50 (Northamptonshire Regiment) S/L Rgt – left spring 1942
- 15 AA 'Z' Rgt – rocket regiment joined from 66th AA Bde August 1942

'Mixed' units were those where women of the Auxiliary Territorial Service (ATS) were integrated into the unit. 'Z' Regiments were equipped with Z Battery rocket launchers.

== Reorganisation ==
2 AA Division, like the other AA Corps and Divisions, was disbanded and replaced on 1 October 1942 by a new AA Group structure. The Midlands and East Anglia were covered by 5 AA Group, headquartered at Hucknall and coinciding with No. 12 Group RAF.

=== Order of Battle 1942–44 ===
Following this reorganisation the brigade's composition changed as follows:

- 144 (Mixed) HAA Rgt – as above; left July 1943
- 147 HAA Rgt – joined from 51st AA Bde July 1943; left for 57th AA Bde August 1943
  - 360, 403, 427 HAA Btys
- 172 (Mixed) HAA Rgt – new unit formed August 1942; left July 1943
  - 517 HAA Bty (attached to 32nd AA Bde)
  - 570, 573 HAA Btys
  - 582 HAA Bty (attached to 31st (North Midland) AA Bde)
  - 662 HAA Bty – joined June 1943
- 20 LAA Rgt – left for 47th AA Bde November 1942
- 120 LAA Rgt – joined from 32nd AA Bde December 1942; left for mobile training summer 1943
  - 393, 394, 395 LAA Btys
- 142 LAA Rgt – joined from 31st AA Bde April 1943; left for 65th AA Bde August 1943
  - 374, 398, 465, 483 LAA Btys
- 36 (Middlesex) S/L Rgt – joined from 40th AA Bde September 1943; left for 27th (Home Counties) AA Bde January 1944
  - 317, 345, 346, 424 S/L Btys
- 42 (Robin Hoods, Sherwood Foresters) S/L Rgt – left for 39th AA Bde early 1943
- 43 (5th Duke of Wellington's) S/L Rgt – joined from 61st AA Bde October 1943
  - 370, 372, 373 S/L Btys
- 49 (West Yorkshire Regiment) S/L Rgt – joined from 31st AA Bde March 1944
  - 395, 396, 398 S/L Btys
- 58 (Middlesex) S/L Rgt – rejoined from 57th AA Bde February 1944; left March 1944; returned July–September 1944
  - 425, 426 S/L Btys
  - 314 S/L Bty (from July 1944)
- 62 (Loyals) S/L Rgt – joined from 53rd Light AA Bde December 1942; left for 69th AA Bde early 1943
  - 435, 436, 437 S/L Btys
- 64 (Essex Regiment) S/L Rgt – joined from 40th AA Bde March 1944; left for 41st (London) AA Bde July 1944
  - 441, 442, 443 S/L Btys
- 65 (Essex Regiment) S/L Rgt – joined from 32nd AA Bde July 1943; left for 65th AA Bde August 1943
  - 444, 445, 446 S/L Btys
- 84 S/L Rgt – joined early 1943 from 39th AA Bde; disbanded October 1943
  - 512, 518, 519 S/L Btys
  - 517 S/L Bty (attached to 32nd AA Bde)
- 15 AA 'Z' Rgt – became Mixed November 1942; became Area Regiment outside brigade control April 1944
  - 120, 180, 181, 219 Z Btys
  - 195 Z Bty (attached to 32 AA Bde) – left January 1943

== Overlord planning ==
In the planning for Operation Overlord (the Allied invasion of Normandy), No. 85 Group RAF was to be responsible for Night-fighter cover of the beachhead and bases in Normandy after D-Day, and was keen to have searchlight assistance in the same way as Fighter Command had in the UK. Two AA brigade HQs experienced in commanding searchlights, 31st (North Midland) and 50th (now often referred to as 50 S/L Bde), were to be withdrawn from AA Command to join 21st Army Group's GHQ AA Troops for this purpose. A detailed plan was drawn up for a belt of S/L positions deployed from Caen to the Cherbourg peninsula. This required nine S/L batteries of 24 lights, spaced at 6000 yard intervals, six rows deep. Each battery area was to have an orbit beacon, around which up to four fighters would be positioned at varying heights. These would be allocated by fighter controllers, and the S/Ls would assist by illuminating targets and indicating raid approaches, while area boundaries would be marked by vertical S/Ls. Six S/L regiments were specially trained for this work, with 50th S/L Bde's share to be as follows:

- 2 S/L Rgt – from 64th AA Bde
- 43 (5th Duke of Wellington's) S/L Rgt
- 49 (West Yorkshire) S/L Rgt

In practice, most of this plan was never implemented, liaison with the US Army units around Cherbourg having proved problematical once they were on the ground. 50th S/L Bde therefore remained in AA Command, waiting to cross to Normandy until long after D-Day. In the event, 43 and 49 S/L Rgts did not deploy to North West Europe in the AA role, but were instead converted to garrison regiments for line of communication duties in October 1944.

== North West Europe ==
50th Searchlight Brigade HQ left 5 AA Group in AA Command in September 1944. 2 Searchlight Regiment was serving in the AA role with 21st Army Group (with its batteries under other brigade HQs) in late 1944, and 50 S/L Bde HQ was finally employed in early March 1945 when it relieved 101st AA Bde at Brussels.

Brussels had been under bombardment by V-1 flying bombs (codenamed 'Divers') since October. To deal with this menace, an integrated system ('Brussels X' ) had been developed with warning stations and observation posts, supported by radar and searchlights. The system had been under the operational command of 101st AA Brigade while 80th AA Bde was responsible for all early warning and tracking for Brussels and Antwerp. The Brussels X operational units were as follows:

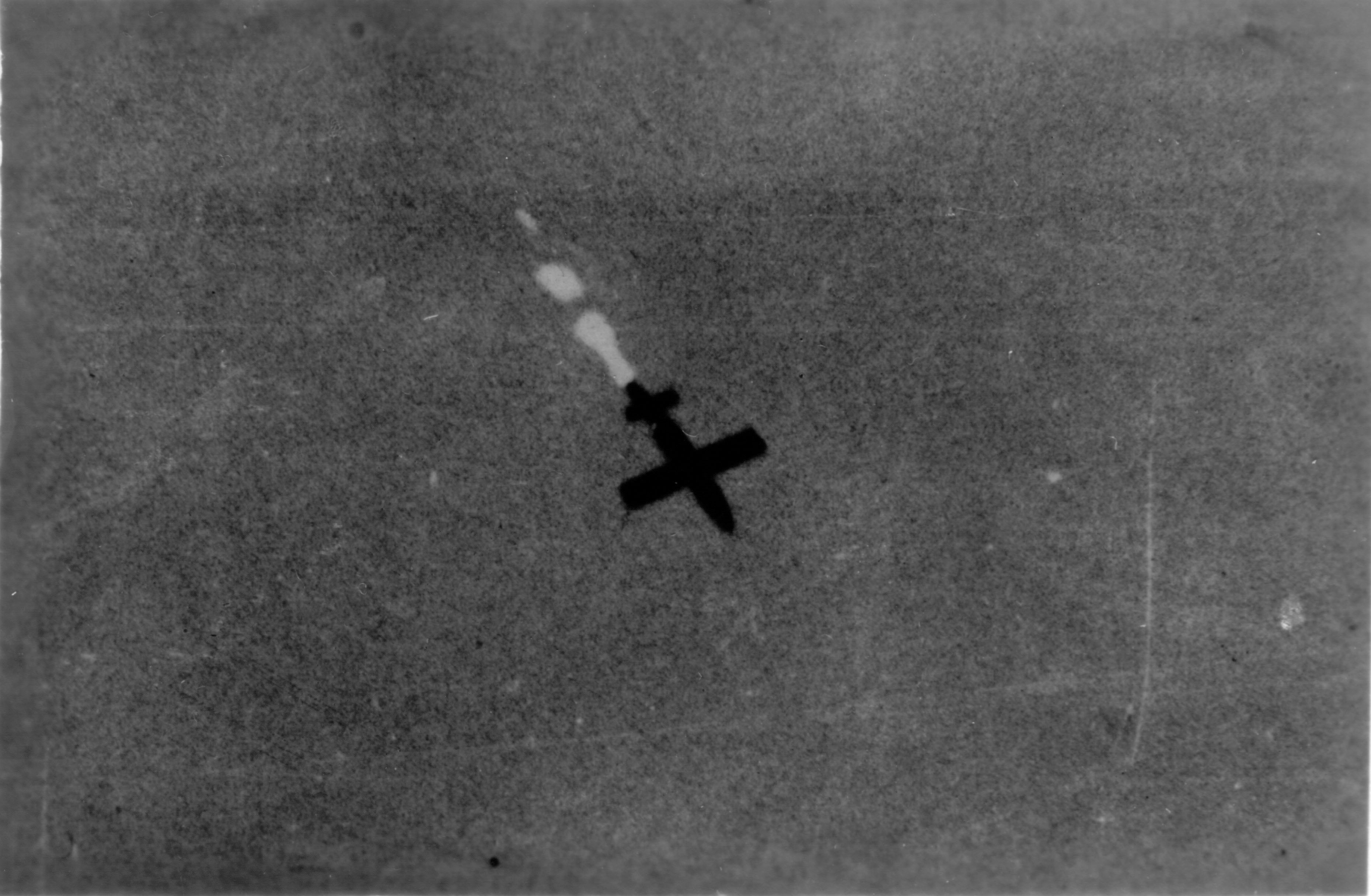
V-1 in flight over Antwerp

- 103 HAA Rgt
- 105 HAA Rgt
- 116 HAA Rgt
- 132 (Mixed) HAA Rgt
- 137 (Mixed) HAA Rgt
- 139 (Mixed) HAA Rgt
- 4 LAA Rgt
- 73 LAA Rgt (less one Bty)
- 41 (5th North Staffords) S/L Rgt (one Bty)

The HAA units were using the new No 10 Predictor (the Bell Labs AAA Computer) and No 3 Radar combination. The Mixed units arrived from England with static Mark IIC 3.7-inch guns equipped for powered gunlaying, loading and fuze-setting, all operated remotely from the No 10 predictor. This fire-control system provided complete automation of the process of engagement, apart from ammunition supply, and had proved very successful against V-1s in Air Defence of Great Britain's Operation Diver.

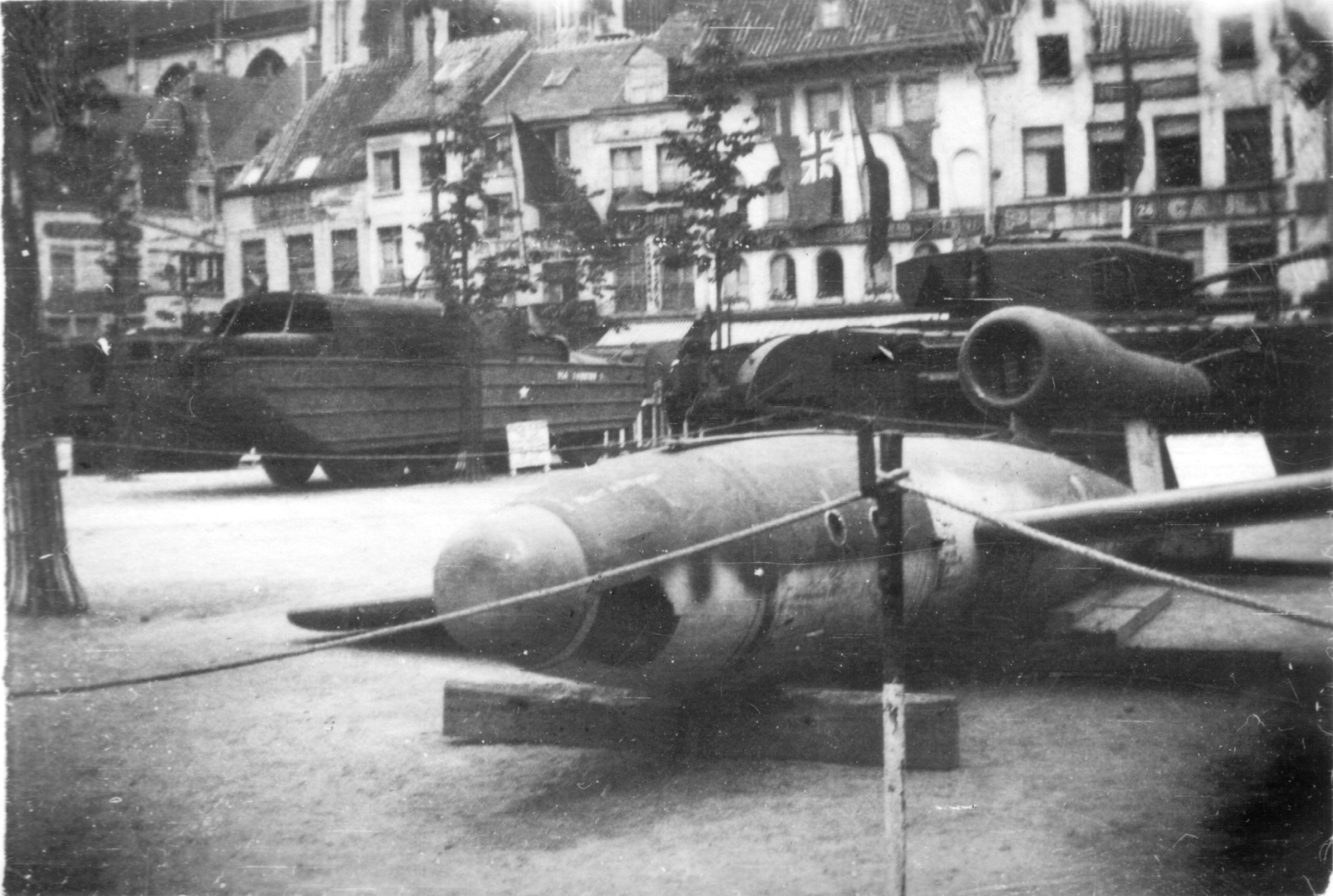
Captured V-1 displayed at Antwerp at the end of the war

50th Searchlight Brigade took over units in the Brussels 'X' Defences under GHQ AA Troops in March 1945, but by the end of the month there was no serious threat remaining to the city, and the brigade began to withdraw the AA units. In April the brigade closed up to the Scheldt defences, where torpedo boats, midget submarines and aircraft dropping Parachute mines in the approaches to Antwerp Docks and the Ghent canal were still a problem. At the end of the month, just before hostilities ended on VE Day, 50th AA Bde's composition was as follows:

- 155 (Mixed) HAA Rgt
- 150 (Loyals) LAA Rgt (formerly 62 (Loyals) S/L Rgt)
- 1 Independent LAA/SL Bty
- 7 Bty, 1 S/L Rgt
- 411 Bty, 54 (Durham Light Infantry) S/L Rgt

On 12 May all AA positions in 21st Army Group were ordered to stand down, but this did not at first apply to those in coastal positions such as the Scheldt, because of uncertainty about the intentions of German naval units still at sea when the surrender was signed.

50 AA Brigade was placed in suspended animation in British Army of the Rhine on 9 March 1946.

== Postwar ==
When the TA was reconstituted on 1 January 1947, 50th AA Bde was reformed as 76 Anti-Aircraft Brigade, which had no connection with the disbanded wartime 76th AA Bde. The reformed brigade had its HQ at Leicester and formed part of 5 AA Group once more. It had the following units subordinated to it:

- 522 LAA Rgt at Leamington Spa
- 527 LAA Rgt at Leicester
- 579 (The Royal Leicestershire Regiment) LAA Rgt at Leicester
- 585 (Northamptonshire Regiment) LAA/SL Rgt (the former 50th S/L Rgt) at Northampton

In 1950, some of these units underwent amalgamations, and the Brigade HQ was disbanded, completing on 14 November.

== Insignia ==
In July 1940, 50 AA Bde adopted as its sign 'a full moon', painted on vehicles along with the 2nd AA Divisional sign of 'a witch on a broomstick'.

== External sources ==
- The Royal Artillery 1939–45
- British Military History
- Orders of Battle at Patriot Files
- British Army units from 1945 on
- Graham Watson, The Territorial Army 1947
