= 84th Searchlight Regiment, Royal Artillery =

84th Searchlight Regiment, RA
- Royal Artillery cap badge
- Active: 20 December 1940 – 15 October 1943
- Country: United Kingdom
- Branch: British Army
- Type: Searchlight Regiment
- Role: Air Defence
- Size: 3–4 Batteries
- Part of: Anti-Aircraft Command
- Engagements: Hull Blitz

The 84th Searchlight Regiment (84th S/L Rgt) was an air defence unit of the British Army's Royal Artillery during World War II. It protected Humberside and the North Midlands of England as part of Anti-Aircraft Command from the Blitz of 1940 until it was disbanded in 1943.

== Origin ==
90 cm 'Projector Anti-Aircraft', displayed at Fort Nelson, Hampshire.

The regiment was created during the rapid expansion of anti-aircraft (AA) defences during The Blitz. Regimental Headquarters (RHQ) was formed at Hereford on 20 December 1940 and it was allocated four searchlight (S/L) batteries: 512, transferred from 64th (Essex Regiment) S/L Rgt, and three new batteries, 517, 518 and 519, formed on 15 October. The new regiment was assigned to 39th AA Brigade on Humberside, part of 10th AA Division.

== The Blitz ==
Formation sign of 10th AA Division.

On 12 January 1941 the regiment moved into 39th AA Bde's area with 517, 518 and 519 S/L Btys. The Brigade's operation order for the move (7 January) commented that 'These Btys have had little training in practical S/L work' and distributed them to double-man S/L sites alongside the experienced 30th (Surrey) S/L Rgt:

- 517/84 Bty alongside 315/30 Bty; Battery HQ (BHQ) at Militia Camp, Gainsborough, Lincolnshire
- 518/84 Bty alongside 316/30 Bty; BHQ at Militia Camp, Hatfield Woodhouse, West Yorkshire
- 519/84 Bty alongside 318/30 Bty; BHQ at Netherfield House, near Worksop, Nottinghamshire
- 512 S/L Bty (BHQ at The Wheatsheaf, Ely Road, Chatteris, Cambridgeshire) in 40th AA Bde area, was regimented with 84th S/L Rgt from 12 January, but remained in its location for a while before joining 323/30 Bty

By the time 84th S/L Rgt joined, the Blitz was in full swing, with frequent night air raids on the industrial cities. The role of the S/L units was to track and illuminate raiders for the Heavy AA (HAA) guns of the Gun Defence Areas (GDAs) and for the few available Royal Air Force Night fighters. In November 1940 AA Command had adopted a system of clustering three S/Ls together to improve illumination, but this meant that the clusters had to be spaced 10,400 yards (9,500 m) apart. This layout was an attempt to improve the chances of picking up enemy bombers and keeping them illuminated for engagement by AA guns or night fighters. Eventually, one light in each cluster was to be equipped with Searchlight Control radar (SLC) and act as 'master light', but the radar equipment was still in short supply.

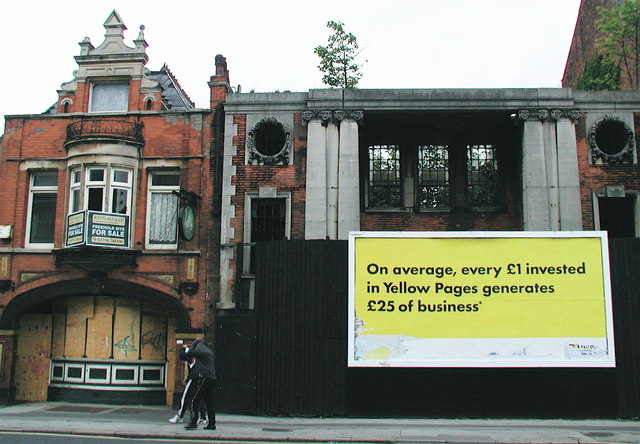
The National Picture Theatre on Beverley Road, burnt out during the Hull Blitz, now a listed building as a memorial to the events.

=== Hull Blitz ===
The Luftwaffe carried out regular night raids on the towns along the Humber and the nearby airfields. Hull was attacked by waves of aircraft on 25/26 February, with some damage and casualties. A more serious raid on 13/14 March left many fires burning and numerous casualties, and RAF fighter and bomber stations were attacked the following night. 30th (Surrey) S/L Rgt left the area on 23 March and 84th S/L Rgt's crews took over the sites they had been double-manning. 512 S/L Battery took over the northern sites and the regiment also assumed responsibility for 511 S/L Bty from 58th (Middlesex) S/L Rgt, which had been attached to 30th S/L Rgt. This battery was replaced by 370 S/L Bty from 43rd (5th Duke of Wellington's Regiment) S/L Rgt on 12 May.

On 31 March/1 April large numbers of enemy aircraft crossed the Humber GDA and bombed the centre of the city. However, the most intense period of raiding (the Hull Blitz) occurred from 3 to 9 May. Many of the plotted raids flew straight on to bomb Liverpool, but several dropped their bombs on Hull as a secondary target. Fires started on 7/8 May drew enemy aircraft to the target, and many of the bombs were large Parachute mines that caused widespread damage and many casualties across the city. Three further waves of bombers attacked the still-burning city the following night. Three or four aircraft were shot down on each night by AA guns or fighters cooperating with S/Ls. The Blitz is generally considered to have ended on 12 May, but there was another significant raid on Hull on 28/29 May, mainly minelaying that caused the Humber to be closed to shipping for some time. The bombers were engaged by the Humber guns, night fighters, and the Light machine guns manned by the S/L detachments.

Even after the main Blitz ended, Hull was an easy target for inexperienced Luftwaffe crews and was frequently bombed and mined. 84th and 40th (Sherwood Foresters) S/L Regiments redistributed their lights at the end of July to increase their coverage south of the Humber. 84th took over six sites (18 S/Ls) as a temporary 'Firework' Battery (with a skeleton BHQ at 'The Elms', Ulceby, North Lincolnshire) to try to pick up German aircraft dropping mines into the Humber. A special S/L 'Dazzle Barrage' installed at Hull foiled at least one attack, in August 1941.

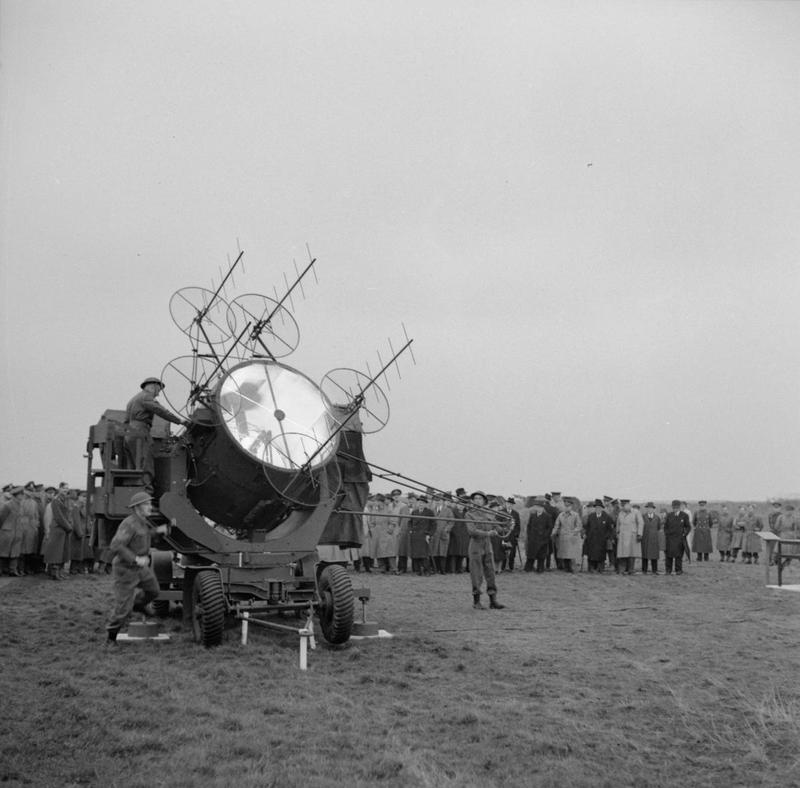
150 cm Searchlight fitted with No. 2 Mk VI SLC radar.

== Mid-War ==
By October 1941 the availability of SLC was sufficient to allow AA Command's S/L sites to be 'declustered' into single-light sites spaced at 6,000 yards (5,500 m) intervals in 'Indicator Belts' in the approaches to the GDAs, and 'Killer Belts' at 6,000 yards (5,500 m) spacing to cooperate with the RAF's night fighters. This meant that 39th AA Bde was able to spread out its S/L sites, and 84th S/L Rgt relinquished 370 S/L Bty on 11 November.

On 21 April 1942 39th AA Bde was reorganised as a Light AA brigade, handing over its HAA commitments to 65th AA Bde while retaining its Light AA and S/L units. At this time RHQ of 84th S/L Rgt was at Worksop. The Luftwaffe began its so-called Baedeker Blitz in April 1942: an attack was launched against Hull on 19 May, but a fire kindled by incendiary bombs landing on an AA site outside the city distracted the bombers from their target. Another raid on 31 July was almost as ineffective.

In June 43rd S/L Rgt relieved 84th S/L Rgt from nine sites it was manning in the Leeds GDA to allow it to re-occupy sites in the Humber (under 40th S/L Rgt) and Sheffield GDAs that had been abandoned during clustering. A number of the anti-mine sites along the South Humber shore were now given up. But the likelihood of further Baedeker raids meant that 84th S/L Rgt's crews manning the S/L 'Canopy' at RAF Hibaldstow were ordered to be ready to move at short notice to sites covering Sheffield (the code word for the move, given Sheffield's steel heritage, would be 'Cutlery').

At this time the regiment, under the command of Lieutenant-Colonel G. Howson, was distributed as follows:

- RHQ at Netherfield House, Worksop
- 512 S/L BHQ at Thrybergh Park, near Rotherham
- 517 S/L BHQ at Horton House, Gainsborough
- 518 S/L BHQ and 84th S/L Rgt School at Militia Camp, Hatfield
- 519 S/L BHQ at Sparkon House, Worksop

A reorganisation of AA Command in October 1942 saw the AA divisions disbanded and replaced by a smaller number of AA Groups more closely aligned with the groups of RAF Fighter Command. Thus 10th AA Division merged with 2nd AA Division to form 5 AA Group based at Nottingham and affiliated to No. 12 Group RAF.

5 AA Group carried out a major reorganisation of its S/L layout in January and February 1943. As a result, 84th S/L Rgt came under 50th AA Bde in the North Midlands, with 517 S/L Bty attached to 32nd (Midland) AA Bde.

== Disbandment ==
With the lower threat of attack by the weakened Luftwaffe, AA Command was forced to release manpower for the planned invasion of Normandy (Operation Overlord). All Home Defence S/L regiments were reduced, and some like 84th were run down altogether. 518 S/L Battery transferred to 2nd S/L Rgt on 16 September, and 517 S/L Bty disbanded on 2 October. The final disbandment date for the rest of 84th Searchlight Regiment was 15 October 1943.

On 1 April 1947, 2nd S/L Rgt was redesignated 84 S/L Rgt, but it passed into suspended animation on 16 September 1948.
