= K (Hondeghem) Battery Royal Artillery =

British Army artillery battery

K (Hondeghem) Battery RA
- Active: 4 August 1809 – present
- Country: United Kingdom
- Allegiance: Hon East India Coy (till 1858); United Kingdom (post 1858)
- Branch: British Army
- Type: Artillery
- Role: Surveillance and Target Acquisition
- Size: battery
- Part of: 5th Regiment Royal Artillery
- Location: Catterick Garrison
- Nickname: 'Shiney K'
- Anniversaries: Hondeghem Day - 27 May
- Equipment: TAIPAN
- Decorations: Hondeghem
- Battle honours: Ubique

K (Hondeghem) Battery is a battery of 5th Regiment Royal Artillery in the Royal Artillery. It currently serves in the Surveillance and Target Acquisition role and is equipped with TAIPAN, a type of weapon locating radar.

== History ==
K Battery was formed by the East India Company as 2nd Troop Bengal Horse Artillery on 4 August 1809 in Acra, India, with the majority of the other ranks being British. This fact and that the battery were all mounted to ensure greater manoeuvrability, was unusual during this period. During the next 100 years the battery came under command of the Bengal Horse Artillery then the Royal Horse Artillery and is now under command of the Royal Artillery.

In 1939, K Battery was the last Royal Horse Artillery battery to be mechanised.

At outbreak of the Second World War, K Battery was the current Riding Troop at St John's Wood, and the battery joined 5th RHA, serving alongside G Battery, as part of the British Expeditionary Force during the Fall of France, consisting of D, E and F Troops. It was during the retreat to Dunkirk in 1940 with the British Expeditionary Force, that the battery gained its honour title. With the BEF retreating towards the Belgian coast as the German forces streamed through Belgium, the small village of Hondeghem lay on one of the Germans' main lines of advance and it became essential to hold it. However, the only troops available were K Battery and a detachment of one officer and 80 men of the 2nd Searchlight Regiment, Royal Artillery.

The battery was armed with First World War Mark II 18-pounder guns which had been modernised by the fitting of road wheels and pneumatic tyres. Two of the guns of 'F' Troop were situated inside the village and the other two on the outskirts of the village. At about 07:30 on the morning of the 27 May the enemy, in the form of 6th Panzer Division, appeared and were engaged by the two outer guns. These guns destroyed several enemy vehicles and two or three tanks as they approached. An enemy tank closed on gun of J Sub Section firing its machine gun, the number 2 was killed. The tank then fired its main armament and scored a direct hit killing another member of the detachment and wounding Gunner Manning and Troop Sergeant Major Opie. Small arms fire poured into the gun pit wounding Gunner Manning again, but he gallantly insisted on remaining in action. The enemy tank was then engaged by the gun of I Sub Section just before it was destroyed while enemy infantry dashed in and captured the last few men of J Sub Section. Gunner Manning was taken to hospital by the Germans but died later of his injuries.

The battle then surged into the streets of the village, with continuous, violent and sometimes confused street fighting was carried out for the next eight hours. The two remaining guns kept firing throughout at a very reduced range, as the Germans tried to establish machine guns in the upper windows of the houses. Throughout the day, as the battle continued, the guns were constantly being moved to fresh targets firing at 100 yards or less, but by 3pm the gun ammunition began running short, so the artillerymen used their rifles to fire at any Germans who showed their heads. Then at 4:15pm it was decided to try to save the last two guns and the survivors of the small force headed towards St Sylvestre, where the village was found to be occupied by the Germans with both infantry and medium tanks. It was now that the troop commander decided that the best course of action was to charge the enemy without delay. So at his command every man shouted at the top of their voice and assaulted the German position. The Germans lost their nerve and ran. After firing what little ammunition they had into the surrounding countryside, the little column resumed its retreat.

The battery had suffered heavy losses, with 'F' Troop alone losing 45 men out of 63. However, they were rewarded with Major Hoare being awarded the D.S.O., Captain Teacher the M.C., Battery Sergeant Major Millard receiving the D.C.M., and Gunner Kavanagh was honoured with the M.M. In addition three men were Mentions-In-Despatches.

After evacuation at Dunkirk the battery was rebuilt, with men from it going to help form CC Battery, as part of the re-organisation of the Royal Artillery, with the battery consisting of D and E/F Troops. It then, served along with G Battery and CC Battery, in 5th RHA, originally sailing to the Middle East as part of 8th Armoured Division, before 5 RHA joined 7th Armoured Division. It served in North Africa, Italy and North West Europe.

== See also ==
- British Army
- Royal Artillery
- Royal Horse Artillery
- List of Royal Artillery Batteries
- Bengal Horse Artillery Batteries

== Bibliography ==
- Clarke, W.G. (1993). Horse Gunners: The Royal Horse Artillery, 200 Years of Panache and Professionalism. Woolwich: The Royal Artillery Institution. ISBN 09520762-0-9.
