= 2nd Searchlight Regiment, Royal Artillery =

2nd Anti-Aircraft Battalion, RE 2nd Searchlight Regiment, RA 84 Searchlight Regiment, RA
- Royal Artillery cap badge
- Active: 24 May 1938 – 7 October 1948
- Country: United Kingdom
- Branch: British Army
- Type: Searchlight
- Role: Air Defence
- Size: 3–4 Batteries
- Part of: British Expeditionary Force; Anti-Aircraft Command; 21st Army Group
- Engagements: Battle of France; Battle of Arras; Battle of Boulogne; Siege of Calais; Action at Hondeghem; Operation Dynamo; Operation Aerial; North West Europe; Defence of the Scheldt; Operation Plunder; Crossing of the Weser; Operation Enterprise

The 2nd Searchlight Regiment was an air defence unit of Britain's Royal Artillery, formed just before World War II. Deploying to France with the British Expeditionary Force and RAF Advanced Air Striking Force in 1940, it found itself caught up in ground fighting during the Battle of France, including actions at Arras, Boulogne, Calais, and Hondeghem. After the evacuation from Dunkirk it served in home defence in Anti-Aircraft Command until 1944, when it deployed to Europe again, seeing action in the defence of Antwerp and the Scheldt, then the river crossings as 21st Army Group advanced into Germany at the end of the war. It was disbanded in 1948.

== Origin ==
During the 1930s the growing threat of air attack led to the rapid expansion of the British Army's anti-aircraft (AA) units. At that time AA searchlights (S/Ls) were operated by the Royal Engineers (RE). The 2nd AA Battalion, RE, was formed in 1937 with two companies designated A and B. By 1938 it had been decided that the S/L responsibility should be transferred to the Royal Artillery (RA). On 24 May 1938 the 2nd AA Bn was disbanded and replaced by 2nd Searchlight Regiment, RA with A and B batteries. It was formed at Portsmouth and the first commanding officer (CO) was Lieutenant-Colonel T.R. Anderson, MC, who had seen active service on the Western Front and in Mesopotamia during World War I.

== World War II ==
=== Mobilisation ===
The regiment was stationed at Portsmouth in Southern Command on the outbreak of war. It sailed for France to join the British Expeditionary Force (BEF) on 1 January 1940 and was initially deployed in the Airaines area with Regimental Headquarters (RHQ) at Fruges. It was reported that the weather was so cold that 'the vehicles had to be kept running all night to prevent them from freezing up'.

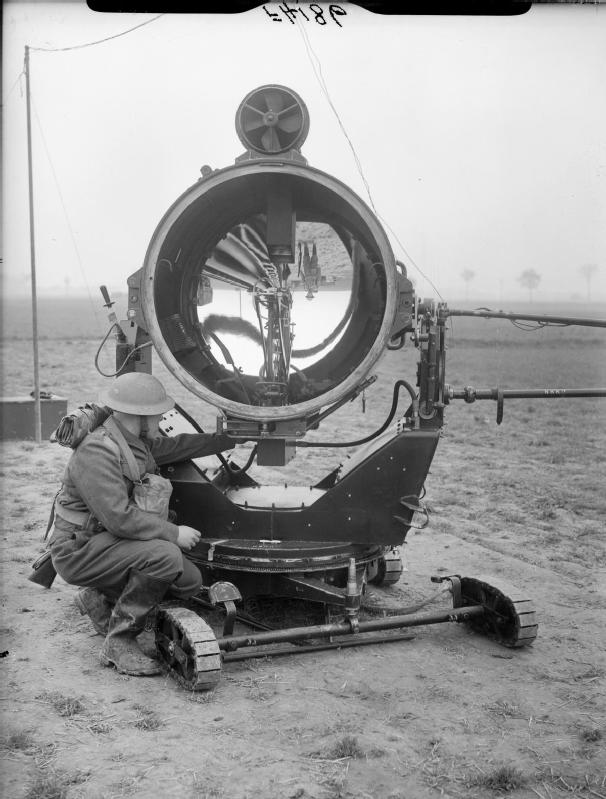
A 90 cm Searchlight of the Royal Artillery in France, May 1940.

During February, A and B S/L Btys were joined by two newly formed ones, 6 and 475, though during the coming campaign the four were designated 5, 6, 7 and 8, even if this change did not officially take effect until July. The establishment of a S/L battery at this time was four Troops each of six 'projectors', giving a total of 24 per battery. Each S/L site was also equipped with Light machine guns (LMGs, usually Lewis guns) for local defence. The regiment came under 5th S/L Brigade when that was formed in February, with 5 S/L Bty detached to Boulogne. 8 S/L Battery (as well as 9 S/L Bty of 3rd (Ulster) S/L Rgt) was supporting two batteries of 2nd Heavy AA Rgt in the Arras Gun Defence Area (GDA) On 14 April the regiment was ordered to send 7 S/L Bty to Rheims to join 12th AA Brigade supporting the RAF Advanced Air Striking Force (AASF).

Battle of France, situation map 21 May–4 June.

=== Battle of France ===
When the Phoney War ended with the German invasion of the Low Countries on 10 May, 2nd AA Rgt was scattered across Northern France: some troops were 90 miles (140 km) from their battery HQ (BHQ) and even further from RHQ. They took part in defending against the Luftwaffe's initial attacks while the BEF advanced into Belgium in accordance with Plan D, but the German Army broke through the Ardennes to the east, forcing the BEF to withdraw again. As Army Group A cut the BEF's lines of communication into France and drove it back towards the coast at Dunkirk, 2nd S/L Rgt's subunits found themselves involved in ground fighting and rearguard actions. On 19 May Arras was threatened and the BEF was forced to improvise a number of defence groups: RHQ of 2nd S/L Rgt took on the ground defence of the town with a mixture of troops under command during the Battle of Arras. Meanwhile, the S/L units at airfields were given additional LMGs to defend against low-flying daylight attacks.

Two Troops of 8 S/L Bty had been defending Conteville and Crécy airfields with 210 AA By of 73rd AA Rgt under 2nd AA Bde when the German forces took nearby Péronne. On 20 May they were ordered to move south-west to Rouen to come under 3rd AA Bde. However, 2nd Panzer Division was already in Abbeville blocking the way, and they had to fight a rearguard action with enemy ground troops to get to the coast and make it back to Dunkirk.

==== Boulogne ====
When planning the defence of Dunkirk as a possible evacuation port, the BEF's commanders decided that Boulogne and Calais should still be held as supply points for further fighting or possible exit points for a final withdrawal. Their AA defences were therefore strengthened. At Boulogne there were a battery of HAA guns, two LAA troops with LMGs, and 5 S/L Bty manning S/Ls and LMGs. Two battalions from 20th Guards Brigade arrived by sea on 22 May and took on the perimeter defence, joined by detachments from 5 S/L Bty. The Battle of Boulogne began with an attack by 40–50 aircraft on the harbour, which was engaged by all the AA sites who achieved a number of hits. This was followed by an attack by 2nd Panzer Division against several points on the perimeter, which drove the Guards and S/L detachments back by stages into the town. Meanwhile, non-combat troops and wounded were being evacuated and demolitions were carried out. On the evening of 23 May 20 Guards Bde was ordered to evacuate and the remaining troops, including the AA survivors, closed in to form a tight perimeter. On 25 May the French troops manning the old fortifications gave up and German infantry penetrated to the quayside, overrunning the last strongpoints. Only a party of 5 S/L Bty got out, making its way along the beaches to Calais.

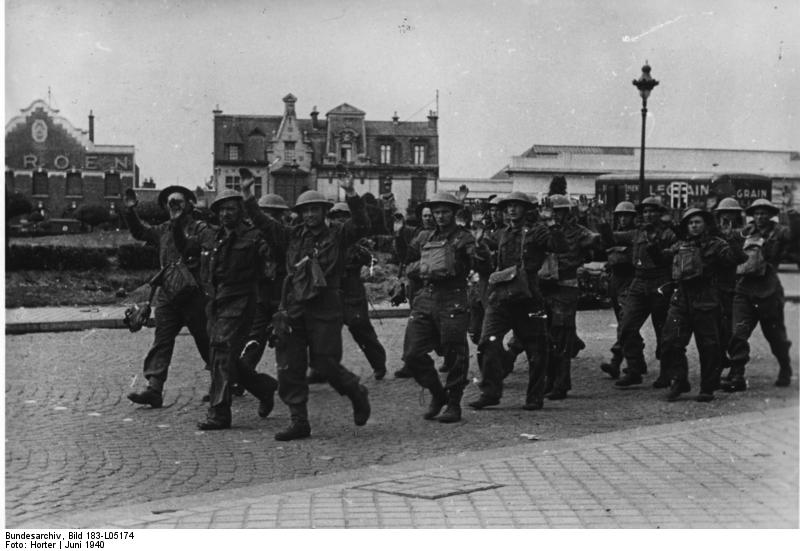
British prisoners being marched away after the fall of Calais, 26 May 1940

==== Calais ====
The story was repeated in the Siege of Calais. 1st S/L Regiment was stationed there, and the 1st Bn Queen Victoria's Rifles (QVR), the lead unit of 30th Infantry Brigade, arrived by sea on 22 May, just before advanced German troops began probing the defences. The town was bombed by Luftwaffe raiders that night but ground attack was now the biggest danger, and the S/L men had to man the perimeter as infantry. They were joined on 23 May by two officers and 230 other ranks from 2nd S/L Rgt. By 24 May the town was completely cut off and the first serious attacks came in against points on the perimeter. The S/L men put up a stout fight, engaging Panzer troops with LMGs and Boys anti-tank rifles (A/T rifles), but the perimeter was breached and 30th Bde's infantry and the S/L gunners were involved in close-quarter fighting and forced back to the citadel and the harbour. Many wounded and 'non-fighting' personnel were evacuated on the City of Canterbury and the Kohistan and a Flotilla of Destroyers. The AA Defence Commander allowed about 200 AA troops to leave, but ordered the remainder to stay and fight. Hundreds of 'non-fighting' men were left at the port and later in the dunes hoping for evacuation. The garrison held out in the citadel and port until 16.00 on 26 May. Most of the survivors became Prisoners of war (PoWs), although during the final stages and during the night of 26/27 May some of the defenders escaped or were picked up by boats. The three-day defence of Calais, holding up Heinz Guderian's XIX Panzerkorps, had provided some respite for the Dunkirk evacuation (Operation Dynamo), which was now under way.

==== Hondeghem ====
Among the units covering the BEF's retreat to Dunkirk was F Trp of K Bty, Royal Horse Artillery (RHA), equipped with four World War I-vintage 18-pounder guns and reinforced by 80 men from 2nd S/L Rgt. They held the village of Hondeghem during six hours of bitter street fighting beginning at 07.30 on 27 May. Although the two outer guns were quickly overwhelmed the other two in the village square were manhandled round corners to engage tanks and infantry at close range while the other RHA and S/L gunners fought with rifles, LMGs and a few A/T rifles. The other troop of K Bty brought down accurate shellfire from a nearby hill until three of its four guns were hit. About 15.30 ammunition began to run out, though the gunners with rifles kept the Germans' heads down until at 14.15 the survivors broke out to St Sylvestre, 2 miles (3.2 km) miles away. The Germans were already in this village, but the assorted gunners, together with some drivers of the Royal Army Service Corps, charged them, driving them off, and then got away in whatever vehicles were still running. (Note: K Bty, RHA, was later awarded the Honour title 'Hondeghem' for this action.)

==== Evacuations ====
Meanwhile, Lt-Col Anderson with RHQ, 8 S/L Bty and odd details of other batteries of 2nd S/L Rgt had fallen back from Arras to St Omer, where by 24 May they were deployed to defend the canal. Once relieved, this remnant withdrew through Herzeele and was concentrated at Les Moëres where it rested for the first time in five days, while Anderson went into Dunkirk to try to find news of his lost batteries. On 29/30 May this part of the regiment was evacuated from Dunkirk to Dover.

Even after the Dunkirk evacuation ended, a number of fighting formations and a large number of rear echelon units were still in France south of the River Somme, and fresh British forces were being landed at France's western ports. The AASF's remaining bombers flew back to the UK, while its fighters moved to Nantes to cover this new troop concentration. 12th AA Brigade set off though Vendôme, Le Mans and Rennes to Nantes, where its remaining HAA batteries and 7 S/L Bty (without searchlights), occupied positions on either side of the River Loire. But the situation in France was now beyond remedy, and the British government decided to evacuate its remaining troops from the Atlantic ports between 15 and 17 June (Operation Aerial).

Formation sign of 8th AA Division.

=== Home Defence ===
On their return to England the BEF's AA units were rapidly reinforced and re-equipped to take their places in Anti-Aircraft Command. From July 1940 the rebuilt 2nd S/L Rgt was stationed at Cranborne in East Dorset under the command of 64th AA Bde. This brigade's role was to provide S/L and Light AA (LAA) cover to Royal Air Force (RAF) airfields in South West England under 8th AA Division. The regiment was now organised with 4, 5, 6 and 475 S/L Btys; 4 Bty had transferred from the reformed 1st S/L Rgt in exchange for 7 Bty.

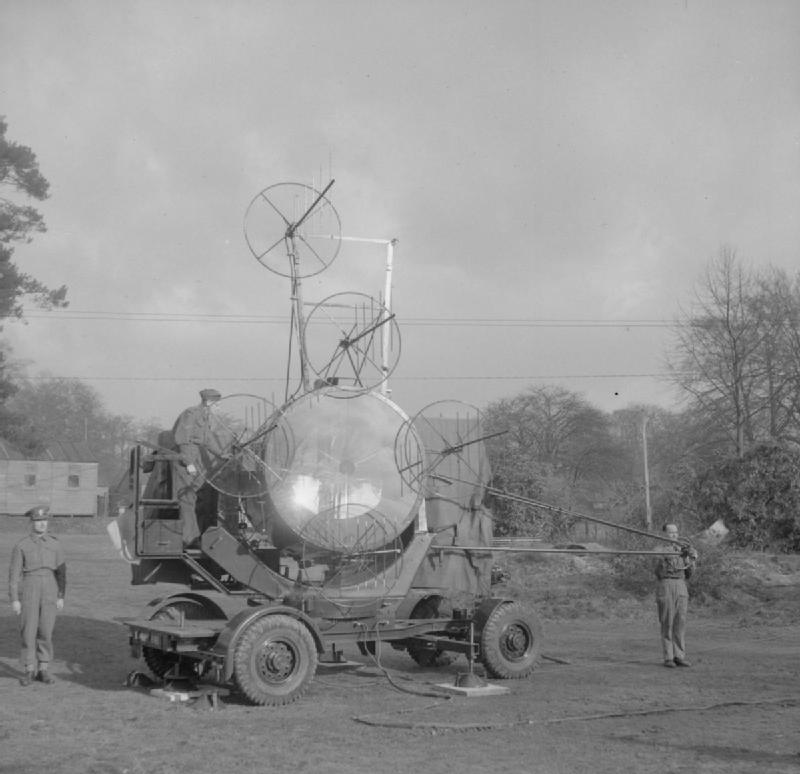
150 cm S/L with AA Radar No 2

The Battle of Britain was fought over Southern England in the summer of 1940, followed by the night-bombing Blitz of 1940–41. During this campaign AA Command adopted a S/L layout of clusters of three lights to improve illumination, but this meant that the clusters had to be spaced 10,400 yards (9,500 m) apart. The cluster system was an attempt to improve the chances of picking up enemy bombers and keeping them illuminated for engagement by AA guns or Night fighters. Eventually, one light in each cluster was to be equipped with Searchlight Control radar (SLC or 'Elsie') and act as 'master light', but the radar equipment was still in short supply. 64th AA Brigade's batteries were deployed in three-light clusters at RAF airfields, and as the Blitz was ending had begun to receive GL Mark I E/F gun-laying radar equipped with elevation-finding equipment. By the autumn of 1941 the brigade began to receive its first purpose-built SLC radar (AA Radar No 2) in sufficient numbers to allow the sites to be 'declustered' into single-light sites spaced at 6,000 yards (5,500 m) intervals in a 'Killer Belt' cooperating with RAF night fighters.

2nd S/L Regiment supplied a cadre of experienced officers and men to 230th S/L Training Rgt at Blandford Camp where it provided the basis for a new 554 S/L Bty formed on 13 February 1941. This battery later joined 82nd S/L Rgt. In June 1941 Lt-Col Anderson was promoted to Brigadier and took command of 32nd (Midland) AA Bde.

2nd S/L Regiment remained with 64th AA Bde, fulfilling its role with the RAF's airfields, for the whole middle part of the war. By 1943, with the lower threat of attack by the weakened Luftwaffe, AA Command was forced to release manpower for the planned invasion of Normandy (Operation Overlord). Many Home Defence S/L regiments were disbanded or converted to other roles. 84th S/L Rgt was one that was run down altogether, with RHQ and three batteries disbanding in September–October. The remaining battery, 518 S/L Bty, was transferred to 2nd S/L Rgt on 16 September.

The pressure on AA Command to release manpower continued, and in February the S/L regiments were reduced again: 2nd S/L Rgt saw both 475 and 518 S/L Btys disbanded, D Trp of 475 completing by 3 March, the remainder by 24 March.

=== Overlord training ===
In the planning for 'Overlord', No. 85 Group RAF was to be responsible for night fighter cover of the beachhead and bases in Normandy after D Day, and was keen to have searchlight assistance in the same way as Fighter Command had in the UK. Two AA brigade HQs experienced in commanding searchlights were to be withdrawn from AA Command to join 21st Army Group's GHQ AA Troops for this purpose. A detailed plan was drawn up for a belt of S/L positions deployed from Caen to the Cherbourg peninsula. This required nine S/L batteries of 24 lights, spaced at 6,000 yards (5,500 m) intervals, six rows deep. Each battery area was to have an orbit beacon, around which up to four fighters would be positioned at varying heights. These would be allocated by fighter controllers, and the S/Ls would assist by illuminating targets and indicating raid approaches, while area boundaries would be marked by vertical S/Ls. 2nd S/L Regiment was one of six S/L regiments specially trained for this work, transferring from 64th to 50th S/L Bde for the operation. In practice, most of this plan was never implemented, liaison with the US Army units around Cherbourg having proved problematical once they were on the ground. 50th S/L Bde therefore remained in AA Command, waiting to cross to Normandy until long after D-Day.

=== North West Europe ===
==== Scheldt ====
2nd S/L regiment left Cranborne in August 1944 to prepare to join 21st Army Group. It finally arrived in the North West Europe theatre when it joined 76th AA Bde at Antwerp on 17 November, with its batteries ready for action by 20 November. Its primary task was to line the north bank of the Scheldt Estuary to cooperate with LAA guns against aircraft dropping parachute mines into the waterway and blocking the port, for which 6 S/L Bty was detached to 5th (Royal Marine) AA Bde in the port itself. It also provided four S/Ls for Walcheren, which had recently been captured by the First Canadian Army in Operation Infatuate.

There was little air activity over the Scheldt to begin with (though Antwerp city was being bombarded by V-1 flying bombs, some of which were engaged by 76 AA Bde), but the Luftwaffe became active during the German Ardennes Offensive (the Battle of the Bulge) in December, culminating in Operation Bodenplatte against Allied airfields on 1 January 1945. A night raid on Ostend and the Scheldt on the night of 26/27 December, for instance, returned over Antwerp, where 6 S/L Bty succeeded in illuminating some Junkers Ju 88s and Messerschmitt Me 262s; one crashed and the Walcheren S/Ls were awarded the 'kill'. In early January, 2nd S/L Rgt deployed pairs of 90 mm S/Ls to support Bofors 40 mm LAA guns operating in a coast artillery (CA) role at Wemeldinge and Westkapelle to counter Biber miniature submarines attempting to enter the Scheldt estuary.

In late 1 January S/L Rgt arrived to take over 2nd S/L Rgt's commitments and the regiment completed its move out of 76th AA Bde's area on 25 January. In 21 February Army Group began Operation Veritable to clear the Reichswald up to the Rhine. For this, 6 S/L Bty operated under 74th AA Bde supporting II Canadian Corps. From now on, the regiment's batteries tended to be deployed singly according to operational needs.

During the campaign from Normandy to the Rhine, culminating in 'Veritable', the S/L units of 21st Army Group had developed the technique of 'artificial moonlight' to assist the ground troops. Now, in preparation for the assault crossing of the Rhine (Operation Plunder), some of these were being converted into Moonlight Batteries, Royal Artillery. On 28 February 344 Independent S/L Bty was split into 344 and 581 Moonlight Btys, and 2nd S/L Rgt was among the units that provided the additional personnel for this expansion.

==== Rhine ====
The build-up of troops and supplies for Operation Plunder required largescale AA defences, extending back to cover vital bridges and routes. 107th AA Brigade arrived on 18 March to protect the Cleve, Gennep and Mook bridges behind II Canadian Corps, including 6 S/L Bty. One troop of 6 S/L Bty moved up to the Rhine, where the Canadians were to make a follow-up crossing. Meanwhile 5 S/L Bty was assigned in the AA role to 106th AA Bde with XXX Corps making the assault crossing at Rees. 'Plunder' was launched on the night of 23/24 March and made good progress, the RE quickly getting to work on bridge building. After dark on 24 March scattered Ju 88s began making divebombing attacks on the bridging sites, artillery areas and supply routes. The number of attacks was not large: 106th AA Bde reported 20-plus Ju 88s, some of which were illuminated by the S/Ls and engaged by the HAA and LAA guns with some successes. There were 30 or more raids the following night, against bridging and S/L sites, and the S/Ls were again effective in picking up attackers for the guns. The story was repeated on 26/27 March, 106th AA Bde's guns engaging attackers with the help of S/Ls and radar. By now the bridges over the Rhine were completed and in use, and as the fighting moved deeper into Germany the number of air attacks diminished, though 5 S/L Bty remained on duty on both sides of the Rees crossing.

==== Germany ====
While most of 2nd S/L Rgt remained with 74th AA Bde on guard duties behind the First Canadian Army, 106th AA Brigade handed over its units (including 5 S/L Bty) to 100th AA Bde, which moved up to cover the Second Army's crossing of the Weser on 9–11 April, followed by the crossing of the Elbe (Operation Enterprise) on 29 April, when the Luftwaffe put in its last effort to prevent the crossing. The German surrender at Lüneburg Heath followed on 4 May and all AA action was immediately suspended. The AA units were then turned to occupation duties, with 100th AA Bde responsible for Hamburg.

== Postwar ==
On 1 April 1947, 2nd S/L Rgt was redesignated 84 Searchlight Regiment (taking the number of the wartime unit whose remaining battery had joined 2nd S/L Rgt when it was disbanded in 1943) and the batteries were redesignated 230, 231 and 239. The regiment formed part of 16 AA Bde in AA Command's 5 AA Group in North East England. However, the regiment and its batteries began to enter suspended animation on 16 September 1948 at Holt, Norfolk, completing the process by 7 October.

== Memorial ==
In St Mary and St Bartholomew Church in Cranborne, Dorset, there is a memorial board with the following text:

'TO RECORD WITH PRIDE AND GRATITUDE/ THEIR ASSOCIATION WITH THIS CHURCH/ AND VILLAGE THIS TABLET IS PLACED HERE/ BY THE OFFICERS AND MEN OF THE SECOND/ SEARCHLIGHT REGIMENT, ROYAL ARTILLERY,/ WHICH SERVED IN AND AROUND CRANBORNE FROM JULY 1940 UNTIL AUGUST 1944 & IN PROUD MEMORY OF BRIGADIER THURGAR ROLLAND ANDERSON MC WHO RAISED THE REGIMENT ON 24TH MAY 1939 (sic) AND COMMANDED IT AT HOME AND OVERSEAS UNTIL JUNE 1941. HE DIED ON ACTIVE SERVICE ON 7TH AUGUST 1943' (Note: Brigadier Anderson died while in command of 32nd (Midland) AA Bde.)
