= Huddersfield Rifles =

Former battalion of the British Army

Huddersfield Rifles 5th Bn Duke of Wellington's Regiment 43rd Searchlight Regiment, RA 600th Infantry Regiment, RA 578 Heavy AA Regiment, RA
- Active: 3 November 1859 – 1 April 1967
- Country: United Kingdom
- Branch: Territorial Army
- Role: Infantry; Air Defence
- Garrison/HQ: Huddersfield
- Engagements: World War I: Battle of the Somme; Battle of Arras; Battle of Poelcappelle; Battle of Cambrai; German spring offensive; Battle of Tardenois; Second Battle of Bapaume; Battle of the Drocourt-Quéant Line; Battle of Havrincourt; Battle of the Canal du Nord; Battle of the Selle; Battle of the Sambre; World War II: The Blitz; North West Europe

The Huddersfield Rifles was a unit of Britain's Volunteer Force first raised in 1859. It later became a battalion of the Duke of Wellington's Regiment in the Territorial Army, serving as infantry on the Western Front in World War I and as an air defence unit during and after World War II.

== Origin ==
An invasion scare in 1859 led to the creation of the Volunteer Force and huge enthusiasm for joining local Rifle Volunteer Corps (RVCs). The services of a corps at Huddersfield were accepted by the Lord Lieutenant of the West Riding of Yorkshire on 3 November 1859, when it was assigned the number 10, but by July 1860 it had become the 6th Yorkshire West Riding Rifle Volunteer Corps, with four companies. The title 'The Huddersfield' was added in 1868. It became the senior unit of the 5th Administrative Battalion of West Yorkshire RVCs when that was formed at Huddersfield on 18 September 1862 with the following organisation (dates are for first officers' commissions):

- 6th (The Huddersfield) Yorkshire West Riding RVC at Huddersfield 24 February 1860
- 32nd Yorkshire West Riding RVC at Holmfirth 2 June 1860
- 34th (Saddleworth) Yorkshire West Riding RVC at Saddleworth 10 September 1860, joined 5th Admin Bn in 1877
- 41st Yorkshire West Riding RVC at Mirfield 15 March 1869
- 44th Yorkshire West Riding RVC at Meltham 29 August 1868, disbanded 1875.

The annual inspection of the battalion was a major social event: two or three thousand people attended the 1869 parade, when the Huddersfield Rifles, Holmfirth Volunteers, and Mirfield and Meltham Companies were inspected, and the Saddleworth Volunteers 'kept the ground' with the police. Later, the Huddersfield Rifles had a prizewinning brass band.

On 1 June 1880 the 5th Admin Bn was consolidated as a new 6th Yorkshire West Riding RVC with the following organisation:

- A, B, C & D Companies at Huddersfield (ex-6th RVC)
- E Company at Holmfirth (ex-32nd RVC)
- F, G, H & J Companies at Saddleworth (ex-34th RVC)
- K Company at Mirfield (ex-41st RVC)
- An additional company was formed in Huddersfield in 1900.

== Duke of Wellington's Regiment ==
Cap badge of the Duke of Wellington's Regiment

On 1 July 1881, as part of the Childers Reforms, the corps became a Volunteer Battalion of the Duke of Wellington's (West Riding) Regiment and on 1 February 1883 was designated as the 2nd Volunteer Battalion of the regiment. At this time, battalion headquarters was at The Armoury in Ramsden Street, Huddersfield. The uniform had been scarlet with sky blue facing, but the facings were changed to the standard white by 1887. Under the mobilisation scheme introduced by the Stanhope Memorandum of December 1888 the units of the Volunteer Force were assigned to either garrisons or mobile brigades. The Volunteer Battalions of the Duke of Wellington's were assigned to the West Yorkshire Volunteer Infantry Brigade in Northern Command and in the event of war were expected to mobilise at Leeds.

== Boer War ==
Volunteers from the battalion served in the 2nd Boer War, gaining the unit its first Battle Honour: South Africa 1900–02.

== Territorial Force ==
When the Territorial Force (TF) was formed under the Haldane Reforms in 1908, Volunteer Battalions were renumbered as battalions of their parent regiments. The 2nd Volunteer Battalion of the Duke of Wellington's formed two new battalions: the 5th Battalion at Huddersfield, and the 7th Battalion at Milnsbridge. The former West Yorkshire Brigade was split in two, and all four TF battalions of the battalions of the Duke of Wellington's Regiment composed the new 2nd West Riding Brigade in the West Riding Division.

== World War I ==
=== Mobilisation ===
At the end of July 1914, the units of the West Riding Division left for their annual training camps, but on 3–4 August the 2nd West Riding Brigade was ordered to its war stations, guarding coastal defences near Hull and Grimsby. On 5 November they were relieved and moved to billets in Doncaster, where the division formed part of Central Force of Home Defence, and began to train for active service.

Meanwhile, the formation of Reserve or 2nd Line units for each existing TF unit had been authorised on 31 August 1914. Initially these were formed from men who had not volunteered for overseas service, together with the recruits who were flooding in. Later they were mobilised for overseas service in their own right. These battalions were distinguished by the prefix '2/' being added to their title, while the parent battalions took '1/'; later, 3rd Line battalions were organised as well.

=== 1/5th Battalion ===
On 31 March 1915 the West Riding Division was informed that it had been selected to proceed to France to join the British Expeditionary Force, and the infantry embarked at Folkestone, the 1/5th Bn landing at Boulogne on 14 April 1915. On 15 May, the division officially became the 49th (West Riding) Division, and the 2nd Brigade became 147th (2nd West Riding) Brigade.

The battalion now underwent more than a year of trench warfare with few notable events except a peripheral part in the Battle of Aubers Ridge (9 May 1915) and sustaining the First German phosgene attack on British troops (19 December 1915).

==== Somme ====
For the attack on the first day of the Battle of the Somme (the Battle of Albert, 1 July 1916), 49th was the reserve division for X Corps, which was tasked with capturing the Thiepval plateau. 147th Brigade was moved up in the late morning, crossing the swampy River Ancre, and then occupying dug-outs previously occupied by the attacking divisions. The brigade thus escaped the casualties suffered by the rest of the 49th Division as it renewed the fruitless attacks on Thiepval. However, the 49th Division was thrown into action repeatedly during the long Battle of the Somme:

- Battle of Bazentin Ridge (14–17 July)
- Battle of Pozières Ridge (23 July–18 August and again 27 August–3 September)
- Battle of Flers–Courcelette (15–22 September)

==== Ypres ====
During the Third Ypres Offensive the 49th Division was engaged in peripheral activities along the Flanders Coast from 12 July to 23 September 1917, which came to nothing as the main Ypres attacks failed to break through the German lines. 49th Division made one attack at Ypres, at the Battle of Poelcappelle on 9 October. The division started from its assembly area during the previous night. Ground conditions were atrocious, the approach routes were under enemy shellfire, and the men only just reached their jumping-off line before Zero hour. Much of the supporting artillery was unable to get into position. Consequently, the attack bogged down virtually on the start line. Casualties were heavy, and many of them could not be evacuated until the exhausted 49th Division was relieved by the New Zealand Division.

==== Disbandment ====
By the beginning of 1918 the British manpower crisis was so bad that one battalion in each brigade was broken up to provide reinforcements. At the end of January 1918 the 1/5th Duke of Wellingtons was disbanded. Some men were drafted to other battalions of 147 Bde, the remainder were transferred to the 62nd Division where they amalgamated with 2/5th Bn, which became simply the 5th Bn.

=== 2/5th Battalion ===
The 2/5th Duke of Wellington's was raised at Huddersfield on 9 October 1914, forming part of 2/2nd West Riding Bde in 2nd West Riding Division, later numbered 186th (2/2nd West Riding) Brigade and 62nd (2nd West Riding) Division respectively. The division began to assemble for training in Derbyshire and Nottinghamshire in March 1915. The 2nd Line battalions were already supplying reinforcements to the 1st Line; once they left their regimental stations in March, new 3rd Line or Reserve battalions were formed to take over this role.

Arms and equipment were slow to reach the units. A few drill and service rifles were received in April 1915, but these were soon withdrawn and replaced by .256-in Japanese Ariska rifles with which to train. These were not replaced with Lee-Enfield service rifles until January 1916. Meanwhile, the troops trained in the Dukeries area of Nottinghamshire and in south and east Yorkshire until November 1915, when it moved to Newcastle upon Tyne, where it dug an entrenched defence line. Finally, it moved to Salisbury Plain for battle training at the beginning of 1916.

However, recruitment in the West Riding was unable to keep up with the demands of the units already raised there, and orders were issued on 14 March 1916 that for each draft reaching the units of the 62nd Division an equal number had to be returned to the 3rd Line for drafting to the 1st Line battalions in France. This arrangement considerably delayed the despatch of 62nd Division on active service. It was only after spending the summer of 1916 training in East Anglia (with 2/5th Bn stationed at Halesworth, Suffolk in June) and then moving into winter quarters in the East Midlands (with 2/5th Bn at Bedford) that orders were issued on 23 December for the division to be ready to embark for France on 5 January 1917.

==== 1917 ====
By 18 January the division had crossed from Southampton to Le Havre and concentrated around Authie. It served in the operations on the River Ancre in February and March, and later in March it followed up the German retreat to the Hindenburg Line. On 11 April it was engaged in the First Battle of Bullecourt, and on 15 April 186th Bde was involved in repelling the German attack at Lagnicourt. 62nd Division attacked again at the Second Battle of Bullecourt in early May, and was engaged in further actions along the Hindbenburg Line later in the month.

The division was not involved in the great Ypres offensive of 1917, and was therefore fresh when it was selected to take part in the tank attack at Cambrai on 20 November. The division attacked towards Havrincourt, where the Germans put up most resistance. 186th Brigade was in divisional reserve, and after the village had been cleared, it moved on towards the second objective, the village of Graincourt. Men of the Duke's were reported to have advanced firing Lewis guns from the hip during street fighting in Anneaux. On the second day of the battle, 186th Bde attacked towards Bourlon with 2/5th Duke of Wellington's as the reserve battalion. The last attack on Bourlon village was made on 27 November, when 2/5th Bn was checked by heavy machine-gun fire and was unable to link up with the flanking division. The division was then relieved.

==== 1918 ====
At the end of January 1918 the battalion absorbed part of the 1/5th Bn (see above) and was redesignated simply 5th Bn; at the same time the 2/6th Duke of Wellingtons in 186 Bde was also broken up, and some of the men were drafted into the 5th Bn.

During the German spring offensive, 62nd Division came up from support and was involved in the Battles of Bapaume (25 March) and Arras (28 March). After some four days' hard fighting the German advance was halted in the division's sector.

In June 1918, the 2/7th Duke of Wellingtons in 186 Bde was broken up, and some of the men were drafted into the 5th Bn. Similarly, the battalion received some men from the 12th Bn Green Howards when that was broken up in July 1918.

From 20 to 30 July the 62nd Division counter-attacked under French command in the Battle of Tardenois. It then reverted to British command for the Allied Hundred Days Offensive, beginning with the Second Battle of Bapaume, when the division effectively exploited a pre-dawn attack by 2nd Division on 25 August, and then attacked again in the afternoon of 29 August, when the 5th Bn was recorded as having followed the Creeping barrage and achieving a great success 'with the bayonet'. It continued with the Battle of the Drocourt-Quéant Line (2 September) and then advanced to the Hindenburg Line to participate in the battles of Havrincourt (12 September) and Canal du Nord (27–30 September).

At the Canal du Nord, 186th Bde was tasked with passing through the first wave of attackers to seize the canal crossings at Marcoing to form a bridgehead on 28 September. The canal here was 50 foot (15 m) wide, and the water had run out of the damaged locks, resulting in thick mud. However, 5th Duke's crossed the damaged bridge in single file and by 11.00 was aligned along the railway embankment beyond. From here any further advance was stopped by heavy fire. A fresh barrage at 18.00 allowed the battalion to renew its advance to the final objective, the support trench of the German Marcoing Line. At this point the centre and left companies were heavily counter-attacked, and were fired at from the rear where insufficiently guarded prisoners had picked up weapons and returned to the fight. The two centre companies succeeded in retiring to the railway embankment but the left company was almost surrounded and had to fight its way out. The right company, however, maintained its position in the Marcoing Line. The following day 2/4th Duke's passed through the battalion's position and continued the advance.

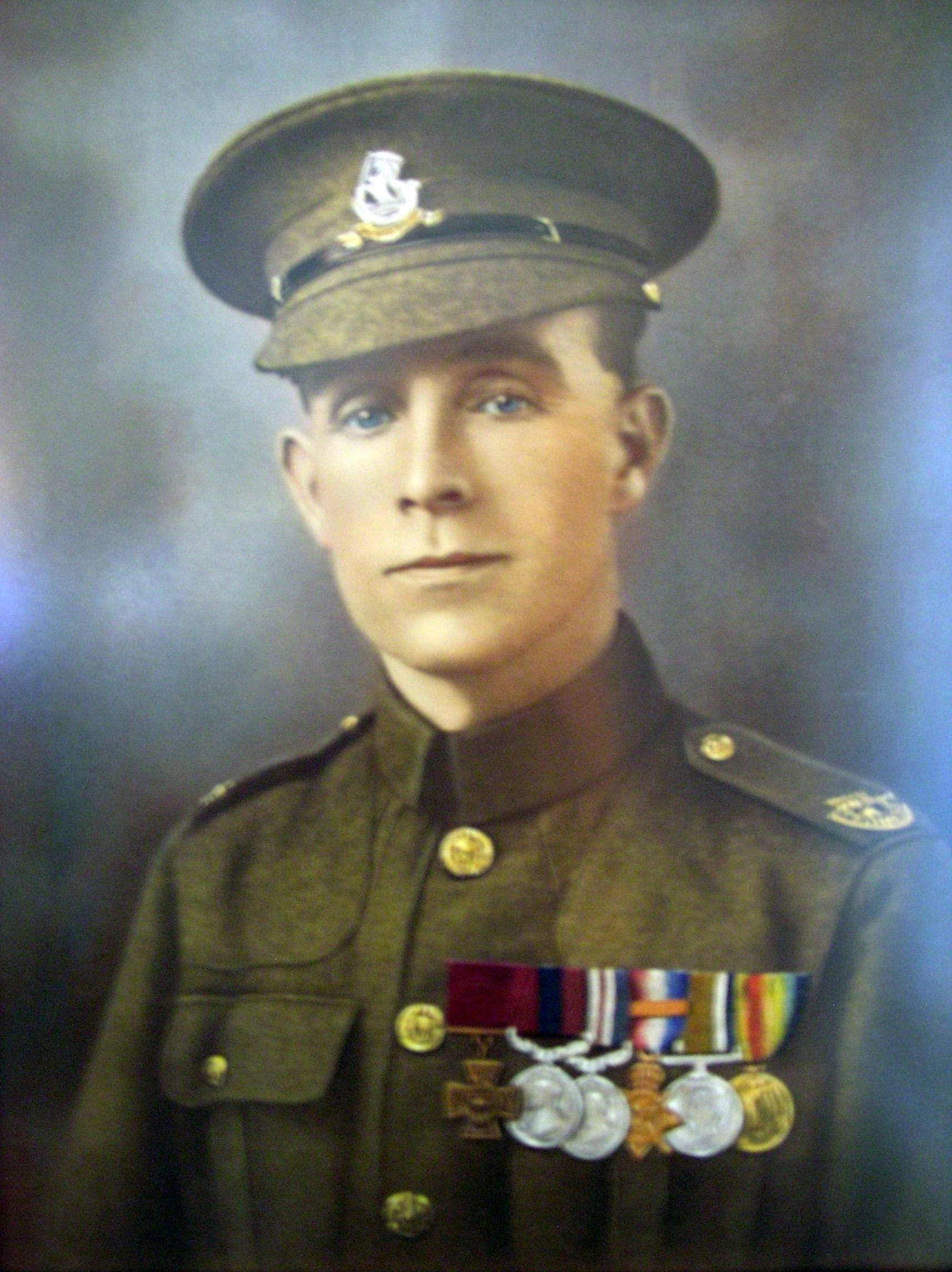
Private Henry Tandey, VC, DCM, MM.

Private Henry Tandey, a pre-war Regular soldier, had joined the battalion from 12th Bn Green Howards on 26 July. In a single month he won a Distinguished Conduct Medal at Vaulx Vraucourt on 28 August, a Military Medal at Havrincourt on 12 September and finally a Victoria Cross at Marcoing on 28 September (when he was wounded), making him the most highly decorated private soldier of the British Army in the war.

On 20 October, during the Battle of the Selle, a company of 5th Duke's waded across the River Selle unopposed at St Python even before Zero hour and the rest of the battalion crossed by bridges erected by the sappers in the dark. After some hard fighting they pushed on to their objective, forming a defensive flank to cover the capture of Solesmes by the rest of the brigade.

At the opening of the Battle of the Sambre on 4 November, 186th Bde led off, but the start was hampered by German counter-bombardment and mist. Resistance was slight at first, but stiffened as the advance continued. However, they pushed on again in the afternoon, the brigade taking hundreds of prisoners.

Afterwards, the division remained in the front line and fought its way toward Maubeuge, passing through the southern outskirts and crossing the River Sambre on 9 November. When the Armistice came into force on 11 November there was no sign of the rapidly retreating enemy in front of the division's outposts. The division was selected to move into Germany and occupy bridgeheads on the Rhine, taking up its positions on 25 December. It was the only TF division to cross the frontier into Germany. From 21 February 1919 the infantry battalions were progressively relieved by other units and returned to England for demobilisation. The battalion was formally disembodied on 26 May 1919.

=== 3/5th Battalion ===
This battalion was formed at Huddersfield on 25 March 1915 to provide drafts to the 1st and 2nd Line. In April 1916 it was designated the 5th Reserve Bn, and went with the other reserve battalions of the regiment to Clipstone Camp, Nottinghamshire. On 1 September 1916 it was absorbed by the 4th Reserve Bn.

== Interwar ==
When the TF was reconstituted on 7 February 1920 (renamed the Territorial Army (TA) in 1921) the 5th Battalion, Duke of Wellington's Regiment was reformed at Huddersfield, once again in 147th (2nd West Riding) Brigade of 49th (West Riding) Division.

In the 1930s the increasing need for anti-aircraft (AA) defence for Britain's cities was addressed by converting a number of TA infantry battalions into searchlight battalions of the Royal Engineers (RE). The 5th Duke of Wellington's was one unit selected for this role, becoming 43rd (5th Duke of Wellington's) Anti-Aircraft Battalion, RE on 10 December 1936, retaining its Duke of Wellington's cap badge. Consisting of HQ and four AA companies (370–373) at the Drill Hall, Huddersfield, the unit was subordinated to 31st (North Midland) AA Group (later Brigade) in 2nd AA Division.

With the continued expansion of Britain's AA Defences, new formations were created under AA Command, and in June 1939 the 31st AA Bde transferred to a new 7th AA Division in time for mobilisation just before the outbreak of World War II

== World War II ==
=== Mobilisation ===
The TA's AA units were mobilised on 23 September 1938 during the Munich Crisis, with units manning their emergency positions within 24 hours, even though many did not yet have their full complement of men or equipment. The emergency lasted three weeks, and they were stood down on 13 October. In February 1939 the existing AA defences came under the control of a new Anti-Aircraft Command. In June, as the international situation worsened, a partial mobilisation of the TA was begun in a process known as 'couverture', whereby each AA unit did a month's tour of duty in rotation to man selected AA gun and searchlight positions.

On 1 August 1940, all the AA battalions of the Royal Engineers were transferred to the Royal Artillery (RA), where they were termed searchlight regiments, the Huddersfield unit becoming the 43rd (5th Duke of Wellington's) Searchlight Regiment, RA.

=== Blitz ===
In November 1940, during the Blitz, the brigade transferred again to 10th AA Division, responsible for the air defence of Yorkshire and the Humber Estuary, with 31st AA Bde concentrating on defending the industrial cities of West Yorkshire. It remained with this formation for the next two years.

=== Mid-war ===
The regiment supplied a cadre of experienced officers and men to 238th S/L Training Rgt at Buxton where it provided the basis for a new 544 S/L Bty formed on 16 January 1941. This battery later joined a newly forming 91st S/L Rgt. From 12 May 1941, 370 S/L Bty came under command of 30th (Surrey) S/L Rgt in 39 AA Bde, then in the summer of 1941, the battery came under 84th S/L Rgt in 39 AA Bde. On 23 January 1942 371 Bty left the regiment and permanently joined 60th (Middlesex) S/L Rgt

Early in 1943 the regiment transferred to 32 (Midland) AA Bde (both brigades being in what was now 5 AA Group). By August 1943 the regiment was in 50 AA Bde.

By early 1944 AA Command was being forced to release manpower for the planned Allied invasion of Normandy (Operation Overlord), and all Home Defence searchlight regiments were reduced by one battery. On 1 June E Troop of 372 Bty left and joined 58th (Middlesex) S/L Rgt as E/425 Trp.

=== Operation Overlord ===
In the planning for Operation Overlord, No. 85 Group RAF was to be responsible for Night-fighter cover of the beachhead and bases in Normandy after D-Day, and was keen to have searchlight assistance in the same way as Fighter Command had in the UK. 50 AA Brigade (now often referred to as 50 S/L Bde) joined 21st Army Group's GHQ AA Troops for this purpose, although it retained responsibilities under AA Command. A detailed plan was drawn up for a belt of S/L positions deployed from Caen to the Cherbourg peninsula. This required nine S/L batteries of 24 lights, spaced at 6000 yard intervals, six rows deep. Each battery area was to have an orbit beacon, around which up to four fighters would be positioned at varying heights. These would be allocated by fighter controllers, and the S/Ls would assist by illuminating targets and indicating raid approaches, while area boundaries would be marked by vertical S/Ls. 43rd (5th Duke of Wellington's) S/L Rgt was one of the regiments specially trained for this work.

For example, 370 S/L Bty spent September 1944 undergoing battle training in Devonshire. In practice, most of this plan was never implemented, liaison with the US Army units around Cherbourg having proved problematical once they were on the ground. 50 S/L Brigade therefore remained in AA Command, waiting to cross to Normandy until long after D-Day.

=== 600 Regiment, RA ===
By the autumn of 1944, the German Luftwaffe was suffering from such shortages of pilots, aircraft and fuel that serious aerial attacks on the UK could be discounted. At the same time 21st Army Group was experiencing a severe manpower shortage, particularly among the infantry. The War Office began to reorganise surplus AA regiments in the UK into infantry units, primarily for duties in the rear areas, thereby releasing trained infantry for frontline service. On 1 October 1944, 43rd S/L Rgt was converted into 43rd (5th Bn Duke of Wellingtons) Garrison Regiment, RA. A month later, it was reorganised as an infantry battalion and redesignated 600th Regiment RA (5th Bn Duke of Wellingtons). It was the first such RA infantry regiment formed, and was sent to join Second Army in NW Europe for line of communication duties. The unit was placed in 'suspended animation' in February 1945 and its personnel drafted to other units.

== Postwar ==
When the TA was reconstituted in 1947, the regiment was initially reformed at Huddersfield as 578th (5th Bn Duke of Wellington's) Searchlight Regiment, RA. However, shortly afterwards it was re-roled as a mobile AA artillery unit under the designation 578th (5th Bn, The Duke of Wellington's Regiment) Heavy Anti-Aircraft Regiment, RA It formed part of 69 AA Bde based in Leeds.

On 10 March 1955, AA Command was disbanded and there was a major reduction in the number of TA air defence units. 578 HAA Rgt was amalgamated with 382 Medium Regiment, RA and 673 Light AA Regiment, RA, which had formerly been the 4th and 6th Battalions respectively of the Duke of Wellington's Regiment. The amalgamated regiment continued as 382 Medium Regiment, with the 578th providing one battery (sources differ as to whether this was designated 'P' or 'Q' Bty).

In 1957, some personnel of the 5th Duke of Wellington's battery transferred to the 7th Bn Duke of Wellington's (originally the other half of the 2nd Volunteer Bn split up in 1908, see above), which was redesignated 5th/7th Battalion Duke of Wellington's Regiment. Finally, in 1961, the rest of 382 Medium Regiment RA converted to infantry and merged with the 5th/7th Bn, bringing together all four Territorial battalions of the regiment. It was designated the West Riding Battalion of the Duke of Wellington's and in 1967 merged into the all-Territorial Yorkshire Volunteers.

== Honorary Colonels ==
- Sir Hildred Carlile, 1st Baronet, CBE, TD, was appointed Honorary Colonel on 23 June 1906, and retained the position until World War II.

== Battle Honours ==
The regiment was awarded the Battle Honour South Africa 1900–02 for the participation of its volunteer detachment in the 2nd Boer War. The TF battalions contributed to the honours awarded to the parent regiment after World War I. The Royal Artillery does not carry battle honours, so none were awarded for the battalion's service during World War II.

== Insignia ==
The battalion retained its Duke of Wellington's Regiment cap badge when converted to the searchlight role. 578th HAA Regiment wore it on a red backing, together with a red lanyard for sergeants and above.

== Online sources ==
- British Army units from 1945 on
- British Military History
- Land Forces of Britain, the Empire and Commonwealth – Regiments.org (archive site)
- The Royal Artillery 1939–45
- Graham Watson, The Territorial Army 1947
