= Hondeghem =

Hondeghem Hondegem
- Commune
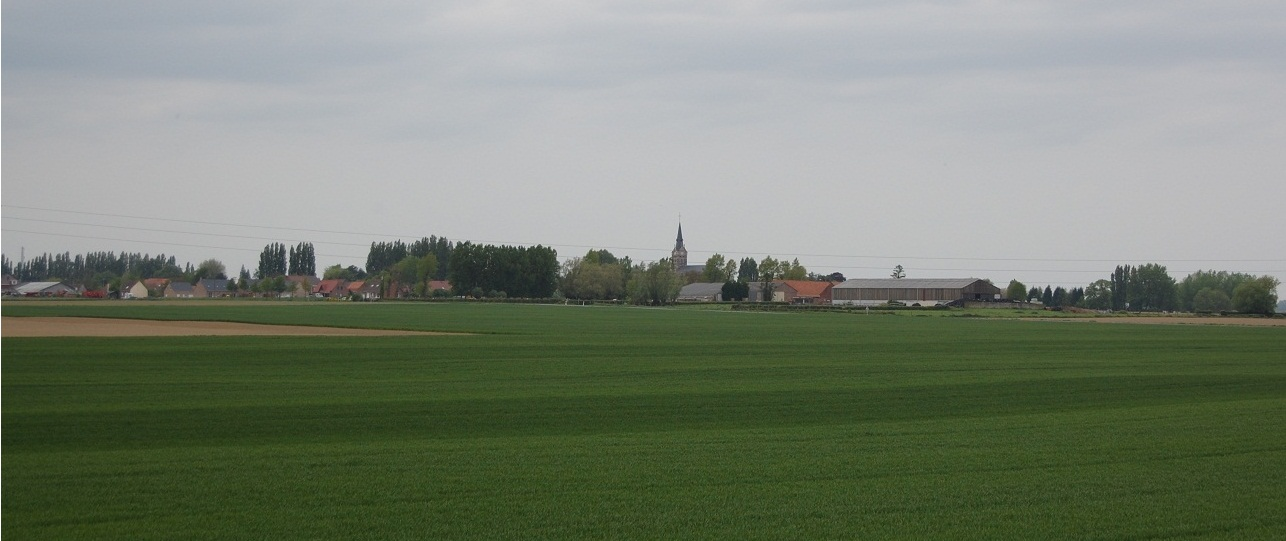
- Hondeghem in the arrondissement of Dunkirk

- Coat of arms
- Location of Hondeghem
- Location within France Location within Hauts-de-France
- Coordinates: 50°45′27″N 2°31′19″E
- Country: France
- Region: Hauts-de-France
- Department: Nord
- Arrondissement: Dunkirk
- Canton: Bailleul
- Intercommunality: CA Cœur de Flandre

Government
  - Mayor (2020–2026): Jean-Pierre Feramus
- Area^{1}: 12.6 km^{2} (4.9 sq mi)
- Elevation: 41 m (135 ft)
- Highest elevation: 57 m (187 ft)
- Lowest elevation: 24 m (79 ft)
- Population (2023): 916
  - Density: 72.7/km^{2} (188/sq mi)
- Time zone: UTC+01:00 (CET)
  - Summer (DST): UTC+02:00 (CEST)
- INSEE/Postal code: 59308 /59190
- ^{1} French Land Register data, which excludes lakes, ponds, glaciers > 1 km^{2} (0.386 sq mi or 247 acres) and river estuaries.

Hondeghem (French pronunciation: [ɔ̃dɡɛm]; from Flemish; Hondegem in modern Dutch spelling) is a commune in the Nord department in northern France.

== Heraldry ==
| Arms of Hondeghem | The arms of Hondeghem are blazoned : Argent, a fess embattled counterembattled gules. |

== See also ==
- Communes of the Nord department
