= 58th (Middlesex) Searchlight Regiment, Royal Artillery =

58th (Middlesex) Searchlight Regiment 593 (Harrow) Heavy AA Regiment
- Active: 1 November 1938 – 4 July 1955
- Country: United Kingdom
- Branch: Territorial Army
- Type: Searchlight Regiment; Infantry Battalion; Anti-Aircraft Regiment
- Role: Air Defence
- Garrison/HQ: Harrow, Middlesex
- Engagements: Battle of Britain; The Blitz; Operation Diver

58th (Middlesex) Searchlight Regiment, Royal Artillery was an air defence unit of Britain's Territorial Army (TA) raised just before World War II. It defended the East Midlands of England during The Blitz, and later served as infantry in North West Europe at the end of the war, converting to the anti-aircraft (AA) artillery role postwar.

== Origin ==
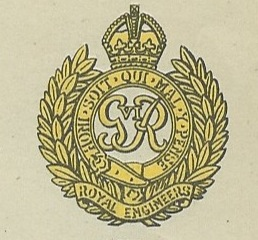
Cap badge of the Royal Engineers.

This searchlight unit was formed as part of the doubling in size of the TA at the time of the Munich Crisis in late 1938. Formally, it was a duplicate of 36th (Middlesex) Anti-Aircraft Battalion, Royal Engineers, based on 344 AA Company at Harrow, which was transferred from 36th AA Battalion to provide a cadre of trained men. Two new companies were then formed to give the unit the following organisation:

58th (Middlesex) Anti-Aircraft Battalion, Royal Engineers

- HQ at Elmgrove Road, Harrow
- 344 AA Company at Harrow
- 425 AA Company at Drill Hall, Roxeth, South Harrow
- 426 AA Company at Harrow

The first commanding officer was Lt-Col Edward Boggis, MBE, who had been officer commanding 344th AA Company.

== World War II ==
90 cm 'Projector Anti-Aircraft', displayed at Fort Nelson, Portsmouth.

=== Mobilisation ===
In February 1939, the existing AA defences came under the control of a new Anti-Aircraft Command. In June a partial mobilisation of TA units was begun in a process known as 'couverture', whereby each AA unit did a month's tour of duty in rotation to man selected AA and searchlight positions. On 24 August, ahead of the declaration of war, AA Command was fully mobilised at its war stations. The outbreak of World War II saw 58 AA Battalion forming part of 40th Anti-Aircraft Brigade in 2nd AA Division. Based at RAF Duxford, the brigade was responsible for providing AA defence for RAF airfields in East Anglia. In April 1940, 58th moved to come under the command of 39 AA Bde.

Cap Badge of the Royal Artillery (pre-1953).

=== Battle of Britain and Blitz ===
On 1 August 1940, the Royal Engineers' AA battalions were transferred to the Royal Artillery (RA), being redesignated searchlight regiments, and the companies became batteries. By this time, 58th (Middlesex) had been moved to 32nd (Midland) Anti-Aircraft Brigade, still in 2 AA Division, but now responsible for AA defence of the East Midlands during the forthcoming Blitz.

A new 511 S/L Bty was formed for the regiment in late 1940. Initially, it was attached to the 40th (Sherwood Foresters) S/L Rgt and remained in 39 AA Bde, coming under command of 30th (Surrey) S/L Rgt from 8 January (when it was considered operationally active) until 12 May 1941, when it rejoined 58th S/L Rgt. The battery permanently joined 30th (Surrey) S/L Rgt in early 1942. The regiment also supplied a cadre of experienced officers and men to 233rd S/L Training Rgt at Saighton Camp, where it provided the basis for a new 539 S/L Bty formed on 12 December 1940. This battery later joined a newly forming 88th S/L Rgt.

In 1941, the searchlight layout over the Midlands was reorganised, so that any hostile raid approaching the Gun Defended Areas (GDA) around the towns must cross more than one searchlight belt, and then within the GDAs the concentration of lights was increased.

=== 344th Battery ===
On 19 April 1943, 344th Bty received orders to train for a mobile role, and after this training it joined 100 AA Bde on 30 June. 100 AA Bde was one of the formations slated to participate in Operation Overlord (the Allied invasion of Normandy planned for 1944) and shortly afterwards the battery became formally independent of 58 S/L regiment. 344th Independent S/L Bty proceeded to Normandy in July 1944, where it pioneered the use of searchlights to create artificial moonlight, otherwise known as movement light or 'Monty's Moonlight', to aid movement in night operations by 21st Army Group. In February 1945, it changed its title to 344th Independent Moonlight Bty and split off a separate 581st Independent Moonlight Battery.

=== Operation Diver ===
Meanwhile, the rest of 58th S/L Regt (425 and 426 Btys) had remained with AA Command. In May 1944, it was joined by 314 (Kent) S/L Bty from 29th (Kent) S/L Rgt. Then, on 1 June, E Troop of 372 S/L Bty of 43rd (5th Duke of Wellington's Regiment) S/L Rgt joined and became E Trp of 425 S/L Bty. Soon after D Day in June 1944, the bombardment of London by German V-1 flying bombs began, and AA Command was engaged in the efforts to combat them (Operation Diver). Much of AA Command's strength was repositioned on the South Coast of England to engage the V-1s as they came in over the sea. In the centre of the line, at Dungeness, were four Z Batteries, each of 64 twin 3-inch rocket-launchers. Z Batteries defending towns were by 1944 largely manned by shifts of part-time members of the Home Guard, but for these frontline batteries the detachments were provided by 58th S/L Regiment, which had been hastily trained in the new role.

The most severe phase of V1 attacks on the UK ended in September 1944, after the launching sites were overrun by the advance of 21st Army Group along the coast of France and Belgium.

=== Infantry role ===
By the end of 1944, the German Luftwaffe was suffering from such shortages of pilots, aircraft and fuel that serious aerial attacks on the United Kingdom could be discounted and the War Office began reorganising surplus anti-aircraft regiments in the UK into infantry battalions for duties in the rear areas. 58th Searchlight Regiment was one of the units selected for conversion and, on 9 November 1944, it was ordered to convert, being redesignated 58th (Middlesex) Garrison Regiment, RA. (314 Searchlight Bty became independent and eventually rejoined 29th S/L Rgt.)

Meanwhile, 21st Army Group fighting in North West Europe was suffering a severe manpower shortage, particularly among the infantry. In January 1945, the War Office accelerated the conversion of surplus artillery into infantry units, primarily for line of communication and occupation duties, thereby releasing trained infantry for frontline service. 58 Garrison Regiment was redesignated again, becoming 611 (Middlesex) Infantry Regiment, RA in February. It went to North West Europe the following month and did duty with Second Army until after VE Day. It was placed in suspended animation on 31 October 1945.

== Postwar ==
When the TA was reconstituted on 1 January 1947, the regiment reformed as 593 (Middlesex) (Mixed) Heavy Anti-Aircraft Regiment, RA at Harrow, ('mixed' indicating that it was composed partly of members of the Women's Royal Army Corps). Its title was later changed to 593 (Harrow) HAA Regiment. It was assigned to 82 AA Bde based at Heston

On 10 March 1955, Anti-Aircraft Command was disbanded, and many of its TA regiments were reduced: 593 HAA Regiment was placed in suspended animation, and completely disbanded on 4 July that year.

== Badge ==
During 1941, the regiment adopted as its arm badge a blue Cornflower embroidered on a khaki disc. The cornflower is the traditional buttonhole worn by supporters of Harrow School at the Eton-Harrow match, the annual cricket match against Eton College held at Lord's Cricket Ground. The regiment and its successors continued to wear the badge until disbandment in 1955.

== Online sources ==
- British Army units from 1945 on
- British Military History
- Orders of Battle at Patriot Files
- Sir Frederick Pile's despatch: "The Anti-Aircraft Defence of the United Kingdom from 28th July, 1939, to 15th April, 1945" London Gazette 18 December 1947.
- The Royal Artillery 1939–45
- Graham Watson, The Territorial Army 1947
