= Parachute mine =

Naval mine dropped from aircraft by parachute

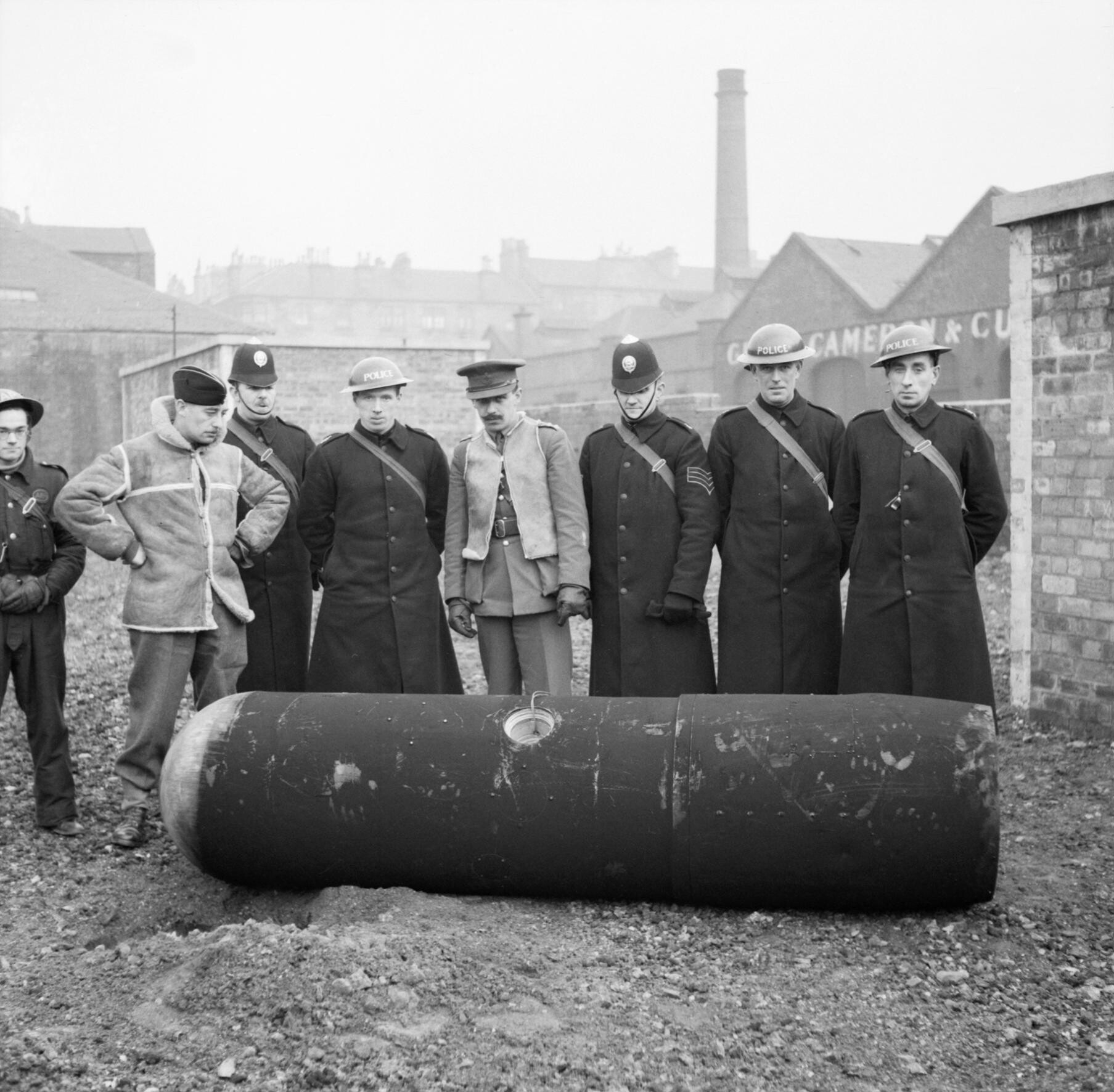
A defused, German 1,000 kg 'Luftmine'. Glasgow, 18 March 1941

A parachute mine is a naval mine dropped from an aircraft by parachute. They were mostly used in the Second World War by the Luftwaffe and initially by the Royal Air Force (RAF) Bomber Command. Frequently, they were dropped on land targets.

== History ==
=== Luftwaffe ===
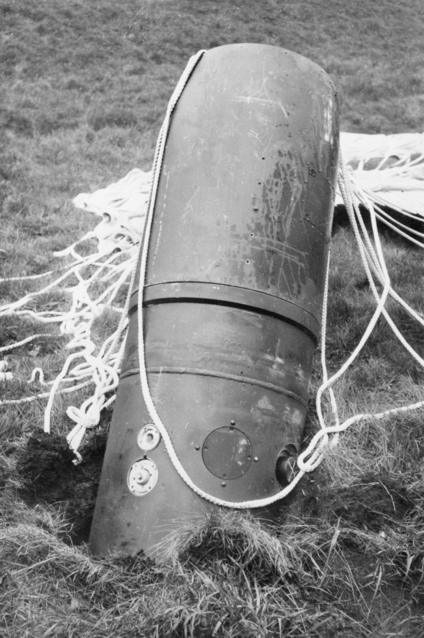
A German parachute mine that landed in the grounds of the Royal Arsenal at Woolwich, circa 1940 to 1942

After the parachute opened, the mine would descend at around 40 miles per hour (64 km/h; 18 m/s). If it came down on land, a clockwork mechanism would detonate the mine 25 seconds after impact. If the mine landed in water it would sink to the bottom. If the depth was greater than 8 feet (2.4 m), water pressure and the dissolving of a water–soluble plug would deactivate the clockwork time-detonator, and activate an anti-shipping detonator. These were initially magnetic detonators but later, acoustic or magnetic/acoustic detonators could be fitted. The Luftwaffe began dropping mines in British waters in November 1939, using Heinkel He 115 seaplanes and Heinkel He 111 land–based bombers. The new British cruiser, HMS Belfast, was damaged by a parachute mine on 21 November in the Firth of Forth, while the destroyer HMS Gipsy was damaged at Harwich on the same night.

The threat to shipping posed by magnetic detonators was effectively negated after a German parachute mine was captured intact when it landed in mud in the Thames Estuary. Thereafter, a ship's magnetic field could be counteracted by a process called degaussing. This involved either the installation of electric wires around the inside of the hull, or for smaller vessels, by passing an electric cable under the hull, known as "wiping".

==== Non-naval use ====
Parachute mines were first used against land targets on 16 September 1940 in the early stages of the Blitz. It was rumoured that Hermann Göring had ordered parachute mines to be dropped on London in a fit of temper, but it is more likely that they were originally intended to disrupt shipping in the London Docks. From October 1940, mines were also dropped in raids on other British cities such as Birmingham, Liverpool, Manchester, Coventry, and Southampton. Clearance of these was carried out by the Royal Navy, which quickly dispatched a team to London from HMS Vernon, while Army bomb disposal staff were warned that it was extremely inadvisable to attempt to render them safe without Naval guidance. The official British designation for these weapons on land was "Parachute Landmines", but civilians just called them "land mines".

The singer Al Bowlly was killed by a parachute mine which exploded outside his flat in Jermyn Street, London during the Blitz on 17 April 1941.

In 1941 a parachute bomb destroyed Victoria Hall, Sunderland, Tyne and Wear, site of the Victoria Hall disaster of 1883.

The use of standard parachute mines declined after 1941, but the Luftwaffe later used the 1,000 kg (2,200 lb) Bombenmine (BM 1000, Monika, or G Mine). This was fitted with a tail made from Bakelite which broke up on impact. It had a photodetector beneath a cover which detonated the bomb if exposed to light to counteract the work of bomb disposal units.

=== British operations ===
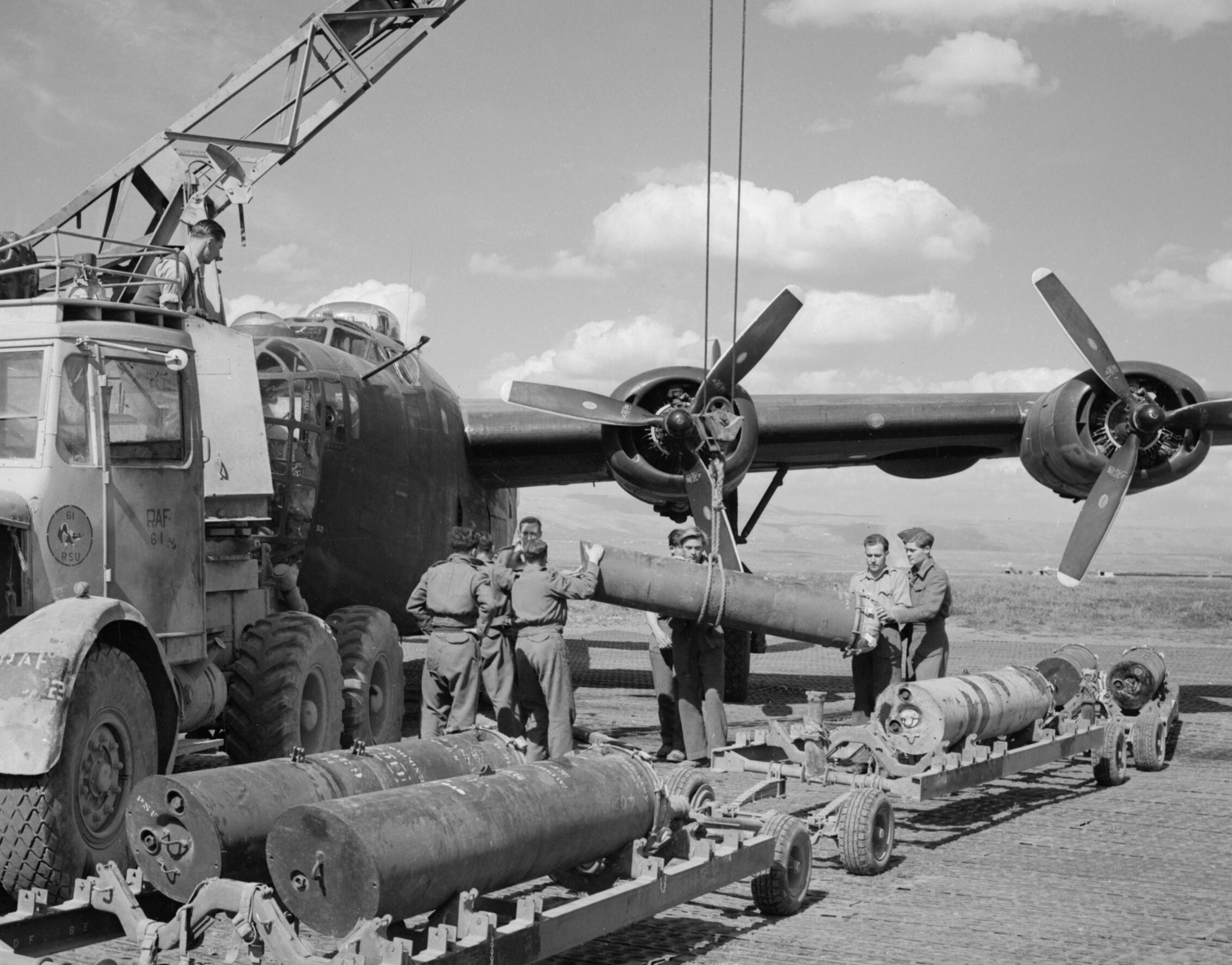
Arming a Liberator for minelaying along the Danube, Celone, Italy

Minelaying operations by RAF were known as "Gardening".

Mines were about 9 ft (2.7 m) long and 17 in (0.43 m) in diameter. They weighed 1,500 lb (680 kg), and contained 750 lb (340 kg) of explosive such as Amatol (TNT and ammonium nitrate) or Minol (TNT, ammonium nitrate and aluminium).
