= 39th Anti-Aircraft Brigade =

39th Anti-Aircraft Brigade 103 Anti-Aircraft Brigade 103 Infantry Brigade 65 Anti-Aircraft Brigade
- Active: 29 September 1938 – 31 December 1957
- Country: United Kingdom
- Branch: Territorial Army
- Type: Anti-Aircraft Brigade
- Role: Air Defence; Occupation duties (1945–46)
- Part of: 2 AA Division; 7 AA Division; 10 AA Division; 5 AA Group; 3 AA Group; 21st Army Group
- Garrison/HQ: Retford; RAF Digby; RAF Kirton in Lindsey
- Engagements: Battle of Britain; Hull Blitz; Operation Diver; North West Europe; Defence of Antwerp

Commanders
- Notable commanders: Brigadier Osmund Frith

39th Anti-Aircraft Brigade was an air defence formation of Britain's Territorial Army (TA) during the Second World War. It was responsible under Anti-Aircraft Command for protecting industry along the Humber Estuary and airfields in Lincolnshire during The Blitz. Later it defended the coast of East Anglia against Luftwaffe 'hit-and-run' attacks. It was later converted to a field force formation, covered the embarkation ports for Operation Overlord and defended London against V-1 flying bombs. It served in the campaign in North West Europe, defending Antwerp against V-1s and supervising the clean-up of the notorious Bergen-Belsen concentration camp.

== Origin ==
With the expansion of Britain's Anti-Aircraft (AA) defences in the late 1930s, new formations were created to command the growing number of Royal Artillery (RA) and Royal Engineers (RE) AA gun and searchlight units. 39th AA Brigade was raised on 29 September 1938 at Retford in Nottinghamshire, the HQ later moving to RAF Digby in Lincolnshire. Initially, it formed part of 2nd AA Division, and its units were all transferred from other brigades within the division. Its role was to defend airfields and other vulnerable points (VPs) in Lincolnshire and Humberside. At the outbreak of war, 39 AA Bde was commanded by Brigadier (later Maj-Gen) O.T. Frith.

== Mobilisation ==
At the time the brigade was formed, the TA's AA units were in a state of mobilisation because of the Munich crisis, although they were soon stood down. In February 1939 the TA's AA defences came under the control of a new Anti-Aircraft Command. In June a partial mobilisation of TA units was begun in a process known as 'couverture', whereby each unit did a month's tour of duty in rotation to man selected AA and searchlight positions. The same month, 39 AA Bde came under the command of the newly formed 7 AA Division, which was created to control the AA defences of North East England, Yorkshire and Humberside. Its exact responsibilities were still being worked out when war broke out, and in fact 39 AA Bde remained under the operational control of 2 AA Division into 1940. AA Command mobilised fully on 24 August, ahead of the official declaration of war on 3 September.

The brigade already referred to its AA gun regiments as HAA (to distinguish them from the newer light AA or LAA units that were being formed); this became official across the Royal Artillery during 1940. The brigade had a mixture of 3-inch, 3.7-inch and 4.5-inch HAA guns under command. LAA units (mainly equipped with Lewis Light machine guns (LMGs)) were distributed to defend VPs such as factories and airfields. The searchlight (S/L) layouts were based on a spacing of 3500 yards (3200 m), but due to equipment shortages this was later extended to 6000 yards (5500 m).

=== Order of battle 1939 ===
On mobilisation in August 1939, 39 AA Bde had the following composition:

- 62nd (Northumbrian) AA Regiment, RA – HAA regiment formed from a field artillery regiment
  - HQ at Hull
  - 172nd (1st East Riding) Battery
  - 173rd (2nd East Riding) Battery
  - 266th (3rd East Riding) Battery
- 67th (The York and Lancaster Regiment) AA Regiment, RA – HAA regiment converted from an infantry battalion (5th Battalion, York and Lancaster Regiment)
  - HQ at Rotherham
  - 187th, 188th, 198th Batteries
- 91st AA Regiment, RA – new HAA regiment formed in April 1939
  - HQ at Goole
  - 221st (1st West Riding) Battery at York – from 62nd (Northumbrian) AA Rgt
  - 270th (Wentworth) Battery at Wentworth
  - 286th Battery at Goole
- 40th (The Sherwood Foresters) AA Battalion, RE – S/L unit converted from infantry (6th Battalion, The Sherwood Foresters)
  - HQ at Chesterfield
  - 358th, 359th 360th 361st AA Companies
- 46th (The Lincolnshire Regiment) AA Battalion, RE – S/L unit converted from infantry (5th Battalion, Lincolnshire Regiment)
  - HQ at Grimsby
  - 382nd, 383rd, 384th, 385th AA Companies
- 39th AA Brigade Company, Royal Army Service Corps (RASC)

67th HAA Regiment was deployed in the Sheffield Gun Zone, while 62nd and 91st HAA Rgts were in the Humber Gun Zone. The actual deployment of searchlights in the brigade's area differed from the published order of battle:

- 42nd (Robin Hoods, Sherwood Foresters) AA Bn, RE – S/L unit converted from 7th (Robin Hood) Bn, Sherwood Foresters
  - 366, 368, 369 AA Cos
- 44th (Leicestershire Regiment) AA Bn, RE – S/L unit converted from 4th Bn Leicestershire Regiment
  - 374, 377 AA Cos
- 46th (Lincolns) AA Bn, RE
  - 383, 384, 384 AA Cos
- 49th (West Yorkshire Regiment) AA Bn, RE – S/L unit converted from 6th Bn West Yorkshire Regiment
  - 397 AA Co

== Phoney War ==
On 23 September 1939, 39 AA Bde handed over responsibility for the Humber Gun Zone (including 62nd and 91st HAA Rgts) to 31 (North Midland) AA Bde, while taking over operational control of 13th LAA Rgt (37th, 38th and 122nd (Mobile) Btys) at Sheffield from 57 Light AA Bde in 7 AA Division. This unit was deployed across Lincolnshire at Cleethorpes, Scunthorpe, Stenigot and Killingholme. During October the brigade gained responsibility for further LAA units: 106 LAA Bty of 27th LAA Rgt (RAF Digby, RAF Waddington, Stenigot and Skegness), 39th LAA Rgt (RAF Hemswell, RAF Scampton, RAF Finningley and Cleethorpes) and (temporarily) 56th (East Lancashire) LAA Rgt training at Tuxford and Hatfield. 46th AA Battalion now controlled 306 AA Co (detached from 27th (London Electrical Engineers) AA Bn in the south of England) as well as its own four companies.

In November 1939 the brigade moved eight S/Ls (from 42nd AA Bn) from the western side of its area to the East Coast in an attempt to pick up low-flying aircraft laying Parachute mines in the mouth of the Humber. 306 AA Company moved to Grimsby to provide lighting for a Gun Zone. 44th AA Battalion was now part of 32 (Midland) AA Bde, but the two companies in 39 AA Bde's area remained.

13th LAA Rgt returned to 7 AA Division in January, while 39th LAA Rgt spread out to take over as much of its area as it could. 115 LAA Bty of 26th LAA Rgt came under the brigade's control in February and deployed 40 Lewis guns around Doncaster and later RAF Hatfield Woodhouse in March under 39th LAA Rgt. The anti-mining S/L sites on the coast were taken over by 383 and 306 AA Cos of 46th AA Bn in February, and the 42nd AA Bn detachments returned to their original positions.

At the beginning of March the brigade's first Gun-laying Mk I radar set became operational in the Sheffield Gun Zone. There was a serious shortage of Bofors 40 mm LAA guns (most LAA units still had to make do with Lewis guns) but a few were arriving, for example, three guns to defend RAF North Coates staffed by 39th LAA Rgt from May.

During March and April, 46th AA Bn (less 384 AA Co) left the brigade and moved to 7 AA Division, and was replaced by 30th (Surrey) AA Bn transferred to the brigade from 5 AA Division in Southern England, with battalion HQ setting up at Market Rasen Racecourse in Lincolnshire. The battalion took over the existing S/L sites in Lincolnshire and along the Humber Estuary, with company HQs at Market Rasen, Grimsby, Brigg and Thorne. and In April, 58th (Middlesex) AA Bn replaced 44th AA Bn. Later, 67th HAA Regiment transferred to 50 Light AA Bde in 2 AA Division to cover Derby and Nottingham.

On 15 May 39 AA Bde HQ moved from RAF Digby to RAF Kirton in Lindsey, and shortly afterwards it resumed control of the Humber Gun Zone (62nd and 91st HAA Rgts).

== Battle of Britain ==
After the Fall of France, German day and night air raids and mine laying began along the East Coast of England, intensifying through June 1940. Several times the Humber HAA guns were in action against aircraft attacking the Saltend (Hull) and Killingholme oil installations, and some of the airfields in 39 AA Bde's area were attacked, 30th (Surrey) AA Bn reporting damage to searchlight equipment from bomb splinters, and one searchlight site engaged an enemy aircraft with its Lewis gun. Other S/L sites combined with RAF Night fighters in a number of successful interceptions. During July the brigade was strengthened by further units: a battery of 52nd (East Lancashire) LAA Rgt, 400 AA Co (50th (Northamptonshire Regiment) AA Bn) and 467 S/L Bty (72nd (Middlesex) S/L Rgt). 17 HAA Bty (1st HAA Rgt) was ordered to man sites at Scunthorpe, and by the end of August had been joined by 1 and 2 HAA Btys, making Scunthorpe a full Gun Zone. As the Battle of Britain got under way during the summer, the Luftwaffe concentrated on Southern England, with occasional raids on the Humber and Sheffield.

On 1 August 1940 the AA battalions of the RE were transferred to the RA, where they were termed searchlight regiments and the companies became batteries.

In September the brigade transferred most of its responsibilities south of the Humber, including 1st HAA Rgt and 40th S/L Rgt, to other brigades in 2 AA Division. The S/L layout was also thinned out to a 6000-yard spacing and 306 AA Bty returned to London, but the brigade received one of the new Z Batteries equipped with AA rocket launchers (121 AA 'Z' Bty from the division's 2 AA 'Z' Regiment, RA), which was stationed at Grimsby.

== The Blitz ==
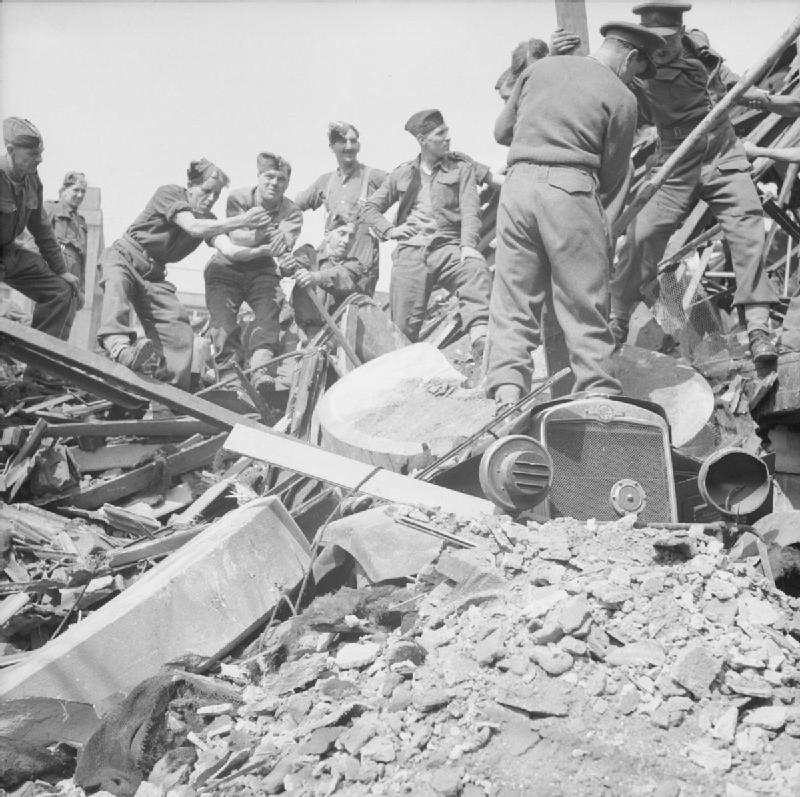
Troops of 9th Bn, Hampshire Regiment, helping to clear bomb damage in Hull.

As German night air raids on UK cities intensified (The Blitz), 39 AA Bde sent detachments to London in September and then to Sheffield in November to assist in their defence. 13th LAA Regiment left the UK in November, arriving in Egypt in January 1941, where it served in the Greek campaign, the Siege of Tobruk and later in the Italian campaign.

In November 1940, AA Command began changing S/L layouts to clusters of three lights spaced 10,400 yards (9500 m) apart. The cluster system was an attempt to improve the chances of picking up enemy bombers and keeping them illuminated for engagement by AA guns or night fighters. Eventually, one light in each cluster would be equipped with searchlight control (SLC) radar and act as 'master light', but the radar equipment was still in short supply.

A new 10 AA Division was created in November 1940, and 39 AA Bde was transferred to it, retaining its responsibility for the defence of the Humber Estuary and Scunthorpe. However, in practice the brigade remained responsible for Sheffield until 8 February 1941, when it handed over to 62 AA Bde. The Luftwaffe made a heavy raid on Sheffield on the night of 12/13 December which was also engaged by the Humber guns as it passed over.

On 15/16 January 1941 there was continuous activity through the night, as single Luftwaffe aircraft attacked various airfields and dropped mines in the Humber. There was intensive minelaying again in February, particularly on the nights of 14/15 and 22/23, with numerous engagements. The AA defences kept the attackers flying high and the mines often landed on shore; the brigade's guns claimed five 'kills' during the fortnight's activity.

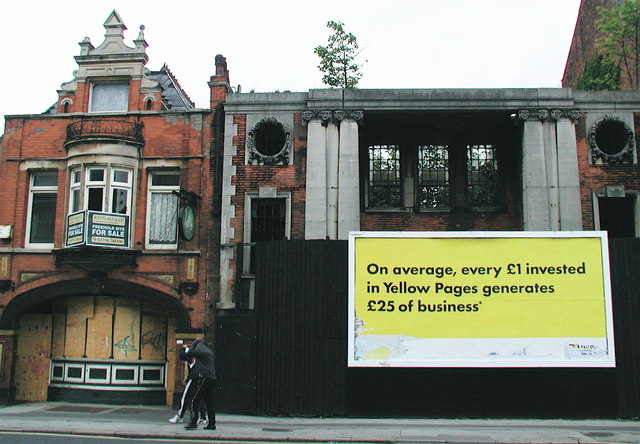
The National Picture Theatre (right) on Beverley Road, burnt out during the Hull Blitz, now a listed building under the National Civilian WW2 Memorial Trust

=== Hull Blitz ===
Hull itself was attacked by waves of aircraft on 25/26 February, with some damage and casualties. A more serious raid on 13/14 March left many fires burning and numerous casualties, and RAF fighter and bomber stations were attacked the following night.

In March, in response to the mine-laying, 39 AA Bde ordered 30th (Surrey) S/L Rgt to establish a mobile detachment to help the defenders engage these raiders. The 'Northern Rovers' and 'Southern Rovers', each of three sections, patrolled the north and south banks of the estuary.

On 31 March/1 April large numbers of enemy aircraft crossed the Humber Gun Zone (now referred to as a Gun Defended Area or GDA) and bombed the centre of the city. However, the most intense period of raiding (the Hull Blitz) occurred from 3 to 9 May. Many of the plotted raids flew straight on to bomb Liverpool, but several dropped their bombs on Hull as a secondary target. Fires started on 7/8 May drew enemy aircraft to the target, and many of the bombs were large parachute mines that caused widespread damage and many casualties across the city. Three further waves of bombers attacked the still-burning city the following night. The Northern Rovers detachment at Alexandra Dock was directly under some of the heaviest bombing and suffered casualties. Three or four aircraft were shot down on each night by AA guns or fighters cooperating with S/Ls. One detachment of 358 S/L Bty aboard the river barge Clem shot down a low-flying Heinkel He 111 with LMG fire.

The Blitz is generally considered to have ended on 12 May, but there was another significant raid on Hull on 28/29 May, mainly minelaying that caused the Humber to be closed to shipping for some time. The bombers were engaged by the Humber guns, night fighters, and S/L detachments, including that aboard Clem.

Even after the main Blitz ended, Hull was an easy target for inexperienced Luftwaffe crews and was frequently bombed and mined. Hull was badly hit again on the nights of 15/16 and 16/17 July 1941. A special S/L 'Dazzle Barrage' installed at Hull foiled at least one attack, in August 1941.

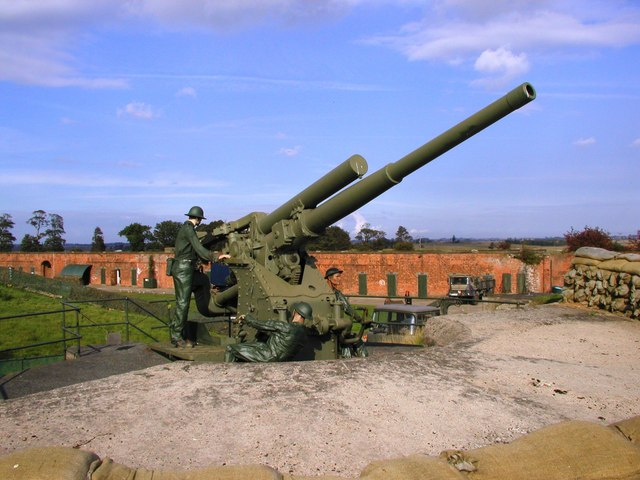
Static 3.7-inch HAA gun preserved at Fort Paull in the Hull GDA (Photo: Andy Beecroft).

=== Order of Battle Winter 1940–41 ===
The brigade's composition during the Blitz was as follows:

- 1st HAA Rgt
  - 1 HAA Bty – attached to Humber Gun Zone until 23 March 1941
- 62nd HAA Rgt – Humber Gun Zone
  - 172, 173, 266 HAA Btys
  - 407 HAA Bty – joined 10 April; to Birmingham 19 May 1941
  - 242 Bty – attached from 77th (Welsh) HAA Rgt, 26 March; to Southend-on-Sea 19 May 1941
- 91st HAA Rgt – Humber Gun Zone
  - 221 HAA Bty – attached to 2 AA Division until February 1941
  - 270, 286 HAA Btys
  - 395 HAA Bty – joined 10 March 1941
- 39th LAA Rgt – formed at Lincoln 1939
  - 72 LAA Bty – attached from 103rd LAA Rgt 26 May 1941
  - 109 LAA Bty – Paull, Spurn, Doncaster, Kirton in Lindsey
  - 110 LAA Bty – Scunthorpe
  - 111 LAA Bty – North Coates, Immingham, Grimsby
  - 103 LAA Bty – attached from 26th LAA Rgt 26 May 1941

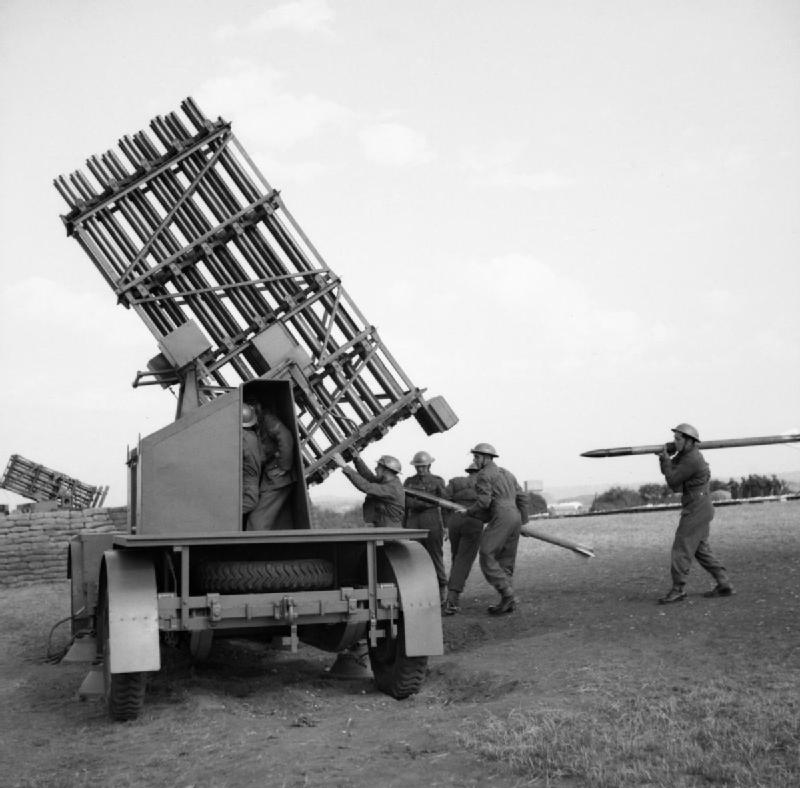
RA gunners load a mobile multiple launcher, June 1941.

- 30th (Surrey) S/L Rgt – left 29 March 1941
  - 315, 316, 318, 323 S/L Btys
  - 370 S/L Bty – attached from 43rd S/L Rgt from 12 May 1941
  - 511 S/L Bty – attached from 58th S/L Rgt until 12 May 1941
- 40th S/L Rgt
  - 358, 359, 360, 361 S/L Btys
- 46th S/L Rgt – to 7 AA Division by May 1941
- 84th S/L Rgt – new regiment formed December 1940
  - 512, 517, 518, 519 S/L Btys
- 2 AA 'Z' Rgt
  - 119 Z Bty – joined Spring 1941
  - 121 Z Bty – New Holland, Hibaldstow
- 1 Z Bty – Skegness

At the end of March 1941, 30th S/L Rgt was sent to help in the Bristol Blitz, handing over its Northern and Southern Rover duties to 84th S/L Rgt, which had been training alongside the 30th since January. Two of 30th S/L Rgt's batteries then embarked for the Middle East, but were diverted to the Far East where they were captured at the Fall of Singapore. 30th S/L Rgt returned to 39th AA Bde in October 1941.

6th HAA Regiment, a mobile unit under training before deployment overseas, took up temporary positions along the coast around Hornsea and Leconfield under the command of the Hull GDA in July. Similarly, 80th (Berkshire) HAA Rgt of the War Office (WO) Reserve was attached to the brigade from November to March 1942. Additional guns, including more Bofors for airfield defence, became available during the autumn of 1941, resulting in much shuffling of LAA units.

== Mid-war ==
Formation sign of 10 AA Division, worn by all personnel 1940–42.

During 1941 the searchlight layout over the Midlands and South Yorkshire was reorganised, so that any hostile raid approaching the GDAs around the towns had to cross more than one searchlight belt, and then within the GDAs the concentration of lights was increased. By October 1941 the availability of SLC radar was sufficient to allow AA Command's S/L sites to be 'declustered' into single-light sites spaced at 10,400-yard intervals in 'Indicator Belts' in the approaches to the GDAs, and 'Killer Belts' at 6000-yard spacing to cooperate with the RAF's night-fighters. 39 AA Brigade carried this out in November 1941.

In February 1942, Brigadier Frith was promoted to command 4th AA Division. He was replaced by Brig A.M. Cameron, MC.

=== Order of Battle 1941–42 ===
During this period the brigade was composed as follows (temporary attachments omitted):

- 62nd HAA Rgt – to WO Control February 1942
  - 172, 173, 266, 407 HAA Btys
- 91st HAA Rgt – to 65 AA Bde 21 April 1942
  - 221, 286, 395 HAA Btys
  - 270 HAA Bty – to 106th HAA Rgt in 2 AA Division December 1941
  - 421, 478 HAA Btys – joined December 1941
- 113th HAA Rgt – from 2 AA Division February 1942; to 65 AA Bde 21 April 1942
  - 366, 391, 439 HAA Btys
- 29th LAA Rgt – from 4 AA Division 26 February 1942; to 65 AA Bde April 1942'
  - 108, 121, 237 LAA Btys
- 39th LAA Rgt – to 4 AA Division 1 August 1941
  - 109, 110, 111 LAA Btys
- 78th LAA Rgt – new regiment formed June 1941; joined 1 August 1941; left AA Command March 1942 and arrived in India by August 1942
  - 236, 238, 241 LAA Btys
  - 265 LAA Bty – attached from 45th LAA Rgt in 9 AA Division, January 1942
  - 304 LAA Bty – attached from new 98th LAA Rgt January 1942
  - 469 LAA Bty – new Bty joined February 1942
- 82nd LAA Rgt – from 2 AA Division 15 March 1942
  - 102, 216, 282, 473 LAA Btys
- 109th (Royal Sussex Regiment) LAA Rgt – new unit formed by conversion of 7th Bn, Royal Sussex Regiment January 1942, joined 24 March 1942
  - 358, 359 LAA Btys
- 30th S/L Rgt – rejoined October 1941, then to 11 AA Division January 1942
  - 323, 567 S/L Btys
- 40th S/L Rgt – as above
- 84th S/L Rgt
  - 370 S/L Bty – attached from 43rd S/L Rgt until 11 November 1941
  - 512, 517, 518, 519 S/ Btys
- 2nd AA 'Z' Rgt – to 65 AA Bde May 1942
  - 119, 121 Z Btys
- 1 AA Z Bty
- 39 AA Brigade Signal Office Mixed Sub-Section (part of No 2 Company, 10 AA Division Mixed Signal Unit, Royal Corps of Signals (RCS))

All of these regiments left the brigade during the mid-war period and were replaced by war-formed units. The first to leave was 91st HAA Rgt, which went to the Middle East in October 1942 serving under Ninth Army, and later under Eighth Army in Italy. 62nd HAA, 39th LAA and 30th S/L Rgts all embarked for North Africa in November 1942, joining Allied Force Headquarters in January 1943 for the Tunisian Campaign and later in Italy.

=== Reorganisation ===
On 21 April 1942 39 AA Bde was reorganised as a Light AA brigade, handing over its HAA commitments to 65 AA Bde but retaining its LAA and S/L units:

- 82nd LAA Rgt – at Scunthorpe; left 5 May 1942
- 40th S/L Rgt – at Elsham, then to Sutton-on-Hull
- 84th S/L Rgt – at Worksop
- 121st (Leicestershire Regiment) LAA Rgt – converted from 44th S/L Rgt (see above) January 1942, rejoined from 62 AA Bde 20 April 1942, at Scunthorpe
  - 396, 397, 398, 399 LAA Btys
- 114 Sector Operations Room (SOR) – RAF Kirton in Lindsey

The Luftwaffe began its so-called Baedeker Blitz in April 1942: an attack was launched against Hull on 19 May, but a fire kindled by incendiary bombs landing on an AA site outside the city distracted the bombers from their target. Another raid on 31 July was almost as ineffective.

Newly formed units continued to join AA Command, the HAA and support units increasingly becoming 'Mixed' units, indicating that women of the Auxiliary Territorial Service (ATS) were fully integrated into them. At the same time, experienced units were posted away to train for service overseas. This led to a continual turnover of units, which accelerated in 1942 with the preparations for the invasion of North Africa (Operation Torch) and the need to transfer AA units to counter the Baedeker raids, which also meant that 39 AA Bde had to make plans to relocate S/Ls to Sheffield (under the codename 'Cutlery', an allusion to the Sheffield Cutlery trade).

The AA divisions were disbanded in September 1942 and replaced by a system of AA Groups corresponding to the Groups of RAF Fighter Command. 39th AA Bde came under 5 AA Group based at Nottingham and affiliated to No. 12 Group RAF.

39 AA Brigade regained a HAA commitment in August 1942 with the transfer of 152nd (Mixed) HAA Rgt (519, 520, 524, 527 (M) HAA Btys) from 62 AA Bde. By October, under the new Group command, the brigade was once again responsible for Z batteries from 2nd AA 'Z' Rgt and additionally from 11th AA 'Z' Rgt and 16th (M) AA 'Z' Rgt; the HAA and Z batteries were in the Sheffield GDA, with a Gun Operations Room (GOR) at Rotherham.

At the end of 1942, 82nd LAA Rgt left for the Orkney and [Shetland] Defences (OSDEF), while 121st LAA Rgt and 40th S/L Rgt were rostered for overseas service and required to begin mobilisation, while remaining in AA Command. (40th S/L Rgt was converted into 149th LAA Rgt in June 1943 and first joined 55th (West Lancashire) Division and then Second Army, under which it served in the North West Europe campaign.) 41st and 42nd S/L Rgt arrived in January and February to relieve 40th and 84th S/L Rgts in a reorganised S/L layout and the brigade was also joined by 187th (M) HAA Rgt and 71st (West Riding) Home Guard HAA Bty.

=== Move South ===
However, 39 AA Bde HQ was ordered by 5 AA Group to hand over all its operational commitments to 57 LAA Bde and move to Great Yarmouth on 1 February, to take over the Yarmouth–Lowestoft–Norwich GDA. At the same time Brig W.H. Higgs took over from Brig Cameron as commander of 39 AA Bde. (Brigadier Cameron was later promoted to major general and commanded 6 AA Group.)

On arrival, the brigade HQ took command of the following units, formerly controlled by 41st (London) AA Bde:

- 161st (M) HAA Rgt
  - 447, 478, 558 (M) HAA Btys
  - 383 HAA Bty – attached from 86th (Honourable Artillery Company) HAA Rgt
  - 432 HAA Bty – attached from 136th HAA Rgt
- 126th (Middlesex) LAA Rgt
  - 415, 429, 430 LAA Btys
- 118 Independent Z Bty
- 425 S/L Bty from 58th S/L Rgt
- 333 GOR

Brigadier Higgs acted as AA Defence Commander (AADC) Yarmouth/Lowestoft GDA, the officer commanding (OC) of 432 HAA Bty as AADC Norwich, which formed a 'Baby GDA'. The Luftwaffe carried out occasional harassing raids in the brigade's area, including a damaging attack on the naval base at Yarmouth on 18 March

126th LAA Rgt departed for battle training on 3 April, and was relieved by 121st LAA Rgt, which rejoined the brigade after completing its own mobile training.

== 103 Anti-Aircraft Brigade ==
On 1 May 1943 the brigade was redesignated 103 Anti-Aircraft Brigade and formally became a component of the Field Force. It left 5 AA Group at the end of May, when it became part of the GHQ Reserve, but retained its defence commitments under AA Command. The commander was Brig E.E.G.L Searight, OBE, MC.

=== East Anglia ===
The reorganised brigade was joined by 109th HAA Rgt (taking over Norwich) and 123rd LAA Rgt (taking over various VPs from the neighbouring 41st AA Bde).

May saw a number of sneak night attacks by Luftwaffe bombers mingling with aircraft of RAF Bomber Command returning to their bases, and 'hit and run' daylight attacks by German Focke-Wulf Fw 190 fighter-bombers on Yarmouth and Lowestoft, which were engaged by the LAA guns. One such attack on 11 May hit the 103 AA Bde HQ ATS quarters, killing 26 ATS women and one gunner, in addition to 40 fatal casualties in Yarmouth. The following day, the Fw 190 attacks concentrated on 478 (M) HAA Bty's gun positions as well as Lowestoft town centre. The Yarmouth and Lowestoft defences were reinforced by moving detachments of 123rd LAA Rgt from guarding RAF stations and equipping them with 20 mm Hispano cannon.

=== Order of Battle, May–June 1943 ===
While in East Anglia, 103 AA Bde was composed as follows:

- 109th HAA Rgt
  - 342, 343, 344 HAA Btys
- 161st (M) AA Rgt
  - 447, 478, 593 (M) HAA Btys
- 121st LAA Rgt
  - 396, 397, 399 LAA Btys
  - 142 LAA Bty – attached from 142nd LAA Rgt
- 123rd LAA Rgt
  - 405, 408, 409 LAA Btys
- 469 LAA Bty – attached from 138th LAA Rgt
- 425 S/L Bty – attached from 58th S/L Rgt
- 188 Independent Z Bty

During June units were shuffled as they went for battle training or to other brigades within the field force, and additional LAA units arrived to defend the Norfolk coast. However, 103 AA Bde HQ left the area itself on 18 June, exchanging with 63 AA Bde and taking over that formation's commitments in Cornwall under 3 AA Group.

=== Cornwall ===
The brigade established its HQ at Feock and took over AA defence of Falmouth, Hayle, RAF Portreath, RAF Predannack, and RAF St Eval. Some of the units in the brigade area were components of the field force, others were still under AA Command. Of the 46 3.7-inch guns available to the HAA regiments, eight were static, but these were replaced by mobile ones, and 16 of the mobile guns were made available for training. Brigade HQ completed its mobilisation on 10 July and in November it practised setting up a mobile HQ in the field.

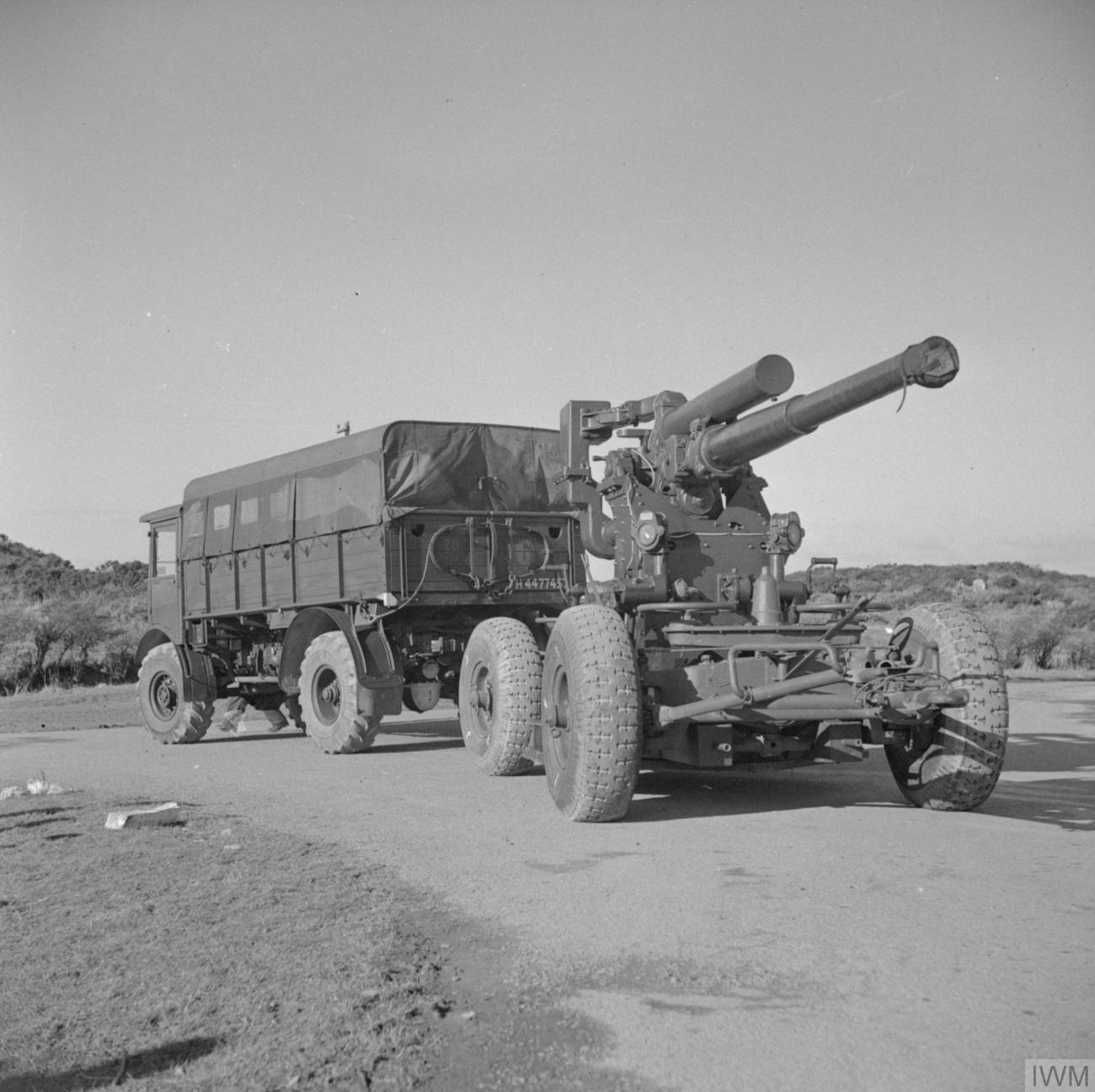
Mobile 3.7-inch HAA gun being towed by an AEC Matador during an exercise in the UK in 1944.

=== Order of Battle June–December 1943 ===
While in Cornwall the brigade was composed as follows:

Field Force units

- 12th HAA Rgt
  - 4, 18, 203 HAA Btys
- 110th HAA Rgt – joined before end of 1943
  - 345, 346, 354 HAA Btys
- 176th HAA Rgt
  - 595, 597, 599 HAA Btys
- 198th HAA Rgt – from battle training 1 July 1943
  - 634, 635, 636 HAA Btys
- 50th LAA Rgt – to 75 AA Bde 6 July 1943
  - 58, 93, 245 LAA Btys
- 139th LAA Rgt – from 101 AA Bde September 1943
  - 94, 177, 230 LAA Btys
- 150th LAA Rgt – from training 6 July 1943; to Leeds September 1943
  - 504, 505, 506 LAA Btys

AA Command units

- 177th HAA Rgt – to 57 AA Bde 29 July 1943
  - 596, 598, 600 HAA Btys
- 137th LAA Rgt
  - 326, 376, 462, 468 LAA Btys
  - 450 LAA Bty – attached from 135th LAA Rgt, July 1943
- 381 LAA Bty, 98th LAA Rgt – until July 1943
- 313 S/L Bty – attached from 29th (Kent) S/L Rgt until 3 July 1943
- 382 S/L Bty – attached from 46th S/L Rgt 3 July 1943
- 318 GOR Falmouth
- 209 SOR Portreath

137th LAA Regiment was withdrawn as the RAF Regiment progressively took over defence of air stations.

=== Overlord preparations ===
In December 1943, 103 AA Bde relieved 67 AA Bde at Weymouth, Dorset. 110th HAA Regiment moved to Lytchett Minster, with 346 HAA Bty at Holton Heath, 354 HAA Bty at Portland) and 345 HAA Bty detached to Salisbury. 176th HAA Regiment went to Oxford, and 198th HAA Rgt left, to be disbanded in April 1944. On 2 January 1944 the brigade was temporarily rejoined by 123rd LAA Rgt. It also had 161 AA Operations Room (AAOR) under command.

As well as guarding VPs such as the Royal Navy Cordite Factory, Holton Heath, and Portland Naval Base, the brigade became responsible for air defence of the area's growing encampments of troops (mainly US Army) preparing for the Allied invasion of Europe (Operation Overlord) and their landing craft gathering in Portland and Poole Harbours. On 19 March the brigade handed these responsibilities over to 69 AA Bde and moved to East Stour, Dorset, with its units ready to deploy as part of either Operation Overlord or Operation Diver, the defence scheme against the anticipated attacks by V-1 flying bombs. 176th HAA Regiment remained at Oxford while 110th HAA Rgt withdrew to Salisbury and Swindon; Bde HQ also had operational responsibility for the Home Guard-staffed Z Btys and LAA guns at these cities, and for composite LAA/SL batteries that were to defend the airfields of No. 85 Group RAF in Overlord.

In May, after the Slapton Sands Disaster (Exercise Tiger), 176th HAA Rgt was temporarily deployed to Slapton, Devon, to cover further US Army assault landing exercises. Brigade HQ moved to New Romney, with guns deployed to Littlehampton to guard 'Phoenixes' waiting to be used in constructing the Mulberry Harbour.

=== Order of Battle April–September 1944 ===
The brigade was now under the command of GHQ AA Troops for 21st Army Group, and from the end of April it had the following composition:

- 110th HAA Rgt
- 176th HAA Rgt
- 20th LAA Rgt – less two Btys with 76 and 80 AA Bdes for D Day landings
- 1 LAA/SL Bty (with 1689 Section, RASC, and Royal Electrical and Mechanical Engineers (REME) Workshops) – at RAF Hunsdon, later RAF Colerne
- 2 LAA/SL Bty (with 1690 Section, RASC, and REME Wkshps) – at RAF Newchurch
- 4 LAA/SL Bty (with 1692 Section, RASC, and REME Wkshps)– at Hunsdon from August
- 5 LAA/SL Bty (with 1693 Section, RASC, and REME Wkshps)– from August
- 557 Independent S/L Bty – from June; embarked July
- 1 Mobile S/L Troop, Canadian Army
- 161 AAOR (with Signal Section, RCS)
- 202 Fixed Defences
- 13 Fire Command Post
- 30 Coast Observer Detachment
- 103 AA Bde Signal Section, RCS
- 103 AA Bde Maintenance Detachment, REME
- 16 Radio Maintenance Detachment, REME

=== Operation Diver ===
Once Operation Overlord began on D Day (6 June), 103 AA Bde anticipated that it would begin to land in Normandy on D+37. However, the first V-1 'Divers' crossed the brigade's GDA during the night of 12/13 June, and two days later the guns at Littlehampton and Newchurch were heavily engaged. AA Command then put Operation Diver into effect, and mobile HAA batteries were redeployed to London from protecting the Overlord embarkation ports. 103 AA Brigade HQ went to Southend-on-Sea, 110th HAA Rgt to the 'Thames North' defences under 37 AA Bde and 176th HA Rgt to 'Thames South' under 28 (Thames and Medway) AA Bde. This deployment lasted until 13 September, when the brigade began to move to marshalling areas for embarkation.

== North West Europe ==
=== Channel Ports ===
Brigade HQ landed in Normandy on 14 September and by 23 September was established with its signal section and REME detachment at Le Havre, which had been captured in Operation Astonia. The attached units having left for other duties, the brigade kept 110th and 176th HAA Rgts and 161 AAOR under its command, and was joined by 73rd LAA Rgt (218, 220 and 296 LAA Btys with 1573 Pln, RASC), a mobile unit that had landed on D Day. However, there was dispute as to whether units at Le Havre were under US Navy or 21st Army Group control, and the brigade had to improvise its own support services, with the brigadier acting as military commandant of the town. The gunsites had to be cleared of mines and boobytraps before the guns could be emplaced (16 of the 48 HAA guns and the radar sets had still to arrive from the UK). Luckily, there was no Luftwaffe activity over the port, which began unloading ships on 2 October.

As 21st Army Group continued to advance, reductions in the defences required for rear bases and lines of communication enabled 103 AA Bde to hand over to US AA Artillery (AAA) units and move up in mid-October to relieve 76 and 80 AA Bdes at Dieppe and Boulogne:

Dieppe

- 103 AA Bde HQ (with Signals and REME)
- 110th HAA Rgt
- 176th HAA Rgt
- 139th LAA Rgt – already deployed at Dieppe
- 3 LAA/SL Bty
- 161 AAOR (main body)

Boulogne

- 103rd HAA Rgt
- 320 LAA Bty, 93rd LAA Rgt – equipped with triple 20 mm Polsten guns
- 395 LAA Bty, 120th LAA Rgt – already deployed at Boulogne
- 161 AAOR (sub-operations room)

The brigade soon learned to avoid selecting gun positions in the muddy battlefields, and if possible to re-use German gun positions with their elaborate dug-outs. The HAA units also supplied working parties to help unload shipping at Dieppe docks. In late October 176th HAA Rgt moved up from Dieppe to relieve 103rd HAA Rgt at Boulogne, 161 LAA Bty, 54th (Argyll and Sutherland Highlanders) LAA Rgt replaced 395/120th LAA Bty, and D Trp of 368 S/L Bty, 42nd (Robin Hoods) S/L Rgt, relieved 3 LAA/SL Bty.

Apart from a few aircraft trying to drop supplies by night to cut-off German troops, there was little Luftwaffe activity, and by mid-November the LAA strength could be reduced, with 161/54th and 230/139th LAA Btys moving into Belgium, and 1 LAA/SL Bty relieving 320/93rd LAA Bty. At the beginning of December the brigade HQ was ordered to move forward again, to Calais, with 176th HAA Rgt, 161 AAOR and 6 LAA/SL Bty, while 110th HAA Rgt, 139th LAA Rgt and D/368/42nd S/L Trp moved to Ostend under 75 AA Bde. The brigade was also responsible for 1 LAA/SL Bty, which moved back to Caen; in effect, 103 AA Bde now commanded all the remaining British AA troops in France.

In February 1945 the AA defences of Calais were closed down, and all the units moved up to join other HQs. Brigadier Searight was absent for a month in temporary command of 76 AA Bde. With no other duties and in view of the planned conversion of AA troops to infantry units for occupation roles in Germany, 103 AA Bde HQ moved to Hombeek, near Mechelen in Belgium, where it opened an infantry training centre.

=== Order of Battle March–April 1945 ===
On 5 March 1945, 103 AA Bde HQ relieved 5 Royal Marines AA Bde in the defences of Antwerp, with the following units under command:

- 110th HAA Rgt
- 155th (M) HAA Rgt
- 183rd (M) HAA Rgt
- 93rd LAA Rgt – rejoined from 7 April
- 114th LAA Rgt
- 139th LAA Rgt
- 161 AAOR
- 21 AA Wksp Co, REME
- 806, 845, 846 Smoke Companies, Pioneer Corps

It also had operational control of:

- 465 Bty, 146th HAA Rgt – from mid-March
- 10 and part 7 LAA Btys, 4th LAA Rgt
- 218/73 LAA Bty
- 7 S/L Bty, 1st S/L Rgt
- 411/54 S/L Bty
- No 4 Detachment, No 1 Local Warning (Radar) Trp, RA – until mid-March
- 159 Balloon Wing, RAF
- 601st AAA Gun Bn, US Army – until mid-March
- Two Btys 787th AAA Automatic Weapons Bn, US Army – 16 March to 6 April; equipped with M51 quad 0.5-inch
- Two Btys 789th AAA Automatic Weapons Bn, US Army – until 15 March
- 24th Chemical Smoke Generator Bn, US Army – until April

=== Antwerp X ===
Once again, the brigade was engaged against 'Divers', the vital port of Antwerp having been under attack from V-1s since the previous autumn and an elaborate defence set-up (Antwerp 'X') was in place. The HAA units began to be issued with No 10 Predictors (the all-electric Bell Labs AAA Computer) and GL Radar No 3 Mark V (the SCR-584 radar set), and the success rate against V-1s began to rise. A few high-flying jet aircraft dropped bombs, but the threat from aircraft was low, and the smoke screen was closed down on 14 March and LAA units redeployed elsewhere. The flying bomb onslaught against Antwerp lasted until the end of March.

Brigadier Searight was appointed to command a Line of Communication Sub-Area on 4 April and was temporarily replaced by Brig J.G.S. Ross, OBE, from 101 AA Bde, until Brig H.R. Harris arrived on 13 April.

=== Occupation duties ===
On 17 April, 50 AA Bde arrived at Antwerp to relieve 103 AA Bde, which became available for new duties. From 25 April it became 103rd Infantry Brigade, consisting of 110th, 111th and 176th HAA Rgts and 113th (Durham Light Infantry) LAA Rgt, all of which handed in their AA equipment and became garrison battalions, while 114th and 139th LAA Rgts disbanded. The brigade moved to Fallingbostel in Germany and took over occupation duties under Second Army, including responsibility for ameliorating the horrors of the newly liberated Belsen concentration camp.

When the German surrender at Lüneburg Heath was signed on 5 May the occupation troops were fully engaged in collecting, controlling and repatriating Displaced persons, released Prisoners of war, and surrendered German troops. The brigade was joined by 633rd Infantry Regt, RA (formerly 34th (Queen's Own Royal West Kent) Searchlight Rgt) on 6 May, and came under the command of 43rd (Wessex) Infantry Division. On 3 June the brigade (less 633rd Rgt) moved to Kreuztal under 49th (West Riding) Infantry Division and took over responsibility from US troops in the area. Later it moved to Allenbach.

176th HAA Regiment disbanded on 31 October, and 110th and 111th HAA Rgts on 4 February 1946. 103 Infantry Brigade HQ itself disbanded on 15 February.

== Commanders ==
The following officers commanded 39/103 AA Brigade during the war:

- Brigadier O.T. Frith appointed 29 September 1938
- Brig A.M. Cameron, MC, appointed February 1942
- Brig B.H. Higgs appointed February 1943
- Brig E.E.G.L Searight, OBE, MC, appointed 9 April 1943
- Brig J.G.S. Ross, OBE, appointed (temporary) 3 April 1945
- Brig H.R. Harris, TD, appointed 3 April 1945
- Brig A.D.G Orr, DSO, appointed 1 July 1945

== Postwar ==
When the TA was reconstituted on 1 January 1947, 39 AA Bde was reorganised as 65 AA Brigade, (Note: The TA AA brigades were now numbered 51 and upwards, rather than 26 and upwards as in the 1930s; the wartime 65th AA Bde was simultaneously renumbered 17 AA Bde in the Regular Army on 1 January 1947.) with its HQ at Doncaster, still forming part of 5 AA Group at Nottingham. It comprised the following units:

- 467 (The York and Lancaster Regiment) (Mixed) HAA Regiment, RA - ex-67 HAA, see above
- 557 (Kings Own Yorkshire Light Infantry) (Mixed) HAA Rgt at Doncaster - ex-57 LAA
- 513 LAA Rgt at Sheffield - ex-13 LAA, see above; redesignated 513 LAA/SL Rgt in 1949
- 553 (Kings Own Yorkshire Light Infantry) LAA Rgt at Doncaster - ex-53 LAA

('Mixed' indicated that members of the Women's Royal Army Corps were integrated into the unit.)

AA Command was disbanded on 10 March 1955, and there was a considerable reduction in the number of TA AA units. Within 65 AA Bde, 467 HAA merged with a field artillery regiment, 513 LAA merged into a light airborne artillery regiment, and the two KOYLI regiments merged with another Yorkshire LAA regiment. The brigade itself was placed in 'suspended animation' on 31 October that year, and formally disbanded on 31 December 1957.

== External sources ==
- The Royal Artillery 1939–45
- British Military History
- National Heritage List for England.
- Orders of Battle at Patriot Files
- British Army units from 1945 on
