= 80th Searchlight Regiment, Royal Artillery =

80th Searchlight Regiment, RA
- Royal Artillery cap badge
- Active: 5 October 1940 – 25 October 1945
- Country: United Kingdom
- Branch: British Army
- Type: Searchlight Regiment
- Role: Air Defence
- Size: 3–4 Batteries
- Part of: Anti-Aircraft Command
- Engagements: Coventry Blitz; Birmingham Blitz

80th Searchlight Regiment (80th S/L Rgt) was an air defence unit of Britain's Royal Artillery during World War II. It protected the United Kingdom as part of Anti-Aircraft Command from the Blitz of 1940 until it began to disperse in 1944.

== Origin ==
The regiment was created as part of the rapid expansion of anti-aircraft (AA) defences during the Battle of Britain. It was formed on 5 October 1940 with three batteries, 505, 506 and 507. After training, the new regiment joined 54th AA Brigade in the West Midlands alongside 45th (Warwickshire Regiment) S/L Rgt, a local Territorial Army unit. The brigade came under 11th AA Division when that was formed in November.

== The Blitz ==
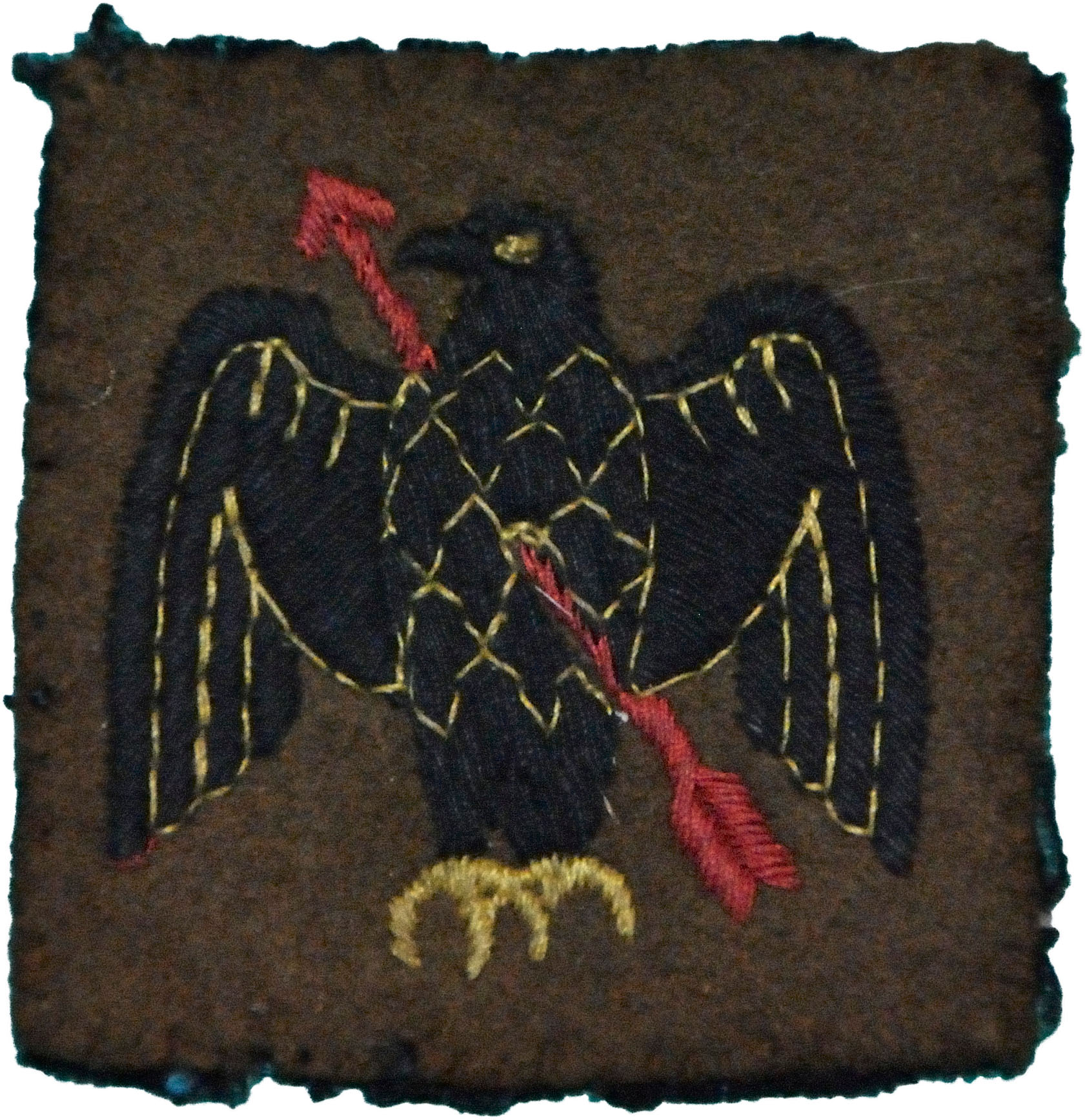
Formation sign of 11th AA Division.

By the time 80th S/L Rgt joined, The Blitz was in full swing, with frequent night air raids on Britain's industrial cities. The role of the S/L units was to track and illuminate raiders for the Heavy AA (HAA) guns of the Gun Defence Areas (GDAs) and for the few available Royal Air Force Night fighters. 54th AA Bde was responsible for S/L provision for the West Midlands GDA. In November 1940 AA Command changed its S/L layouts to clusters of three lights to improve illumination, but this meant that the clusters had to be spaced 10,400 yards (9,500 m) apart. The cluster system was an attempt to improve the chances of picking up enemy bombers and keeping them illuminated for engagement by AA guns or night fighters. Eventually, one light in each cluster was to be equipped with Searchlight Control radar (SLC or 'Elsie') and act as 'master light', but the radar equipment was still in short supply.

=== Coventry Blitz ===
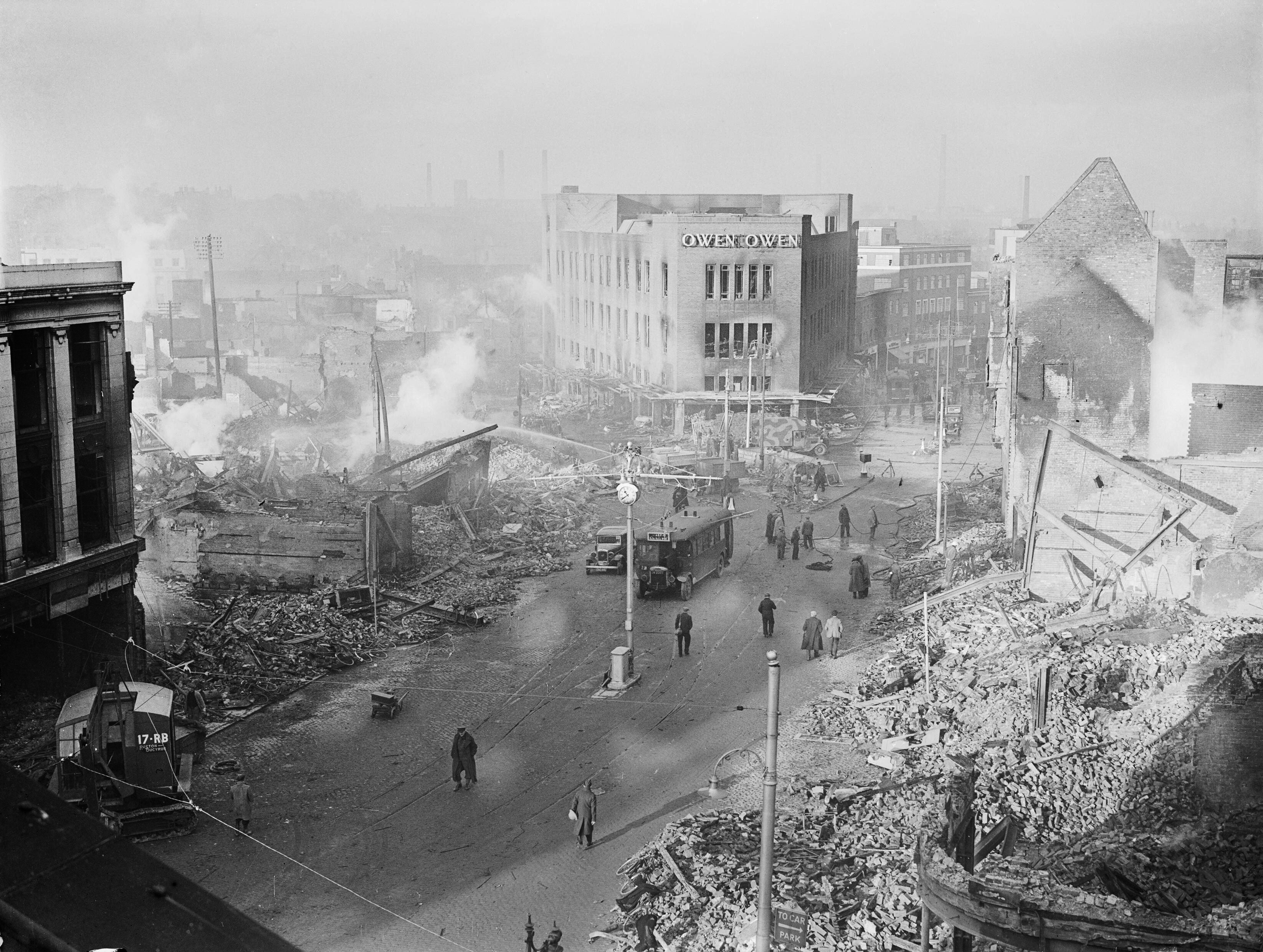
Coventry city centre following the 14 November air raid.

The new division was still being formed when the Luftwaffe launched a series of devastating raids, beginning with the notorious Coventry Blitz on 14/15 November. The Coventry raid was preceded by a dozen pathfinder aircraft of Kampfgeschwader 100 riding an X-Gerät beam to drop flares and incendiary bombs on the target. The huge fires that broke out in the congested city centre then attracted successive 40-strong waves of bombers flying at heights between 12,000 feet (3,700 m) and 20,000 feet (6,100 m) to saturate the defences. The AA Defence Commander had prepared a series of concentrations to be fired using sound-locators and GL Mk. I gun-laying radar, but the bombing severed all lines of communication and the noise drowned out sound-location. Some gun positions were able to fire at searchlight beam intersections, glimpsed through the smoke and guessing the range. The Coventry raid was followed by three consecutive nights (19–22 November) of attacks on Birmingham and other Black Country industrial towns including West Bromwich, Dudley and Tipton. The change in enemy tactics led to additional AA units being moved to the West Midlands.

=== Birmingham Blitz ===
Birmingham was bombed again during December (3, 4, 11) and on 11 March 1941, but the full Birmingham Blitz came in April 1941, with heavy raids on the nights of 9/10 and 10/11 of the month, causing extensive damage and casualties. The Blitz is generally held to have ended on 16 May 1941 with a last attack on Birmingham. By now the HAA sites had the advantage of GL Mk I* radar with an elevation finding (E/F or 'Effie') attachment to supplement searchlights, and several attackers were turned away by accurate fire and their bombs scattered widely, some on nearby Nuneaton. The city was attacked again in July, but the Luftwaffe bombing offensive was effectively over. The West Midlands had been the hardest hit area of the UK after London and Merseyside.

== Mid-War ==
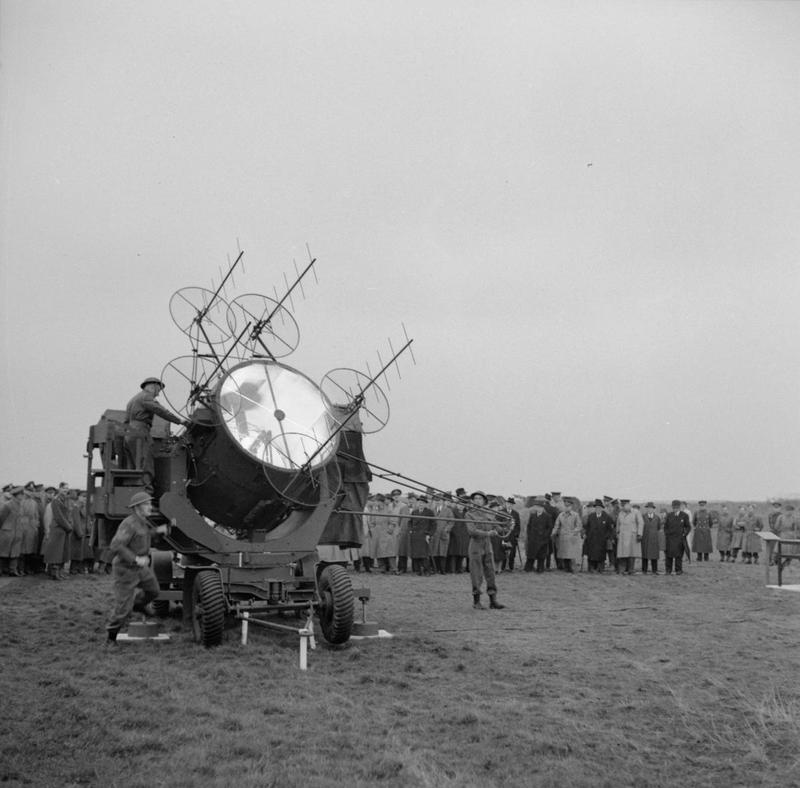
150 cm Searchlight fitted with No. 2 Mk VI SLC radar.

80th S/L Regiment remained in 54th AA Bde in 11th AA Division after the Blitz ended. During 1941 the searchlight layout over the Midlands was reorganised, so that any hostile raid approaching the GDAs around the towns must cross more than one S/L belt, and then within the GDAs the concentration of lights was increased. By October 1941 the availability of SLC was sufficient to allow AA Command's S/L sites to be 'declustered' into single-light sites spaced at 10,400 yards (9,500 m) intervals in 'Indicator Belts' in the approaches to the GDAs, and 'Killer Belts' at 6,000 yards (5,500 m) spacing to cooperate with the RAF's night-fighters.

The regiment continued in 54th AA Bde during the winter of 1941–42. 45th (Warwickshire Regiment) S/L Rgt had been selected for conversion to the Light AA (LAA) gun role in January 1942, and it handed over its S/L sites to 80th S/L Rgt during December 1941 and January 1942.

A reorganisation of AA Command in October 1942 saw the AA divisions disbanded and replaced by a smaller number of AA Groups more closely aligned with the groups of RAF Fighter Command. Thus 11th AA Division merged with 4th AA Division into 4 AA Group based at Preston and cooperating with No. 9 Group RAF.

Though other units came and went, 80th S/L Rgt remained with 54th AA Bde until September 1943, when it transferred to 60th AA Bde covering the area of Exeter, Yeovil and Portland under 3 AA Group in the West Country. With the lower threat of attack by the weakened Luftwaffe, AA Command was being forced to release manpower for the planned invasion of Normandy (Operation Overlord). All Home Defence S/L regiments were reduced from February 1944, and 80th S/L Rgt lost 507 S/L Bty, which began to disband on 7 February, the process being completed by 28 February. At the same time the regiment moved to 57th AA Bde in 5 AA Group covering North East England. In April it moved again, this time to 49th AA Bde in 1 AA Group in the London Inner Artillery Zone (IAZ).

=== Operation Diver ===
On 13 June, a week after 'Overlord' had begun with the D Day landings, the first V-1 flying bombs ('Divers') were launched towards London. It was important to shoot these down before they reached the IAZ – indeed, there a ban on AA fire from the IAZ because the crashes caused so much additional damage – so there was little role for the London searchlights during the anti-V-1 campaign (Operation Diver). However, AA Command employed thousands of S/L crewmen to erect gun platforms for AA guns to be redeployed in a 'Diver' belt along the South Coast. The first 'Diver' campaign ended in September after 21st Army Group overran the launch sites in Northern France.

== Disbandment ==
90 cm 'Projector Anti-Aircraft', displayed at Fort Nelson, Hampshire

The War Office had warned in June 1944 that AA Command would have to release manpower to provide reinforcements to 21st Army Group fighting in North West Europe. The run-down began in the autumn, and 80th S/L Rgt was one of those affected. Regimental HQ with 505 and 506 S/L Btys began to disband at 11th AA Practice Camp at Stiffkey in North Norfolk on 23 September 1944. However, this was a protracted business – large numbers of surplus S/L crewmen were again employed during the autumn to erect platforms and huts for the AA guns redeployed to deal with the resurgence of 'Diver' attacks from across the North Sea. In fact, the regiment was still in existence on 1 January 1945 when it was at Hatfield Militia Camp near Doncaster under the command of 32nd (Midland) AA Bde. Here it was joined by 72nd (Middlesex) and 82nd S/L Rgts. The personnel of these regiments were each reduced to battery strength and consolidated under the command of RHQ 72nd S/L Rgt. These batteries entered suspended animation between 3 April and 26 June 1945, but the residues of RHQ 80th S/L Rgt and 506 and 507 S/L Btys did not complete their disbandment until 25 October.
