= 41st (London) Anti-Aircraft Brigade =

41st (London) Anti-Aircraft Brigade 67 Anti-Aircraft Brigade
- Active: 29 September 1938 – 31 October 1955
- Country: United Kingdom
- Branch: Territorial Army
- Type: Anti-Aircraft Brigade
- Role: Air Defence
- Part of: 2nd AA Division; 5 AA Group; 1 AA Group
- Garrison/HQ: Ebury Street, London; Shepherd's Bush, London
- Engagements: Battle of Britain; The Blitz

The 41st (London) Anti-Aircraft Brigade (41 AA Bde) was an air defence formation of Anti-Aircraft Command in the British Territorial Army, formed shortly before the outbreak of the Second World War. Its role was to defend East Anglia.

== Mobilisation ==
The brigade was formed on 29 September 1938 at Ebury Street, London, as part of 2nd Anti-Aircraft Division. The first brigade commander was Brigadier Arthur Pollock, OBE, appointed 1 October 1938.

While the brigade was forming the TA's AA units had been mobilised on 23 September 1938 during the Munich Crisis, with units manning their emergency positions within 24 hours, even though many did not yet have their full complement of men or equipment. The emergency lasted three weeks, and they were stood down on 13 October. In February 1939 the existing AA defences came under the control of a new Anti-Aircraft Command. In June, as the international situation worsened, a partial mobilisation of the TA was begun in a process known as 'couverture', whereby each AA unit did a month's tour of duty in rotation to man selected AA gun and searchlight positions. On 24 August, ahead of the declaration of war, AA Command was fully mobilised at its war stations.

=== Order of Battle 1939–40 ===
90 cm 'Projector Anti-Aircraft', displayed at Fort Nelson, Portsmouth

By the outbreak of war on 3 September 1939, 41 AA Bde had the following units under command:

- 32nd (7th City of London) Anti-Aircraft Battalion, Royal Engineers – searchlight unit formed in 1935 by conversion of 7th London Regiment and transfer to the Royal Engineers (RE)
  - 328, 329 & 330 AA Companies RE
- 1/6th Battalion, Essex Regiment (64th Searchlight Regiment) – formed in 1938 by conversion of infantry battalion
  - 441, 442 & 443 AA Companies
- 2/6th Battalion, Essex Regiment (65th Searchlight Regiment) – formed in 1938 by conversion of duplicate infantry battalion
  - 444, 445 & 446 AA Companies
- 78th (1st East Anglian) Heavy Anti-Aircraft Regiment, Royal Artillery – formed in 1938 by conversion of 84th (1st East Anglian) Field Regiment, RA
  - 243 (2nd Norfolk) AA Battery
  - 244 (3rd Norfolk) AA Battery
  - 245 (1st Norfolk) AA Battery
  - 409 (Suffolk) AA Battery
- 41 AA Brigade Company Royal Army Service Corps

== Battle of Britain and Blitz ==
Although based in London, the brigade's war station was in East Anglia, and its units deployed across the region on the outbreak of the Second World War. The first months of the war were quiet, but on the night of 7/8 June 1940, 32nd AA Battalion was the first searchlight unit to bring down an enemy aircraft, the crew of a Heinkel He 115 coastal reconnaissance aircraft being dazzled by a detachment at Rendelsham and crashing nearby.

By the summer of 1940, all TA searchlight regiments had been transferred to the Royal Artillery (RA), and AA regiments had been redesignated Heavy Anti-Aircraft (HAA) to distinguish them from the new Light Anti-Aircraft (LAA) regiments being formed. At this stage of the war 40 AA Bde operated as a 'light' AA brigade composed of S/L and LAA units, but in July a section of 286 HAA Bty from 91 HAA Rgt in the Humber Gun Zone was sent to the brigade to man two semi-mobile 3-inch guns to defend RAF Horsham St Faith under 29th LAA Rgt. As more LAA units became available, they were distributed to defend Vulnerable Points (VPs) such as airfields, which were attacked during the Battle of Britain. AA 'Z' Regiments were also formed, equipped with Z Battery rocket projectiles.

The S/L layouts had been based on a spacing of 3,500 yards (3,200 m), but due to equipment shortages this had been extended to 6,000 yards (5,500 m). As the German Luftwaffe switched to night raids against London and other cities (The Blitz), the S/L layout was changed in November to clusters of three lights to improve illumination, but this meant that the clusters had to be spaced 10,400 yards (9,500 m) apart. The cluster system was an attempt to improve the chances of picking up enemy bombers and keeping them illuminated for engagement by AA guns or RAF Night fighters. Eventually, one light in each cluster was to be equipped with searchlight control (SLC or 'Elsie') radar and act as 'master light', but the radar equipment was still in short supply. The number of raiders shot down steadily increased until mid-May 1941, when the Luftwaffe scaled down its attacks.

=== Order of Battle 1940–41 ===
41 AA Brigade had the following organisation during this period:

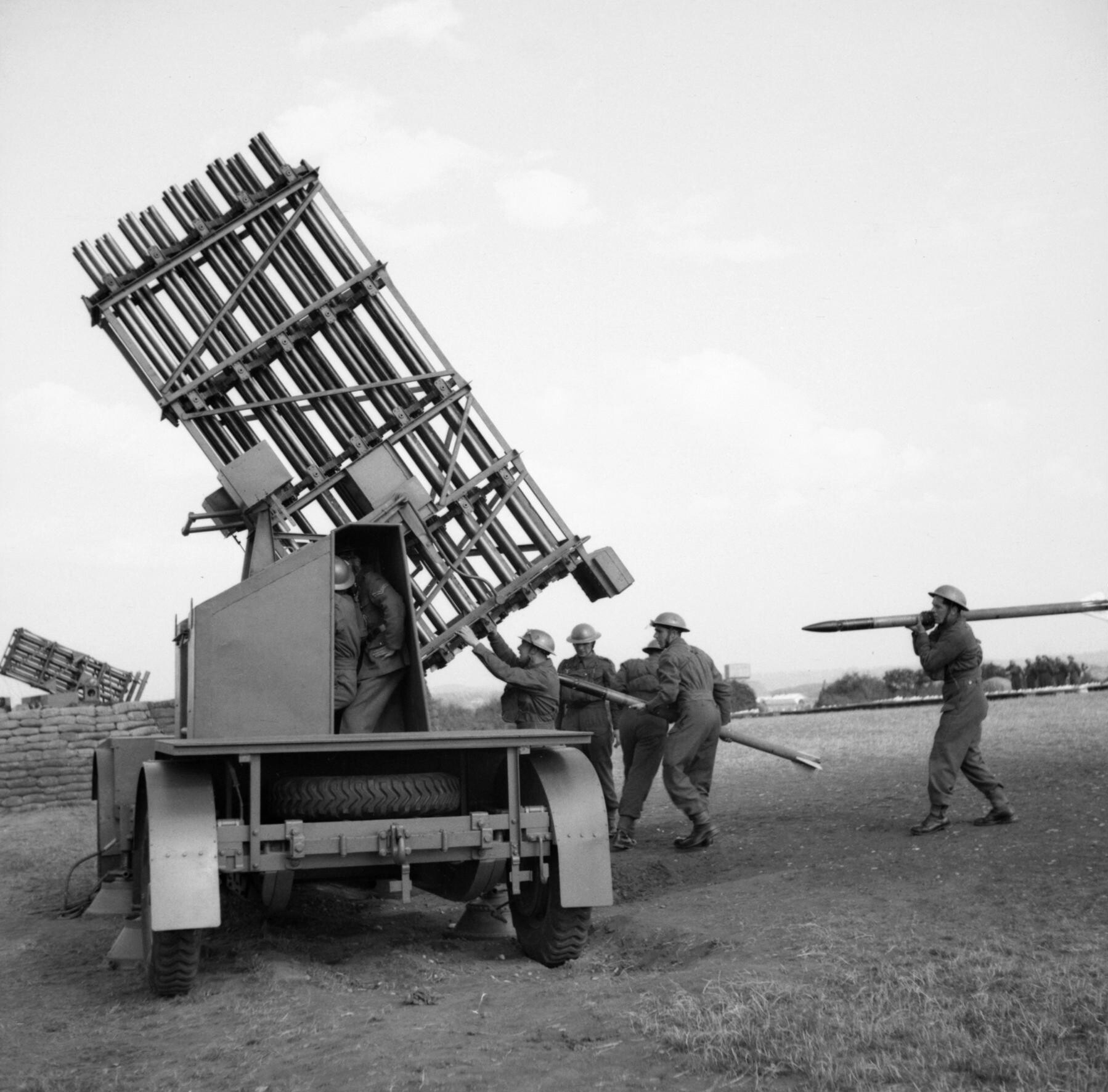
Loading a mobile multiple 4-inch Z projector 18 June 1941.

- 78th (1st East Anglian) HAA Regiment (part) – returned from 40 AA Bde Summer 1941
  - 243, 244, 245, 409 HAA Btys
- 29th LAA Regiment – new unit being formed in Lincolnshire on the outbreak of war; joined 41 AA Bde in October 1939
  - 108, 121 LAA Btys
  - 126 LAA Bty – left Summer 1941
  - 237 LAA Bty – joined Summer 1941
- 60th (Middlesex) Searchlight Regiment – formed in 1938 by conversion of 9th Battalion, Middlesex Regiment
  - 429, 430, 431 S/L Btys
- 65th (Essex Regiment) Searchlight Regiment
  - 444, 445, 446 S/L Btys
- 69th (3rd City of London) Searchlight Regiment – formed in 1938 by conversion of 10th (3rd City of London) Battalion, Royal Fusiliers
  - 456, 457, 458 S/L Btys
- 121 AA 'Z' Bty – joined by May, left June 1941

== Mid-War ==
2 AA Divisional formation sign, worn 1940–42.

In the summer of 1941, AA Command began to receive purpose-built SLC radar in sufficient numbers to allow some S/Ls to be 'declustered' into single-light sites. These were redeployed into 'Indicator Belts' of radar-controlled S/L clusters covering approaches to the RAF's night-fighter sectors, repeated by similar belts covering AA Command's Gun Defence Areas (GDAs). Inside each belt was a 20-mile deep 'Killer Belt' of single S/Ls spaced at 6,000 yards (5,500 m) intervals in a 'Killer Belt' cooperating with night-fighters patrolling defined 'boxes'. The pattern was designed to ensure that raids penetrating deeply towards the Midlands GDAs would cross more than one belt, and the GDAs had more S/Ls at close spacing. The number of LAA units to protect VPs was growing, albeit slowly.

At this stage of the war, experienced units were being posted away to train for service overseas. This led to a continual turnover of units, which accelerated in 1942 with the preparations for the invasion of North Africa (Operation Torch) and the need to transfer LAA units to counter the Luftwaffe's hit-and-run attacks against South Coast towns that began in March 1942. However, newly-formed units continued to join AA Command, the HAA and support units increasingly becoming 'Mixed' units, indicating that women of the Auxiliary Territorial Service (ATS) were fully integrated into them.

=== Order of Battle 1941–42 ===
During this period the brigade's composition was as follows (temporary attachments omitted):

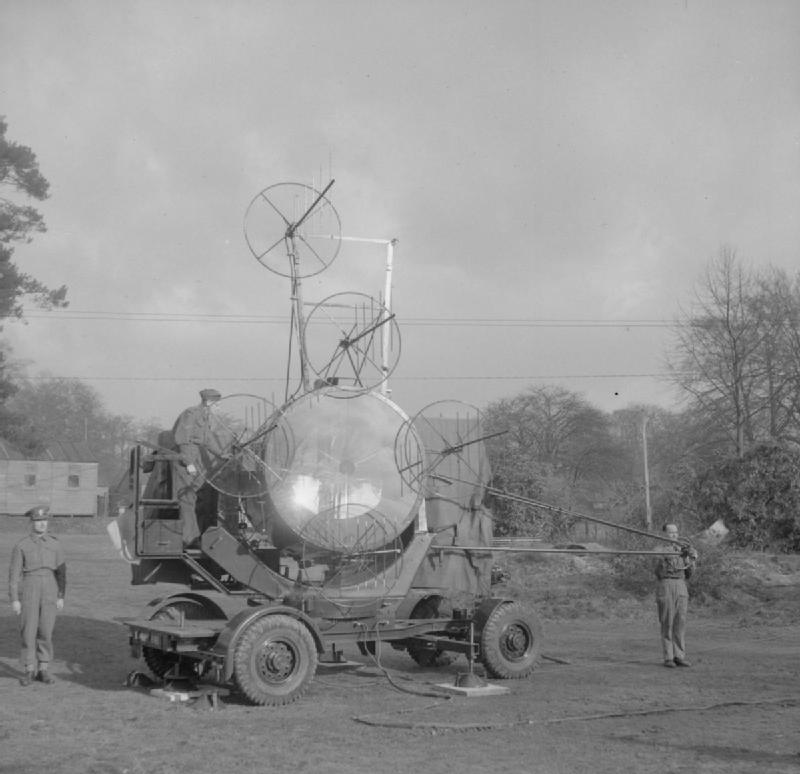
150 cm Searchlight with AA Radar No 2

- 78th HAA Rgt – left for Ninth Army in Middle East April 1942
  - 243, 244, 245, 468 HAA Btys
- 106th HAA Rgt – from 66 AA Bde May 1942; to 5 AA Division July 1942
  - 270, 327, 331, 332 HAA Btys
- 128th HAA Rgt – from 5 AA Division July 1942; to 10 AA Division August 1942
  - 287, 309, 407, 436 HAA Btys
- 161st (Mixed) HAA Rgt – new regiment formed June, joined August 1942
  - 447, 478 (M), 558 (M) HAA Btys
- 64th LAA Rgt – from 32 AA Bde May 1942; left June 1942
  - 191, 193, 285, 458 LAA Btys
- 82nd LAA Rgt – new regiment joined August 1942
  - 102, 216, 282 LAA Btys
  - 275 LAA Bty – left April 1942
  - 473 LAA Bty – joined February 1942
- 113th (Durham Light Infantry) LAA Rgt – converted from 55th S/L Rgt, joined April 1942
  - 368, 369, 370, 371 LAA Btys
- 126th LAA Rgt – converted from 60 S/L Rgt, joined May 1942
  - 415, 429, 430, 431 LAA Btys
- 60th S/L Rgt – to 32 AA Bde January 1942
  - 429, 430, 431 S/L Btys
- 69th S/L Rgt
  - 456, 457, 458, 561 S/L Btys
- 72nd (Middlesex) S/L Rgt – from 40 AA Bde late 1941
  - 465, 466, 467, 510 S/L Btys
- 41 AA Brigade Signal Office Mixed Subsection – part of 1 Company, 2 AA Division Mixed Signal Unit, Royal Corps of Signals (RCS)

== Later war ==
The AA divisions were disbanded in September 1942 and replaced by a system of AA Groups corresponding to the Groups of RAF Fighter Command. 41 AA Brigade came under 5 AA Group based at Nottingham and affiliated to No. 12 Group RAF.

=== Order of Battle 1942–43 ===
In this period the brigade's composition was as follows (temporary attachments omitted):

- 161st (M) HAA Rgt – to 63 AA Bde May 1943
  - 447, 478 (M), 558 (M) HAA Btys
  - 593 (M) HAA Bty – new bty joined February 1943
- 85th LAA Rgt – from 6 AA Group November 1942; unbrigaded February 1943
  - 52, 77, 136 LAA Btys
- 113th LAA Rgt – to 21st Army Group March 1943
  - 368, 369, 370, 371 LAA Btys
- 126th LAA Rgt – to 39 AA Bde April 1943
  - 415, 429, 430 LAA Btys
  - 431 LAA Bty – to new 144th LAA Rgt October 1942
- 134th LAA Rgt – from 4 AA Group November 1942; to 65 AA Bde May 1943
  - 192, 275, 287, 475 LAA Btys
- 139th LAA Rgt – from unbrigaded March 1943; to 21st Army Group Summer 1943
  - 94, 177, 230 LAA Btys
- 58th (Middlesex) S/L Rgt – from 32 AA Bde February 1943; to 57 AA Bde Summer 1943
  - 344, 425, 426 S/L Btys
- 69th S/L Rgt – to 3 AA Group Summer 1943
  - 456, 457, 458, 561 S/L Btys
  - 354 S/L Bty – from 39th (Lancashire Fusiliers) S/L Rgt January 1943
- 72nd S/L Rgt
  - 465, 466, 467, 501 S/L Btys
- 82nd S/L Rgt – from 3 AA Group Summer 1943
  - 483, 510, 525, 554 S/L Btys
- 41 AA Brigade Mixed Signal Office Section – part of 1 Company, 5 AA Group Mixed Signal Unit, RCS

== Operation Diver ==
By August 1943 the brigade only had two units under command (72nd and 82nd S/L Rgts), and this remained the case into 1944. By this stage of the war AA Command was being forced to make manpower cuts, releasing men to 21st Army Group for Operation Overlord, the planned Allied invasion of Normandy, and a number of S/L btys were disbanded: 72nd and 82nd S/L Rgts each lost one. 5 AA Group was now acting as a reserve: some units and formations left to join Overlord after D-Day in June, and when the long-awaited attacks on London by V-1 flying bombs ('Divers') began shortly afterwards), AA Command put into action its planned countermeasures (Operation Diver). This involved moving units and formations south from 5 AA Group, and 41 AA Bde was given additional responsibilities for some of the units left in place.

=== Order of Battle Summer 1944 ===
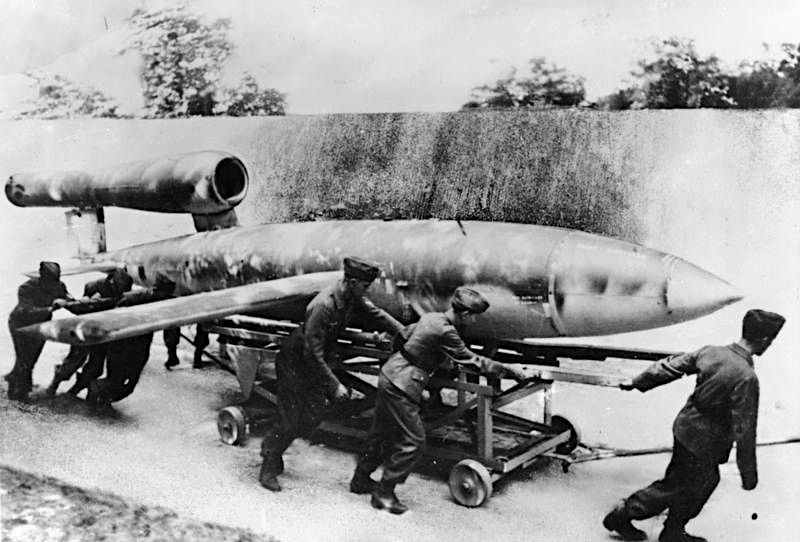
V-1 flying bomb being readied for launch.

The composition of the brigade during the period was as follows:

- 139th (M) HAA Rgt – from 63 AA Bde July 1944
  - 483, 484, 485, 518 (M) HAA Btys
- 151st (M) HAA Rgt – from 63 AA Bde July, to 30 AA Bde August 1944
  - 510, 511, 514, 516 (M) HAA Btys
- 172nd (M) HAA Rgt – from 65 AA Bde August 1944
  - 517, 570, 573 (M) HAA Btys
- 187th (M) HAA Rgt – from 63 AA Bde August 1944
  - 626, 644, 645 (M) HAA Btys
- 64th S/L Rgt – from 50 AA Bde July 1944
  - 441, 442, 443 S/L Btys
- 72nd S/L Rgt
  - 465, 466, 467 S/L Btys
- 82nd S/L Rgt
  - 483, 510, 525 S/L Btys

By October 1944, the brigade's HQ establishment was 10 officers, 9 male other ranks and 25 members of the ATS, together with a small number of attached drivers, cooks and mess orderlies (male and female). In addition, the brigade had a Mixed Signal Office Section of 1 officer, 5 male other ranks and 19 ATS, which was formally part of the Group signal unit.

== Diver Fringe ==
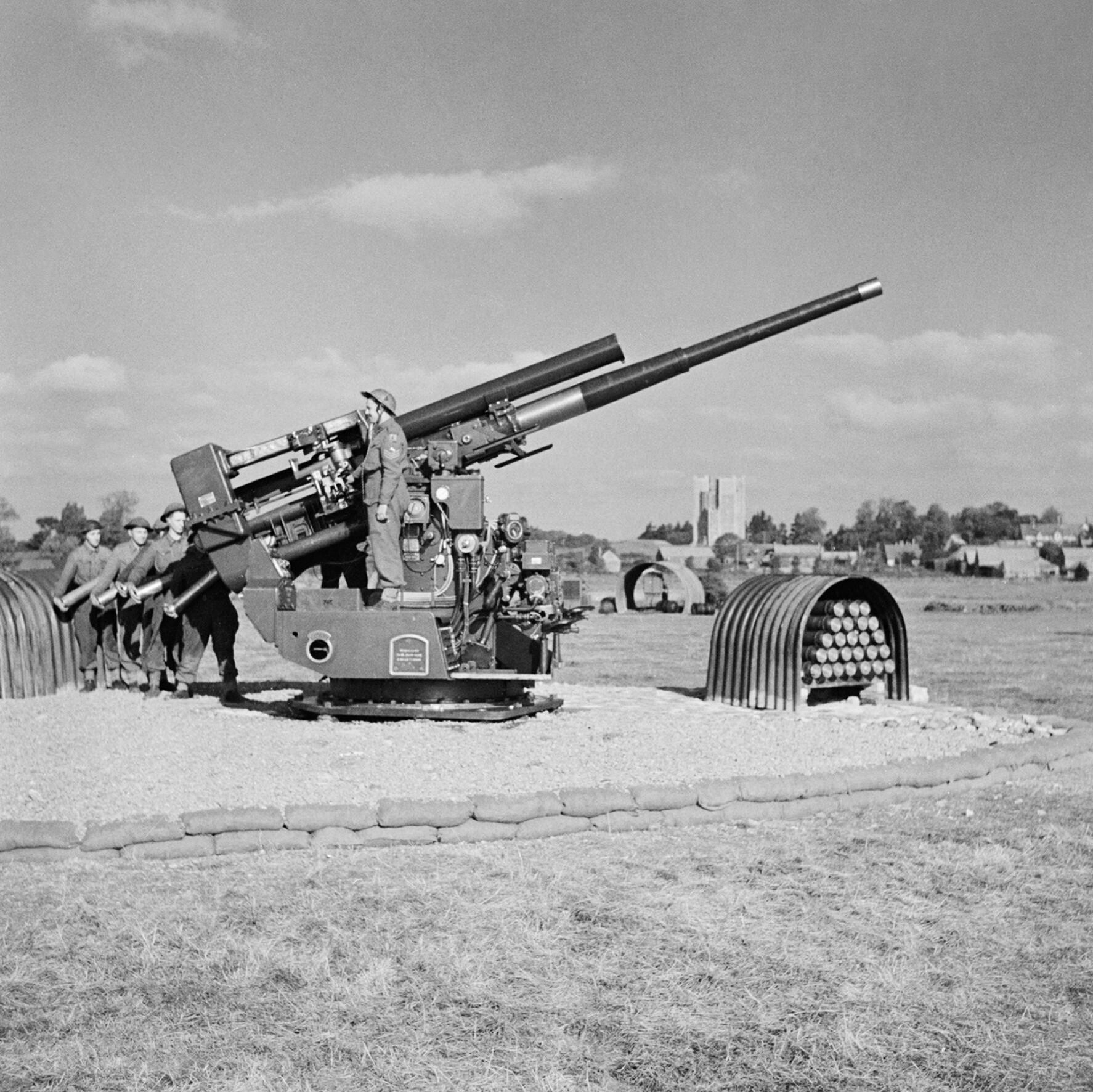
Static 3.7-inch gun on a Pile Platform, October 1944.

The first phase of V-1 attacks ended in September 1944 after 21st Army Group overran the launching sites in Northern France. In October, AA Command began planning to counter the expected attacks by air-launched V-1s coming in across the North Sea against targets on the East Coast and the Midlands. 41 AA Brigade was one of the formations deployed by 5 AA Group for this 'Diver Fringe' belt of defences. The brigade was reduced to a single regiment (172nd (M) HAA Rgt), but was tasked with reconnoitring and establishing 10 new AA gun sites from Donna Nook to Wainfleet along the Lincolnshire coast. Each site was to be equipped with six static 3.7-inch Mark IIC guns, with powered mountings, Predictor No 10 (the all-electric Bell Labs AAA Computer) and Radar No 3 Mark V (the SCR-584 radar set). The guns were emplaced on temporary 'Pile platforms' named after the Commander-in-Chief of AA Command, Gen Sir Frederick 'Tim' Pile. They were operated by 'Mixed' batteries, in which a high proportion of the personnel were women from the ATS. These batteries and their guns had to be scraped together from other parts of the country, together with huts to be re-erected for winter accommodation.

There was a pause in the V-1 offensive in December 1944, and 41 AA Bde was reduced to two AA Area Mixed regiments, composed of Z rocket batteries manned by the ATS and Home Guard. The Home Guard was stood down that month, and the brigade was left with almost nothing to command. However, on 24 December the Luftwaffe began launching the missiles across the Lincolnshire coast aimed at Manchester, and the Diver Fringe was activated with HAA and LAA batteries moving into 41 AA Bde's area. The brigade operated against air-launched V-1s until January, after which the Diver Fringe belt was also involved with Operation Trigger, engaging enemy intruder night-fighters.

=== Order of Battle Winter 1944–45 ===
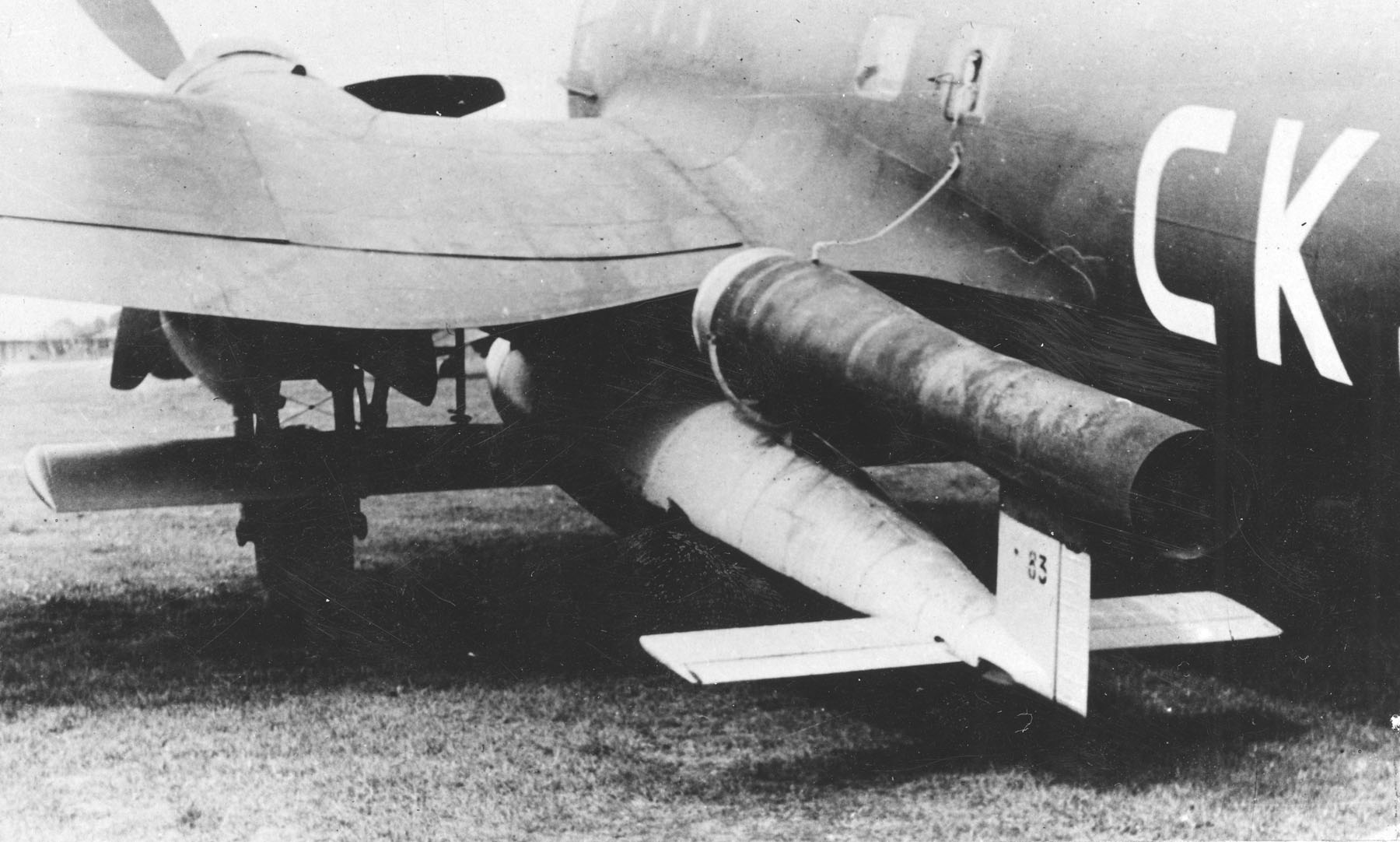
Air-launch V-1 loaded under a Heinkel He 111 bomber.

The composition of the brigade during the period was as follows:

- 144th (M) HAA Rgt – from 65 AA Bde December 1944
  - 497, 498, 503, 504 (M) HAA Btys
- 172nd (M) HAA Rgt – to 63 AA Bde November 1944
  - 517, 570, 573 (M) HAA Btys
- 182nd (M) HAA Rgt – from 32 AA Bde November; left December 1944
  - 588, 592, 594 (M) HAA Btys
- 67th LAA Rgt – from 9 AA Group December 1944
  - 200, 202, 279 LAA Btys
- 2 AA Area Mixed Rgt – joined November 1944
  - 146, 183, 209 (M) Z Btys – btys stood down December 1944
- 17 AA Area Mixed Rgt – joined November; stood down December 1944
  - 170, 206, 207, 225 (M) Z Btys

== War's end ==
As the war in Europe drew to its end in early 1945, demobilisation of AA Command proceeded rapidly as manpower was diverted to other roles. By February 1945, 41 AA Bde was reduced to commanding one of its former units (144th (M) HAA Rgt), together with one (9th (Londonderry) HAA Rgt) returned from the Italian Front. After VE Day, the brigade became responsible for a number of AA regiments in the Birmingham area awaiting demobilisation or engaged in agricultural work (147th (Glasgow) LAA Rgt), together with two 'Area AA Maintenance HQs'.

== Postwar ==
When the TA was reformed on 1 January 1947, the brigade's Regular Army units reformed 13 AA Bde at Coventry, while the TA portion was renumbered as 67 AA Bde, (Note: The TA AA brigades were now numbered 51 and upwards, rather than 26 and upwards as in the 1930s; the wartime 67th AA Bde was disbanded in 1945.) with its HQ at Shepherd's Bush and constituting part of 1 AA Group. It had the following units under command:

- 452 (London) HAA Rgt
- 453 (City of London) HAA Rgt
- 454 (City of London) HAA Rgt
- 488 HAA Rgt
- 608 (Kent) HAA Rgt
- 607 (Middlesex) S/L Rgt

The brigade was placed in 'suspended animation' on 31 October 1955, shortly after the abolition of AA Command, and formally disbanded on 31 December 1957.

== Online sources ==
- British Army units from 1945 on
- British Military History
- Generals of World War II
- Orders of Battle at Patriot Files
- Land Forces of Britain, the Empire and Commonwealth (Regiments.org)
- The Royal Artillery 1939–45
