= Dorsetshire and Wiltshire Fortress Royal Engineers =

British Territorial Army unit

Dorset & Wiltshire Fortress Royal Engineers 565th (Wiltshire) Army Troops Company, RE 82nd Searchlight Regiment, RA
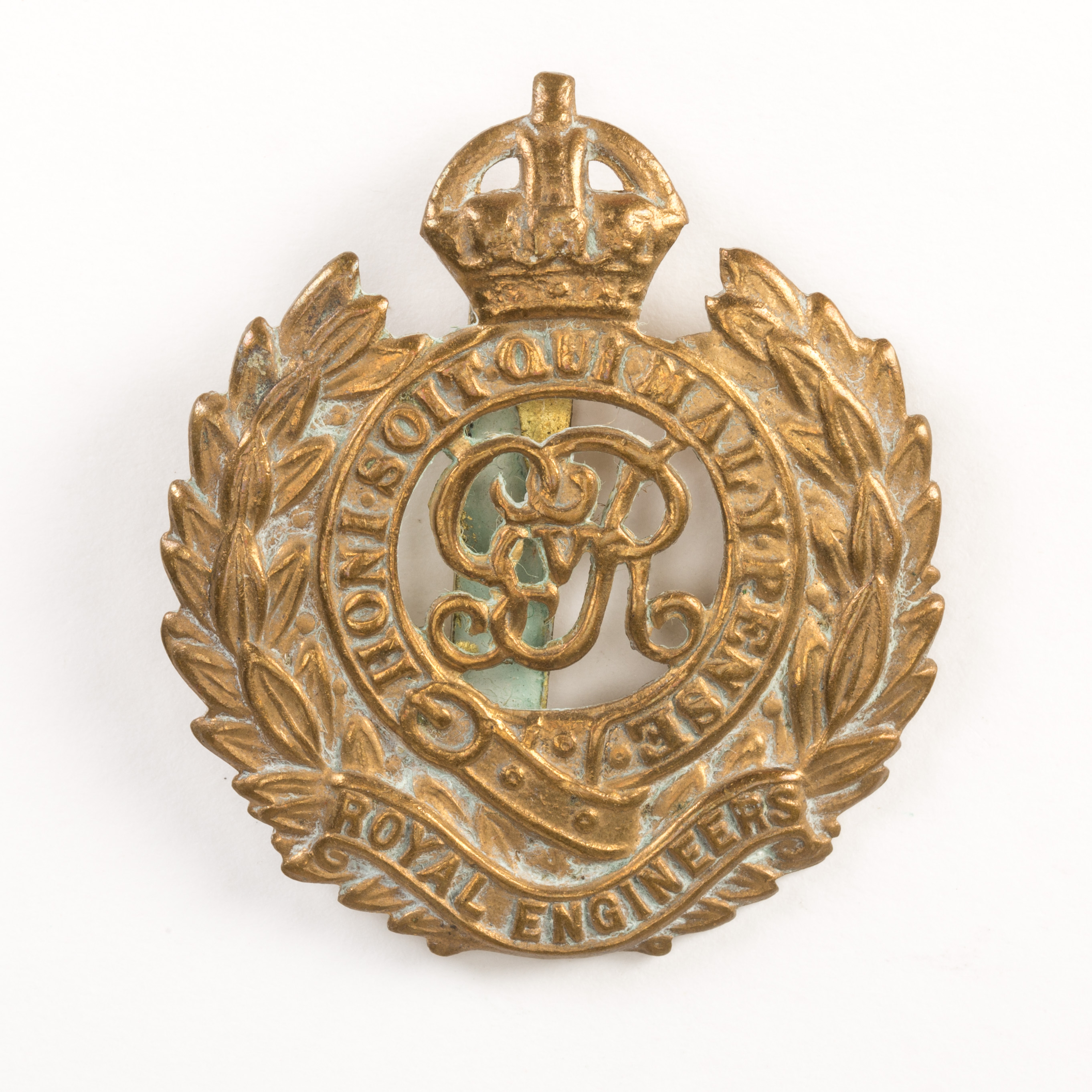
- RE Cap badge (King George V cipher)
- Active: 1908–1945
- Country: United Kingdom
- Branch: Territorial Army
- Role: Coast defence Air defence
- Part of: Southern Coast Defences; Anti-Aircraft Command
- Garrison/HQ: Weymouth/Swindon
- Engagements: Battle of the Canal du Nord; Plymouth Blitz

The Dorsetshire & Wiltshire Fortress Royal Engineers was a part-time unit of Britain's Royal Engineers formed in 1908. It helped to defend the naval base of Portland Harbour during World War I and provided a detachment to serve with the British Expeditionary Force on the Western Front. Between the World Wars the unit took on the additional role of anti-aircraft searchlight defence and during World War II it was expanded into a full searchlight regiment that served during the Plymouth Blitz.

== Origin ==
When the Territorial Force (TF) was created from the former Volunteer Force by the Haldane Reforms in 1908, it was organised with one or more Fortress Companies of the Royal Engineers (RE) in each of the coast defence commands. Where there were no pre-existing Volunteer RE units in the area new ones were raised. Thus the Dorsetshire & Wiltshire Fortress Royal Engineers were formed in Southern Coast Defences, primarily to operate the defences of Portland Harbour. Although formally separate units administered by different county Territorial Associations and with their own positions in the RE's Order of Precedence, the Dorset company at Weymouth (precedence 18) and the Wiltshire company at Swindon (precedence 11) were linked administratively and commanded by a single officer with the rank of Major.

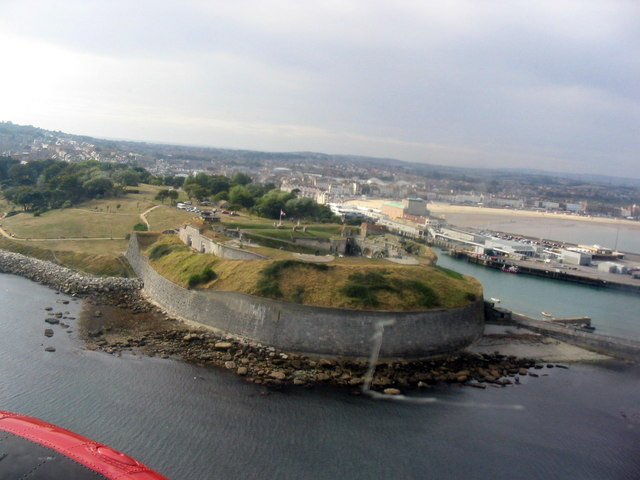
Nothe Fort from the air.

The Dorsetshire unit was an Electric Lights (EL) Company based at the Sidney Groves Memorial Hall on North Quay, Weymouth, but is also recorded as having used the Old Drill Hall at Easton, in Easton Lane on the Isle of Portland (now the Portland Sculpture & Quarry Trust), which it shared with No 3 Company of the Dorsetshire Royal Garrison Artillery. The EL Company operated two coastal defence (CD) searchlights (S/Ls) at Nothe Fort outside Weymouth and maintained and operated the generators, electric lighting and telephone systems of the fortress. The Dorsetshire Company was one of the few TF units (and the only Fortress Engineer unit) to be shown in the Army List to have volunteered for 'Imperial Service' prior to World War I.

The Wiltshire unit was a Works Company based at the Drill Hall, Church Road, Swindon, which it shared with a TF company of the Wiltshire Regiment and the 1st South Western Mounted Brigade Field Ambulance of the Royal Army Medical Corps (TF). It was almost entirely recruited from the Great Western Railway's Swindon Works.

== World War I ==
=== Mobilisation ===
On the outbreak of war in August 1914, the fortress engineers moved to their war stations in the coastal defences. The Wiltshire Company was undergoing its annual training at Fort Purbrook, Portsmouth, and went straight from there to Weymouth, where along with the Dorset company and work details from infantry battalions, it worked on completing the Portland defences.

Shortly after the outbreak of war, the men of the TF were invited to volunteer for Overseas Service and WO instructions were issued to form those men who had only signed up for Home Service into reserve or 2nd Line units. The titles of these 2nd Line units were the same as the original, but distinguished by a '2/' prefix. They absorbed and trained most of the recruits that flooded in, and supplied drafts to the units on active service. Some of the extra recruits for the Wiltshire companies came from the Weymouth area, most of the others from the GWR works.

=== Dorsetshire Company ===
Although the Dorsetshire company had volunteered for 'imperial' service before the war, there is no record of it going overseas as a formed body. Electric Light companies were in great demand at home to man the CD and later anti-aircraft (AA) S/Ls in the South Coast defences, but the Dorset company also trained and seconded officers to RE companies in the field.

=== Wiltshire Companies ===
However, the 1/1st Wiltshire Company did go overseas. The Portland defence works were completed by November 1914, and the men underwent a month of strenuous training, including heavy bridge building and constructing trenches at night. It then embarked aboard the SS Blackwell and arrived at Le Havre on 20 January 1915 to join the British Expeditionary Force (BEF) on the Western Front.

==== Ypres ====
The company first worked on a large defensive scheme for Saint-Omer in the rear area, then in April moved up to St Eloi in the Ypres Salient, where it constructed a trench along the Comines Canal and bored tunnels to serve as a covered way across the canal. This was done in hip-deep water and under constant rifle and machine-gun fire, and the company suffered its first casualties. Next the 1/1st Wilts was camped at Brielen, building huts along the Yser Canal to accommodate newly arriving divisions, but these huts came under German artillery fire and were destroyed. The company also repaired bridges over the canal, suffering casualties from the artillery fire. Eventually, having suffered 50 per cent casualties, the company was sent for rest to Danoutre, near Kemmel. Here part of the company spent June worked on defences while the railway machinists operated a sawmill and engineering works at Bailleul.

=== 565th (Wiltshire) Army Troops Company ===
In September 1915, the RE companies of the TF were renumbered:

- 565th (Wiltshire) Army Troops Co originally 1/1st Wiltshire (Works) Co
- 566th (Wiltshire) Works Co originally 2/1st Wiltshire (Works) Co

566th Company does not appear to have served overseas, but will have supplied drafts to front line units. The Wiltshire Fortress Engineers was not only a source of RE officers, but some of its men were commissioned as infantry officers in the Wiltshire Regiment

==== Somme ====
Reinforced, 565th (Wilts) Company spent the autumn and winter of 1915–16 building a new mill at Steenwerck and a hospital nearby at Trois Ambres, as well as working on roads, light railways and water supplies. The Battle of the Somme opened on 1 July 1916 and shortly afterwards 565th (Wilts) Co was moved into the area to camp at Bronfay Farm and work on water supplies in the Carnoy Valley. This work continued throughout the Somme offensive, and the company built a pumping station on the River Somme with a water pipeline to Trônes Wood after its capture. In the spring of 1917 the company was engaged in building a Corps HQ camp at Foucaucourt, then a new HQ camp for Fourth Army at Villers-Carbonnel near Peronne. This was in the devastated area beyond the old German front line after the German retreat to the Hindenburg Line (Operation Alberich). It then worked on five heavy steel bridges over the Somme at La Chapelette near Peronne.

==== Dunkirk ====
The Third Ypres Offensive was about to begin, and Fourth Army HQ was switched to Dunkirk to command a thrust up the coast to meet the expected breakthrough in Flanders. 565th (Wilts) Company was sent to fit out the Terminus Hotel at Leffrinckoucke, where some shelling was experienced. Detachments installed water tanks and pumps at Dunkirk docks, and constructed a musketry school near Abbeville.

==== Cambrai ====
In November 1917, the company was sent by lorry to Third Army's front, where the Hindenburg Line had been breached in the Battle of Cambrai. The company was put to work filling mine craters where the Hindenburg defences crossed the Bapaume–Cambrai road between the Canal du Nord and Graincourt. This was done under sporadic machine gun fire. The men next worked on new defences. After the German counter-attack, Company HQ was moved back to Ervillers, where the men worked in the forward areas on water supplies and building camps.

The German spring offensive of 21 March 1918 broke through in the Cambrai sector, followed by the 'Great Retreat', during which 565th (Wilts) Co found itself retreating by day and working on emergency defences with labour battalions by night. When the German offensive ran out of steam, the company was put to building a new defence line between Adinfer Wood and Fonquevillers on the old Somme battlefield. This involved repairing and linking up sections of old British and German trenches. One of the new trenches was named 'Swindon Trench' by the general commanding. During the summer, the company had two companies of the US Army Engineers attached to it for instruction.

==== Canal du Nord ====
The Allied counter-offensive (the Hundred Days Offensive) began in August 1918, and 565th (Wilts) Co followed the advance, opening up new water points, including an important one at Douchy. On 12 September, the company reached Ruyaulcourt where it was given the task of constructing a 300 feet (91 m) ramp down the face of a retaining wall into the dry Canal du Nord suitable for traffic up to 6-inch guns. This work had to be done under observation from a German Kite balloon, which called down shellfire on the construction site. The balloon was shot down, but at 16.00 on 18 September the Germans put in a counter-attack, preceded by a severe barrage. The company lost one officer and seven sappers killed, 22 wounded (two mortally).

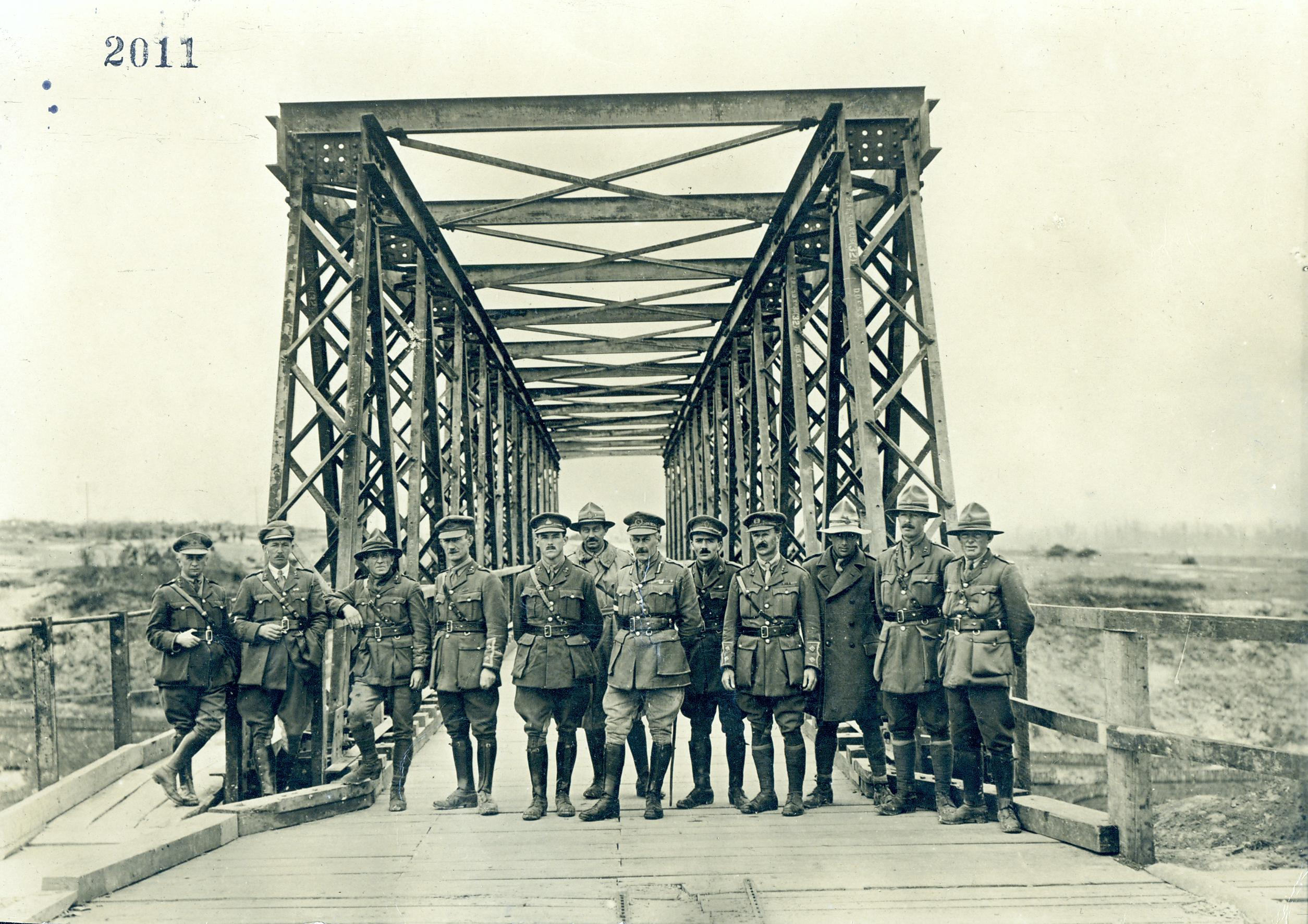
Officers of the New Zealand Tunnelling Company pose at the completed Hermies–Havroncourt bridge over the Canal du Nord, October 1918.

After these severe casualties, the company went for a week's rest at Boyelles. It was back at the Canal du Nord on 27 September with VI Corps Troops RE, where it was joined by the New Zealand Tunnelling Company. Together (14 officers and 310 men in total) they built a Hopkins steel bridge across the canal between Hermies and Havrincourt. (Note: Most sources and battlefield guides attribute the construction of this bridge to the New Zealand company alone, but see Gittins on the subject.) This was the largest heavy steel bridge erected on the Western Front during the war, with a span of 180 feet (55 m) above a 100 feet (30 m) deep gap; in total the bridge was 240 feet (73 m) long, launched by rollers. It took 80 three-ton lorry loads to bring up the material, and the total time to unload and erect the bridge was 104 hours. It was opened for traffic on 2 October.

As the Allied advance continued, the company was sent to Raches, where it worked on repairing heavy bridges in the Douai area, as part of First Army Troops RE, though a lack of materials made progress slow. On 10 November, a six-man detachment was working on the Douai railway bridge when a delayed-action German mine exploded, wounding the whole detachment. The company remained working in the area after the Armistice with Germany. It moved to Andenne on the Meuse on 8 January 1919, then to Troisdorf in Germany at the end of January. The company remained with the occupying troops of the British Army of the Rhine until it was disbanded on 19 November 1919.

== Interwar ==
When the TF was reorganised as the Territorial Army (TA) in 1920, both units were due to be reformed but the Wiltshire unit did not in fact reappear. By 1927 the Dorsetshire (Fortress) RE consisted of No 1 (Works) Company and No 2 (Lights) Company. At first it was back at Sidney Hall, but by the 1930s it was based at Bincleaves Barracks, close to Nothe Fort.

In 1934, the company carried out its annual training at the RE barracks at Gosport, and the Parkstone Section practised anti-aircraft (AA) searchlight defence at Rossmore Plateau every week, usually watched by a large crowd. During the 1930s, the need for increased AA defence for Britain's cities and ports became apparent. Before the outbreak of war in 1939, the Dorset (F) RE had reorganised into No 1 (Electric Light & Works) Company and No 2 (AA Company).

== World War II ==
90 cm 'Projector Anti-Aircraft', displayed at Fort Nelson, Hampshire.

=== Mobilisation ===
As the international situation worsened, key personnel of the unit were called up on 22 August, and the TA was fully mobilised two days later. In the first weeks of the Phoney War the CD light installations at Portland and the naval training establishment HMS Osprey were put into service, despite a lack of stores and a serious fire in the Nothe generator room on 10 September that burnt out the switchboard and cables. Portable Lister generators from the AA S/Ls were used as a temporary measure. Five AA S/L sections, each of six lights, were deployed around Weymouth and Dorchester, operating under the control of the Portland AA Gun Operations Room (GOR):

- No 1 Section HQ at Rylands, Weymouth
- No 2 Section HQ at Bincleaves, Weymouth
- No 3 Section HQ at Ridgeway, Weymouth
- No 4 Section HQ at West Stafford, Dorchester
- No 5 Section HQ at Chesil Croft

=== 483 Searchlight Battery, RA ===
By April 1940, 2nd (AA) Company Dorset (F) RE had been redesignated 483 S/L Company, RE, then on 1 August 1940 all the RE S/L units were transferred to the Royal Artillery (RA) and the company became 483 S/L Battery, RA.

Cap Badge of the Royal Artillery.

After the British Expeditionary Force had been evacuated from Dunkirk, there were intense air battles over the English Channel, and Portland was heavily bombed on 4 July. These were mainly daylight raids, to which the S/L sites could only contribute by plotting raids and manning their Light machine guns (LMGs) for local defence.

The Luftwaffe then switched the focus of its raids to the airfields of RAF Fighter Command, but after its defeat in the Battle of Britain it switched again to night raids on ports and cities (The Blitz). On 4 October, Battery HQ and two Troops of 483 S/L Bty were moved to join the Cornwall S/L Layout, primarily defending Plymouth under the command of 55th Light Anti-Aircraft Brigade, followed later by the rest of the battery.

=== 82nd Searchlight Regiment, RA ===
On 1 November 1940, 483 S/L Bty was joined by 510 S/L Bty from 222nd S/L Training Rgt at Taunton. This battery had been formed from new recruits around a cadre of experienced men supplied by 63rd (Queens) S/L Rgt. The two batteries together formed 82nd Searchlight Regiment under Lt-Col L.H. Crouch. The regiment became operational on 12 November under 55 AA Bde, now part of 8th AA Division. Regimental HQ and 483 S/L Bty HQ were first established at Hatt House, Saltash, and when that became crowded RHQ moved out to Hunsdon Lodge, Heavitree, and later to the Dreamland Road House at Sourton Cross near Okehampton.

483 Battery, together with 482 (Cornwall) S/L Bty, supplied a cadre to 232nd S/L Training Rgt at Devizes, where on 14 November they formed the basis of a new 538 S/L Bty. This battery later joined the newly formed 88th S/L Rgt at Topsham, near Exeter.

Formation sign of 8th AA Division 1940–42.

The S/L layouts had initially been based on a spacing of 3,500 yards (3,200 m), but due to equipment shortages this had been extended to 6,000 yards (5,500 m) by September 1940. In November, this was changed to clusters of three lights to improve illumination, but this meant that the clusters had to be spaced 10,400 yards (9,500 m) apart. The cluster system was an attempt to improve the chances of picking up enemy bombers and keeping them illuminated for engagement by AA guns or Royal Air Force Night fighters. 82nd S/L Regiment established 483 S/L Bty in clusters from 14 November, mainly deploying 90 cm S/L projectors with a few 150 cm units. 510 S/L Bty began to deploy on 1 January 1941, taking over a S/L area from the Royal Marines. Later that month, the clusters were redeployed in a ring around the Plymouth Gun Zone. In some clusters, one light was fitted with a green screen to act as a marker beacon for night fighters.

==== Plymouth Blitz ====
During the winter of 1940–41, Plymouth became one of the most heavily bombed cities outside London (the Plymouth Blitz). There were sizeable raids on 14, 21 and 22 March, then a big raid on the night of 21/22 April. The first phase of this raid consisted of dropping incendiary bombs, then the second wave bombed on the fires started in the city, with many bombs falling in and around Devonport Dockyard. Although the S/Ls and AA LMGs were busy, they achieved few illuminations and the noise drowned the sound locators, while telephone communication to the GOR broke down. Further heavy raids over the next two nights repeated the destructive process on Devonport, including setting alight the oil storage tanks at Torpoint. On 28 April, a raid led to a large explosion at Bull Point Ordnance Depot, rendering 510 S/L Bty's HQ at Bull Point Barracks uninhabitable and it relocated to Sparkwell.

By the end of the Blitz in May 1941, 82nd S/L Rgt had been joined by two further batteries, 525 and 554 (although 525 S/L Bty was initially detached to 70th (Sussex) S/L Rgt in 5th AA Division and did not arrive until mid-March). 525 Searchlight Bty had been formed on 14 November by 232nd S/L Training Rgt at Devizes from a cadre provided by 68th S/L Rgt and was regimented by 11 February. 554 Searchlight Bty was formed on 13 February at 230th S/L Training Rgt at Blandford Camp from a cadre provided by 2nd S/L Rgt and was regimented by 5 May 1941. While 525 S/L Bty set up BHQ at Rockdale in Yealmpton, 554 Bty was accommodated in tents at the RA's New Practice Camp at Okehampton. By now, the regiment had a strength of 42 officers and 1,663 other ranks.

==== Mid-war ====
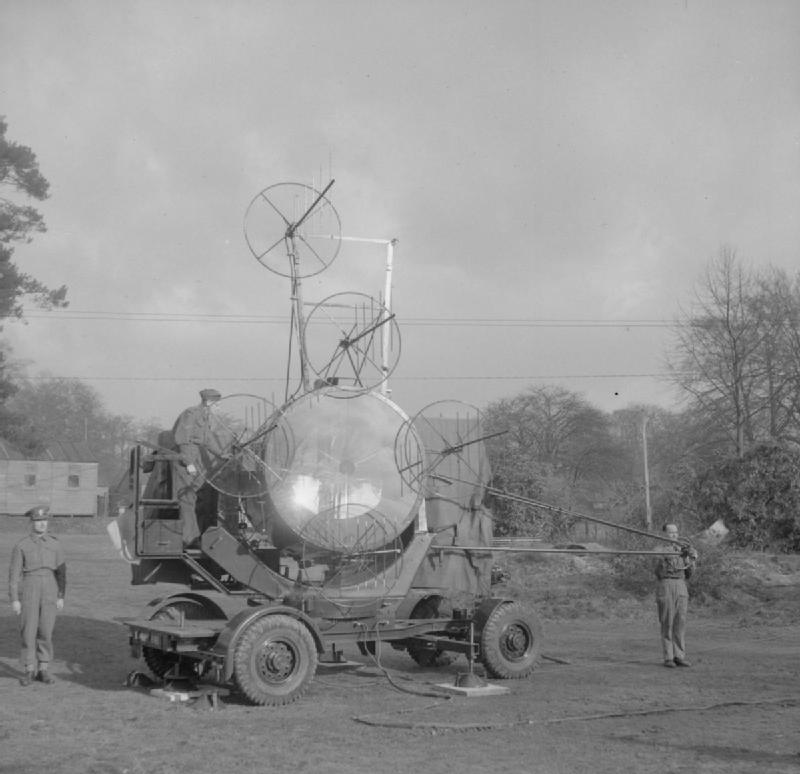
150 cm Searchlight with AA Radar No 2.

In June, 483 and 510 S/L Btys were relieved from their sites by Royal Marines and sent for training. On return in July and August, 483 S/L Bty deployed at single sites across Cornwall and 510 S/L Bty took over six anti-minelaying lights in the Falmouth area and 12 single lights around RAF Portreath and RAF Perranporth. With 554 S/L Bty now deployed the regiment had 54 lights in operation. RHQ moved to Pound House at Yelverton. A new system for S/L deployment came into operation in September 1941, with 'Indicator zones', 'Killer zones' (operating with night fighters) and 'Gun zones'. The indicator zones were to consist of lights equipped with Searchlight Control (SLC) radar at 10,400 yards (9,500 m) intervals. The regiment received its first SLC sets in October and began training on them.

Anti-Aircraft Command was suffering a manpower shortage and had begun to convert surplus S/L units to other roles such as light AA (LAA) guns. As part of the reorganisation into indicator and gun zones, 82nd S/L Rgt's batteries were relieved in November and ordered to join other regiments; 483 S/L Bty even had a farewell parade. However, the battery commanders voted to keep the regiment together if possible, and the orders were rescinded. Instead the regiment was re-assembled in Wiltshire and Berkshire under 64 AA Bde, with RHQ at Oare House in Oare and the batteries relieving those of 3rd S/L Rgt:

- 483 S/L Bty HQ at Market Lavington
- 510 S/L Bty HQ at Lydiard Millicent
- 525 S/L Bty HQ at Faringdon
- 554 S/L Bty HQ at Kintbury

For the first time, the regiment had its full establishment of 96 S/Ls in operation. With the Luftwaffe inactive, much of the nightly work involved using S/Ls as homing beacons for airfields such as RAF Andover, RAF Boscombe Down and RAF Colerne. On 24 February, Lt-Col Crouch moved to command 42nd (Robin Hoods) S/L Rgt; he was succeeded by Lt-Col W.N. Ashburner, TD.

This situation continued for the next 18 months, towards the end of which the regiment was issued with Bofors 40mm LAA guns in addition to its S/Ls, receiving 25 guns by June 1943.

==== Later War ====
On 4 June 1943, RHQ moved from Oare to RAF Coltishall in Norfolk under 41 AA Bde and the batteries relieved those of 69th (3rd City of London) S/L Rgt. The regiment continued to train with Bofors guns, and also with 0.50" Browning twin machine guns and 20 mm Hispano cannon to counter the Luftwaffe 's daylight hit-and-run attacks against East Coast towns. The regiment maintained 'Y Force' of five Troops to protect Great Yarmouth. By October, its night commitments had expanded to 91 S/Ls in the normal AA role, plus 10 'Canopy' lights over Yarmouth and 6 more over Coltishall. There were occasional night incursions over Eastern England during the winter by Luftwaffe aircraft, some of which were engaged by Browning fire.

By early 1944, AA Command was being forced to make manpower cuts, releasing men to 21st Army Group for Operation Overlord, the planned Allied invasion of Normandy. A number of S/L btys had to be disbanded, including 554 Bty of 82nd S/L Rgt. First a troop from the battery was transferred to 466 S/L Bty of 72nd S/L Rgt on 1 January 1944, then the remainder of 554 S/L Bty began disbanding on 25 February, completing by 24 March. After this, the regiment's strength was 37 officers, about 1,245 other ranks, 87 women of the Auxiliary Territorial Service and 78 members of the Army Catering Corps (ACC). RHQ was at 'Orchards' in Raveningham. Lieutenant-Col K.J. Pearce took over as CO during the summer.

Shortly after D Day, the Luftwaffe began launching V-1 flying bombs against Southern England. AA Command and RAF Fighter Command countered with Operation Diver. The first phase of these attacks ended in September 1944 after 21st Army Group overran the launching sites in Northern France. AA Command then began planning to counter the expected attacks by air-launched V-1s coming in across the East Coast. 41 AA Brigade was tasked with reconnoitring and establishing new heavy AA gunsites for this 'Diver Fringe' belt of defences. The guns were emplaced on temporary 'Pile platforms' named after the Commander-in-Chief of AA Command, Gen Sir Frederick 'Tim' Pile. On 22 September, 82nd S/L Rgt was ordered to provide a large working party to unload and erect these platforms within three days and to erect huts for the gun crews. The regiment closed down RHQ at Raveningham and moved to the Royal Hotel at Yarmouth to oversee this work.

==== Disbandment ====
The War Office had warned in June 1944 that AA Command would have to release further manpower to provide reinforcements to 21st Army Group fighting in North West Europe. The run-down began in September 1944; on 1 October, it was announced that 82nd S/L Rgt was to be disbanded by 21 October (as an established TA unit, 483 S/L Bty would lapse into 'suspended animation' rather than be disbanded). However, although the regimental strength began to fall as men were posted away, work on the Diver sites continued and the regiment had still not disbanded at the end of the year. On 1 January, it was ordered to Hatfield Militia Camp near Doncaster under the command of 32 AA Bde. It joined 72nd (Middlesex) and 80th S/L Rgts; all three were reduced to battery strength and consolidated under the command of RHQ 72nd S/L Rgt. The other ranks of the 82nd became 466 S/L Bty of 72nd S/L Rgt, while the officers and ACC staff continued as RHQ 82nd S/L Rgt under the command of Maj W.H. Rylands of 525 Bty. This diminished HQ was then sent to Southampton where it became a holding unit for surplus (older or unfit) men from S/L regiments that were being converted into RA infantry regiments. During February, the regiment consisted of 30 officers, 63 (later over 200) ACC cooks, and almost 2000 other ranks. The regiment's batteries were revived to command these men and women:

- HQ at 'Greyladyes', Bursledon, Southampton (previously RHQ location of 48th S/L Rgt)
- 483 Bty: personnel of 639 (Essex Regiment) Infantry Rgt (previously 64th S/L Rgt)
- 510 Bty: personnel of 630 (Essex) Infantry Rgt (previously 28th S/L Rgt)
- 525 Bty: (probably) personnel of
  - 636 (Hampshire) Infantry Rgt (previously 48th S/L Rgt),
  - 637 (Northamptonshire Regiment) Infantry Rgt (previously 50th S/L Rgt)
  - 638 (Royal Northumberland Fusiliers) Infantry Rgt (previously 53rd S/L Rgt)

After disposing of large amounts of S/L equipment, 82nd Searchlight Regiment was finally disbanded after March 1945; 525 Bty completed the process by 12 May, but 483 S/L Bty did not complete its dispersal until 12 August 1945.

== Postwar ==
When the TA was reconstituted in 1947, it was proposed to reform the Dorset Fortress Engineers as 857 Tractor Battery, RA (Dorset Fortress) to drive gun tractors, but it was never formed.

== Honorary Colonel ==
The following officer served as Honorary Colonel of the unit:

- Lt-Col Sir Edward Le Breton (a member of the Gentlemen at Arms) appointed 3 June 1936

== Memorials ==
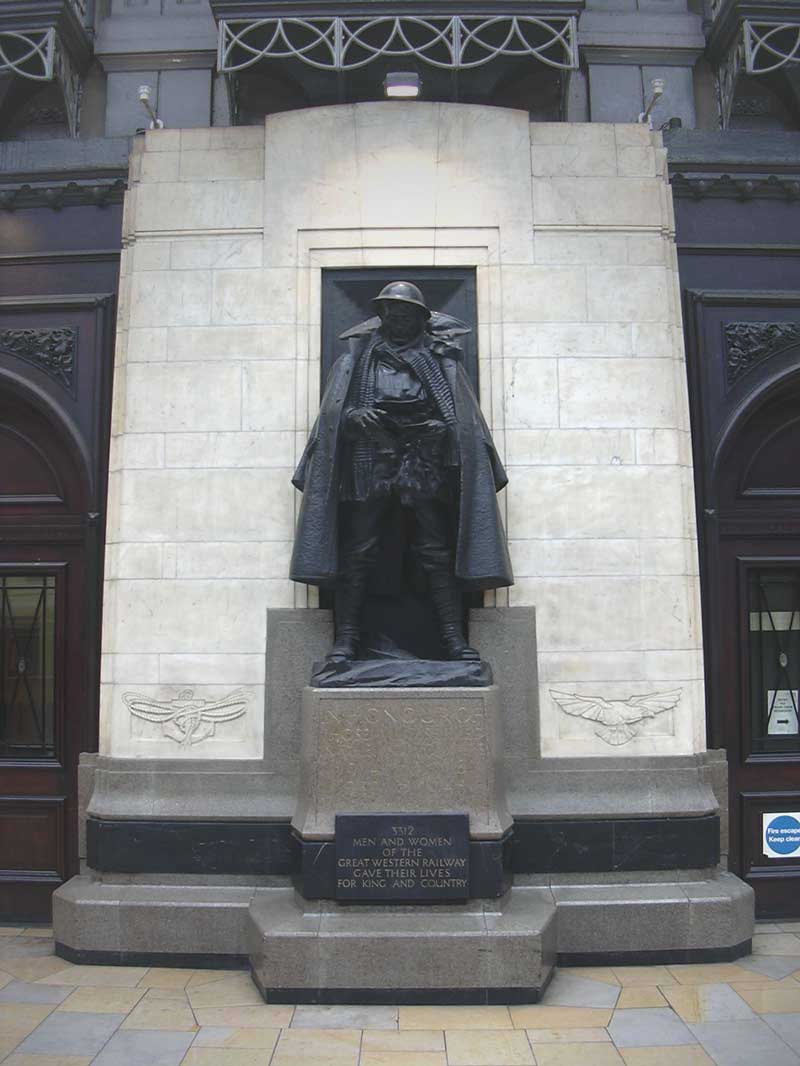
GWR War Memorial on Platform 1 at Paddington.

The men of the Great Western Railway who died on service (including those with 565th (Wiltshire) Company, RE) are commemorated by the Great Western Railway War Memorial at Paddington Station, and at individual railway locations, such as the Swindon Locomotive Shed.

== Insignia ==
82nd Searchlight Regiment awarded a special orange lanyard as a regimental mark of distinction, for example to Lance-Serjeant W.J. Marriott and Gunner F.H.S. Warner who on 21 February 1944 risked their lives in a fruitless attempt to rescue the crews of two Flying Fortresses that had collided and crashed in flames near their post.
