= 72nd (Middlesex) Searchlight Regiment, Royal Artillery =

72nd (Middlesex) Searchlight Regiment, RA 607th (Middlesex) LAA/Searchlight Regiment, RA
- Cap Badge of the Royal Artillery (pre-1953)
- Active: 1 November 1938–10 March 1955
- Country: United Kingdom
- Branch: Territorial Army
- Type: Searchlight Regiment
- Role: Air Defence
- Size: Regiment
- Garrison/HQ: Heston; Twickenham
- Engagements: Battle of Britain; The Blitz

72nd (Middlesex) Searchlight Regiment, Royal Artillery was an air defence unit of Britain's Territorial Army (TA) raised just before the outbreak of World War II, which served as part of Anti-Aircraft Command during and after the war.

== Origin ==
As the international situation deteriorated in the late 1930s, the threat of air raids on the UK led to the rapid expansion in numbers of anti-aircraft (AA) units manned by members of the part-time TA. Formed on 1 November 1938, 72nd (Middlesex) was the third of a new group of three TA searchlight regiments raised by the Royal Artillery (previous TA S/L units had all been part of the Royal Engineers and/or converted from infantry battalions). It consisted of HQ and Nos 465–467 Companies (later Batteries) based at a newly built drill hall at Vicarage Road, Heston. Shortly afterwards, the regiment moved to Twickenham. It was equipped with the new '90 cm Projector Anti Aircraft', a smaller and lighter piece of equipment than previous searchlights, with a more powerful high current density arc lamp with automatic carbon feed.

== World War II ==
90 cm Projector Anti-Aircraft, displayed at Fort Nelson, Portsmouth

Anti-Aircraft Command mobilised in August 1939, ahead of the declaration of war on 3 September, and the regiment took its place in 47th AA Brigade, part of 5th AA Division tasked with defending Southampton.

Southampton was a regular target for raids by the German Luftwaffe during the Battle of Britain in the summer of 1940, but by November 1940 the regiment had transferred to 40 AA Bde in 2nd AA Division in the Midlands. It had the responsibility for covering RAF airfields in the East Midlands and continued in that role throughout the Blitz of 1940–41.

In the autumn of 1940 72nd S/L Rgt was joined by a newly-formed 501 S/L Bty. The regiment supplied a cadre of experienced officers and men to 237th S/L Training Rgt at Holywood, County Down, where it provided the basis for a new 560 S/L Bty formed on 13 February 1941. This battery later joined 90th S/L Rgt.

In late 1941 the regiment transferred within 2nd AA Division to 41 (London)AA Bde covering East Anglia. It remained for several years with this brigade, which by the summer of 1943 consisted only of 72nd and 82nd S/L Rgts.

On 1 January 1944, 466 S/L Bty was joined by a troop of 554 S/L Bty from 82nd S/L Rgt. However, as the threat of attack by the weakened Luftwaffe waned, AA Command was being forced to release manpower for the planned invasion of Normandy (Operation Overlord). All Home Defence searchlight regiments were reduced from February 1944, and 72nd S/L Rgt lost 501 S/L Bty, which completed disbandment on 24 March. Then the War Office warned in June that AA Command would have to release manpower to provide reinforcements to 21st Army Group fighting in North West Europe. The run-down began in September 1944, and the regiment and its three batteries were at Reepham, Norfolk, when they were ordered to begin entering 'suspended animation' on 25 September, with their personnel being posted away.

In fact, on 1 January 1945, the regiment was at Hatfield Militia Camp near Doncaster under the command of 32 AA Bde, where it was joined by 80th and 82nd S/L Rgts. All three were reduced to battery strength and consolidated under the command of RHQ 72nd S/L Rgt. The other ranks of 82nd became 466 S/L Bty of 72nd S/L Rgt, while the officers and staff continued as RHQ 82nd S/L Rgt, which became a holding unit at Southampton for surplus (older or unfit) men from S/L regiments that were being converted into RA infantry regiments. The dispersals continued as the war ended: 465 and 466 S/L Btys entered suspended animation on 3 April, RHQ 72nd S/L Rgt on 11 June, and 467 S/L Bty on 26 June.

== Postwar ==
When the TA was reconstituted on 1 January 1947, 72nd S/L Rgt was reformed at Twickenham as 607 Searchlight Regiment, RA (Middlesex), forming part of 67 AA Bde (the former 41 AA Bde based at Shepherd's Bush). In 1949, the regiment's role was altered and it was redesignated 607th (Mixed) Light Anti-Aircraft/Searchlight Regiment, RA (Middlesex) ('Mixed' denoting that members of the Women's Royal Army Corps were integrated into the unit).

AA Command was abolished on 10 March 1955, and 607 LAA/SL Regiment was disbanded at the same time, completing the process by 30 June.

== External sources ==
- Keith Brigstock 'Royal Artillery Searchlights', presentation to Royal Artillery Historical Society at Larkhill, 17 January 2007.
- British Military History
- British Army units from 1945 on
- Orders of Battle at Patriot Files
- Royal Artillery 1939–1945
- Graham Watson, The Territorial Army 1947
