= 120th Heavy Anti-Aircraft Regiment, Royal Artillery =

120th Heavy Anti-Aircraft Regiment, RA
- Cap Badge of the Royal Artillery
- Active: 23 January 1941–25 June 1944
- Country: United Kingdom
- Branch: British Army
- Type: Heavy Anti-Aircraft Regiment
- Role: Air Defence
- Size: 3–4 Batteries
- Part of: 9 AA Division; 1 AA Division; Ninth Army
- Engagements: The Blitz; Defence of London; Defence of Cyprus

120th Heavy Anti-Aircraft Regiment, Royal Artillery (120th HAA Rgt) was an air defence unit of the British Army during World War II. Raised in early 1941, it served to protect South Wales and London before proceeding overseas in 1943. It provided anti-aircraft (AA) cover over Cyprus until its disbandment in 1944.

== South Wales ==
Formation sign of 9 AA Division

The regiment was formed in South Wales at the height of The Blitz in January and February 1941. Regimental Headquarters (RHQ) was formed at Lawrenny Castle, in Pembrokeshire, on 23 January 1941, and three newly-raised batteries joined on 8 February:

- 381 HAA Bty, formed on 14 November 1940 at 205th HAA Training Regiment at Arborfield from a cadre provided by 56th (Cornwall) HAA Regiment
- 384 HAA Bty, formed on 14 November 1940 at 206th HAA Training Regiment at Arborfield from a cadre provided by 87th HAA Regiment (a unit from County Durham)
- 386 HAA Bty, formed on 14 November 1940 at 207th HAA Training Regiment at Devizes from a cadre provided by 76th (Gloucestershire) HAA Regiment

The regiment came under the command of 61 AA Brigade in 9 AA Division, and at the beginning of March 384 HAA Bty relieved 174 HAA Bty of 85th (Tees) HAA Rgt at gunsites O1 (defending Royal Ordnance Factory Pembrey) and P9 (West Pennar defending the oil terminal at Pembroke Dock). These were equipped with four 3-inch and four 3.7-inch guns respectively and were under the operational command of 79th (Hertfordshire Yeomanry) HAA Rgt.

However, the batteries were soon moved eastwards to bolster the Gun Defence Area (GDA) around Swansea, which had been badly hit by Luftwaffe raids on three successive nights in February (the Swansea Blitz). Half of 384 HAA Bty took over site O2 at Llanelli with four 3-inch guns on 19 March, and on 24 March the detachments at Pembrey were ordered to take their guns and set up a new temporary site designated N12, approximately one mile west of Jersey Marine. Next the detachments at Llanelli moved their guns to N9, north-east of Port Talbot and reported ready for action on 5 April. On 18 April 386 HAA Bty also came under the operational command of 79th (HY) HAA Rgt. By the end of April, 120th HAA Rgt was responsible for the following positions under 79th (HY) HAA Rgt in the Swansea GDA:

- N3A, Jersey Marine – 2 Sections 386 HAA Bty (4 x 3-inch)
- N7, Briton Ferry – 384 HAA Bty (2 x 3.7-inch, 2 x 3-inch)
- N9, Port Talbot – 384 HAA Bty (4 x 3-inch)

By now, the Blitz was nearing its end. All the enemy activity in April consisted of raids passing over South Wales on their way to attack targets elsewhere, with the guns being engaged on the nights of 3/4, 7/8 and 15/16 April, the latter night being a long engagement giving the gunners good practice in firing at 'unseen' targets under control of GL Mk. I radar while the bombers crossed the area northwards and then returned southwards. Engagements the following month were also sporadic, with the guns firing on 4/5, 7/8 and 11/12 May (regarded as the last night of the Blitz).

Between June and August the batteries handed over their responsibilities to 79th (HY) HAA Rgt and returned to the command of 120th HAA Rgt, which was ordered to leave South Wales and join 26 (London) AA Bde in 1 AA Division defending London. On 21 August the regiment was joined by the experienced 248 (Welwyn) HAA Bty transferred from 79th (HY) HAA Rgt. The Welwyn Battery was a prewar Territorial Army unit that had seen heavy action during the Battle of France in 1940 and the Swansea Blitz in February 1941.

== London ==
Formation sign of 1 AA Division

In London the regiment and its four batteries (248, 381, 384, 386) took over gunsites in the northern part of the London Inner Artillery Zone (IAZ). For example, on 21 August 248 (Welwyn) HAA Bty took over two static four-gun 3.7-inch sites:

- ZW2 – Edmonton
- ZE10 – Highams

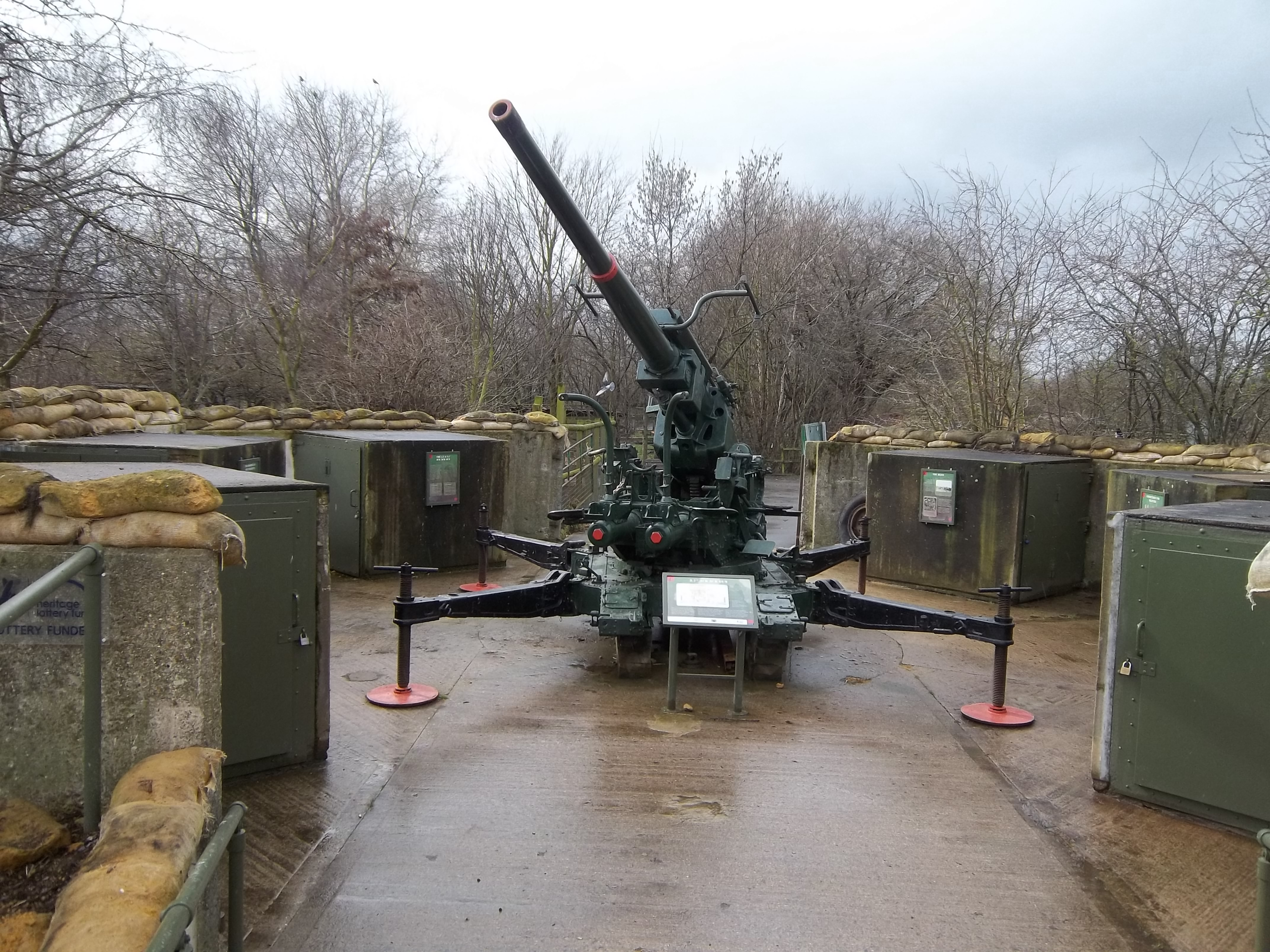
3.7-inch gun at preserved gunsite at Mudchute on the Isle of Dogs,

Routine moves over the following months saw 248 Bty occupying the following sites at various times:

- ZW5 – Hyde Park
- ZW8 – Hurlingham
- ZE22 – Hampstead
- ZE5 – Clayhall
- ZW13 – Mill Hill
- ZE21 – Hackney (4 x 4.5-inch guns)
- ZE8 – Isle of Dogs (4 x 4.5-inch)

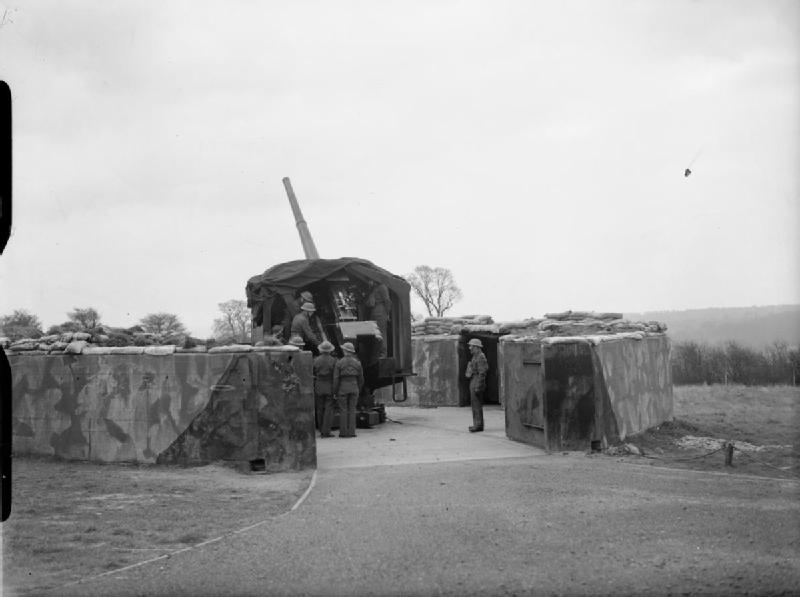
4.5-inch gunsite of the type manned by 120th HAA Rgt.

120th HAA Regiment remained in and around London for over a year, serving through the desultory Luftwaffe raids of 1942.

In October 1942, 386 HAA Bty left the regiment and joined a new 175th HAA Rgt that was being formed. 386 HAA Battery later served with 175th HAA Rgt in defence of Gibraltar. Then in mid-January 1943, 120th HAA Rgt moved out of 26 AA Bde's area and came under direct War Office control to mobilise for overseas service as a defended ports unit on a three-battery establishment (248, 381, 384 Btys).

== Cyprus ==
After two months at the mobilisation centre at Easthampstead in Berkshire the regiment sailed from Liverpool on 14 March and disembarked at Port Tewfik in Egypt on 6 May. Here it came under the command of Middle East Forces. After a month in Egypt it was moved by railway to Beirut and then by sea to Cyprus, where it landed on 14 June to take over AA defence of ports and airfields on the island under 20 AA Bde in Ninth Army.

248 (Welwyn) Battery was initially deployed as follows:

- A Troop: Larnaca (4 x mobile 3.7-inch)
- B Troop: Nicosia (4 x mobile 3.7-inch)

At the end of June 1943 the regiment was changed to a semi-mobile establishment. In early July, A Trp of 248 Bty moved to Famagusta and then to Limassol in mid-August, while B Trp moved to Paphos in mid-August. In addition, detachments from 248 battery manned guns on the island of Castelrosso, at that time the only island of the Dodecanese in Allied hands.

At the end of October 1943, the regiment was 'diluted' (as the process was officially described) by a draft of Basuto troops from the African Pioneer Corps to be trained as gunners, releasing a similar number of British Other Ranks for duties elsewhere. The state of readiness in Cyprus was relaxed in March 1944 and the AA defences on the island were run down during April. The remaining personnel moved to Cairo where 120th HAA Rgt was disbanded on 25 June 1944.
