= 79th (Hertfordshire Yeomanry) Heavy Anti-Aircraft Regiment, Royal Artillery =

79th (Hertfordshire Yeomanry) Heavy Anti-Aircraft Regiment, RA 479 (Hertfordshire Yeomanry) Heavy Anti-Aircraft Regiment, RA
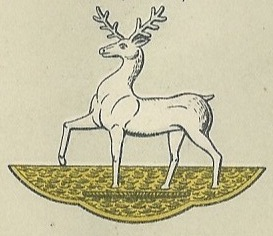
- Active: 1 November 1938 – 10 March 1955
- Country: United Kingdom
- Branch: Territorial Army
- Type: Heavy Anti-Aircraft Regiment
- Role: Air Defence
- Size: 3-4 Batteries
- Part of: 6th Anti-Aircraft Division; British Expeditionary Force; 9th Anti-Aircraft Division; First Army; Allied Forces Headquarters; US Fifth Army; Eighth Army; 63 (North London) AA Bde
- Garrison/HQ: Watford; Barnet (post 1947)
- Engagements: Battle of France; Swansea Blitz; Operation Torch; Italian Campaign

The 79th (Hertfordshire Yeomanry) Heavy Anti-Aircraft Regiment, Royal Artillery (79th (HY) HAA Rgt) was an air defence unit of Britain's Territorial Army (TA). Formed just before World War II, it fought in the Battle of France, the Swansea Blitz, Operation Torch and the Italian Campaign. It continued serving in the post-war TA until 1955.

== Origin ==
During the period of international tension in 1938, the TA was rapidly expanded in size, particularly for the Anti-Aircraft (AA) role. Much of this expansion was achieved by converting and/or expanding existing units. In the case of 86th (East Anglian) (Herts Yeomanry) Field Brigade, Royal Artillery, partly descended from the old Hertfordshire Yeomanry cavalry, this was done by expanding 343 (Watford) Field Battery into a complete new AA brigade. Orders were issued by the Army Council in July 1938 and the new unit came into existence on 1 November with the following organisation (the traditional term 'brigade' for a Lieutenant-Colonel's command in the Royal Artillery (RA) being superseded by 'regiment' on 1 January 1939, and the 'Hertfordshire Yeomanry' subtitle being granted in July 1939):

79th (Hertfordshire Yeomanry) Anti-Aircraft Regiment, RA

- Regimental HQ (RHQ) at Clarendon Hall, Watford
- 246 (1st Watford) Anti-Aircraft Battery – 2 x QF 3-inch 20 cwt semi-mobile guns
- 247 (2nd Watford) Anti-Aircraft Battery – 2 x 3-inch semi-mobile guns
- 248 (Welwyn) Anti-Aircraft Battery at Lemsford Lane, Welwyn Garden City – due to receive QF 3.7-inch AA guns

2nd Hertfordshire Company of the Bedfordshire and Hertfordshire Unit, Auxiliary Territorial Service (ATS), was also based at Watford and affiliated to 79th (HY) AA Rgt. Under the command of Jean Knox (later director of the ATS) it provided support staff in the early days.

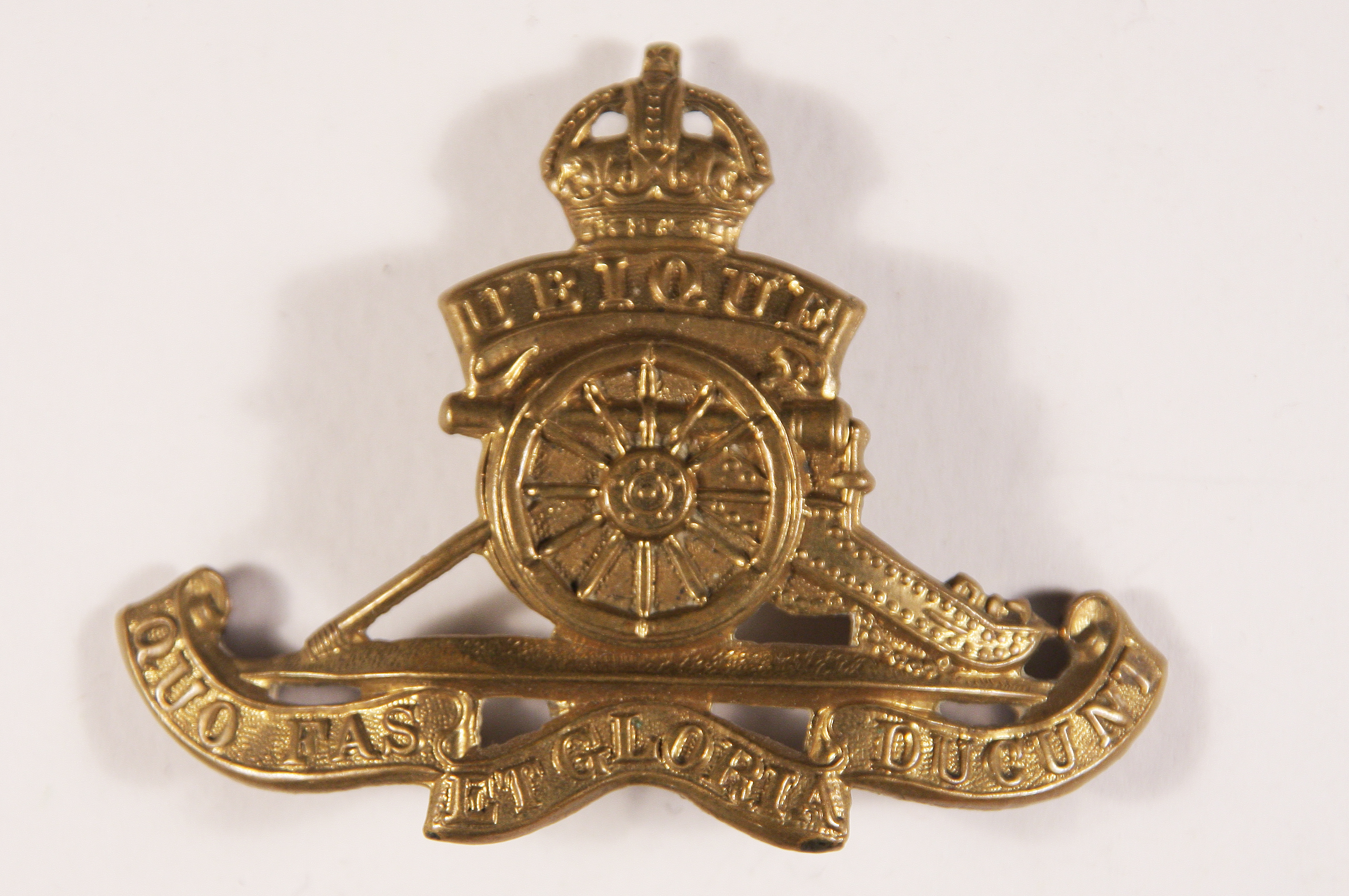
RA cap badge

86th Field Brigade had retained the Hertfordshire Yeomanry badge of the Hart (deer) as a collar badge worn in addition to the RA's 'gun' cap badge, and later it replaced the gun badge on side caps and berets; this was continued by the new unit even though 343 Field Bty was strictly descended from 4th East Anglian Brigade, Royal Field Artillery, and not the Yeomanry.

Major Thomas Bazley Green, TD, officer commanding (OC) 341 (St Albans) Field Bty, was promoted to Lt-Col to raise and command the new regiment. Other officers were drawn from 86th Field Rgt and other TA units including Stockbrokers serving in the ranks of the 54th (City of London) AA Rgt.

== Mobilisation ==
In June 1939, as the international situation worsened, a partial mobilisation of Anti-Aircraft Command was begun in a process known as 'couverture', whereby each TA AA unit did a month's tour of duty in rotation to man selected gun positions. 79th (HY) AA Regiment was embodied on 25 June for a partial deployment to gunsites along the south bank of the Thames Estuary, with RHQ at Fort Borstal. The availability of equipment at the gunsites was invaluable for training the recruits, and the second half of the month's embodiment was spent at the AA Practice Camp at Bude in Cornwall.

On 24 August, ahead of the declaration of war, AA Command was fully mobilised and sent to its war stations. 79th (HY) AA Rgt was under the command of 37th AA Brigade in 6th Anti-Aircraft Division, responsible for the defences of South East England, centred on the Thames Estuary and including the airfields of 11 Group of RAF Fighter Command.

The regiment's immediate task was to deploy two sections to defend Fighter Command's HQ at Bentley Priory near Stanmore in Middlesex. This required all four of the regiment's 3-inch guns, which were manned by 247 Bty. 247 Battery then drew four more 3-inch guns from the School of Anti-Aircraft Defence at RAF Biggin Hill and deployed them to defend RAF Duxford. Meanwhile 246 Bty took over four 3-inch guns from 90th AA Rgt at Alexandra Palace and four more from 59th (Essex Regiment) AA Rgt at Walthamstow and deployed them to RAF Debden and RAF North Weald respectively. One section of 248 Bty manned two 3-inch guns at Biggin Hill while the rest of the battery manned Lewis Light machine guns (LMGs) at RAF Felixstowe (8 LMGs) and RAF Martlesham Heath (12 LMGs).

== Second World War ==
=== Phoney War ===
After war was declared on 3 September there were numerous adjustments to AA Command's deployment as further units and equipment became available. During the autumn 79th (HY) AA Rgt handed over most of its responsibilities for airfields, and shifted towards the Gun Defence Area (GDA) round the port of Harwich and adjacent harbours, where Lt-Col Bazley-Green was appointed AA Defence Commander (AADC) with a Gun Operations Room (GOR) at Harwich:

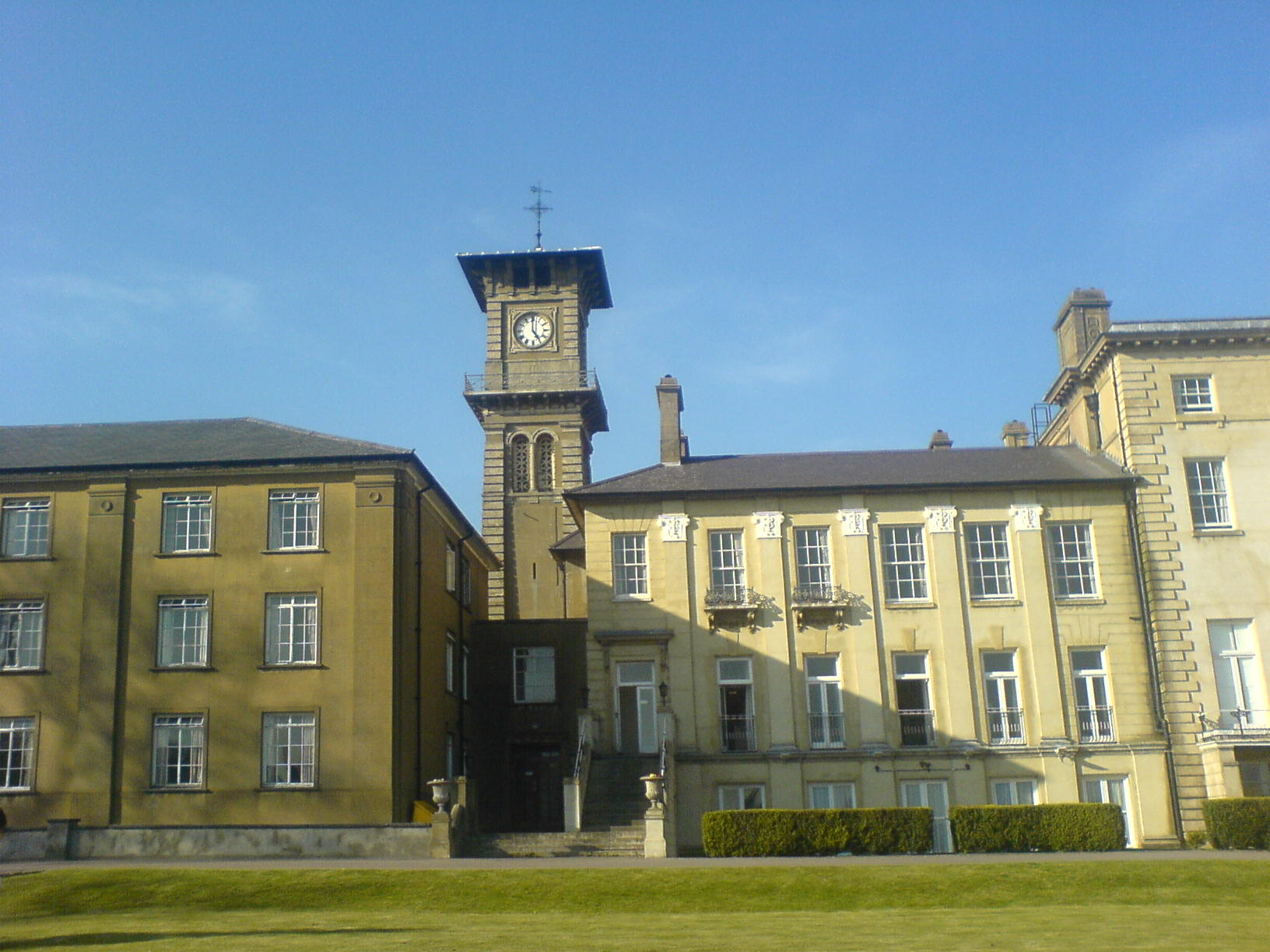
RAF Bentley Priory, protected by 79th (HY) AA Rgt in the early days of the Second World War

- RHQ at Stansted Mountfitchet, later Felixstowe
- 246 Bty:
  - 4 x 3-inch at site H1 (Landguard Common, Felixstowe)
  - 20 x AA LMG at Royal Naval Mining Depot, Wrabness
  - 20 x AA LMG at Murex Works, Rainham
- 247 Bty:
  - 2 x 3-inch at site A1 (RAF Bentley Priory)
  - 2 x 3-inch at site A2 (RAF Bentley Priory)
  - 2 x 3-inch at site H5 (Beacon Hill Battery, Harwich)
- 248 Bty:
  - 2 x 3.7-inch at site H2 (Trimley, Felixstowe)
  - 2 x 3.7-inch at site H3 (Dovercourt)
  - 20 x AA LMG at RAF Martlesham Heath
  - 20 x AA LMG at Parkeston Quay, Harwich

(The Royal Navy submarine depot ship HMS Cyclops in Harwich harbour was designated as AA site H4 under the GOR)

On 17 October the regiment fired its first rounds in anger, when sites H2 and H3 engaged an aircraft identified as hostile. During this period a draft of 100-plus recruits (Militiamen with 3 months' AA training) was received for each battery, and training began for 'Operators, Fire Control' who would man RDF (radar) sets when they arrived.

On 26 December a warning order was received to prepare to move overseas, and the detachments concentrated at Harwich. The regiment was designated as a base defence AA regiment to man static 3.7-inch guns. 248 Battery was already experienced with the 3.7-inch and only needed to attend short courses by sections on a static gun site at Dartford before mobilising at Blackdown Camp near Aldershot, whereas 246 and 247 Btys went to 208th AA Training Rgt at Yeovil and 209th AA Training Rgt at Blandford respectively, followed by two weeks at No 4 AA Practice Camp at Tŷ Croes on Anglesey and No 1 AA Practice Camp at Aberporth in West Wales respectively.

=== France ===
248 Bty proceeded from Blackdown to Southampton and sailed for France on the night of 7/8 February 1940. It landed at Le Havre where it came under the operational command of 8th (Belfast) AA Rgt in 3 AA Bde guarding the lines of communication for the British Expeditionary Force (BEF). It was to remain at Le Havre to man two static 3.7-inch gun positions at Parc de la Hève on the edge of the cliff in front of the lighthouse. The concrete pits were built and guns emplaced by 27 February. The rest of the regiment disembarked on 6 March under the command of Lt-Col R.C. Raikes and took over from 8th AA Rgt. 246 Battery manned four static guns on the harbour mole and four mobile guns some 300 yards to the west. 247 Bty manned one 4-gun position on the seafront and another at Octeville-sur-Mer. In addition, 4 Light AA (LAA) Bty was attached, manning eight static and four mobile Bofors 40 mm guns sited round Le Havre. Both 246 Bty at the harbour and 247 Bty at Octeville were equipped with a Gun-Laying (GL) Radar Mk I set, and in the absence of searchlights the commanders of 3 AA Bde and 79th (HY) AA Rgt devised an AA barrage scheme using fixed bearings and staggered heights over the docks and oil storage tanks for 'unseen' fire at night; this was codenamed 'Pillar of Fire'.

The Battle of France began on 10 May with the German invasion of the Low Countries and France. The BEF followed the pre-arranged Plan D and advanced into Belgium, but a rapid German breakthrough in the Ardennes forced it to fall back again. By 21 May the main body of the BEF was cut off, and between 26 May and 4 June as much as possible was evacuated through Dunkirk (Operation Dynamo).

Even after the Dunkirk evacuation ended, there were still British forces in France north of the Seine, and 79th (HY) AA Rgt maintained its defences at Le Havre covering the Seine ferries. As AADC, Lt-Col Raikes had a troop of 174 LAA Bty from 58th (Argyll and Sutherland Highlanders) LAA Rgt and from 20 May a battery of 37th (Tyne Electrical Engineers) Searchlight Rgt with 24 lights, in addition to his own regiment and 4 LAA Bty. There were also some Barrage balloons and French AA guns.

From 10 to 19 May the only Luftwaffe activity in the area was daily reconnaissance flights, but on the night of 19/20 May there was a three-hour raid on the French airfield at Octeville, during which 'Pillar of fire' brought down an enemy aircraft, followed on succeeding nights by attempts to drop Parachute mines into the harbour entrance. Nightly air attacks on the harbour area began in earnest on 3/4 June, with the guns in action for long periods.

By 8 June, under renewed German attacks, the 1st Armoured and the 51st (Highland) Infantry Division and other assorted British forces withdrew to the Seine. That night, with much of the town and oil depots set on fire by the raids, 'Cuckoo Section' of 79th (HY) AA Rgt ferried the four highly secret GL radar transmitter trailers and their receiver trailers across the river to Honfleur, followed by 247 Bty with the mobile guns.

With the enemy closing on Le Havre, the 51st (Highland) Infantry Division was cut off and forced to surrender, 3 AA Bde was ordered to evacuate. On the night of 11/12 June 246 Bty disabled their static guns and boarded the Southern Railway ferry SS Brittany, which took them to Cherbourg-en-Cotentin. RHQ and most of 248 Bty followed the next night aboard SS St Briac. In a week of prolonged action, 15 enemy aircraft had been destroyed and many of the dive-bombing attacks by Junkers Ju 87 Stukas disrupted.

Operation Aerial, to evacuate the remainder of the British forces from France was now under way. From Cherbourg, RHQ and the two batteries without equipment were shunted by train between Nantes and Rennes before being evacuated from St Nazaire aboard SS Duchess of York and reaching Liverpool on 18 June. The party of 248 Bty that had stayed to disable the guns was evacuated through St Malo. 247 Battery, operating directly under 3 AA Bde, deployed to defend Rennes and then moved to St Nazaire on 18 June, when it dumped its disabled guns in the dock and boarded SS Glenaffric and was evacuated to Plymouth.

Cuckoo Section joined 3 AA Bde HQ at Martigné on 9 June and moved to Nantes on 11 June. On 14 June it was joined by two transmitters and receivers from 73rd HAA Rgt and on 16 June by two more transmitters. With great difficulty, the section got all the secret equipment aboard the SS Marslew which sailed on 18 June and docked at Falmouth, Cornwall, the following day.

=== Home Defence ===
While the bulk of the regiment was accommodated in guest houses in Blackpool, 247 Bty went from Plymouth to a hutted camp at Devizes, and then to No 1 AA Practice Camp at Aberporth. When 79th (HY) Heavy AA Rgt (as AA units were designated from 1 June 1940 to distinguish them from LAA) was ordered to join 45 AA Bde in South Wales as part of 5th Anti-Aircraft Division, 247 Bty immediately went to occupy a gunsite at Jersey Marine, near Swansea on 30 July. The rest of the regiment then attended Aberporth before relieving batteries of 77th (Welsh) HAA Rgt at Cardiff to allow them to attend Aberporth in turn. Two sections of 248 Bty spent over a month at Cardiff, with the guns in action against almost daily air raids during the Battle of Britain.

246 Battery emplaced eight 3.7-inch guns at Pembroke Dock to defend the oil terminal. The guns were unloaded on 24 August and were in action against an air raid the following day. There was a heavy raid on Swansea from 20.55 to 03.00 on the night of 1/2 September, but because RAF night fighters were in the area, 247 Bty was prevented from firing for the first three hours. After that raid, Lt-Col Raikes of 79th (HY) Rgt devised a new barrage scheme for the Swansea GDA codenamed 'Ball of Fire'. By the end of the month the responsibilities at Pembroke Dock and Cardiff had been handed over to other units and the whole of the regiment was deployed around Swansea, with a GOR established.

9th Anti-Aircraft Division formation badge, worn on the upper arm by all ranks of the regiment.

On 15 September the regiment provided the first of five cadres sent to form the basis of new batteries forming at the training regiments (see below). In this case 364 HAA Bty was regimented with 79th (HY) until it completed its training and joined 116th HAA Rgt in December. The regiment also undertook basic training for an intake of 250 local Welsh recruits, of whom 100 remained with the regiment while others were posted to 77th Searchlight Rgt in 45 AA Bde. In January 1941 the regiment received a draft of 120 older recruits for basic training before they were sent to Z Battery rocket units.

In November 1940, 45 AA Bde was split into two, with a new 61 AA Bde HQ (Note: Several sources mistakenly label 61 AA Bde as 64 AA Bde; the correct designation is confirmed by the regimental history and official AA Command Order of Battle.) taking over control of Swansea and South West Wales as far as Milford Haven; it came under a new 9th Anti-Aircraft Division split off from the 5th Anti-Aircraft Division.

During October, 248 Bty began constructing a new gunsite at Mumbles, which broke away from convention by positioning the emplacements at the corners of a field, concealed in the hedges and served by the existing road, rather than grouped in the centre of the field with visible access tracks. The position was completed and guns mounted in December, and a similar 4-gun site was begun in January at Ravenhill north of Swansea. The new elevation-finding attachment ('Effie') for the GL Mark I radar was also installed.

=== Swansea Blitz ===
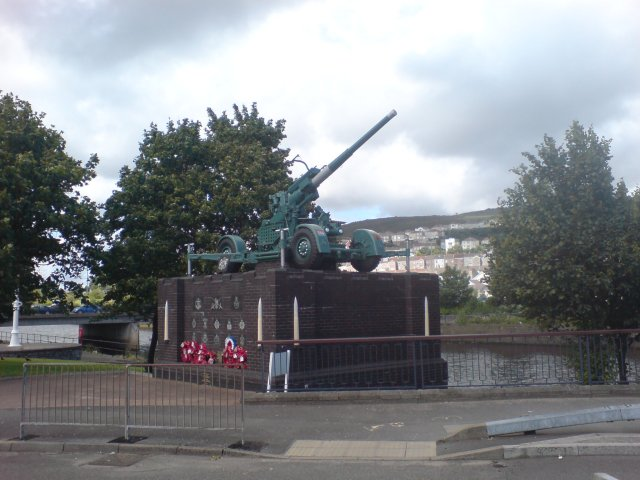
A mobile 3.7-inch gun surmounts the monument erected to the air defence of Swansea, particularly the night of 21 February 1941.

There was enemy air activity over the Bristol Channel and South Wales coast on most nights, but usually these were reconnaissances or nuisance raids, Heavier raids against Swansea began on 4/5 January 1941, when a bomb put all the GOR telephone lines out of action, but the gunsites continued with 'Ball of Fire' barrages.

In February 1941 the Luftwaffe began a new tactic of hitting the same towns on successive nights in an attempt to put them completely out of action. Swansea was the first town so attacked. On the night of 19/20 February the building housing both RHQ and the GOR was destroyed by a direct hit during a heavy raid. Two officers and five other ranks (ORs) were killed or died of wounds, but the guns continued firing under local control and communications were maintained.

The Luftwaffe returned to continue the 'Swansea Blitz' on the nights of 20/21 and 21/22 February. On the latter night there was confusion between the Sector Operations Room at RAF Pembrey and the Swansea GOR, resulting in the guns ceasing fire between 20.20 and 21.10, leaving the town centre unprotected. Although some raiders were shot down once the restriction was lifted, the centre of Swansea was devastated, and fires and delayed-action bombs destroyed communications. The GOR had to be temporarily relocated to Neath.

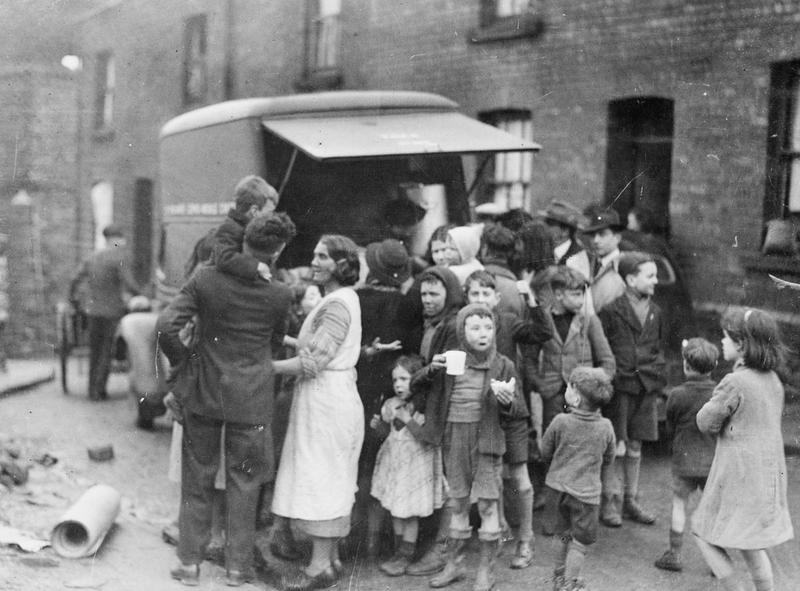
Mothers and children in a working class area of Swansea have tea and sandwiches from a mobile canteen after a night's bombing.

By the end of February 1941 the HAA guns in the Swansea GDA still only numbered 18 out of a planned establishment of 36. These were distributed to sites as follows:

- N1 Llansamlet – 4 x 3.7-inch (247 Bty)
- N2 Neath – 4 x 3.7-inch (246 Bty)
- N3 Jersey Marine – 4 x 3.7-inch (247 Bty)
- N4 Ravenhill (under construction by 246 Bty)
- N5 Mumbles – 4 x 3.7-inch (248 Bty)
- N6 Sketty – 2 x 3.7-inch (248 Bty)

These had been increased a month later to 36, though an additional 18 were already being called for by 9th Anti-Aircraft Division. 398 HAA Battery, formed by a cadre from 79th (HY) HAA Rgt (see below) joined the regiment from 207th HAA Training Rgt, Devizes, on 10 March 1941 to take over N8 (Margam) and N10 (Morfa Mawr). The newly formed 384 and 386 Btys of 120th HAA Rgt also came under operational command of 79th (HY) HAA Rgt.

After a last burst of enemy activity in early May, the Blitz came to an end, and there was little more activity until the end of the year. The equipment of the gunsites round Swansea was improved and 437 HAA Bty, also raised from a cadre provided by the regiment (see below), was regimented on 10 July and joined in August, while 248 Bty was transferred to 120th HAA Rgt (see below).

=== Mobile training ===
On 3 January 1942, 79th (HY) HAA Rgt was ordered to convert from a four-battery static organisation to a three-battery mobile unit in preparation for overseas service. Vehicles arrived for training in March, and in April the regiment (except 437 Bty) was relieved by 57th (Wessex) HAA Rgt. It moved to Eastleigh in Hampshire and came under control of 11 AA Bde, responsible for mobile training. Upon completion of the course, the regiment returned to its previous sites round Swansea on 16 May, but on 13 June it moved to 55 AA Bde in Cornwall to relieve another regiment for training; at this point 437 Bty transferred to 138th HAA Rgt and left the regiment permanently.

The whole South Coast of England was at the time subject to 'hit and run' raids by the Luftwaffe, and gunsites occupied by the regiment at Penzance and Truro were called into action as soon as they arrived on 15 June. A month later the relieved regiment returned, and 79th (HY) HAA Rgt moved to Hitchwood Battle Camp in Hertfordshire for infantry training. It was then sent back to South Wales to complete mobilisation by 1 September while occupying gun sites at Chepstow (246 Bty), Barry (247 Bty) and Port Talbot (398 Bty).

During October the regiment was relieved of duties under AA Command and came under War Office (WO) Control at Uttoxeter while the necessary ancillary units arrived. A practice move by road to Otterburn Training Area was followed by gunnery practice. By November the regiment had the following organisation:

- RHQ
- 246, 247, 398 HAA Btys (each 8 x 3.7-inch)
- 79th HAA Rgt Signal Section, Royal Corps of Signals
- 79th HAA Workshop, Royal Electrical and Mechanical Engineers (REME)
- 79th HAA Rgt Platoon, Royal Army Service Corps (RASC) – later redesignated 1521 HAA Rgt Platoon

=== Operation Torch ===
79th (HY) HAA Regiment now formed part of First Army, the leading elements of which landed at Algiers in French North Africa as part of Operation Torch on 8 November. However, the regiment did not begin to load its guns and equipment on various transport ships until 2 January 1943, and the personnel finally embarked on HM Transport Dunnottar Castle at Glasgow on 20 January.

The Dunottar Castle docked at Algiers on 1 February, where the regiment's baggage party and '1st Reinforcements' remained while the frontline personnel embarked on the Landing Ships, Infantry (LSIs) HMS Royal Scotsman and HMS Royal Ulsterman for forward transport to Bône in eastern Algeria. The ships carrying the regiment's guns and equipment docked at Algiers, Bône and Philippeville on 8 and 9 February, but two vessels had been sunk en route and all of 247 Bty's guns and towing vehicles were lost, as well as the light vehicles of 398 Bty and the REME workshop.

While 247 Bty remained at Bône providing guards for 66 AA Bde HQ and 209 Prisoner of War Camp, 246 and 398 Btys and their guns were assembled at Philippeville, where Lt-Col Dickinson of 79th (HY) HAA Rgt was appointed AADC by 66 AA Bde on 14 February. He had elements of 64th LAA Rgt and 30th (Surrey) Searchlight Rgt under his control, later joined by a Z Rocket battery. The vulnerable areas to be defended were the port and fuel terminal, and Philippeville Airfield when it became operational. The town was designated as an Inner Artillery Zone (IAZ) in which AA guns had priority over fighters. During February and March the regiment sited its guns, and sited and resited its GL sets to find good reception areas. 398 Battery had two engagements on 4 and 19 March against low-flying aircraft: the gun positions fired Shrapnel shell from their 3.7-inch guns and used the twin Bren LMGs with which they were equipped for close defence. By the end of March the Philippeville defences under 79th (HY) HAA Rgt were as follows:

- RHQ
- 'H' AA Operations Room
- 246/79 HAA Bty (8 x 3.7-inch)
- 398/79 HAA Bty (8 x 3.7-inch)
- 285/64 LAA Bty (18 x Bofors 40mm guns)
- C Troop, 193/64 LAA Bty (6 x Bofors)
- 184 AA 'Z' Bty (12 x 9-barrel projectors at Philippeville airfield)
- One troop 567/30 S/L Rgt (6 x radar-controlled S/Ls)
- 263 Company, Pioneer Corps (smoke-producing)
- C Flight, 985 (Barrage Balloon) Squadron, RAF (18 x balloons)

In April, 247 Bty was able to draw new 3.7-inch guns from the base ordnance depot and install them at two new sites at Philippeville that the battery had constructed over the preceding two months. There were three raids on the town, on 21, 27 and 28 April, when the AA fire was generally successful in deflecting the bombers from their targets.

Enemy resistance in North Africa ceased on 12 May 1943, but AA defence of the Algerian ports continued while they were used to prepare for the invasion of Sicily (Operation Husky). AA engagements were usually against single high-flying reconnaissance aircraft, with one significant raid on the night of 17/18 June. 246 AA Battery was moved to Bône in July, followed in September by RHQ, 'H' (now 40) AAOR and 247 Bty, where the regiment took over operational control of 180 HAA Bty of 64th HAA Rgt, 567 S/L Bty and 124 AA 'Z' Bty. The OC of 398 HAA Bty became AADC of the reduced Philippeville IAZ.

During the winter of 1943–4, responsibility for the AA defence of the Bône–Philippeville area passed from 66 AA Bde to 52 AA Bde and 44 AA Artillery Brigade, US Army. Meanwhile, 79th (HY) HAA Rgt prepared for service in the Italian Campaign with training in mobile warfare and ground shooting. On 26 March 1944, the regiment handed over to French troops and sailed from Bône and Algiers.

=== Italy ===
79th (HY) HAA Regiment disembarked from transports at Naples between 27 March and 14 April to join 52 AA Bde defending the Foggia Airfield Complex. Lt-Col Dickinson was appointed Deputy AADC for the Spinazzola Group of airfields, with batteries of 64th LAA and 106th HAA Rgt under command. By 3 May the regiment was deployed as follows:

- Canosa:
  - RHQ and GOR
- Lesina Airfield (306th Fighter Wing, US Army Air Forces):
  - L1: A Trp, 246 HAA Bty (4 x 3.7-inch)
  - L2: B Trp, 246 HAA Bty (4 x 3.7-inch)
- Venosa Airfield (485th Bombardment Group USAAF):
  - V1: D Trp, 247 HAA Bty (4 x 3.7-inch)
  - V2: C Trp, 247 HAA Bty (4 x 3.7-inch)
  - F Trp, 193/64 LAA Bty (6 x Bofors)
- Pantanella Airfield (464th and 465th Bombardment Groups USAAF):
  - P1: F Trp, 398 HAA Bty (4 x 3.7-inch)
  - P2: E Trp, 398 HAA Bty (4 x 3.7-inch)
  - G & H Trps, 285/64 LAA Rgt (12 x Bofors)
- Spinazzola Airfield (460th Bombardment Group USAAF):
  - S1: A Trp, 332/106 HAA Bty, (4 x 3.7-inch)
  - S2: B Trp, 332/106 HAA Bty (4 x 3.7-inch)
  - J Trp, 285/64 LAA Bty (6 x Bofors)

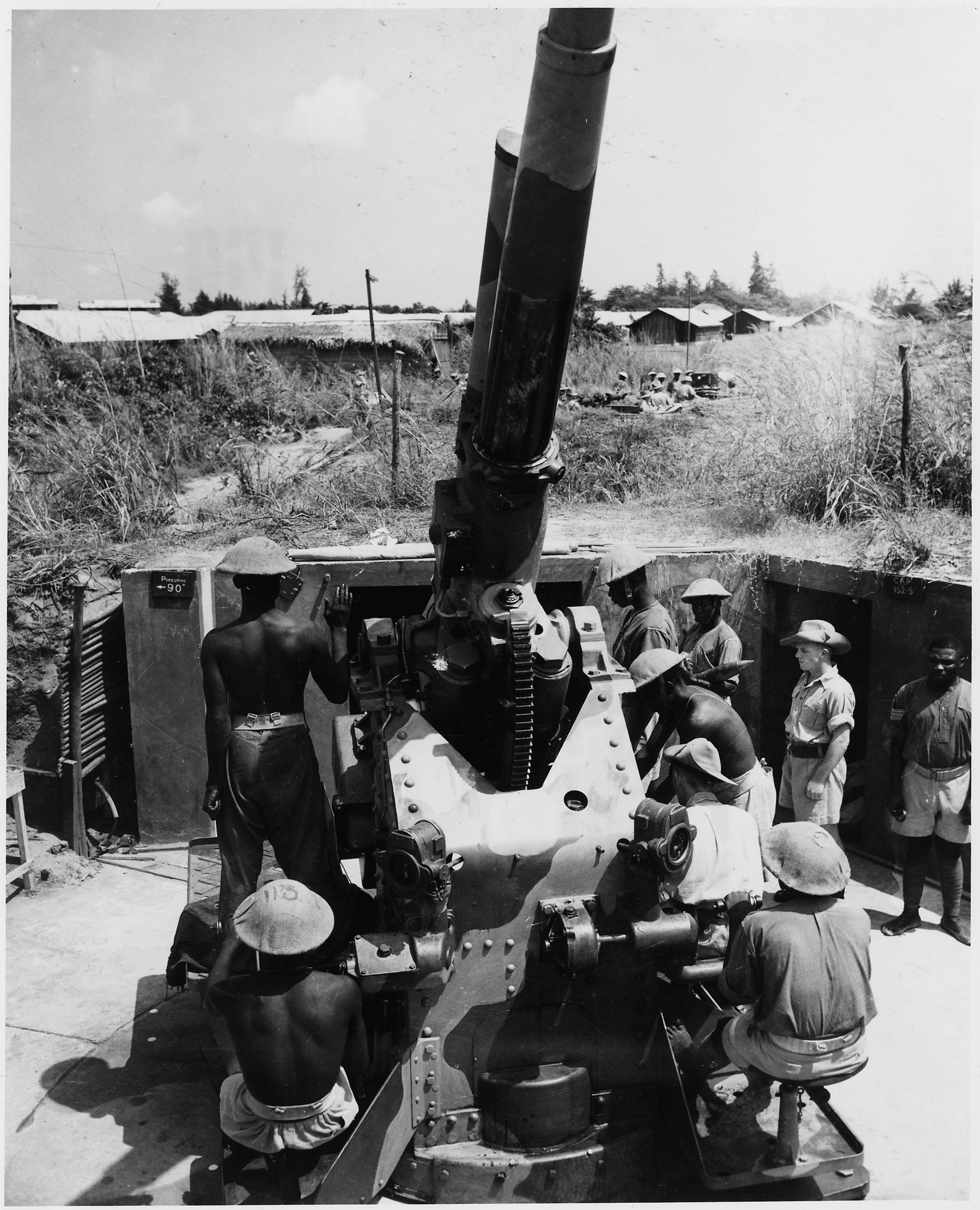
African gunners being trained on a 3.7-inch HAA gun in Italy, 1944.

In June 1944 the regiment was 'diluted' (as the process was officially described) by Basuto troops from the African Pioneer Corps. Each battery received 81 ORs from 1932 Dilution Company to be trained as gunners at L1 site at Lesina Airfield. In practice, Nos 1 and 4 of each nine-man gun crew remained British ORs, the other seven numbers being African. Twelve British ORs from each battery formed a new plotting detachment while the remaining 190 surplus gunners were transferred to the infantry (those aged under 40) or to other Royal Artillery units or the Royal Signals (over-40s).

In July the regiment was withdrawn from operational duties and began mobile training pending a move to Allied Force Headquarters in northern Italy. The fully mobile establishment required additional drivers and other specialists, who were obtained from 100th HAA Rgt, which was being disbanded. The regiment also practised firing against ground targets. It began moving north on 25 August, reaching the River Arno at Leghorn (Livorno) on 28 August, having detached 398 Bty to take over AA defence of Porto Santo Stefano, some 80 miles down the coast. The regiment deployed to sites as follows:

- 246 Bty
  - A Trp to site W (4 miles south of Pisa) in dual AA/field role
  - B Trp to site LH7 (immediately east of Leghorn) in AA role
- 247 Bty
  - C Trp to site LH4 (northern outskirts of Leghorn) in AA role
  - D Trp to site Y (7 miles north of Leghorn) in dual AA/field role

As soon as it arrived, D Troop began firing ground shoots in direct support of 39th LAA Rgt acting as infantry, knocking out German 88mm Flak guns (also operating in a dual field role) and in harassing fire tasks. Calls for ground fire slackened after US IV Corps crossed the Arno on 1 September, and the batteries took up positions on the far side of the river. The regiment reverted to AA duties, except for No 1 Gun (codenamed 'Arthur Gun') of A Trp, which came under operational command of 71st (Forth) HAA Rgt and was kept busy with observed fire tasks. B Troop's No 3 Gun took over as 'Arthur Gun' on 14 September, and was in turn relieved by a gun from C Trp. Before the 'Arthur Gun' detachment was withdrawn on 8 October, its average daily ammunition expenditure was 70 rounds, peaking at 140 on 2 October.

In October the regiment left US Fifth Army and crossed Italy again to join 12 AA Bde in British Eighth Army at Rimini. The journey on muddy mountain roads was particularly difficult. On arrival it took over established gun positions, including its first GL Mk. III radar sets and twin 0.5-inch Browning machine guns to replace the twin Brens. In November some of the guns were pushed forward to defend a landing-ground at Bellaria and Lt-Col Dickinson became AADC Bellaria and Rimini Landing Grounds and Rimini Railhead.

In January 1945 the regiment learned that it was to be disbanded. The African ORs transferred to 57th (Wessex) HAA Rgt, the British ORs to the infantry or other RA units. 79th (HY) HAA Rgt with 246, 247 and 398 HAA Btys passed into 'suspended animation on 10 March 1945.

=== 248 (Welwyn) HAA Battery ===
See main article: 248th (Welwyn) Heavy Anti-Aircraft Battery, Royal Artillery

On 20 mid-August 1941, 248 Battery was transferred to bolster the inexperienced 120th HAA Rgt which was moving from 61 AA Bde to 26 (London) AA Bde in 1st Anti-Aircraft Division defending the London IAZ. It remained there for over a year, serving through the desultory Luftwaffe raids of 1942, with 248 Bty manning various static 3.7-inch and 4.5-inch gunsites round London.

In mid-January 1943, 120th HAA Rgt left 26 AA Bde and came under WO Control to mobilise as a defended ports unit. After two months at the mobilisation centre at Easthampstead in Berkshire it sailed from Liverpool on 14 March and disembarked at Port Tewfik, Egypt, on 6 May. Here it came under Middle East Forces. After a month in Egypt it was moved by railway to Beirut and then by sea to Cyprus, where it landed on 14 June to take over AA defence of ports and airfields on the island under 20 AA Bde in Ninth Army.

At the end of October 1943, 248 Bty was 'diluted' by a draft of 80 ORs of the African Pioneer Corps. The state of readiness in Cyprus was relaxed in March 1944 and the AA defences on the island were run down during April. The remaining personnel moved to Cairo where 120th HAA Rgt, including 248 (Welwyn) Bty, was disbanded in May–June 1944.

=== Cadres ===
Between 1940 and 1942, 79th (HY) HAA Rgt provided cadres to form the following new batteries. Each cadre comprised a battery commander-designate, 1–3 other officers and 9–21 other ranks who were pre-war Territorials embodied in August 1939:

- 364 HAA Bty: cadre transferred to 209th HAA Training Rgt, Blandford, 15 September 1940. Battery initially regimented with 79th (HY) HAA, joined 116th HAA Rgt 10 December 1940.
- 398 HAA Bty: cadre transferred to 207th HAA Training Rgt, Devizes, 12 December 1940. Battery joined 79th (HY) HAA Rgt 10 March 1941, and served with the regiment until March 1945.
- 437 HAA Bty: cadre transferred to 206th HAA Training Rgt, Arborfield, 22 May 1941. The soldier intake for this battery came from 257 and 260 LAA Btys, which had been recently formed and then disbanded. The battery joined 79th (HY) HAA Rgt (replacing 248 (Welwyn) HAA Bty) 20 August 1941, and served with the regiment until transferred to 138th HAA Rgt on 11 June 1942.
- 496 (Mixed) HAA Bty: cadre transferred to 206th HAA Training Rgt, Arborfield, 10 November 1941. The male soldier intake came from 224 LAA Troop, originally formed on the outbreak of war to defend RAF Hullavington. The battery joined 143rd (Mixed) HAA Rgt 2 February 1942 and transferred to 171st (Mixed) HAA Rgt 29 August 1942.
- 526 (Mixed) HAA Bty: cadre transferred to 207th HAA Training Rgt, Devizes, 29 January 1942. Battery joined 154th (Mixed) HAA Rgt 20 April 1942.

'Mixed' indicated units where women from the ATS were integrated into the unit; in the case of HAA batteries they provided approximately two-thirds of the personnel.

== Postwar ==
=== 479 (Hertfordshire Yeomanry) HAA Regiment, RA ===
When the TA was reconstituted on 1 January 1947, 79th (HY) HAA Rgt was reformed as 479 (Mobile) (Hertfordshire Yeomanry) HAA Regiment, with HQ at St Albans Road, Barnet and batteries at Barnet, Watford and Welwyn Garden City. (The regiment's old number was taken by the Regular 7th HAA Rgt, which became 79th HAA Rgt) Recruitment for the new TA regiment opened on 31 May 1947. As a designated mobile unit it was equipped with towed 3.7-inch guns and radar, intended to form part of 82 AA Bde (the former 56th Light AA Bde). However in practice it served under 63 (North London) AA Bde, the former 37 AA Bde, which was an exclusively HAA formation.

In 1951, the Watford Battery was able to move into a new drill hall at Croxley Green, the site having been purchased before the Second World War, and then moved out of the cramped Clarendon Hall which it had shared with 1st Battalion Hertfordshire Regiment. That year a REME Light Aid Detachment was formed for the regiment.

AA Command was disbanded on 10 March 1955 and the number of AA units in the TA was drastically reduced. 479 (HY) HAA Regiment amalgamated back into its former parent regiment, now 286 (Hertfordshire Yeomanry) Medium Rgt based at St Albans. Combined batteries were formed at Watford and Welwyn Garden City. Most personnel of the Barnet Battery chose to transfer to 557 Tank Transporter Company, RASC. Others decided to join the Mobile Defence Corps.

=== 8th (Hertfordshire & Cambridgeshire) Battalion, MDC ===
When 479 (HY) HAA Rgt amalgamated with 286 (HY) Medium Rgt in March 1955, a group of volunteers from 479 formed the nucleus for a battalion of the Mobile Defence Corps (MDC). The MDC was being formed at the time to provide trained military support for the Civil Defence Corps and Fire Services on a regional basis. The units were formed in the Army Emergency Reserve (AER) from volunteers and National Servicemen (Army and Royal Air Force) who were approaching demobilisation and who were posted after training to their local MDC battalion for their subsequent compulsory part-time service. The firefighting requirement was dropped but the rescue battalions were organised. The men from 479th HAA Rgt provided the basis for 8th (Hertfordshire and Cambridgeshire) Battalion of the MDC, with HQ at Barnet, recruiting from across both counties. When the MDC was disbanded in February 1959 those members of 8th Bn who wished to continue in the AER transferred to the Royal Army Ordnance Corps.

== Commanding Officers ==
The following served as Commanding Officer of 79th and 479th HAA Rgt:

- Lt-Col T.L.L. Bazley Green, TD, 1 October 1938 – 15 January 1940 (to Home Office Air Raid Precautions Department)
- Lt-Col R.P. Gatehouse, 16 January–24 February 1940
- Lt-Col R.C.M. Raikes, OBE, 24 February 1940–December 1941 (to command 5 AA Brigade)
- Lt-Col A. B. De C. Dickinson, December 1941–10 March 1945
- Lt-Col R.N. Hanbury, OBE, 1 May 1947 – 31 March 1950 (to command 63 (North London) AA Bde)
- Lt-Col G.W.A. Tufton, TD, 1 April 1950 – 31 August 1953
- Lt-Col J.A. Chaplin, TD, 1 September 1953 – 30 June 1955

== Honorary Colonel ==
The following officers served as Honorary Colonel of the regiment:

- Lt-Col T.H. Sebag-Montefiore, DSO, MC, RA retired, 17 May 1939 to 17 May 1944<
- Lt-Col T.L.L. Bazley-Green, original CO, 17 May 1944–May 1949
- Lt-Gen Arthur Percival, CB, DSO and Bar, MC, 1949–54
- Brigadier R.N. Hanbury, OBE, one of the original officers and former CO, appointed on 26 December 1954; retained the position after the merger into 286 Rgt until 1963, and was also Hon Col of the Bedfordshire and Hertfordshire Regiment 1967–71.

== Prominent members ==
- Lieutenant Desmond Flower, 10th Viscount Ashbrook was among the officers appointed to the new regiment; he had previously served in the ranks of the 54th (City of London) HAA Rgt, and ended the Second World War as a major.
- Captain John Vincent Holland, Indian Army retired, who had won a Victoria Cross during the First World War, was the administrative officer of the regiment when it was embodied in June 1939.
- Lieutenant Peter Heber-Percy, descended from Bishop Hugh Percy, had served for two years as a Regular RA officer before becoming a stockbroker. An original officer of the regiment, having transferred from 54th (City of London) HAA Rgt, he ended the Second World War as a Lt-Col and CO of 55th (Kent) HAA Rgt and was awarded the OBE.
- Second-Lieutenant Peter Compton Spencer-Smith, nephew of Sir Drummond Hamilton-Spencer-Smith, 5th Bt, was another original officer of the regiment, having transferred from 54th (City of London) HAA Rgt; he ended the Second World War as a major.

== Insignia ==
On formation, 79th (HY) HAA Rgt adopted the same badges and uniform distinctions as 86th (HY) Fd Rgt, including the Hertfordshire Yeomanry's hart badge worn as a collar badge in addition to the RA cap badge, and later as a cap badge on side caps and berets.

Post-war, 479 (HY) HAA Rgt used the same beret and collar badges as 286 (HY) Fd Rgt: a hart surrounded by a strap inscribed 'Herts Yeomanry' and surmounted by a crown. Officers wore the hart collar badge in bronze below their rank badges in battledress. It was also used as a vehicle marking, painted in gold on the doors. In 1953 the regiment adopted the old 'Harts [sic] Yeomanry Cavalry' button in place of the RA pattern, and RA cap badges were completely abandoned. Cavalry-style shoulder chains were worn in No 1 dress. The AA Command formation badge was worn on both sleeves in battledress.

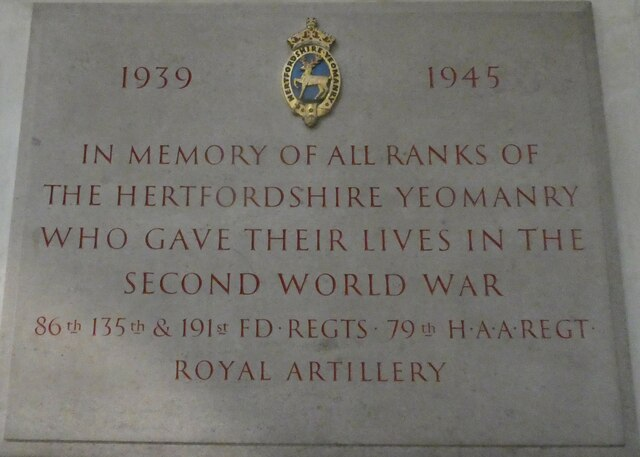
Herts Yeomanry 1939–1945 memorial.

== Memorial ==
A memorial tablet to the men of all four Hertfordshire Yeomanry artillery regiments who died during the Second World War was unveiled in St Albans Abbey on 19 September 1954.
