= Murex (disambiguation) =

Murex is a genus of medium to large sized predatory tropical sea snails.

Murex may also refer to:

- SS Murex (1892) early bulk-oil tanker ship named after the sea snail
- Murex (company) British iron industry plant firm
- Murex d'Or Lebanese art prize
- Murex (financial software) Platform for trading, hedging, funding, risk management or processing operations
- Murex L. ex Kuntze, a taxonomic synonym of the plant genus Pedalium
