= 248th (Welwyn) Heavy Anti-Aircraft Battery, Royal Artillery =

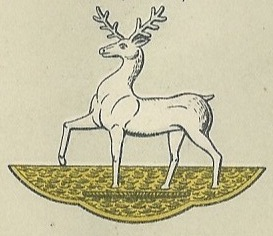
- The Hertfordshire Yeomanry badge worn as a collar badge by 248 (Welwyn) HAA Battery
- Active: 1 November 1938 – 10 March 1955
- Country: United Kingdom
- Branch: Territorial Army
- Type: Heavy Anti-Aircraft Battery
- Role: Air Defence
- Part of: 79th (Hertfordshire Yeomanry) HAA Regiment; 120th HAA Regiment
- Garrison/HQ: Welwyn Garden City
- Engagements: Battle of France; Swansea Blitz; Defence of London; Defence of Cyprus

248th (Welwyn) Heavy Anti-Aircraft Battery, Royal Artillery (248 HAA Bty), was an air defence unit of Britain's Territorial Army (TA). Formed just before the Second World War, it fought in the Battle of France and the Swansea Blitz, and later defended London and Cyprus. It continued serving in the post-war TA until 1955.

== Origin ==
During the period of international tension in 1938, the TA was rapidly expanded, particularly for the Anti-Aircraft (AA) role. Much of this expansion was achieved by converting and/or expanding existing units. 343 (Watford) Field Battery was separated from 86th (East Anglian) (Herts Yeomanry) Field Brigade, Royal Artillery (partly descended from the old Hertfordshire Yeomanry cavalry) and converted into a complete new AA regiment, 79th (Hertfordshire Yeomanry) AA Regiment, Royal Artillery. Regimental headquarters (RHQ) and two of the batteries (246 (1st Watford) and 247 (2nd Watford)) remained at Watford, while the third (248) was newly raised at Welwyn Garden City.

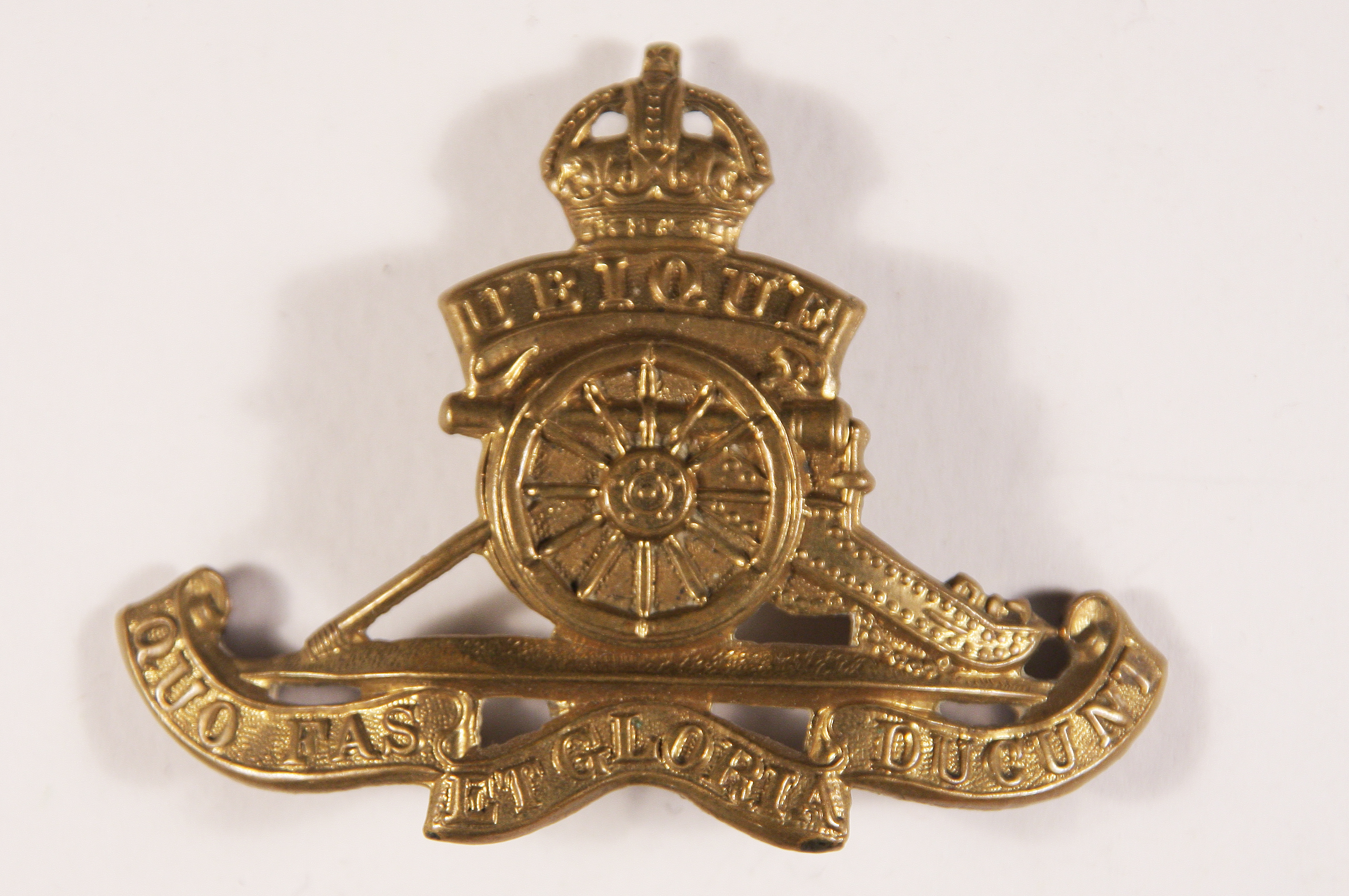
RA cap badge

The Hertfordshire Territorial Association obtained a site from the Welwyn Garden City Estate Office at Lemsford Lane where a drill hall could be built and recruitment for the new battery began on 14 November 1938. Supported by the local newspaper, public meetings and letters to local employers, recruitment went well and by March 1939 was close to the establishment of 172. Captain F.D.E. Fremantle of the 86th Field Regiment was appointed officer commanding (OC) of 248 Bty with the rank of Major. Training had to be carried out on two QF 3.7-inch AA guns borrowed from a London AA battery.

== Mobilisation ==
In June 1939, as the international situation worsened, a partial mobilisation of Anti-Aircraft Command was begun in a process known as 'couverture', whereby each TA AA unit did a month's tour of duty in rotation to man selected gun positions. 79th (HY) AA Regiment was embodied on 25 June for a partial deployment to gunsites along the south bank of the Thames Estuary, with 248 Bty at Brookley Park, Lewisham. The availability of equipment at the gunsites was invaluable for training the recruits, and the second half of the month's embodiment was spent at the AA Practice Camp at Bude in Cornwall, where 248 Battery scored a direct hit on a Queen Bee radio-controlled target aircraft.

On 24 August, ahead of the declaration of war, AA Command was fully mobilised and sent to its war stations, which in the case of 79th (HY) AA Rgt were to defend airfields of 11 Group of RAF Fighter Command. One section of 248 Bty manned two 3-inch guns at RAF Biggin Hill while the rest of the battery manned Lewis Light machine guns (LMGs) at RAF Felixstowe (8 LMGs) and RAF Martlesham Heath (12 LMGs).

== Second World War ==
=== Phoney War ===
After war was declared on 3 September there were numerous adjustments to AA Command's deployment as further units and equipment became available. During the autumn 79th (HY) AA Rgt handed over most of its responsibilities for airfields, and shifted towards the Gun Defence Area (GDA) round the port of Harwich and adjacent harbours. 248 Battery was deployed as follows:

- 2 x 3.7-inch at site H2 (Trimley, Felixstowe)
- 2 x 3.7-inch at site H3 (Dovercourt)
- 20 x AA LMG at RAF Martlesham Heath
- 20 x AA LMG at Parkeston Quay, Harwich

On 17 October the battery fired the regiment's first rounds in anger, when sites H2 and H3 engaged an aircraft identified as hostile. The War Establishment of the battery was now 290 all ranks, and on 21 October a draft of 132 recruits (Militiamen with 3 months' AA training) arrived, after which the 125 men who were aged under 19 or over 38, or who were unfit for overseas service, were posted away in early November.

On 26 December a warning order was received to prepare to move overseas, and the detachments concentrated at Harwich. The regiment was designated as a base defence AA regiment to man static 3.7-inch guns. 248 Battery was already experienced with the 3.7-inch and only needed to attend short courses by sections on a static gun site at Dartford, Kent before mobilising at Blackdown Camp near Aldershot. Here it was issued with vehicles (many of them impressed civilian lorries) and joined by a draft of 62 Militia reinforcements from Yorkshire to bring it up to full establishment.

=== France ===
248 Battery proceeded from Blackdown to Southampton and sailed for France on the night of 7/8 February 1940. It landed at Le Havre where it came under the operational command of 8th (Belfast) AA Rgt in 3 AA Bde guarding the lines of communication for the British Expeditionary Force (BEF). It was to remain at Le Havre to man two static 3.7-inch gun positions at Parc de la Hève on the edge of the cliff in front of the lighthouse. The concrete pits were built and guns emplaced by 27 February and a Gun-Laying (GL) Radar Mk I was set up. While this was being done, Nos 2 and 3 Sections manned the guns at Octeville Airfield. The rest of the regiment disembarked on 6 March and deployed around the port and airfield. 79th (HY) AA Regiment devised an AA barrage scheme using fixed bearings and staggered heights over the docks and oil storage tanks for 'unseen' fire at night; this was codenamed 'Pillar of Fire'.

The Battle of France began on 10 May with the German invasion of the Low Countries and France. The BEF followed the pre-arranged Plan D and advanced into Belgium, but a rapid German breakthrough in the Ardennes forced it to fall back again. By 21 May the main body of the BEF was cut off, and between 26 May and 4 June as much as possible was evacuated through Dunkirk (Operation Dynamo).

From 10 to 19 May the only Luftwaffe activity in the Le Havre area had been daily reconnaissance flights, but on the night of 19/20 May there was a three-hour raid on the French airfield at Octeville, during which 'Pillar of fire' brought down an enemy aircraft, followed on succeeding nights by attempts to drop Parachute mines into the harbour entrance. Even after the Dunkirk evacuation ended, there were still British forces in France north of the Seine, and 79th (HY) HAA Rgt maintained its defences at Le Havre covering the Seine ferries. Nightly air attacks on the harbour area began in earnest on 3/4 June, with the guns in action for long periods.

By 8 June, under renewed German attacks, 1st Armoured Division, 51st (Highland) Division and assorted other British forces were withdrawing to the Seine. That night, with much of the town and oil depots set on fire by the raids, 'Cuckoo Section' of 79th (HY) AA Rgt ferried the highly secret GL radar transmitter trailers and their receiver trailers across the river to Honfleur, followed by the mobile guns. With the enemy closing on Le Havre (51st (H) Division was cut off and forced to surrender), 3 AA Bde was ordered to evacuate. On the night of 11/12 June RHQ and most of 248 Bty boarded SS St Briac, which took them to Cherbourg, while a party of 248 Bty destroyed the remaining static guns.

Operation Aerial, to evacuate the remainder of the British forces from France, was now under way. From Cherbourg, RHQ and the batteries without equipment were shunted by train between Nantes and Rennes before being evacuated from St Nazaire aboard SS Duchess of York and reaching Liverpool on 18 June. The party of 248 Bty that had stayed to disable the guns was evacuated through St Malo.

=== Home Defence ===
The bulk of 79th (HY) Heavy AA Rgt (as AA units were designated from June 1940 to distinguish them from Light AA) was accommodated in guest houses in Blackpool before attending No 1 AA Practice Camp at Aberporth in West Wales. It was then ordered to join 45 AA Bde in South Wales as part of 5 AA Division. The regiment relieved batteries of 77th (Welsh) HAA Rgt at Cardiff to allow them to attend Aberporth in turn. Two sections of 248 Bty spent over a month at Cardiff, with the guns in action against almost daily air raids during the Battle of Britain.

By early September, the regiment was concentrated round the Swansea GDA, where RHQ and 248 Bty set up a Gun Operations Room (GOR) in two Requisitioned houses and arranged a barrage scheme codenamed 'Ball of Fire'. Two sections of 248 Bty occupied V site near Neath with the 3-inch guns brought from Cardiff, but these guns did not have the range to cover Swansea, so the battery exchanged with 246 Bty at T site at Sketty. These guns were replaced with 3-7-inch at the end of December. During October, 248 Bty began constructing a new gunsite (S) at Mumbles, which broke away from convention by positioning the emplacements at the corners of a field, concealed in the hedges and served by the existing road, rather than grouped in the centre of the field with visible access tracks. The position was completed and guns mounted in December. The new elevation-finding (E/F or 'Effie') attachment for the GL Mk I radar was also installed.

During the winter, 79th (HY) HAA Rgt provided cadres for new batteries forming at the training regiments. It also took in a draft of local Welsh recruits for basic training, some of whom stayed with the regiment afterwards, and then trained an intake of older men for 'Z' Battery Rocket units.

=== Swansea Blitz ===
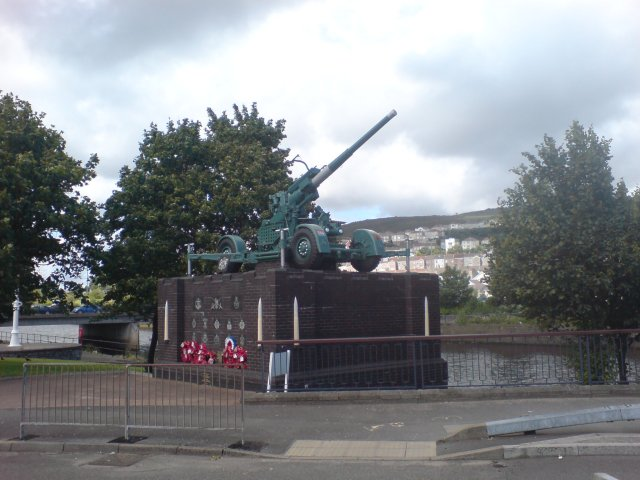
A mobile 3.7-inch gun surmounts the monument erected to the air defence of Swansea, particularly the night of 21 February 1941.

There was enemy air activity over the Bristol Channel and South Wales coast on most nights, but usually these were reconnaissances or nuisance raids. Heavier raids against Swansea began on 4/5 January 1941, when a bomb put all the GOR telephone lines out of action, but 248 Bty at S and T sites was able to continue with 'Ball of Fire' barrages controlled by T site's GL radar with Effie providing angles of sight. 248 Battery's S and T sites were heavily engaged again on 17/18 January as the German aircraft bombed systematically across the town. One aircraft was destroyed that night.

By the beginning of February 1941 the HAA guns in the Swansea GDA still only numbered 18 out of a planned establishment of 36. The battery was responsible for the following renamed sites:

- N5 – Mumbles – 4 x 3.7-inch
- N6 – Sketty – 2 x 3.7-inch

In February 1941 the Luftwaffe began a new tactic of hitting the same towns on successive nights in an attempt to put them completely out of action. Swansea was the first town so attacked. On the night of 19/20 February the building housing RHQ and the GOR was destroyed by a direct hit during a heavy raid, but the guns continued firing under local control and communications were maintained, once again through N6 site. A temporary GOR was established at 248 Bty HQ.

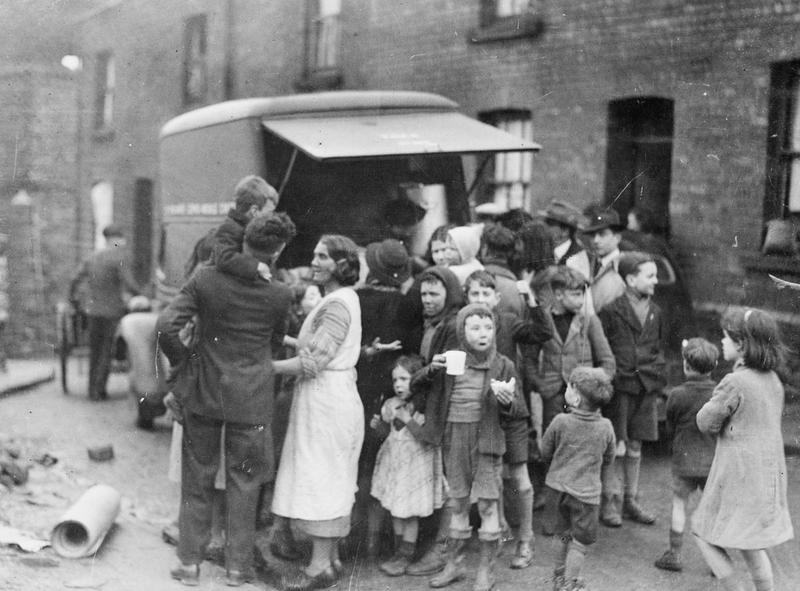
Mothers and children in a working class area of Swansea have tea and sandwiches from a mobile canteen after a night's bombing.

The Luftwaffe returned to continue the 'Swansea Blitz' on the nights of 20/21 and 21/22 February. On the latter night there was confusion between the Sector Operations Room at RAF Pembrey and the temporary GOR, resulting in the guns ceasing fire between 20.20 and 21.10, leaving the town centre unprotected. Although some raiders were shot down once the restriction was lifted, the centre of Swansea was devastated, and fires and delayed-action bombs destroyed communications. The GOR had to be temporarily relocated again to Neath.

The number of HAA guns in the Swansea GDA was increased when two batteries of the newly formed 120th HAA Rgt came under the operational command of 79th (HY) HAA Rgt, and 248 Bty was brought up to its full establishment of eight guns. However, activity was now limited to firing at aircraft overflying the area on the way to bomb Merseyside (12/13 March), Clydeside (13/14 March) and Bristol (16/17 March). Engagements were sporadic thereafter as the Blitz ended in May.

=== London ===
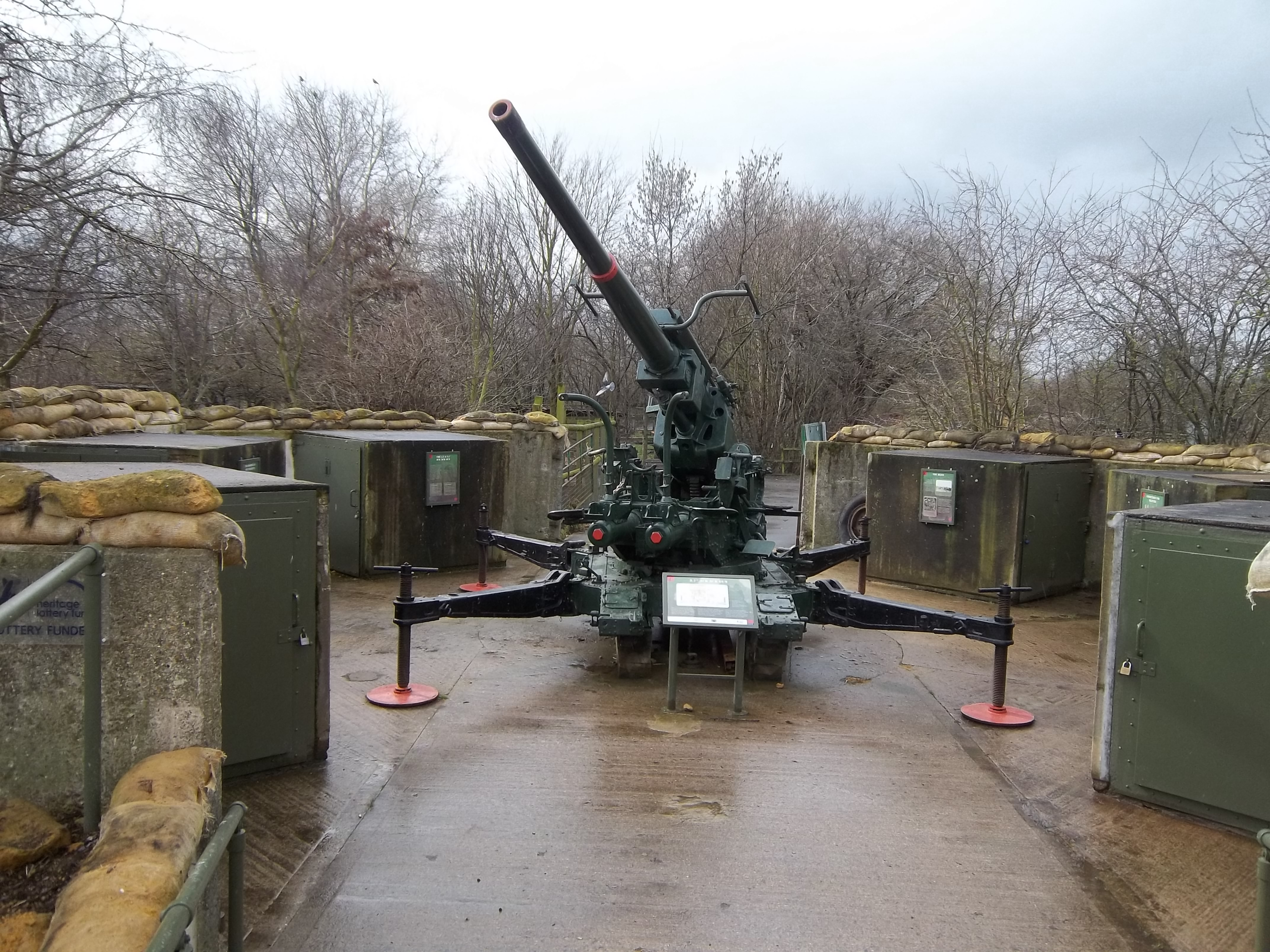
3.7-inch gun at preserved gunsite at Mudchute on the Isle of Dogs

On 20 August 1941, 248 Battery was transferred from 79th (HY) HAA Rgt to bolster the inexperienced 120th HAA Rgt, which was transferring to 26 (London) AA Bde. Between 18 and 20 August it handed over its responsibilities to a newly arrived battery and on 21 August it took over two static four-gun 3.7-inch sites in North London:

- ZW2 – Edmonton
- ZE10 – Highams

Routine moves over the coming months saw the battery occupying the following sites at various times:

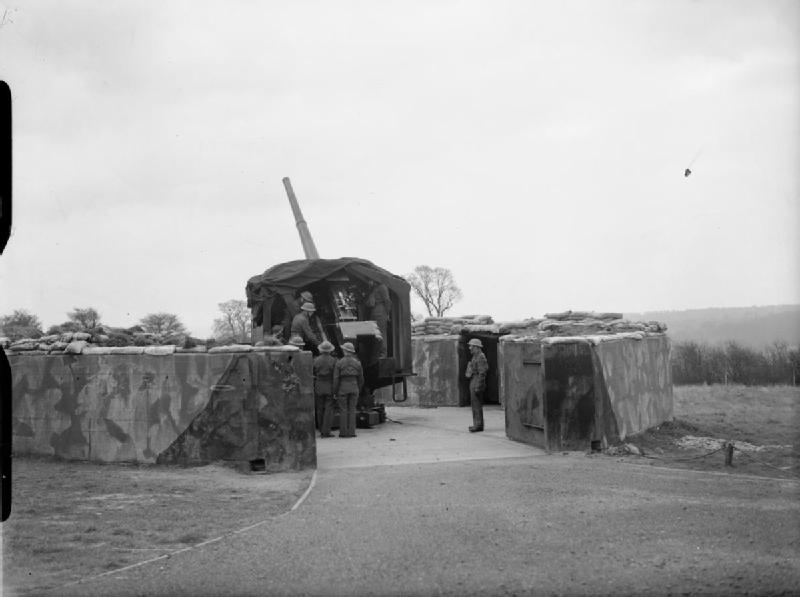
4.5-inch gunsite of the type manned by 248 (Welwyn) Bty

- ZW5 – Hyde Park
- ZW8 – Hurlingham
- ZE22 – Hampstead
- ZE5 – Clayhall
- ZW13 – Mill Hill
- ZE21 – Hackney (4 x 4.5-inch guns)
- ZE8 – Isle of Dogs (4 x 4.5-inch)

120th HAA Regiment and 248 Bty remained in and around London for over a year, serving through the desultory Luftwaffe raids of 1942.

Major Fremantle was promoted to Temporary Lieutenant-Colonel to command 140th HAA Rgt in February 1942, and was replaced as OC 248 (Welwyn) Bty by Major G.A. Reid. Lt-Col Fremantle was later awarded the Territorial Decoration and at the end of the war he was on the financial staff of Supreme Headquarters Allied Expeditionary Force in North West Europe.

=== Cyprus ===
In mid-January 1943, 120th HAA Rgt left 26 AA Bde and came under War Office control to mobilise as a defended ports unit. After two months at the mobilisation centre at Easthampstead in Berkshire it sailed from Liverpool on 14 March and disembarked at Port Tewfik in Egypt on 6 May. Here it came under Middle East Forces. After a month in Egypt it was moved by railway to Beirut and then by sea to Cyprus, where it landed on 14 June to take over AA defence of ports and airfields on the island under 20 AA Bde in Ninth Army.

248 Battery was initially deployed as follows:

- A Troop: Larnaca (4 x mobile 3.7-inch)
- B Troop: Nicosia (4 x mobile 3.7-inch)

Major M.J. Pickering took over command from Major Reid at the end of June 1943, when the unit was changed to a semi-mobile establishment. In early July, A Trp moved to Famagusta and then to Limassol in mid-August, while B Trp moved to Paphos in mid-August. In addition, detachments from the battery manned guns on the island of Castelrosso, at that time the only island of the Dodecanese in Allied hands.

At the end of October 1943, 248 Bty was 'diluted' (as the process was officially described) by a draft of 80 Basuto troops from the African Pioneer Corps to be trained as gunners, releasing a similar number of British Other Ranks for duties elsewhere. The state of readiness in Cyprus was relaxed in March 1944 and the AA defences on the island were run down during April. The remaining personnel moved to Cairo where 120th HAA Rgt, including 248 (Welwyn) Bty, was disbanded on 25 June 1944.

== Postwar ==
When the TA was reconstituted in 1947, 79th (HY) HAA Rgt was reformed as 479 (Mobile) (Hertfordshire Yeomanry) HAA Regiment, with batteries at Barnet, Watford and Welwyn Garden City. Recruitment opened on 31 May 1947. As a designated mobile unit it was equipped with towed 3.7-inch guns and radar.

AA Command was disbanded on 10 March 1955 and the number of AA units in the TA was drastically reduced. 479 (HY) HAA Regiment amalgamated back into its former parent regiment, now 286 (Hertfordshire Yeomanry) Medium Rgt based at St Albans. One of the combined batteries was formed at Welwyn Garden City.

== External sources ==
- Orders of Battle at Patriot Files
- British Army units from 1945 on
- Land Forces of Britain, the Empire and Commonwealth – Regiments.org (archive site)
- Royal Artillery 1939–1945 (archive site)
- Graham Watson, The Territorial Army 1947
