= 85th (Tees) Heavy Anti-Aircraft Regiment, Royal Artillery =

85th (Tees) Heavy Anti-Aircraft Regiment, RA 485 (Tees) Heavy Anti-Aircraft Regiment, RA
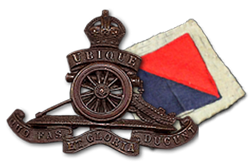
- Royal Artillery cap badge and AA patch
- Active: 1 November 1938–10 March 1955
- Country: United Kingdom
- Branch: Territorial Army
- Role: Air Defence
- Size: Regiment
- Garrison/HQ: Middlesbrough
- Engagements: Battle of France; Dunkirk evacuation The Blitz; Tunisian Campaign; Italian Campaign

85th (Tees) Heavy Anti-Aircraft Regiment, Royal Artillery (85th HAA Rgt) was a part-time unit of Britain's Territorial Army (TA) formed from forces around the river Tees just before the outbreak of World War II. Its service during the war included the Battle of France and Dunkirk evacuation, the Battle of Britain and Blitz, and the North African and Italian campaigns. It continued to serve in the air defence role until 1961.

== Origin ==
In the period of international tension of the late 1930s, the TA rapidly expanded its Anti-Aircraft (AA) capacity. 85th (Tees) Anti-Aircraft Brigade was formed in the Royal Artillery on 1 November 1938 by combining existing AA batteries from other regiments:

- Regimental Headquarters (RHQ) at the Artillery Barracks, Lytton Street, Middlesbrough
- 174th (1st North Riding) Battery at Middlesbrough – transferred from 62nd (Northumbrian) AA Regiment, originally from the 1st East Riding Artillery Volunteers
- 175th (2nd North Riding) Battery at Middlesbrough – transferred from 62nd (Northumbrian) AA Regiment, originally 292nd (2nd North Riding) Howitzer Battery from the 1st North Riding Artillery Volunteers
- 220th (County of Durham) Battery at The Armoury, West Hartlepool – transferred from 63rd (Northumbrian) AA Regiment, originally 186th and 219th (Durham) Batteries from 54th (Durham & West Riding) Medium Brigade

In common with other AA brigades, the 85th was redesignated a 'Regiment' from 1 January 1939. The first commanding officer was Lieutenant-Colonel H.J. Tortise, DSO, formerly officer commanding 292 Bty, and the regiment formed part of 43rd Anti-Aircraft Brigade covering Middlesbrough and Teesside.

== Mobilisation ==
In February 1939, the existing AA defences came under the control of a new Anti-Aircraft Command. In June a partial mobilisation of TA units was begun in a process known as 'couverture', whereby each AA unit did a month's tour of duty in rotation to man selected AA positions. That summer, 43 AA Bde came under the command of the newly formed 7 AA Division, which was created to cover North East England. Its exact responsibilities were still being worked out when war broke out. AA Command mobilised fully on 24 August, ahead of the official declaration of war on 3 September.

== France ==
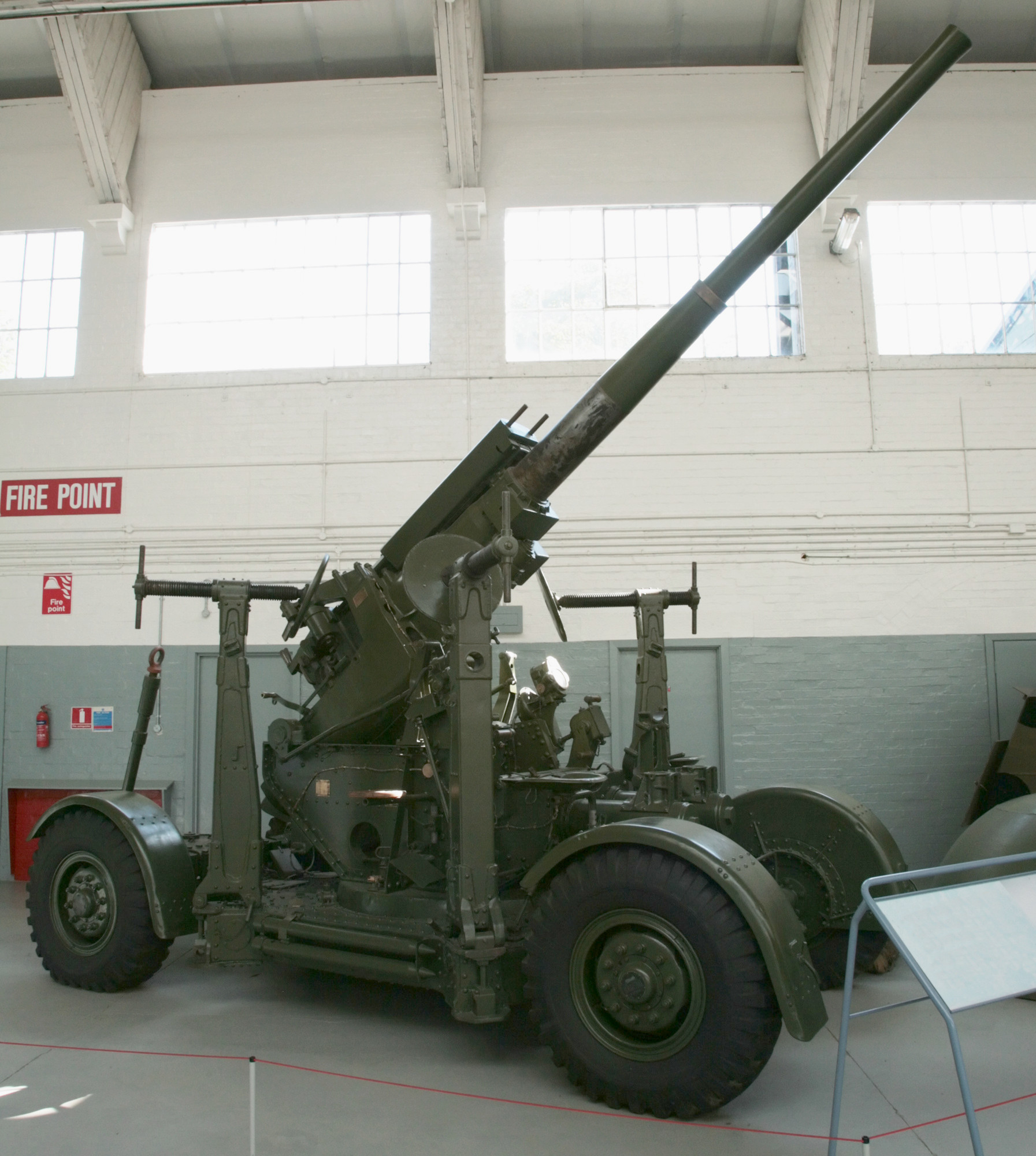
3.7-inch mobile HAA gun preserved at Imperial War Museum Duxford.

Although the regiment was recently formed, its batteries were long-established units with many experienced TA soldiers, and it was selected to form part of the air defences for the British Expeditionary Force that had been sent to France in September 1939. The regiment was equipped for semi-mobile warfare, each battery equipped with eight of the latest 3.7-inch guns, and it crossed to France on 5 April 1940 under the command of Lt-Col Tortise. On arrival it joined 1 AA Bde.

When the German offensive in the west opened on 10 May, the regiment was deployed in the area of Waziers and Douai, where B Troop under 2nd Lieutenant G.A. Coaker shot down a Heinkel He 111 and 10 minutes later A Troop shot down a Junkers Ju 88 – the BEF's first AA 'kills' in France. The BEF now advanced into Belgium in accordance with 'Plan D'. 1 AA Brigade's role was to cover Corps assembly areas and the routes used by the BEF, and 85 HAA Rgt moved right forward to Brussels and established itself at Dilbeek. Here, guns of 220 Bty under 2/Lt A.B. Carter shot down an He 111 at night with searchlight illumination, using only nine rounds, and captured the crew members who had parachuted clear.

The regiment was then ordered to defend I Corps HQ near Camphin. However, the German Army had broken through the Ardennes to the east, which forced the BEF to withdraw again. On 17 May, the regiment withdrew to Oudenaarde, on 18 to Gheluvelt, and then to the Escaut defences. On 19 May, at Orchies and Pecq, A Troop of 174 Bty received casualties from enemy field gun fire. By 21 May, the regiment was at Ploegsteert. Then, on 23 May, it received orders to move quickly to defend Dunkirk, which had been selected for the evacuation of the BEF (Operation Dynamo).

Outside Dunkirk, 174 Bty was deployed at Téteghem and 175 Bty at Leffrinckoucke, while 220 Bty was at Wavrin, south-west of Lille, all under the command of 2 AA Bde. Dunkirk was heavily bombed and machine-gunned from 24 May onwards, but only 28 rounds of 3.7-inch ammunition were available until more arrived by sea on 26 May and again on 31 May. The AA guns were ordered to remain in action while the BEF passed through them, until forced to withdraw themselves after direct contact with enemy ground forces. All non-essentials were sent off, and RHQ was established on the sand dunes east of Dunkirk. All the regiment's transport was destroyed on 27 May.

By 30 May, the air defence of the northern sector of the bridgehead comprised 174 and 175 Btys together with a few Light AA Btys, under the command of Brigadier E.W. Chadwick of 2 AA Bde. By now, some 127,000 British troops had been evacuated, but there were still 60,000 British and as many French to be got out. Many ships were lost under air attack, but the AA units were constantly in action and did their best to cover the shrinking Dunkirk 'pocket' until it was their turn to destroy their equipment and join the queues of men waiting to be taken aboard small boats back to England.

== Battle of Britain and Blitz ==
AA units returning from France were rapidly reinforced, re-equipped where possible, and redeployed for future integration into existing defence plans. 85th HAA Regiment, with 174, 175 and 220 Btys under command, went to Aberystwyth where it re-equipped with 3.7-inch guns. (On 1 June, AA units equipped with 3.7-inch guns or similar were designated Heavy AA (HAA) to distinguish them from the new Light AA (LAA) units being formed.) 5 AA Brigade HQ, also returned from Dunkirk, reformed in the Gloucester area about 18 July and took over command of 85th HAA Rgt as part of 5 AA Division. However, 174 HAA Bty was detached to South Wales to reinforce 45 AA Bde. On 12 July, Battery HQ and two sections (four guns) went to X site at Pembrey and the other two sections to T Site at Sketty on the outskirts of Swansea. Pembrey was the location of an RAF Sector Station but the guns were mainly positioned to defend a Royal Ordnance Factory explosives works.

There were low-intensity air attacks on the coastal towns of South Wales throughout the summer, at which the guns sometimes fired without effect, but on the night of 1/2 September there was a heavy bombing raid on Swansea. However, the guns at Sketty were forbidden to fire until midnight because RAF Night fighters were active. Although T site was by then integrated into a barrage line with 79th (Hertfordshire Yeomanry) HAA Rgt to defend Swansea, the two sections of 174 HAA Bty there were ordered on 11 September to move with their guns and ammunition to London, where the London Blitz had begun. When they returned a few days later they went to Z site at Pembroke Dock, and shortly afterwards the rest of the battery moved to Y site (with no guns) at Pembroke Dock. The battery occasionally engaged Luftwaffe aircraft attempting to drop Parachute mines in the harbour. In October, 220 HAA Bty was also detached to 45 AA Bde, taking up positions round Newport, though it had no guns until December, when four static 3.7-inch guns were emplaced. Y site also gained two mobile 3.7s, and the four mobile guns at Z site were joined by a GL Mk I gun-laying radar set.

In November 1940, as the Blitz was intensifying, AA Command carried out a major reorganisation: 5 AA Division's responsibilities were split, with 5 and 45 AA Bdes coming under a new 9 AA Division created to cover the South Midlands and South Wales. There were few air raids in 5 AA Bde's Gloucester–Hereford area, although the Gloster Aircraft Company's works at Brockworth and Hucclecote were targeted. 45 AA Bde's area, however, was heavily bombed (the Cardiff Blitz and Swansea Blitz) and in February 1941 responsibility was split between 45 AA Bde covering Cardiff (including 220 HAA Bty at Newport), and a new 61 AA Bde covering Swansea (including 174 HAA Bty at Pembroke Dock).

== Mid-war ==
The Blitz came to an end in mid-May 1941. 85th HAA Regiment remained part of 5 AA Bde, with the detachments to 45 AA Bde and 61 AA Bde maintained until the summer. The regiment sent a cadre to 209th HAA Training Regiment at Blandford Camp to provide the basis for a new 413 HAA Bty; this was formed on 16 January 1941 and joined the regiment on 10 April 1941. For six weeks from June to August 1941, 174 HAA Bty went to the Swansea–Port Talbot defences under 61 AA Bde to relieve three batteries in turn of 79th (HY) HAA Rgt for training at a practice camp.

The regiment sent another cadre to 206th HAA Training Regiment at Arborfield for 451 (Mixed) HAA Bty formed on 10 July 1941; this later joined a new 133rd (Mixed) HAA Rgt. ('Mixed' units were those into which women of the Auxiliary Territorial Service were integrated.) It provided a further cadre to 205th HAA Training Rgt at Arborfield for 511 (Mixed) Bty foamed on 19 January 1942 for 151st (Mixed) HAA Rgt.

By the end of 1941, 85th HAA Rgt had moved to 28 (Thames & Medway) AA Bde of 6 AA Division in South East England. 28 AA Brigade was responsible for the vital 'Thames South' AA gun layout on the south bank of the Thames Estuary, covering the eastern approaches to London and the docks and aircraft factories of the Medway Towns. The regiment remained with 28 AA Bde until it joined a new 71 AA Bde formed in 6 AA Division in May 1942. The unit now adopted the three-battery establishment of regiments selected for overseas service, and 413 HAA Bty left on 10 July to join 121st HAA Rgt. The regiment left AA Command and joined the field forces in October.

By February 1943, the regiment was in 25 AA Bde as part of the GHQ Reserve with the following organisation:

- RHQ
- 174, 175 and 220 HAA Btys (each 8 x 3.7-inch)
- 1505 HAA Rgt Section, Royal Army Service Corps
- 85 HAA Rgt Workshop Section, Royal Electrical and Mechanical Engineers

In March, the regiment transferred to the War Office Reserve preparatory to embarkation for North Africa in April.

== North Africa ==
The Allied invasion of North Africa (Operation Torch) had begun the previous November. The allocation of AA units to the force was generous, in order to defend the ports and airfields on which the campaign would depend, but their arrival was spread over a long convoy programme. 85 HAA Regiment arrived in time for the final phase of the campaign in May 1943 (Operation Vulcan). It joined 66 AA Bde, which had seen months of heavy action in defending the supply ports of Algiers and Bône. The regiment deployed with two Btys at Bône and the other covering airfields.

== Italy ==
After the fall of Tunis, the North African ports became the embarkation and supply ports for the Allied invasion of Sicily (Operation Husky) and then of mainland Italy. 85th HAA Regiment remained in their defence under 25 AA Brigade. Eventually, 25 AA Bde moved to Italy, arriving in late December 1943 to take over defence of the ports on the Adriatic coast. 85th HAA Regiment was deployed at Manfredonia with 16 x 3.7-inch guns, while 174 Bty with another eight was at Barletta.

The regiment remained in these positions during 1944. However, by now, the air threat to the southern Italian cities had diminished and Allied Forces in Italy had an excess of AA units. Meanwhile, the ground forces were suffering a manpower shortage, so a number of AA units and formations were disbanded and their personnel redistributed. 25 AA Brigade was one of those chosen for disbandment and, on 1 October 1944, 85th HAA Rgt was placed in suspended animation.

== Postwar ==
When the TA was reconstituted on 1 January 1947, the regiment was reformed at Middlesbrough as 485 (Tees) (Mixed) Heavy Anti-Aircraft Regiment, RA, ('mixed' now indicating that members of the Women's Royal Army Corps were integrated into the unit). It formed part of 56 (Northumbrian) AA Bde (the pre-war 30 (Northumbrian) Bde). On 1 January 1954, the regiment absorbed 427 (Durham) (Mixed) HAA Rgt at West Hartlepool.

AA Command was disbanded in 1955 and there were largescale mergers among its TA regiments. 485 HAA Rgt was amalgamated with 589 (Durham Light Infantry) LAA/Searchlight Rgt at Stockton-on-Tees and 590 (Durham Light Infantry) LAA Rgt at West Hartlepool to form 437 LAA Rgt with the following organisation:

- RHQ at West Hartlepool
- P (North Riding) Bty – from 485 Rgt
- Q (Stockton) Bty – from 589 Rgt
- R (Hartlepool) Bty – from 590 Rgt

On 1 May 1961, 437 LAA Rgt in turn was amalgamated into 463 (7th Durham Light Infantry) LAA/SL Rgt at Sunderland.
