= 77th Searchlight Regiment, Royal Artillery =

77th Searchlight Regiment, RA 146th Light Anti-Aircraft Regiment, RA
- Royal Artillery cap badge
- Active: 11 August 1940 – 7 June 1944
- Country: United Kingdom
- Branch: British Army
- Type: Searchlight Regiment; Light AA Regiment
- Role: Air Defence
- Engagements: Swansea Blitz

The 77th Searchlight Regiment (77th S/L Rgt) was an anti-aircraft (AA) unit of Britain's Royal Artillery (RA) formed during World War II. After serving in Anti-Aircraft Command during the Blitz it was converted into a Light Anti-Aircraft (LAA) gun unit. Although assigned to 21st Army Group for Operation Overlord, it did not go overseas and was disbanded in June 1944.

== Mobilisation and training ==
90 cm 'Projector Anti-Aircraft', displayed at Fort Nelson, Hampshire.

77th S/L Regiment was formed on 11 August 1940. The Regimental Headquarters (RHQ) had been formed earlier, apparently with the intention of taking over the newly-raised 478–481 S/L Batteries, but these had been disposed elsewhere, 479 and 480 being disbanded and their personnel posted in July 1940 to help reform 1st S/L Rgt after the Dunkirk evacuation. 77th S/L Regiment finally came into existence with four new batteries:

- 494 S/L Bty, formed by 222nd S/L Training Rgt at Taunton on 24 July, joined 15 August
- 495 and 496 S/L Btys, formed by 217th S/L Training Rgt at Hereford on 20 August, joined 15 September
- 497 S/L Bty, formed by 220th S/L Training Rgt at Yeovil on 20 August, joined 15 September

The new regiment was posted to Swansea, were about 150 Welsh recruits joined, having done their basic training with 79th (Hertfordshire Yeomanry) Heavy Anti-Aircraft Regiment, Royal Artillery, which was already stationed in Swansea.

== The Blitz ==
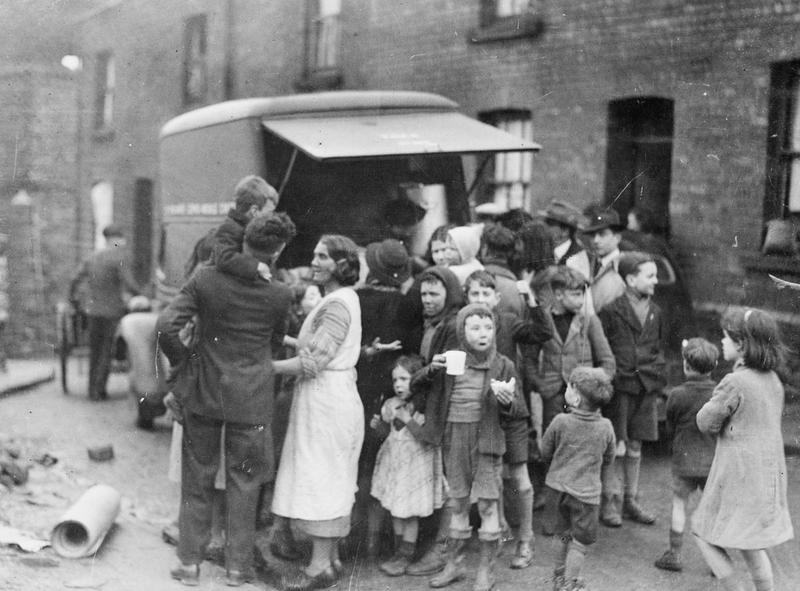
Mothers and children in a working class area of Swansea have tea and sandwiches from a mobile canteen after a night's bombing.

The new regiment formed part of 45 AA Brigade in 5 AA Division. In November 1940, however, 5 AA Division was split, and a new 9 AA Division took over South Wales. 45 AA Brigade was also split, and in February 1941 the regiment came under the newly-formed 61 AA Bde in Swansea.

At this period searchlights were deployed in clusters of three lights in an attempt to improve the chances of picking up enemy bombers and keeping them illuminated for engagement by AA guns or Royal Air Force (RAF) night-fighters. Eventually, one light in each cluster was to be equipped with Searchlight Control (SLC) radar and act as 'master light', but the radar equipment was still in short supply.

There was enemy air activity over the Bristol Channel and South Wales coast on most nights during the winter of 1940–41, but usually these were reconnaissances or nuisance raids. Heavier raids against Swansea began on 4/5 January 1941, when a bomb put all the Gun Operations Room (GOR) telephone lines out of action.

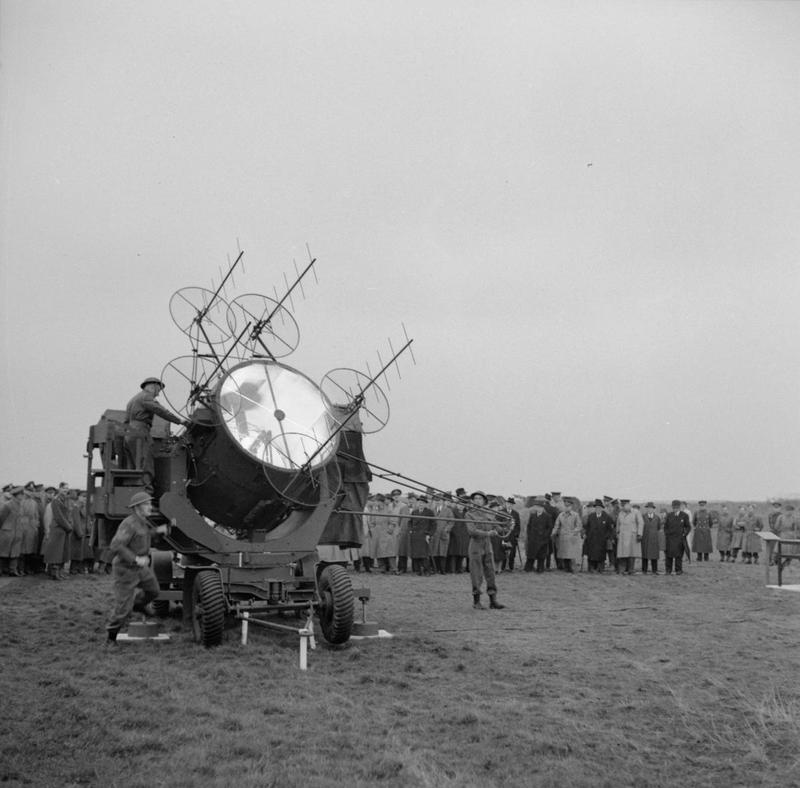
150 cm Searchlight fitted with No. 2 Mk VI SLC radar

In February 1941 the Luftwaffe began a new tactic of hitting the same towns on successive nights in an attempt to put them completely out of action. Swansea was the first town so attacked. On the night of 19/20 February the building housing the GOR was destroyed by a direct hit during a heavy raid. The Luftwaffe returned to continue the 'Swansea Blitz' on the nights of 20/21 and 21/22 February, the city centre was devastated, and fires and delayed-action bombs destroyed communications.

After a busy period for the AA defences of South Wales in early May 1941, the Blitz effectively ended in the middle of the month. Desultory raiding continued through June and July while the gaps in AA defences were filled as more equipment and units became available. With more SLC radar available, the S/Ls could now be 'declustered'. 77th S/L Regiment remained with 61 AA Bde throughout 1941. Because of growing manpower shortages during 1941, the Commander-in-Chief of AA Command, Gen Sir Frederick Pile, pioneered the employment of women of the Auxiliary Territorial Service (ATS) in AA units. On 25 October 1942 a new predominantly female searchlight regiment was formed, 93rd (Mixed) Searchlight Regiment, RA, to which 77th S/L Rgt supplied 495 Battery, which had been detached to 1 AA Division in London since the previous May. Although 495 Bty was mainly male, there was a wholescale transfer of ATS personnel in, and male gunners out after it had been transferred.

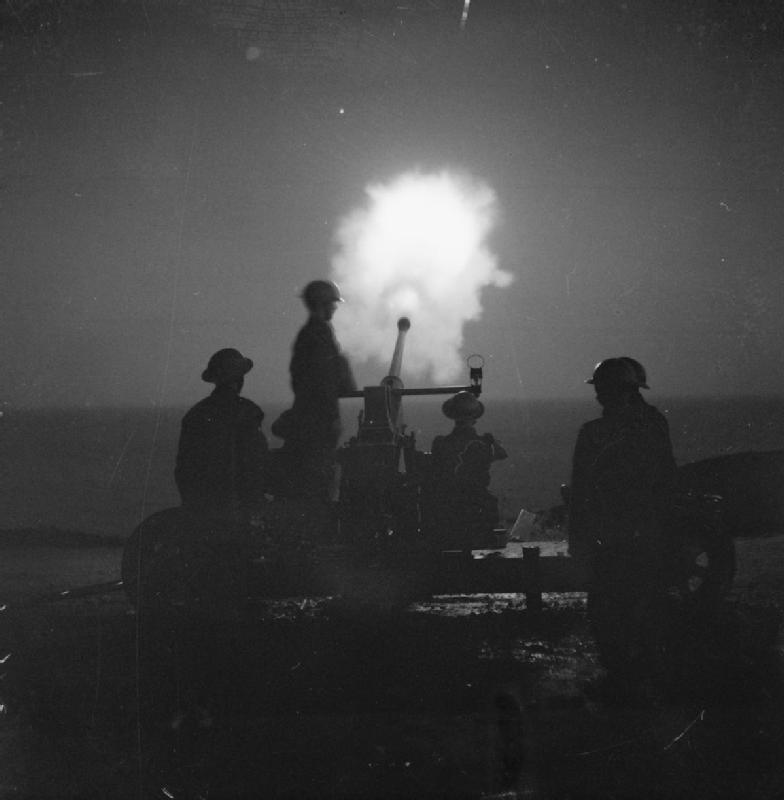
Bofors LAA gun firing at practice camp.

== 146th LAA Regiment ==
93rd (Mixed) was the last searchlight regiment to be raised during the war, and afterwards a number of existing S/L units were converted to man Light Anti-Aircraft (LAA) guns, of which there was a great shortage. 77th Searchlight Regiment converted into 146th LAA Regiment at Saighton Camp, Chester, on 22 March 1943. Its three new LAA batteries retained their existing numbers, but 496 LAA Bty joined 147th LAA Rgt at Downpatrick, County Down, on 6 April. It later rejoined 146th LAA Rgt.

Designated a 'semi-mobile' unit, the new regiment was assigned to 21st Army Group, which was being assembled for the Allied invasion of Normandy (Operation Overlord).

However, the regiment did not proceed overseas, and was disbanded on 7 June 1944.

== External sources ==
- Keith Brigstock 'Royal Artillery Searchlights', presentation to Royal Artillery Historical Society at Larkhill, 17 January 2007.
- The Royal Artillery 1939–45
