= Landguard Common =

Protected area in Suffolk, England

Coordinates: 51.938°N 1.323°E

- Site of Special Scientific Interest
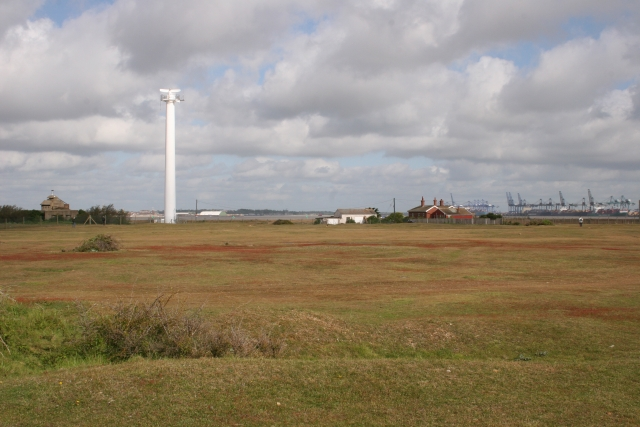
- Location of Landguard Common.
- Area of search: Suffolk
- Grid reference: TM 285 318
- Interest: Biological
- Area: 30.5 hectares
- Notification date: 1984
- Location map: Magic Map

Landguard Common is a 30.5-hectare (75-acre) biological Site of Special Scientific Interest in Felixstowe in Suffolk. An area of 16.3 hectares at the southern end is also a Local Nature Reserve.

This spit on the southern outskirts of Felixstowe has a vegetated shingle beach, which is a fragile and rare habitat. Flora include sea kale, yellow horned poppy, sea sandwort, sea campion and sea pea. Areas of saltmarsh provide cover for small birds.

There is access to the site from View Point Road.
