= Mobile Defence Corps =

British Army unit 1955–59

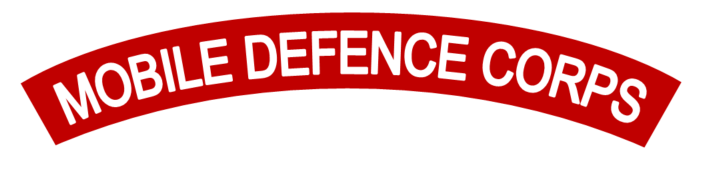
- Shoulder title insignia
- Active: 1 April 1955 – 28 February 1959
- Country: United Kingdom
- Branch: British Army
- Type: Civil defence

The Mobile Defence Corps was a British Army unit intended to assist in civil defence operations in the aftermath of a nuclear attack. It was established in 1955 from British Army and Royal Air Force personnel, with an intended strength of 48 battalions, later reduced to 36 battalions (with a total establishment of 29,500 men). Officers and non-commissioned officers were volunteers, with many coming from the army's Anti-Aircraft Command, which had disbanded in 1955. The other ranks were generally conscripts from the National Service scheme. The RAF involvement in the unit ceased in 1957. The unit reached a strength of around 14,000 men before being disbanded in 1959 in anticipation of the ending of National Service.

== Establishment ==
The Mobile Defence Corps (MDC) was intended to support civilian organisations, such as the Civil Defence Corps, and military units providing assistance to the civil authorities in a civil defence situation. The unit was to function as a link between the CDC and the regular military and provide a large body of men trained in firefighting and rescue techniques who could be used in post-nuclear attack rescue work. The MDC was a development of the Mobile Civil Defence Column, a force established by the Home Office in the early 1950s as an experiment in moving large bodies of civil defence personnel to cities in case of nuclear attack. The need for these preparations had grown since the development of more powerful thermonuclear weapons. The Mobile Defence Corps (MDC) was established as a unit of the British Army by royal warrant on 1 April 1955.

== Organisation ==
The MDC was formed of a number of battalions, assigned to the rescue or firefighting roles; each battalion also had a medical section. The personnel were classed as British Army and Royal Air Force reservists, liable to attend a one-month long initial training followed by an ongoing commitment of 15 days per year of refresher training. The organisation was under the command of Directorate of the Mobile Defence Corps. When mobilised the battalions would be assigned to the local army command and deployed in consultation with regional civil defence authorities. Trainers were a mixture of regular personnel from the army and RAF and civilian experts.

Officers and non-commissioned officers were volunteers, whereas the other ranks were generally conscripts undertaking National Service. Enough volunteers were found to form cadres of 25 battalions; most had been personnel in the army's Anti-Aircraft Command, which was disbanded in March 1955.

The original intention was for the MDC to reach a strength of 48 600-man battalions within 4 years of establishment. To meet this it was intended that the MDC training depots would process 10,000 men per year. The intended establishment was reduced to 36 750-man battalions by 1956, with an expected annual intake of 7,500 national servicemen. By 1957 the involvement of the RAF had ceased and all personnel came from the army. By the end of 1958 33 battalions had been formed. The number of personnel was 14,000 (85% of whom were conscripts) out of a maximum establishment strength of 29,500 men.

== Disbandment ==
National Service in the UK was wound down from 1957, with the last men being conscripted in 1960. The British government considered that it would not attract enough volunteers to continue the MDC in the post-conscription era and its disbandment was ordered by the Secretary of State for War, Christopher Soames. The decision was announced in December 1958 and came into effect on 28 February 1959. By the time of its disbandment the government had abandoned plans to move large numbers of civil defence personnel around the country in the aftermath of a nuclear attack. It was decided instead to provide civil defence training to artillery and infantry units of the volunteer Territorial Army (TA) reserve force, with one in four of their annual camps being devoted to civil defence exercises.

Upon disbandment of the MDC the volunteer members were directed to apply to the TA or civilian civil defence organisations if they wished to continue to serve in some capacity; some 44 MDC officers applied for transfer to the TA. The former MDC members remained liable for recall after its disbandment and in times of war would have been allocated to the TA. Investigative journalist Duncan Campbell has described the disbandment of the MDC as the first step in the dismantling of the British civil defence establishment (the Civil Defence Corps was stood down in 1968).
