= Murex (company) =

Murex Limited
- Company type: Public
- Industry: Iron
- Founded: 1909
- Defunct: 1967
- Fate: Acquired
- Successor: ESAB
- Headquarters: Rainham, Essex, England
- Products: Ferroalloys

Murex Limited was a leading British provider of services to metallurgists, smelters and refiners, and welders. It was an original constituent of the FT 30 index of leading stocks on the London Stock Exchange.

== History ==
Murex was founded in 1909 as an iron founder and a ferroalloy manufacturer. The company moved to Rainham, Essex in 1917.

In the 1930s, Murex made large quantities of electrodes at their factory in Waltham Cross, and many ships including HMS Ark Royal and Queen Elizabeth 2 have been welded using Murex equipment.

The business was sustained by a high level of activity during World War II, but after the war ended, its profits reduced substantially.

It fell out of the FT 30 index in 1967 when its share price declined, and it was replaced by Beechams.

Welding equipment made by Murex occasionally comes up for sale.

== Demise of the business ==
Murex was acquired by the BOC Group in 1967. In the UK, the rights to the Murex brand were sold to ESAB.

Murex Limited was dissolved on 11 June 2013.
