= Swansea Blitz =

WWII aerial bombardment of British city

- Part of the Strategic bombing campaign of World War II
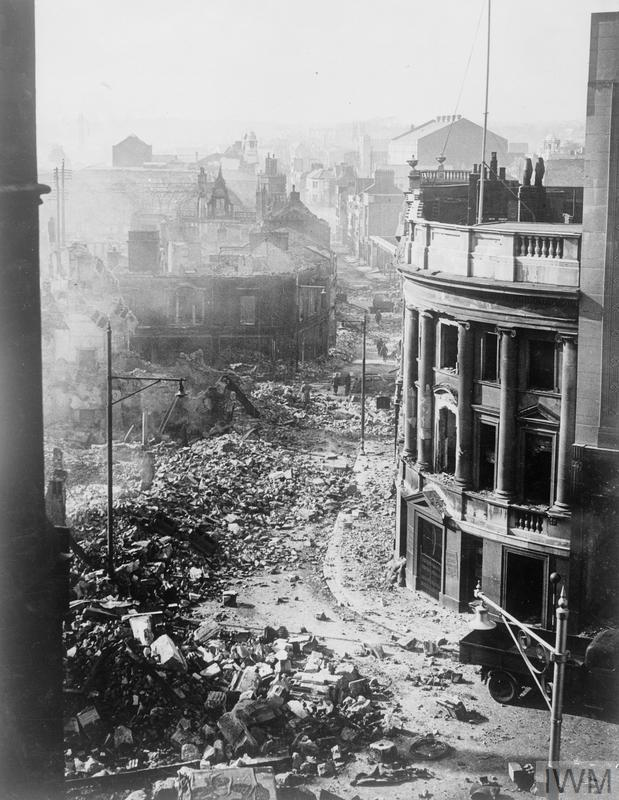
- Oxford Street, Swansea town centre, in 1941 after the Three Nights' Blitz (Photo: Imperial War Museums)
Date	1941
Location	Swansea

Belligerents
Nazi Germany	United Kingdom

Casualties and losses
Unknown	230 killed, 397 injured

The Swansea Blitz was the heavy and sustained bombing of Swansea by the German Luftwaffe during the Second World War, the most intensive episode of which was the Three Nights' Blitz from 19 to 21 February 1941, during which a total of 230 people were killed and 391 injured, 254 seriously. Swansea was selected by the Germans as a legitimate strategic target due to its importance as a port and docks and the oil refinery just beyond, and its destruction was key to Nazi German war efforts as part of their strategic bombing campaign aimed at crippling coal export and demoralizing civilians and emergency services.

== ARP planning ==
Under the provisions of the Air Raid Precautions (ARP) Act of 1937, Swansea Council was responsible for instigating civil defence measures to protect the local population. The local authority began the process of building communal air raid shelters, setting up the necessary rescue and fire services and the recruitment of air raid wardens. To complement the already-built communal shelters, the council requisitioned cellars and basements as makeshift shelters. Anderson shelters were provided for domestic premises with garden space.

Readily mobile trailer pumps were provided to complement the existing less mobile fire brigade vehicles. A fleet of canteen vans was requisitioned to provide hot drinks and food for the rescue and fire fighting teams, as well as for displaced residents.

== Bombing raids ==
=== First raid, June 1940 ===
The first air raid on Swansea commenced at 3.30 am on 27 June 1940. An initial marker flare was dropped by a Luftwaffe plane, and the following bombers dropped high explosives to the east of the city centre in the Danygraig residential area. The raid was relatively light, with no casualties reported to the ARP controllers. A number of unexploded bombs were discovered in the Kilvey Hill area. There were a further 15 raids during the year, the heaviest of which, on 1-2 September, resulted in 33 deaths and 37 serious injuries.

=== The Three Nights' Blitz ===
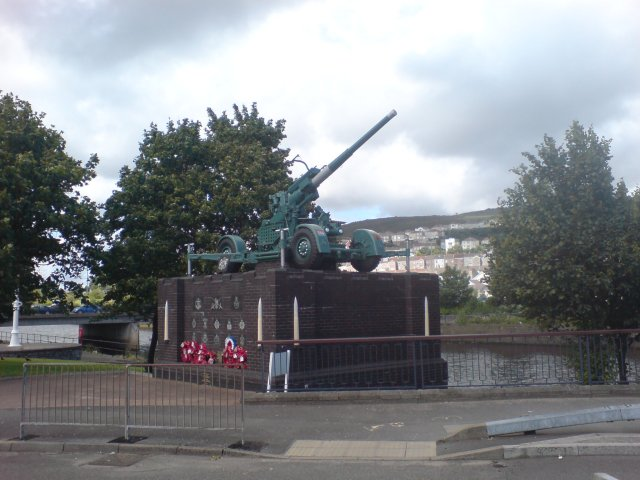
A 3.7-inch Heavy Anti-Aircraft gun surmounts the monument erected to the air defence of Swansea, particularly the night of 21 February 1941.

In January 1941, after a series of small scale raids, on 17 January there was heavy bombardment resulting in 55 deaths and 38 serious injuries. German records show the raid involved 88 enemy aircraft dropping 178 high explosive bombs. There was substantial damage to residential and commercial areas of the town. The following month the most destructive period of bombing inflicted on Swansea during the war occurred over three nights on 19, 20, and 21 February 1941 in what became known as the Three Nights' Blitz starting at 7.30 pm on 19 February.

On the first night, the building housing both the Regimental HQ of 79th (Hertfordshire Yeomanry) Heavy Anti-Aircraft Regiment, Royal Artillery and the Gun Operations Room (GOR) at Swansea was destroyed by a bomb. Two officers and five other ranks were killed or died of wounds, but the guns continued firing under local control, and communications were maintained.

The second night of bombing saw the most concentrated loss of civilian life in the Blitz on Swansea. At Teilo Crescent, in the Mayhill district of the town, 14 homes were destroyed and 24 residents as well as 6 firemen and civil defence volunteers perished. Altogether 38 people in the locality were killed during the raid. There was also extensive damage to the Mount Pleasant, Cwmbwrla and Manselton residential districts.

On the evening of 21 February, there was confusion between the Sector Operations Room at RAF Pembrey and the temporary Swansea GOR. This resulted in the guns ceasing fire between 20.20 and 21.10, and as no Night fighters arrived, the town centre was left unprotected. Although some raiders were shot down once the restriction was lifted, the centre of Swansea was devastated, and fires and delayed-action bombs destroyed communications.

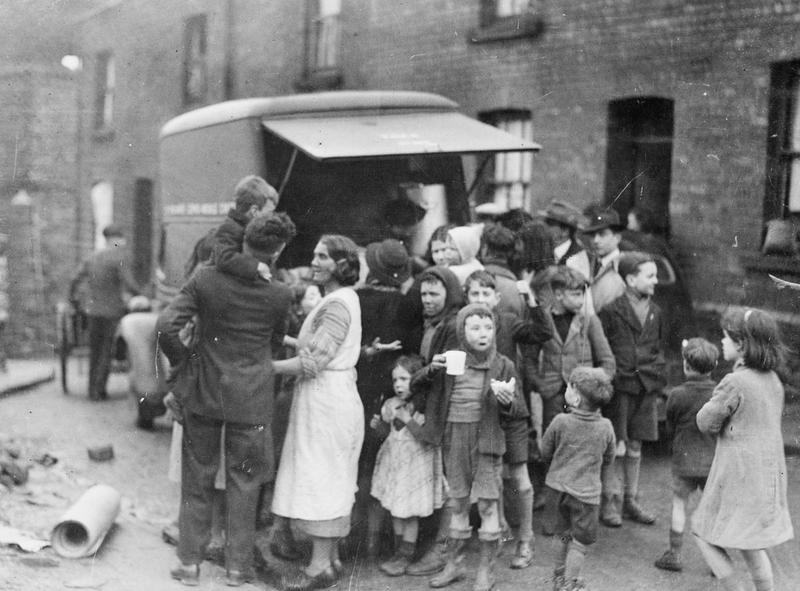
Mothers and children in a working-class area of Swansea have tea and sandwiches from a mobile canteen after a night's bombing (Photo: Imperial War Museums)

Over the three nights of the Blitz a total of nearly 14 hours of enemy activity were recorded. 1,273 high explosive bombs and 56,000 Incendiary bombs were estimated to have been dropped over an area measuring approximately 41 acres. The town centre suffered direct hits that started major conflagrations destroying many commercial premises including the Ben Evans department store and the Victorian market. The death toll after the three days of bombing stood at 230: 122 men, 68 women and 37 children. There were 254 serious injuries and 137 slight injuries reported. Altogether 282 houses were destroyed and some 7000 left homeless. 574 business premises were destroyed and 11,054 damaged. To raise morale following the Blitz, there were visits to Swansea by the King and Queen in March 1941, and the prime minister, Winston Churchill, the following month.

=== Further bombing ===
Swansea was the target for 11 more raids during 1941 and 1942. In total there were 40 bombing raids on Swansea during the war, the last of which occurred on 16 February 1943, causing 34 deaths and 111 injuries.

== Literary legacy ==
Swansea’s most famous poet, Dylan Thomas, arrived in the devastated town centre of Swansea the day after the Three Nights' Blitz to declare to his friend Bert Trick “our Swansea has died”. He would later recount his experiences in his BBC 1947 broadcast Return Journey: “The Kardomah Café was raised to the snow, the voices of the coffee drinkers - poets, painters, and musicians in their beginnings - all lost". And having explored the incinerated ruins of his old school, Swansea Grammar School on Mount Pleasant, he wrote of how "the names of the dead in the living heart and head remain for ever.” Later in the year he would compose Among those Killed in the Dawn Raid was a Man Aged a Hundred, the first of his war poems which took as their central motif civilian deaths in the bombing raids.

Thomas’s close friend and fellow poet Vernon Watkins wrote directly out of his experience of the Blitz on Swansea in poems such as The Spoils of War and The Broken Sea (Souls numbered their days/Between night and morning…).

The poet and novelist Lynette Roberts expressed the fear and horror the war brought to South Wales in poetry and prose, as in her short story Swansea Raid (“Swansea’s sure to be bad; look at those flares like a swarm of orange bees”).

== Bibliography ==
- Alban, J.R. (1994) The Three Nights’ Blitz. Swansea: Swansea City Council.
- Basil Collier, History of the Second World War, United Kingdom Military Series: The Defence of the United Kingdom, London: HM Stationery Office, 1957.
- Lewis, Bernard (2024). Swansea and the Second World War. Talybont: Y Lolfa. ISBN 9781800994409.
- Robins, Nigel (2025). Y Tân: A History of Destruction, Swansea 1941. Swansea: Nyddfwch. ISBN 9781739353346.
- Brig N.W. Routledge, History of the Royal Regiment of Artillery: Anti-Aircraft Artillery 1914–55, London: Royal Artillery Institution/Brassey's, 1994, ISBN 1-85753-099-3.
- Col J.D. Sainsbury, The Hertfordshire Yeomanry Regiments, Royal Artillery, Part 2: The Heavy Anti-Aircraft Regiment 1938–1945 and the Searchlight Battery 1937–1945, Welwyn: Hertfordshire Yeomanry and Artillery Trust/Hart Books, 2003, ISBN 0-948527-06-4.
