= 45th Anti-Aircraft Brigade =

45th Anti-Aircraft Brigade 71 Anti-Aircraft Brigade
- Active: 29 September 1938–17 November 1944; 1 January 1947 – 31 October 1955
- Country: United Kingdom
- Branch: Territorial Army
- Type: Anti-Aircraft Brigade
- Role: Air Defence
- Part of: 4 AA Division; 5 AA Division; 9 AA Division; 3 AA Group; 4 AA Group; 2 AA Group
- Garrison/HQ: Cardiff
- Engagements: Cardiff Blitz

45th Anti-Aircraft Brigade (45 AA Bde) was an air defence formation of Britain's Territorial Army (TA). Formed in 1938, it was responsible for protecting South Wales during the Second World War. It was reformed in the postwar TA under a new title, and continued until 1955.

== Origin ==
With the expansion of Britain's Anti-Aircraft (AA) defences in the late 1930s, new formations were created to command the growing number of Royal Artillery (RA) and Royal Engineers (RE) AA gun and searchlight units. 45th AA Brigade was formed on 29 September 1938 at Newport, Wales, to take over the TA AA units in South Wales. The HQ later moved to Penylan Court, Cardiff, the pre-war HQ of 20th Light Anti-Aircraft Regiment, Royal Artillery. The brigade was responsible for the AA defences of South Wales, and initially formed part of 4 Anti-Aircraft Division. The first brigade commander was Brigadier Charles Massy, DSO, MC.

== Mobilisation ==
At the time the brigade was formed, the TA's AA units were in a state of mobilisation because of the Munich crisis, although they were soon stood down. In February 1939 the TA's AA defences came under the control of a new Anti-Aircraft Command. In June, during the period of tension leading up to the outbreak of the Second World War, a partial mobilisation of AA Command was begun in a process known as 'couverture', whereby each unit did a month's tour of duty in rotation to man selected AA gun and searchlight positions. AA Command mobilised fully on 24 August, ahead of the official declaration of war on 3 September.

=== Order of Battle 1939 ===
On the outbreak of war 45 AA Bde was supposed to have come under the command of 5 AA Division, but this process was not completed until 1 May 1940. In September 1939 it had the following composition:

- 77th (Welsh) Anti-Aircraft Regiment, RA – Heavy AA (HAA) gun unit converted from field artillery
  - HQ, 239th and 240th (Glamorgan) Batteries at Cardiff
  - 241st and 242nd (Glamorgan) Batteries at Rhondda
- 6th (Glamorgan) Battalion, Welch Regiment (67th Searchlight Regiment) – Searchlight (S/L) unit converted from infantry
  - HQ, 450th–452nd S/L Companies at Cardiff
- 1st (Rifle) Battalion, Monmouthshire Regiment (68th Searchlight Regiment) – S/L unit converted from infantry
  - HQ, 453rd–455th S/L Companies at Stow Hill, Newport
- No 2 (AA S/L) Company, Carmarthenshire Fortress Royal Engineers, at Llanelli – later 484 S/L Battery, RA
- 45th Anti-Aircraft Brigade Company, Royal Army Service Corps (RASC) – later 914 Company RASC
- Glamorgan Company, Auxiliary Territorial Service (ATS)

In addition, 20th Light AA Regiment was at Cardiff under the command of the Welsh area of Western Command and 34th LAA Regiment was forming in Swansea under the command of 55 Light AA Bde at Plymouth. These soon came under the command of 45 AA Bde.

In mid-May, as the Battle of France got under way, 45 AA Bde's units – particularly the widely spaced S/L sites – were ordered to find rifle detachments to guard against possible attacks by German paratroopers. The brigade also had to lend 240 AA Bty of 77th AA Rgt, with a Gun-laying radar (GL) set, to reinforce the defences of Littlehampton on the South Coast of England, and 160 Troop of 20th LAA Rgt with its AA Light machine guns (LMGs) to Portsmouth.

== Battle of Britain ==
After the British Expeditionary Force was evacuated from Dunkirk, the German Luftwaffe began almost nightly minor air raids, often by single aircraft, against the dock facilities and steelworks of South Wales, though the Battle of Britain was mainly fought over Southern England.

In July 1940, the Cardiff area was protected by a mere 12 HAA guns, but during the summer the AA defences of South Wales were bolstered by a number of units that had been re-equipped after evacuation from Dunkirk and Norway. These included 5 AA Bde, which was reformed to take over the Gloucester–Hereford area, 55th (Devon) LAA Rgt, a mobile unit returned from Norway, and 79th (Hertfordshire Yeomanry) AA Rgt and 85th (Tees) AA Rgt from Dunkirk. The arrival in September of the Regular Army 1st S/L Rgt, RA, also re-equipped after Dunkirk, allowed 45 AA Bde to complete the illuminated areas of South Wales, and 484 (Carmarthenshire) S/L Bty was relieved and sent to Devonport.

In June all AA regiments equipped with 3-inch or the newer 3.7-inch guns were termed Heavy Anti-Aircraft (HAA) to distinguish them from the new Light Anti-Aircraft (LAA) units being formed. On 1 August all RE and converted infantry S/L regiments were transferred to the RA.

=== Dispositions, August 1940 ===
In August and September 1940, the Cardiff area had 26 HAA guns. The available LAA units were distributed to defend Vulnerable Points (VPs) such as docks and Glascoed Royal Ordnance Factory. The number of raids over South Wales, and the number of times the guns engaged, increased sharply at the end of August. At this time, 45 AA Bde was deployed as follows:

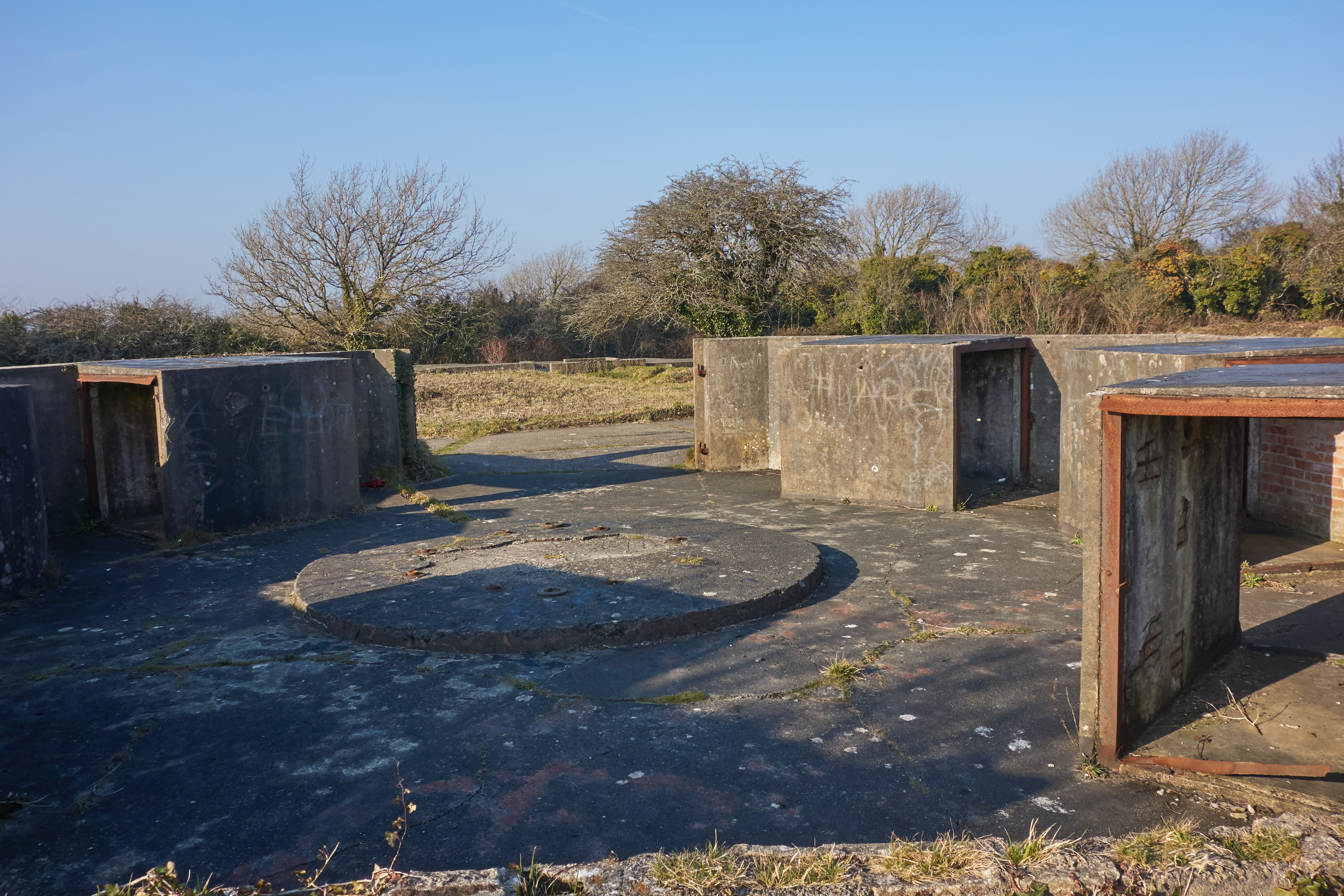
3.7-inch gun emplacements at Lavernock Battery

- 77th (Welsh) HAA Rgt
  - 239 HAA Bty
    - The Bulwarks, Porthkerry – 4 x 3.7-inch
    - Sully – 4 x 3.7-inch
  - 240 HAA Bty
    - Llwyn-y-Grant, Cardiff – 2 x 3-inch
    - New House, Newport – 2 x 3-inch, 2 x 3.7-inch
  - 241 HAA Bty – detached to 4 AA Division
  - 242 HAA Bty
    - Ely Racecourse, Cardiff – 4 x 3.7-inch
    - Intake, West Llandaff – 2 x 3.7-inch
- 79th (Hertfordshire Yeomanry) HAA Rgt
  - 246 HAA Bty
    - Bateman's Hill, Upton Castle, Pembrokeshire – 4 x 3.7-inch
    - West Penner, Pembroke – 4 x 3.7-inch
  - 247 HAA Bty
    - Jersey Marine Golf Club, Swansea – 8 x 3.7-inch
  - 248 HAA Bty
    - Lavernock Fort, Penarth – 2 x mobile 3.7-inch with GL
    - Mardy Farm, Cardiff – 4 x mobile 3-inch, 4 x static 3.7-inch
- 85th (Tees) HAA Rgt
  - 174 HAA Bty
    - RAF Pembrey – 4 x 3.7-inch
    - Sketty, Swansea – 4 x 3.7-inch
- 88th HAA Rgt
  - 283 HAA Bty
    - Pye Corner, Nash, Newport – 8 x 3.7-inch
- 20th LAA Rgt
  - 62 LAA Bty
    - Glascoed – 10 Lewis AA LMGs
  - 63 AA Bty
    - Pontypridd – 6 Lewis guns
    - RAF St Athan – 4 x Vickers Mk VIII 2-pounder pom-pom gun
  - 94 LAA Bty
    - Newport Docks – 24 x Lewis guns, 2 x 3-inch
- 34th LAA Rgt
  - 64 LAA Bty
    - Swansea – 16 x Lewis guns
    - RAF Pembrey – 2 x Bofors 40 mm guns, 12 x Lewis guns
  - 65 LAA Bty
    - Llandarcy – 2 x 3-inch Naval guns, 12 x Lewis guns
    - Clydach, Swansea – 8 x Lewis guns
  - 92 LAA Bty
    - Bridgend 16 x Lewis guns
    - RAF Llandow – 14 x Lewis guns
    - Port Talbot – 8 x Lewis guns
- 67th (Welch) S/L Rgt
  - 450 S/L Bty, HQ at Castleton, Newport – 24 x S/Ls
  - 451 S/L Bty, HQ at Usk – 18 x S/Ls
  - 452 S/L Bty, HQ at Bridgend – 16 x S/Ls
- 77th S/L Rgt – forming at Picton Castle, Haverfordwest
- 484 (Carmarthenshire) Independent S/L Bty, HQ at Swansea – 15 x S/Ls

There were frequent moves of sub-units as reinforcements were integrated into the defences, and as opportunities arose for training. During this period, 45 AA Bde was commanded by Brig Cuthbert Baynham, DSO.

== Blitz ==
Following the Luftwaffe's defeat in the Battle of Britain, it began heavy night attacks on Britain's cities ('The Blitz'). At first the towns of South Wales, including important coal and oil port facilities, refineries, steelworks and ordnance factories, were under almost nightly air attack, to which the AA defences replied as best they could. In the absence of effective GL radar control, at night the guns could only reply blindly with fixed barrages. In September, 45 AA Brigade was also called upon to lend reinforcements (174 HAA Bty) to London. There was a lull in the intensity of raids on South Wales from late September as the Luftwaffe concentrated on London and the industrial cities of the English Midlands, but there was a flare-up in activity over South Wales in late October. Some of this was aircraft dropping Parachute mines in the Bristol Channel. In November the AA guns began to claim some hits from GL-controlled fire.

As AA Command's resources expanded, 5 AA Division's responsibilities were split in November 1940 and a new 9 AA Division was created to cover South Wales and the Severn Valley. 45 AA Brigade was transferred to the new formation, and was itself split in half, a new 61 AA Bde taking over the western part of its area around the Swansea Gun Defence Area (GDA) and out to Pembroke Dock, while 45 AA Bde concentrated round the Cardiff GDA (covering Barry and Newport as well as Cardiff); the S/L detachments were widely spread across brigade boundaries. For example, 37th (Tyne Electrical Engineers) S/L Rgt of 5 AA Bde had 307 Bty at Llandaff operating the 'Cardiff–Newport Dazzle Area' for 45 AA Bde. However, both splits (to form 9 AA Division and 61 AA Bde) did not take full effect until 3 February 1941.

There were heavy night raids on Cardiff on 2 January, 3 and 4 March 1941 (the Cardiff Blitz), with frequent smaller raids. By the end of February 1941 the HAA guns (3-inch, 3.7-inch and 4.5-inch) in the Cardiff GDA only numbered 52 out of a planned establishment of 64. This increased a month later to 56 guns, though further additions to the establishment were already being called for. The position on LAA gun sites was worse: only small numbers of Bofors guns were available at the start of the Blitz, and most LAA detachments had to make do with AA LMGs. However, they began to be supplemented by AA rocket batteries (Z Batteries). Four of these (initially 111, 113, 124 and 125) were assigned to 45 AA Bde from early September 1940, and a regimental HQ was established soon afterward to command them.

=== Order of Battle 1940–41 ===
Formation sign of 9 AA Division.

The composition of 45 AA Bde during this period was as follows:

- 77th (Welsh) HAA Rgt
  - 239, 240, 241 HAA Btys
  - 242 HAA Bty – disbanded June 1941
- 85th (Tees) HAA Rgt (part) – returned from Dunkirk
  - 174, 220 HAA Btys
- 88th HAA Rgt (part) – new unit formed in London; to 1 AA Division by May 1941
  - 281, 282, 283 HAA Btys
- 112th HAA Rgt – from 8 AA Division July 1941
  - 351, 352, 353 Btys
- 118th HAA Rgt – new unit formed December 1940
  - 373, 374, 375 HAA Btys
- 20th LAA Rgt
  - 62, 63 LAA Btys
  - 94 LAA Bty – attached to 5 AA Division until March 1941; to 77th LAA Rgt summer 1941
  - 240 LAA Bty – joined summer 1941
- 34th LAA Rgt (part) – to 61 AA Bde by May 1941
  - 64, 65, 92 LAA Btys
  - 93 LAA Bty – to 7 AA Division August 1940
- 55th (Devon) LAA Rgt – mobile unit returned from Norway, part of GHQ Reserve lent to AA Command
  - 163 LAA Bty
  - 164 LAA Bty – attached to 5 AA Bde, then 1 AA Division
  - 165 LAA Bty – attached to 61 AA Bde
  - 55 LAA Rgt Signal Section, Royal Corps of Signals (RCS)
- 1st S/L Rgt (part) – Regular Army S/L unit returned from Dunkirk
  - 2 S/L Bty
- 37th (TEE) S/L Rgt (part) – returned from Dunkirk
  - 307 S/L Bty
- 67th (Welch) S/L Rgt
  - 450, 451, 452 S/L Btys
- 8 AA 'Z' Rgt
  - 113, 130 Z Btys – attached to 61 AA Bde until summer 1941
  - 125, 140 Z Btys – attached to 5 AA Bde until summer 1941
- 12 AA 'Z' Rgt – joined June 1941
  - 101 Z Bty – disbanded summer 1941
  - 111, 124 Z Btys

== Mid-War ==
After a busy period for the AA defences of South Wales in early May 1941, the Blitz effectively ended in the middle of the month. Desultory raiding continued through June and July while the gaps in AA defences were filled as more equipment and units became available. Searchlights, now assisted by Searchlight Control (SLC) radar, were reorganised, with a 'Killer Belt' established between the Cardiff and Bristol (8 AA Division) GDAs to cooperate closely with RAF night fighters. Obsolete equipment such as 3-inch guns and Vickers pom-poms were gradually replaced by 3.7-inch and Bofors guns, and GL Mark II radar became available. The HAA and support units increasingly became 'Mixed', indicating that women of the Auxiliary Territorial Service (ATS) were fully integrated into them. Some LAA units and many 'Z' batteries also incorporated part-time members of the Home Guard. At the same time, experienced units were posted away to train for service overseas (sometimes being lent back to AA Command while awaiting embarkation). This led to a continual turnover of units, which accelerated in 1942 with the preparations for the invasion of North Africa (Operation Torch) and the need to transfer AA units to counter the Luftwaffe's Baedeker Blitz against largely unprotected inland cities and then the hit-and-run daylight attacks against South Coast towns. South Wales did occasionally receive a raid, as at Cardiff in May 1943.

In October 1942 AA Command abolished its hierarchy of divisions and corps, and established a single tier of AA Groups corresponding to the Groups of RAF Fighter Command. 45 AA Brigade came under 3 AA Group covering South Wales and South West England and affiliated to No. 10 Group RAF.

=== Order of Battle 1941–44 ===
During this period the brigade was composed as follows:

- 77th (Welsh) HAA Rgt – embarked December 1941, captured in Java March 1942
  - 239, 240, 241 HAA Btys
- 79th (Hertfordshire Yeomanry) HAA Rgt – returned from mobile training August 1942; mobilised and left AA Command October 1942; later to Operation Torch
  - 246, 247, 398 HAA Btys
  - 79 HAA Rgt Signal Section
  - 79 HAA Rgt Workshop, Royal Electrical and Mechanical Engineers
- 112th HAA Rgt – to 61 AA Bde May 1942
  - 351, 353 HAA Btys
  - 352 HAA Bty – attached to 5 AA Bde March 1942
  - 380 HAA Bty – from 109th HAA Rgt
- 118th HAA Rgt – unbrigaded April 1943; later semi-mobile unit with 21st Army Group
  - 373, 374 HAA Btys
  - 375 HAA Bty –attached to 61 AA Bde August; attached to 67 AA Bde October 1942
  - 275 HAA Bty – from 86th (Honourable Artillery Company) HAA Rgt; to 165th HAA Rgt July 1942
  - 399 HAA Bty – from 98th HAA Rgt July; attached to 61 AA Bde August 1942

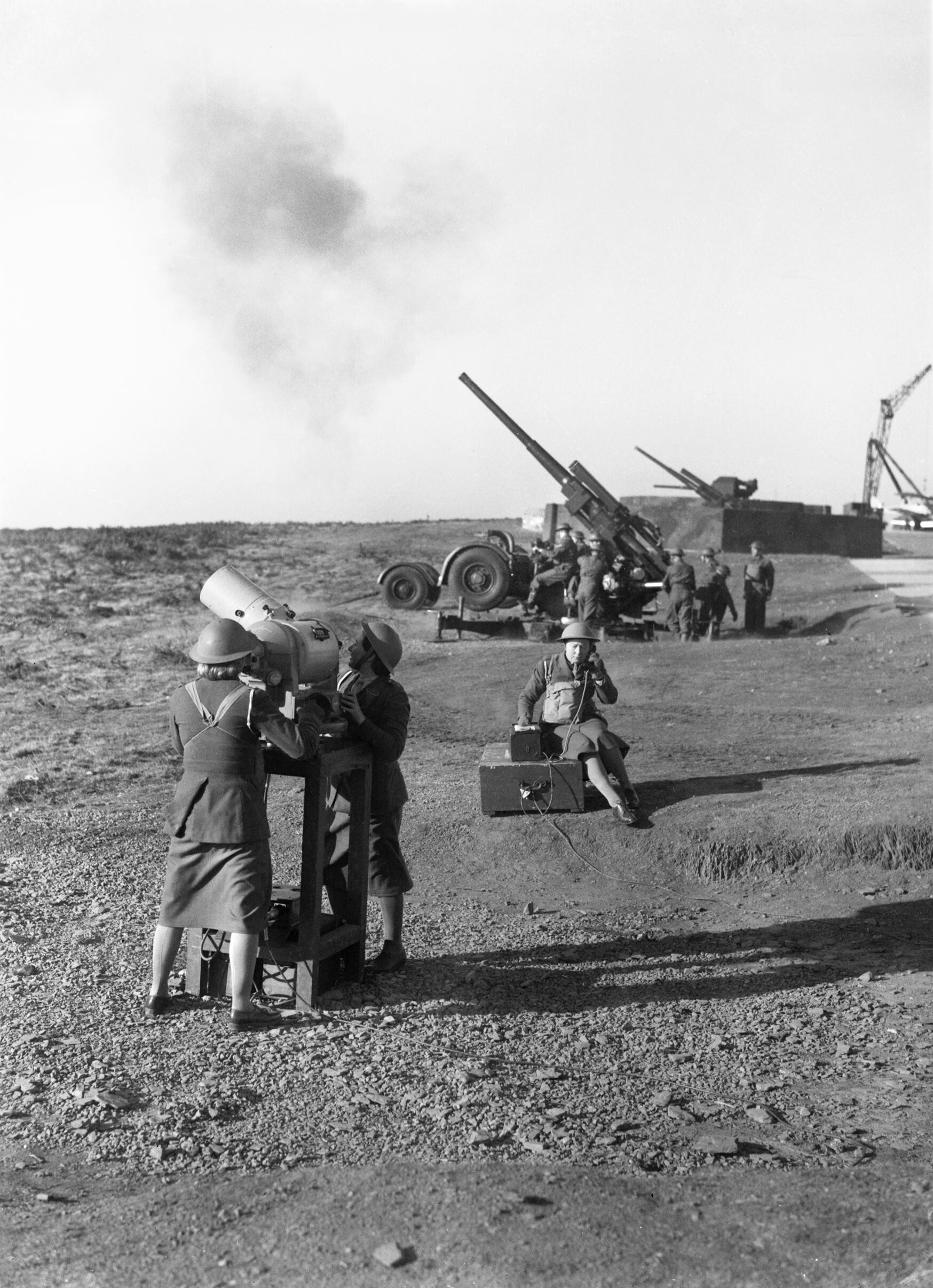
ATS women operating instruments on an HAA gun site.

- 166th (Mixed) HAA Rgt – from 55 AA Bde by August 1943
  - 549, 555, 580 (M) HAA Btys
- 171st (Mixed) HAA Rgt – formed August 1942
  - 474, 496, 569 (M) HAA Btys
  - 580 (M) HAA Bty –to 166th (M) HAA Rgt by August 1943
- 181st (Mixed) HAA Rgt – formed October 1942
  - 587, 612, 621 (M) HAA Btys
  - 668 (M) HAA Bty – joined April 1943; attached 61 AA Bde; to 172nd (M) HAA Rgt May 1943
- 20th LAA Rgt – began mobilisation as a Defended Ports unit August 1941; to 3 AA Division December 1941
  - 62, 63, 244 LAA Btys
- 44th LAA Rgt – from 8 AA Division Autumn 1941; unbrigaded by end 1941; to India 1942
  - 75 LAA Bty
  - 91 LAA Bty – attached to 5 AA Bde
  - 239 LAA Bty – attached to 61 AA Bde
- 50th LAA Rgt – joined by early November 1942; to 63 AA Bde before end of year
  - 58 LAA Bty – attached to 67 AA Bde
  - 93, 245 LAA Btys
- 55th (Devon) LAA Rgt – embarked November 1941, to Ceylon 1942
  - 163, 164, 165 LAA Btys
- 72nd LAA Rgt – from 3 AA Division before May 1942; to 8 AA Division May 1942
  - 212 LAA Bty
  - 213 LAA Bty – attached to 5 AA Bde
  - 217 LAA Bty – attached to 61 Aa Bde
  - 465 LAA Bty – joined February 1942
- 97th LAA Rgt – from 2 AA Gp December 1943
  - 221, 232, 301, 480 LAA Btys
- 112th (Durham Light Infantry) LAA Rgt – from 61 AA Bde Summer 1942; later to India
  - 364 LAA Bty – attached to 67 AA Bde October 1942
  - 365, 366 LAA Btys

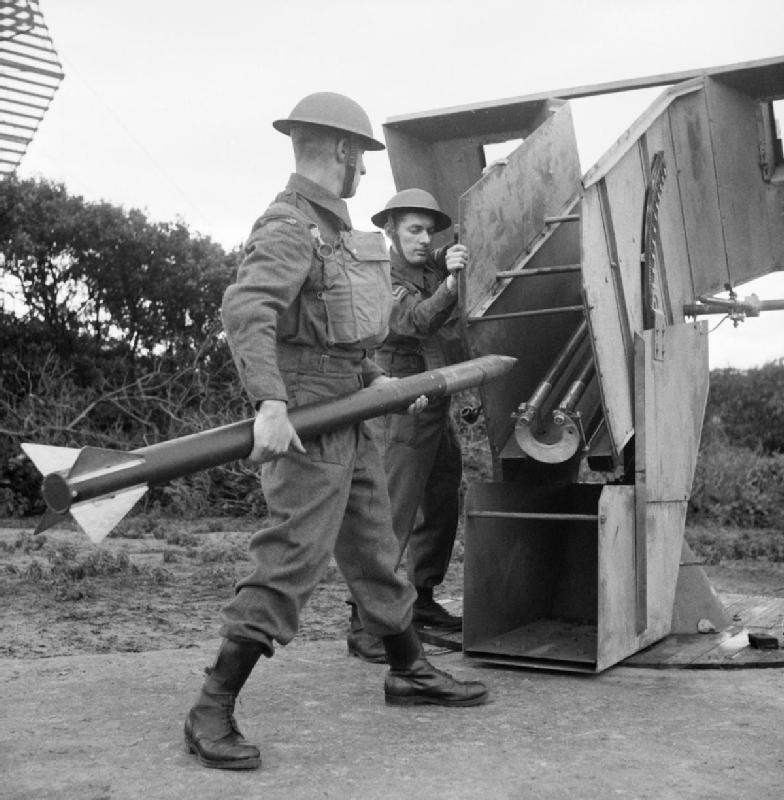
Home Guard volunteers load a single launcher on a static 'Z' Battery, July 1942.

- 37th (Tyne Electrical Engineers) S/L Rgt – from 67 AA Bde August 1942
  - 307, 308, 348 S/L Btys
  - 349 S/L Bty – attached to 69 AA Bde
- 67th (Welch) S/L Rgt – to 4 AA Gp by March 1943
  - 450 S/L Bty
  - 451, 452 S/L Btys – attached to 11 AA Division October 1942
- 8th AA 'Z' Rgt – to 61 AA Bde Autumn 1941; returned August 1942
  - 113 Z Bty – 'attached to 61 AA Bde
  - 125, 130, 140, 186, 222 Z Btys
- 12th AA 'Z' Rgt – from 8 AA Division June 1941; to 6 AA Division Autumn 1941
- 411 Gun Operations Room (GOR) – Cardiff
- 45 AA Brigade Signal Office Mixed Sub-Section – part of No 1 Company, 9 AA Division Mixed Signal Unit, RCS; later part of 3 Mixed Signal Company, 3 AA Group Mixed Signals
  - 411 GOR Mixed Signal Section

== Operations Overlord and Diver ==
In March 1944 AA Command undertook a major reorganisation in order to defend the assembly camps, depots and embarkation ports for the planned Invasion of Normandy (Operation Overlord) and to prepare for the expected onslaught of V-1 flying bombs (codenamed 'Divers') against London. As a result of these changes, 45 AA Bde came under the command of 4 AA Gp, which previously had only controlled North Wales and North West England.

=== Order of Battle March–December 1944 ===
During this period 45 AA Bde's composition was as follows:

- 166th (M) HAA Rgt – to 61 AA Bde August 1944
  - 549, 555, 580 (M) HAA Btys
- 171st (M) HAA Rgt
  - 474, 496, 569 (M) HAA Btys
- 181st (M) HAA Rgt
  - 587, 612, 621 (M) HAA Btys
- 37th (TEE) S/L Rgt – to 2 AA Gp March 1944
  - 307, 308, 348 S/L Btys
- 8th (M) AA 'Z' Rgt – became 8 AA Area Mixed Rgt April 1944
  - 113, 130 (M) Z Btys – to 61 AA Bde April 1944
  - 125, 140, 186, 222 (M) Z Btys
- 914 (M) AA Transport Co, RASC

By October 1944, the brigade's HQ establishment was 8 officers, 7 male other ranks and 22 members of the ATS, together with a small number of attached drivers, cooks and mess orderlies (male and female). In addition, the brigade had a Mixed Signal Office Section of 1 officer, 5 male other ranks and 19 ATS, which was formally part of the Group signal unit.

In the autumn of 1944, the requirements of the anti-'Diver' defences of South East England meant that AA Command progressively stripped units from the West and North West. At the same time the Luftwaffe was suffering from such shortages of pilots, aircraft and fuel that serious air attacks on the rest of the UK could be discounted. On 17 November 1944 45 AA Bde was disbanded and the last of its units were posted away.

== Postwar ==
When the TA was reconstituted in 1947, 45 AA Bde was reformed at Cardiff as 71 AA Brigade (TA), taking the number of a wartime formation that had been disbanded. Forming part of 2 AA Group, it had the following composition:

- 282 HAA Rgt – formerly 77th HAA Rgt as above
- 602 Rgt HAA Rgt – formerly 608 (Welch) Rgt RA, previously 67th S/L Rgt as above
- 603 (Mixed) HAA Rgt– formerly 609 (Monmouthshire) Rgt RA, previously 68 S/L Rgt as above
- 520 LAA Rgt– formerly 20th LAA Rgt as above
- 534 LAA Rgt– formerly 34th LAA Rgt as above

AA Command was disbanded in March 1955, and 71 AA Bde was placed in 'suspended animation' from 31 October that year. It was formally disbanded on 31 December 1957.

== External sources ==
- British Army units from 1945 on
- Generals of World War II
- Orders of Battle at Patriot Files
- Royal Artillery 1939–1945
- Graham Watson, The Territorial Army 1947
