= 2nd Welsh Brigade, Royal Field Artillery =

2nd Welsh Brigade, Royal Field Artillery 77th (Welsh) Heavy Anti-Aircraft Regiment, Royal Artillery 282nd (Glamorgan and Monmouthshire) Field Regiment, Royal Artillery 211 (South Wales) Battery, Royal Artillery
- Cap Badge of the Royal Artillery (pre-1953)
- Active: 1908–present
- Country: United Kingdom
- Branch: Territorial Force/Territorial Army
- Role: Field Artillery; Air Defence Artillery; Close Support Artillery
- Garrison/HQ: Cardiff; Raglan Barracks, Newport
- Engagements: Sinai and Palestine Campaign; Cardiff Blitz; Battle of Java (1942)

The 2nd Welsh Brigade was a Royal Field Artillery unit of Britain's Territorial Force (TF) formed in 1908 that served in Palestine during World War I. Between the wars, it was converted to the anti-aircraft (AA) role. It was captured in Java during World War II. Its successor unit continues in Britain's Army Reserve today.

== Origin ==
The creation of the Territorial Force under the Haldane Reforms of 1908 saw a widespread reorganisation of existing Volunteer Force units. One new unit formed was the II (or 2nd) Welsh Brigade, Royal Field Artillery. (Note: Initially the unit was going to be the 1st (I) Brigade, with 1st and 2nd Glamorgan batteries and 1st Welsh Ammunition Column, but the numbering was altered by 1910.) The bulk of the personnel came from the 2nd Volunteer Battalion Welsh Regiment based in Cardiff, originally raised as Rifle Volunteers in 1859, some of whom had seen active service during the Second Boer War. (Other members of this battalion joined the Glamorganshire Royal Horse Artillery, and the remainder formed the 7th (Cyclist) Battalion, Welsh Regiment.) One battery of the new field artillery brigade was provided by the 1st Cardigan Royal Garrison Artillery (Volunteers), which had been formed at Aberystwyth, Cardiganshire, on 28 June 1901 as the Volunteers expanded during the Boer War. This had consisted of two 'position batteries' (later 'heavy batteries'). The new brigade had the following organisation: (Note: One normally reliable source states that the 2nd Glamorganshire Artillery Volunteers formed part of 2nd Welsh Bde; this is contradicted by the official notice in the London Gazette, and by other sources. The 2nd Glamorganshire AV actually formed the Glamorgan RGA (TF).)

- Headquarters (HQ) at Drill Hall, Cardiff
- 3rd Glamorganshire Battery at Drill Hall, Cardiff
- 4th Glamorganshire Battery at Drill Hall, Cardiff
- Cardiganshire Battery at Glyndwr Road, Aberystwyth
- 2nd Welsh Ammunition Column at Drill Hall, Cardiff

The unit was part of the TF's Welsh Division. The batteries were each issued with four 15-pounder guns.

Joshua Pritchard Hughes, Bishop of Llandaff, was appointed chaplain to the new brigade, with the rank of chaplain 1st class (TF). As a young clergyman he had been appointed chaplain to the 2nd Volunteer Battalion on 10 December 1876 and maintained the link as he rose in the church.

== World War I ==
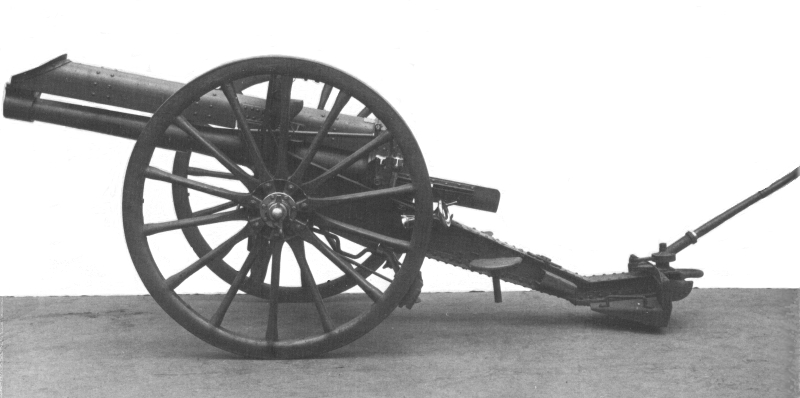
15-pounder gun, issued to the Territorial Force

=== Mobilisation ===
After the order to mobilise was received on 4 August 1914, the units of the Welsh Division assembled at their drill halls. The 2nd Welsh Brigade mobilised at Cardiff under the command of Lt-Col H.T. Gilling, TD, who had been CO since 1913.

By 11 August, the units had completed their concentration and TF members were invited to volunteer for Overseas Service. Four days later, the War Office issued instructions to separate those men who had signed up for Home Service only, and form these into reserve units, and on 31 August, the formation of a reserve or 2nd Line unit was authorised for each 1st Line unit where 60 per cent or more of the men had volunteered for Overseas Service. The titles of these 2nd Line units would be the same as the original, but distinguished by a '2/' prefix. In this way duplicate batteries, brigades and divisions were created, mirroring those TF formations being sent overseas.

=== 1/II Welsh Brigade, RFA ===
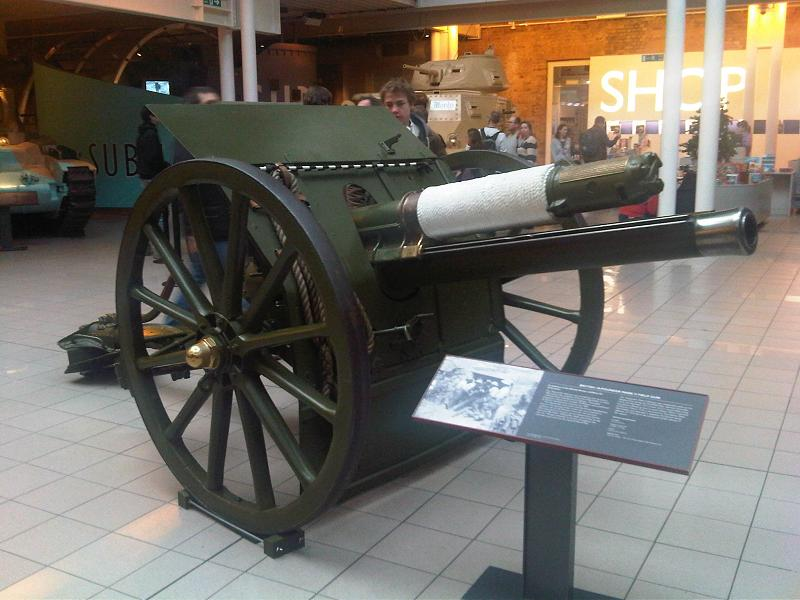
18-pounder preserved at the Imperial War Museum

At the end of August, the Welsh Division concentrated at Northampton to continue its training. On 18 November, the division was warned for garrison duty in India, but this was cancelled and in December it moved to Cambridge, then to Bedford in May 1915. In July, the infantry of the division (now renamed the 53rd (Welsh) Division) embarked for service at Gallipoli, but the divisional artillery remained at Bedford. In October, the batteries were re-armed with modern 18-pounder guns and on 8 November they handed over their obsolescent 15-pounders to the 2nd Line unit, which had just arrived at Bedford.

53rd (Welsh) Divisional Artillery was now ordered to France to join the British Expeditionary Force (BEF) on the Western Front. It embarked on 20 November and had concentrated at Pont-Remy by 25 November, from where parties were sent to various divisional artilleries for instruction in front line duties.

Meanwhile, after suffering appalling casualties at Gallipoli, 53rd (Welsh) Division had been withdrawn to Egypt to refit. On 30 January 1916, the divisional artillery was ordered to rejoin the rest of the division. The batteries entrained at Pont-Remy, embarked at Marseille on 3 February and disembarked at Alexandria on 11 February. By 22 February the artillery had rejoined the division at Beni Salama. For the rest of the year, the recuperating division was stationed in the Suez Canal defences.

In May 1916, the TF field brigades were numbered, the 1/II Welsh being designated CCLXVI Brigade, RFA, (266 Brigade) and the batteries became A, B and C. Then, on 25 December 1916, the divisional artillery was reorganised: A Bty of CCLXVI Bde was broken up between B and C Btys (to make them up to six guns each) and they were redesignated A and B, while the brigade was redesignated CCLXVII Brigade, RFA (267 Bde). 53rd (W) Divisional Ammunition Column had remained in France, and was reformed in Egypt by abolishing the Brigade Ammunition Columns.

==== Palestine ====
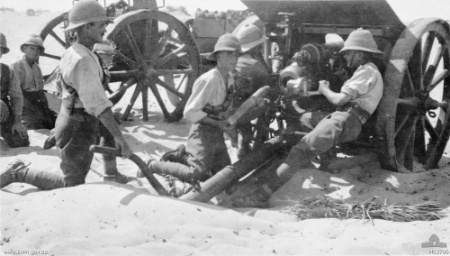
18-pounder gun in Sinai

Early in 1917, the Egyptian Expeditionary Force launched the Sinai and Palestine Campaign by crossing the Sinai desert and advancing against Turkish forces at Gaza City, but CCLXVII Bde remained in the Suez Canal defences and missed the First Battle of Gaza. The brigade rejoined the division on 19 April while the Second Battle of Gaza was in progress but, although it crossed Wadi Ghuzzeh and took up position, it did not fire a shot in the action. Infantry casualties had been high and gains minimal, and the EEF dug in for a summer of trench warfare. Although the War Office was unable to provide more divisions for the EEF, it could send guns: 53rd (W) Division's batteries were temporarily brought up to a strength of eight rather than six guns, until further troops arrived.

The reorganised EEF renewed its offensive (the Third Battle of Gaza) on 27 October. XX Corps, including 53rd (W) Divisional artillery, moved into position during the night of 30/31 October to capture Beersheba, and the bombardment began at 05.55. After a pause at 07.00 to let the dust settle and determine the effect, the gunfire resumed. Infantry parties advanced to within 30 yards (27 m) of the barrage to finish cutting the barbed wire. They then rushed Point 1069 and the 18-pounder batteries began to move up to more advanced positions. Beersheba had fallen to the Desert Mounted Corps and XX Corps could bivouack on the objective. On 3 November 53rd (W) Division was ordered to advance to the Tel es Sheria road. The right column consisted of 160th (South Wales) Brigade but only one battery of CCLXVII Bde because of the shortage of water for the horses. It was a difficult march over broken country in hot weather and the gunners had to haul their guns up to the head of the valley to get in range of the Khuweilfe heights. 160th Brigade met determined opposition and could not clear the wells at Khuweilfe before nightfall. The attack was renewed at 05.00 next morning, but the artillery support ceased when the ammunition wagons could not get up to the guns, and the infantry only got as far as Hill 1706. However, on 6 November the division assaulted the Khuweilfe position supported by an intense bombardment by all its own guns and a heavy battery. After confused fighting, the position was held, with the support of the divisional artillery breaking up Turkish counter-attacks.

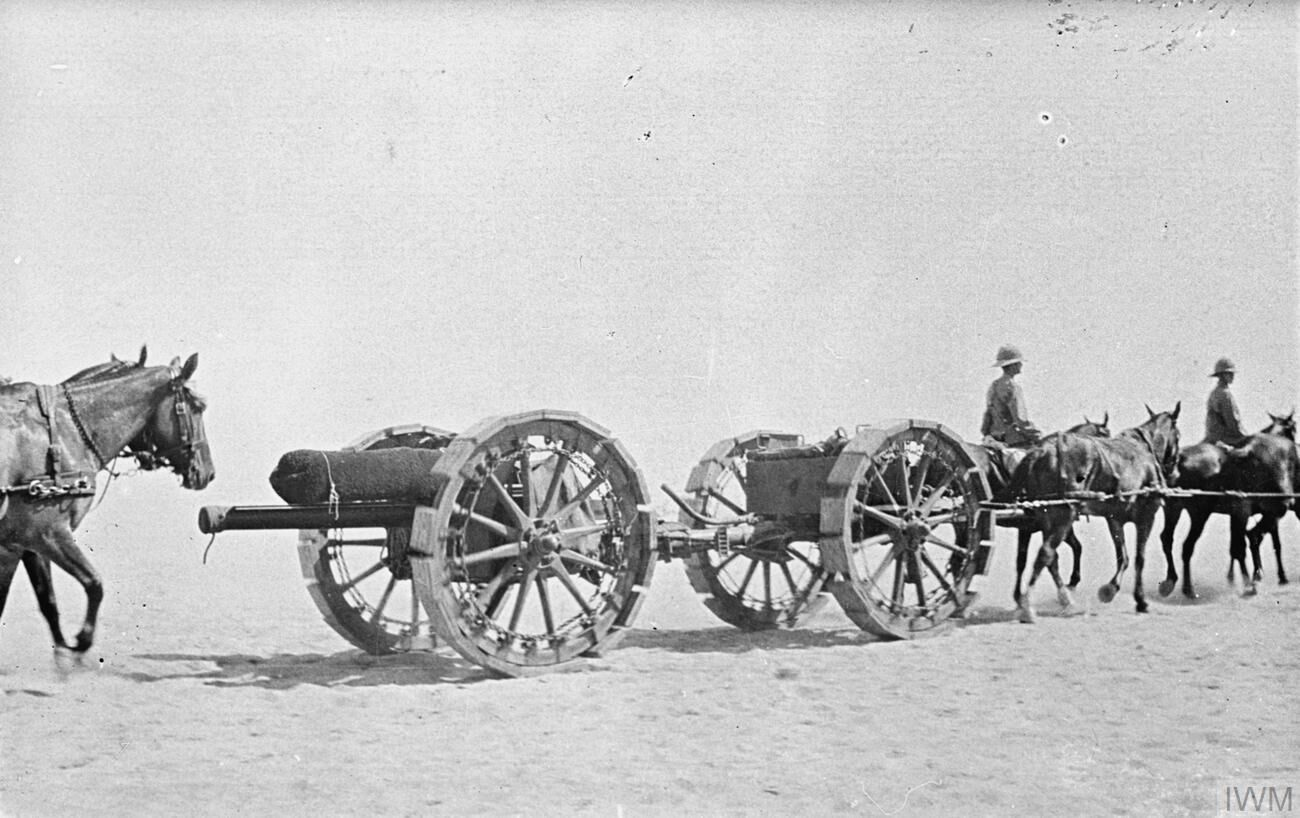
18-pounder with sand wheels

After breaking through the Gaza positions, the EEF pressed on to Jerusalem in appalling weather. XX Corps sent forward a flying column known as 'Mott's Detachment' that included 53rd (W) Division. Jerusalem fell on 8 December, but there was still heavy fighting to the end of the year as the Turks threw in counter-attacks.

XX Corps renewed its advance in March 1918, 53rd(W) Division pushing forward a little on 2 March, then again on 6 March against only slight opposition, before the whole Corps advanced on 8 March. 53rd (W) Division's main objective was the hill of Tell 'Asur, and it was supported by plentiful artillery as well as its own field brigades. The peak was taken, lost, and retaken, followed by four more unsuccessful Turkish counter-attacks. That night the division also took Chipp Hill, which had defied the neighbouring division during daylight, but on 10 March found the wadi in front too steep to climb, only passing over it during darkness on 12 March. The new line was held through the summer months.

In April, a large number of formations and units were stripped from the EEF to reinforce the BEF on the Western Front following the German spring offensive. 53rd (W) Division took over a section of the line from 74th (Yeomanry) Division on 9 April, with 160th Infantry Bde and CCLXVII Bde taking over the right sector.

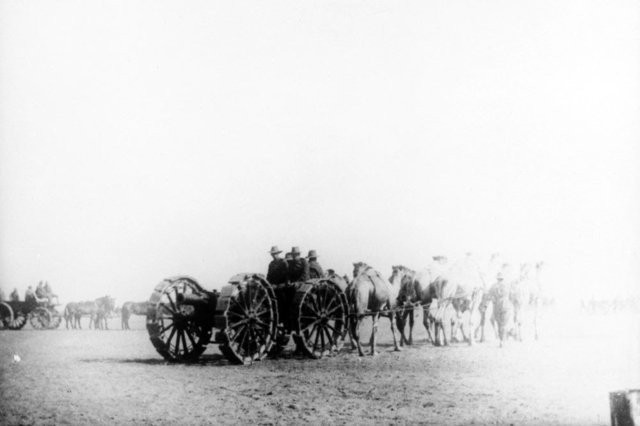
4.5-inch Howitzer with 'ped-rails' (sand tyres) around wheels

Unlike most RFA brigades, which had gained a howitzer battery in the 1916 reorganisation, CCXLVII had remained without one. On 8 April 1918 it was joined by 439 (Howitzer) Bty, equipped with four 4.5-inch howitzers passed over by CXVII (H) Brigade in 74th (Y) Division. The new battery had been specially formed with personnel drawn from 53rd (W) and 60th (2/2nd London) Divisional Ammunition Columns and from 9th Mountain Battery, RGA. In the summer of 1918 the 53rd Division was 'Indianised', with three quarters of the infantry battalions sent to the BEF and replaced by others drawn from the British Indian Army, but this did not affect the divisional artillery, which retained its composition to the end of the war.

At the climactic Battle of Megiddo, 53rd Division attacked late on the first day (18 September), after a 20-minute bombardment. The sound of the infantry's approach march had previously been drowned by slow shellfire on Keen's Hill. The gunners then fired smoke shells to guide the infantry's advance in the moonlight. One Turkish position held out, and a new attack was arranged for 19 November. During the afternoon, a party of Turks was found eating lunch in the open, and every field gun in range was called in to destroy them. When the attack went in at 19.00, it was completely successful, the main enemy position was taken and the guns could move forward. The pressure was kept up on 20 September: 160th Bde was involved in severe fighting without artillery support while the guns were moving up, and was driven off Gallows Hill. But then CCLXVII Bde came into action with a half-hour bombardment of Gallows Hill, breaking up a Turkish counter-attack that was being prepared, and demoralising the defenders of the hill, which was quickly reoccupied. By the end of the next day the Turkish army was shattered, and a general advance was ordered.

After the battle, the division was withdrawn to Alexandria before the Armistice of Mudros came into effect on 31 October. Demobilisation began on 20 December and was completed in June 1919. CCLXVII Brigade was placed in suspended animation.

=== 2/II Welsh Brigade, RFA ===
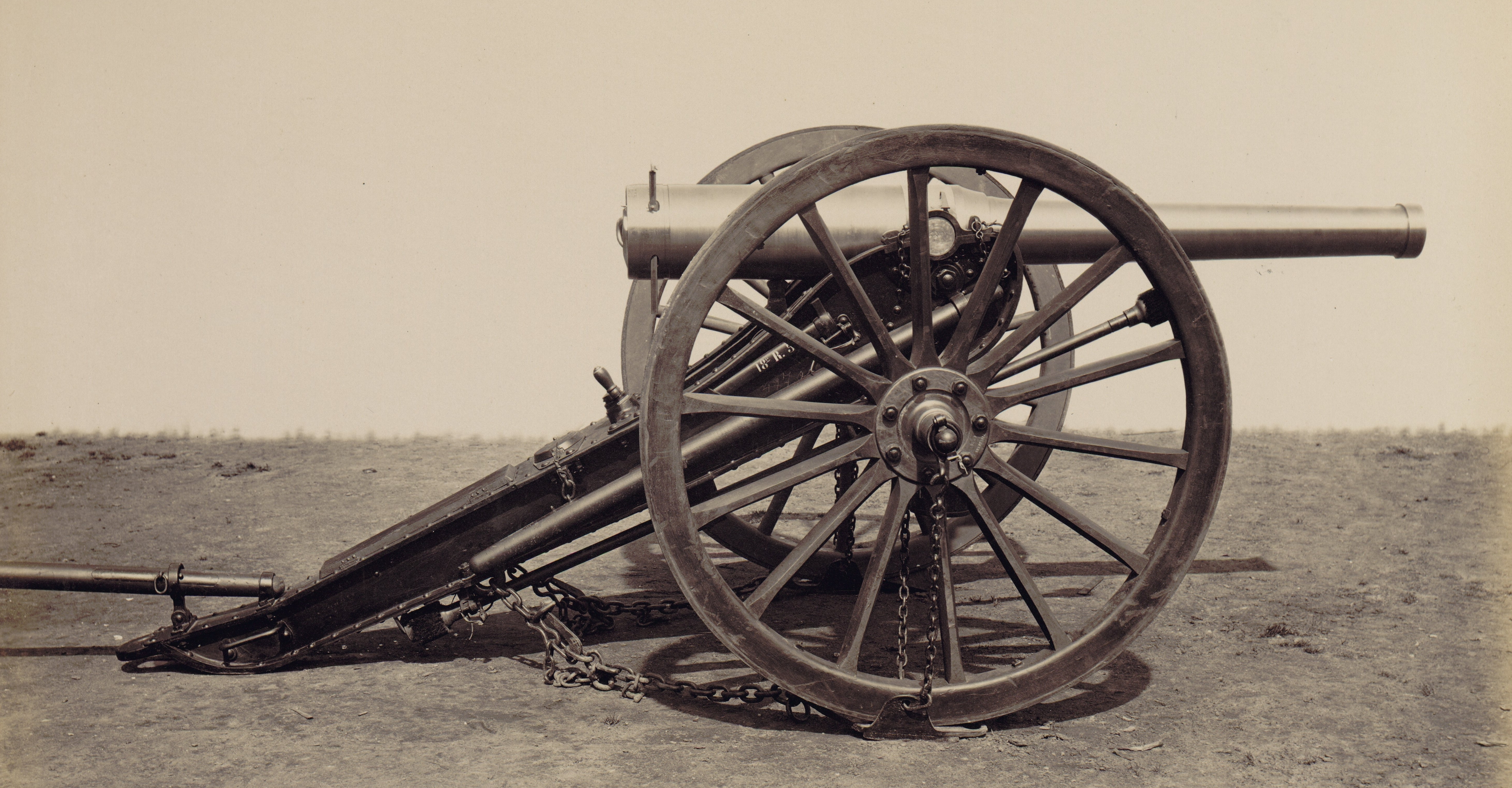
French De Bange 90 mm gun

Although 2/II Welsh Bde was raised at Cardiff as early as 14 September 1914, the 2nd Welsh Division (68th (2nd Welsh) Division from August 1915) did not concentrate at Northampton until Spring 1915, the brigade joining it on 29 April. It moved to Earlswood on 4 August 1915 and then arrived at Bedford to replace the 1st Line brigade on 2 November. Training of the units was made difficult by the lack of arms and equipment, and the requirement to provide drafts to the 1st Line overseas. In June the first saddlery and horses began to arrive, but no guns until August, when the brigade received four French De Bange 90 mm guns. Some ammunition wagons arrived in September, and eight more 90 mm guns in October. Training began to speed up, with the 90 mm guns standing in for 15-pounders. When the brigade arrived at Bedford it took over 12 x 15-pounders from the 1st Line. In December 1915, these in turn were replaced by modern 18-pounders.

68th (2nd Welsh) Division had been assigned a role in Home Defence in November when it joined First Army (Home Forces) in Central Force, with its units quartered across Eastern England. In May 1916, the brigade was numbered CCCXLI Brigade (341 Bde) and the batteries became A, B and C. The Home Defence divisions continually supplied drafts to units fighting overseas, and CCCXLI Bde had disappeared from 68th (2nd W) Division's order of battle by mid-1917.

== Interwar ==
=== 82nd (Welsh) Field Brigade, RA ===
The 2nd Welsh Brigade, RFA, was reformed in the 53rd (W) Division on 7 February 1920, with 5th–8th Glamorgan Batteries (the Cardigan Battery was not reformed). It was redesignated the 82nd (Welsh) Brigade, RFA, when the TF was reorganised as the Territorial Army (TA) in 1921 (becoming a Field Brigade, RA, in 1924 when the RFA was subsumed into the Royal Artillery). It had the following organisation:

- HQ at Dumfries Place, Cardiff
- 325 (Glamorgan) Bty
- 326 (Glamorgan) Bty
- 327 (Glamorgan) Bty
- 328 (Glamorgan) Bty (Howitzer)

=== 77th (Welsh) HAA Regiment, RA ===
In the late 1930s, the need for improved anti-aircraft (AA) defences for Britain's cities became apparent, and a programme of converting existing TA units was pushed forward. On 1 November 1938, the unit became 77th (Welsh) AA Brigade, RA - two months later, as with other AA Brigades, it was redesignated an AA Regiment - with the following organisation:

- HQ at Dumfries Place, Cardiff
- 239 (Glamorgan) AA Bty at Dumfries Place
- 240 (Glamorgan) AA Bty at Dumfries Place
- 241 (Glamorgan) AA Bty at Drill Hall, Pentre, Rhondda
- 242 (Glamorgan) AA Bty at Drill Hall, Pentre, Rhondda

== World War II ==
=== Mobilisation ===
The TA's AA units were mobilised on 23 September 1938 during the Munich Crisis, with units manning their emergency positions within 24 hours, even though many did not yet have their full complement of men or equipment. The emergency lasted three weeks, and they were stood down on 13 October. In February 1939 the existing AA defences came under the control of a new Anti-Aircraft Command. In June, a partial mobilisation of TA units was begun in a process known as 'couverture', whereby each AA unit did a month's tour of duty in rotation to man selected AA and searchlight positions. On 24 August, ahead of the declaration of war, AA Command was fully mobilised at its war stations.

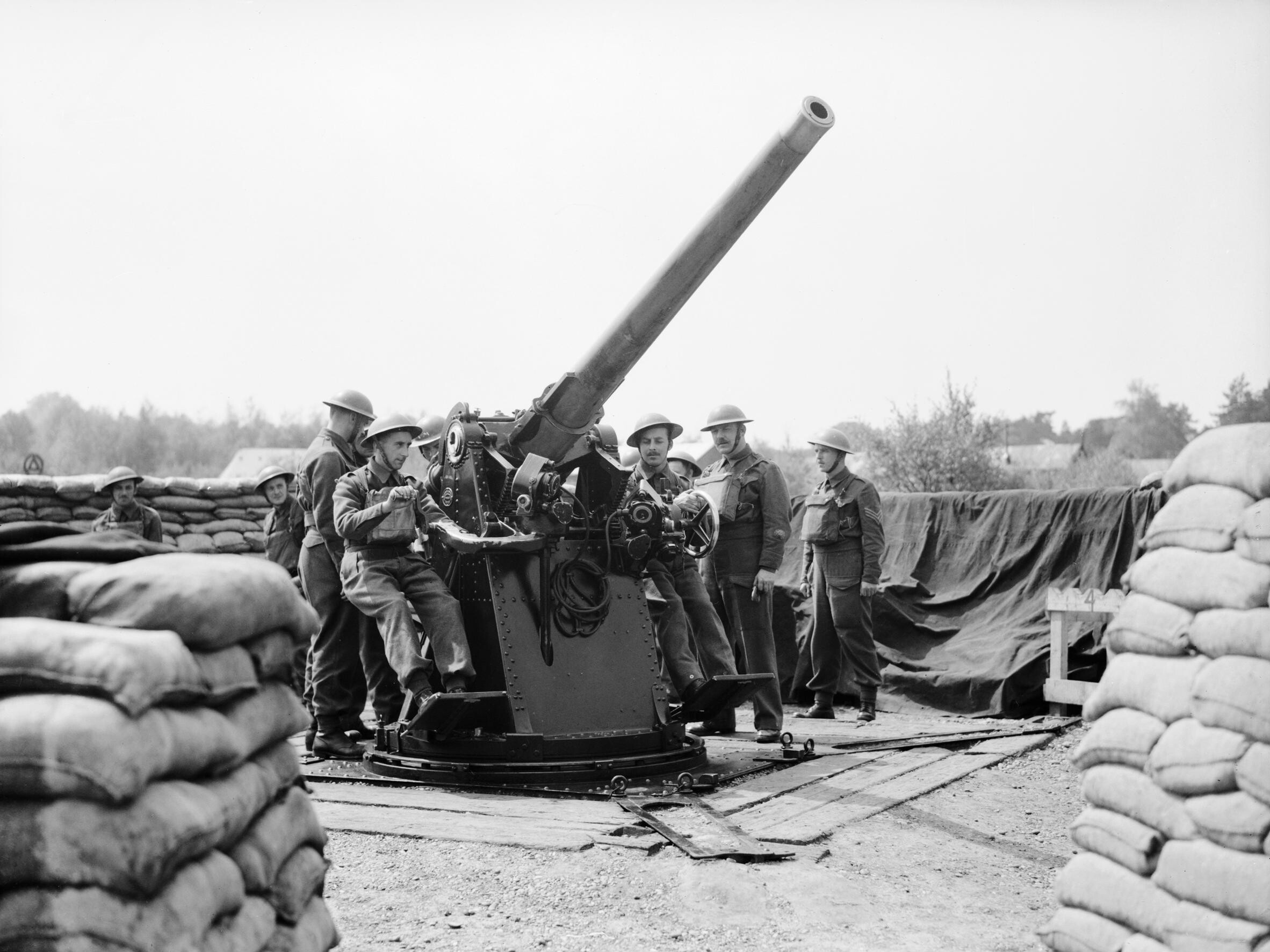
3-inch HAA gun of AA Command, 1940

=== Phoney War ===
77th (Welsh) AA Regiment came under the command of 45th Anti-Aircraft Brigade based at Cardiff and forming part of 5th Anti-Aircraft Division.

In mid-May 1940, as the Battle of France got under way, 45 AA Bde's units were ordered to find rifle detachments to guard against possible attacks by German paratroopers. The brigade also had to lend 240 AA Bty of 77th AA Rgt, with a Gun-laying radar (GL) detachment, to reinforce the defences of Littlehampton on the South Coast of England.

=== Battle of Britain ===
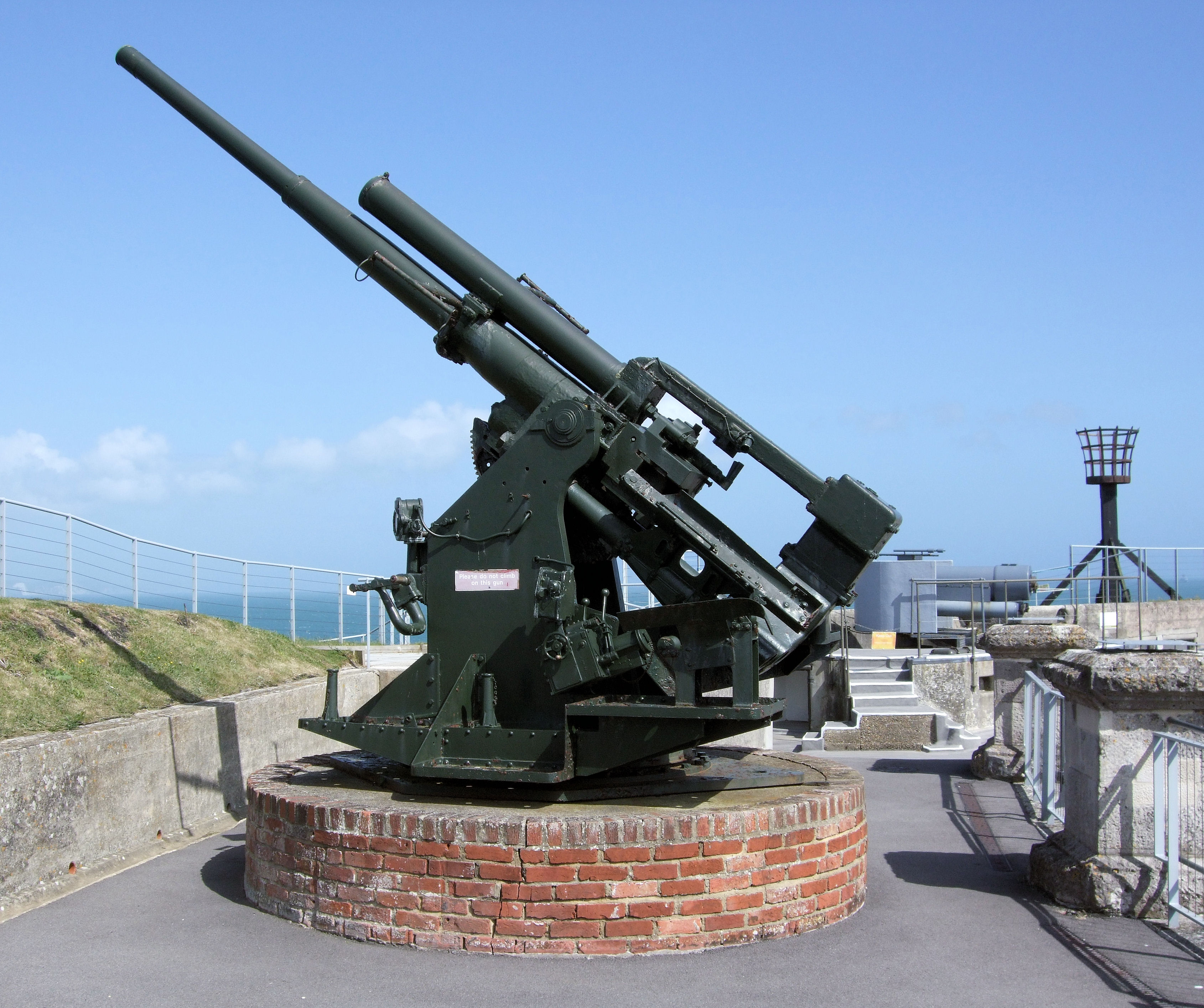
Preserved static 3.7-inch gun

On 1 June, all AA regiments equipped with 3-inch or the newer 3.7-inch guns were termed Heavy Anti-Aircraft (HAA) to distinguish them from the new Light Anti-Aircraft (LAA) units being formed. In August and September 1940, the Cardiff Gun Defence Area (GDA) had 26 HAA guns. The number of raids over South Wales, and the number of times the guns engaged, increased sharply during August. At this time, 77th (W) HAA Rgt was deployed as follows:

- 239 HAA Bty
  - The Bulwarks, Porthkerry – 4 x static 3.7-inch, later 8 x 3.7-inch with GL
  - Sully – 4 x 3.7-inch
- 240 HAA Bty
  - Llwyn-y-Grant, Cardiff – 2 x 3-inch
  - New House, Newport – 2 x 3-inch, 2 x 3.7-inch, later 4 x static 3.7-inch
- 241 HAA Bty – detached to 4th Anti-Aircraft Division
- 242 HAA Bty
  - Ely Racecourse, Cardiff – 4 x 3.7-inch
  - Intake, West Llandaff – 2 x 3.7-inch

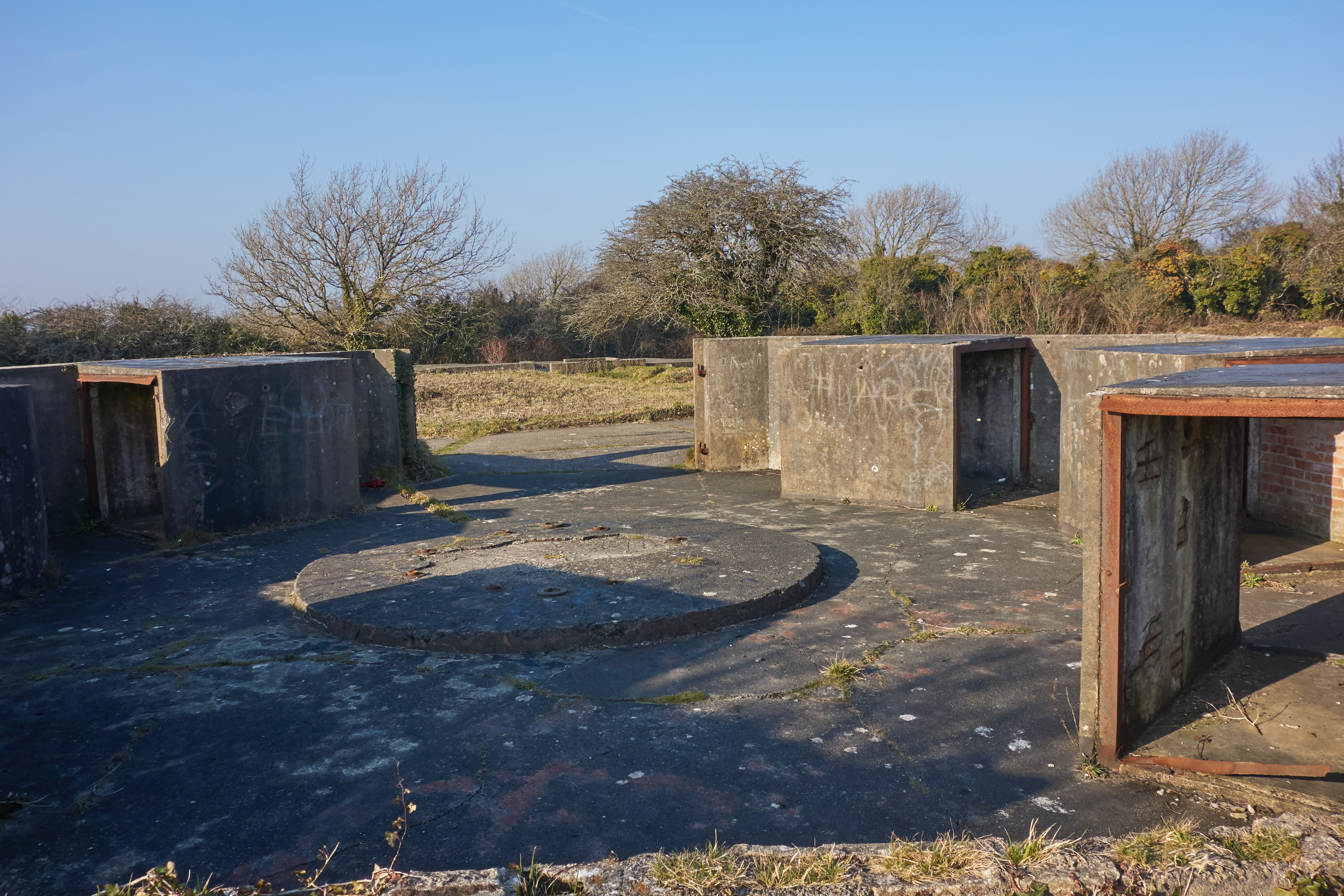
3.7-inch gun emplacements at Lavernock Battery

By late September, 242 HAA Bty had moved to:

  - Lavernock Fort, Penarth – 6 x static 3.7-inch with GL
  - Merry Harriers, Cardiff – 4 x mobile 3.7-inch

and 241 HAA Bty had returned and taken over:

  - Mardy Farm – 4 x static 3.7-inch
  - Llwyn-y-Grant, Cardiff – 2 x 3-inch, later 2 x 3-inch joined from New House, while 240 HAA Bty had taken over:
  - Pye Corner, Cardiff – 4 x static 3.7-inch with GL

=== Blitz ===
Formation sign of 9 AA Division

Following the Luftwaffe's defeat in the Battle of Britain, it began heavy night attacks on Britain's cities ('The Blitz'). At first, the towns of South Wales, including important coal and oil port facilities, refineries, steelworks and ordnance factories, were under almost nightly air attack, to which the AA defences replied as best they could. In the absence of effective GL radar control, at night the guns could only reply blindly with fixed barrages. There was a lull in the intensity of raids on South Wales from late September as the Luftwaffe concentrated on London and the industrial cities of the English Midlands, but there was a flare-up in activity over South Wales in late October. Some of this was aircraft dropping Parachute mines in the Bristol Channel, which were plotted by the HAA batteries' GL sets. In November, the AA guns began to claim some hits from GL-controlled fire – 239 HAA Bty claimed one aircraft shot down from the Bulwarks on the night of 7 November, and the 'Ball of Fire' concentrated barrage over Cardiff claimed another the next night.

As AA Command's resources expanded, 5 AA Division's responsibilities were split in November 1940 and a new 9 AA Division was created to cover South Wales and the Severn Valley. 45 AA Brigade was transferred to the new formation. There were heavy night raids on Cardiff on 2 January, 3 and 4 March 1941 (the Cardiff Blitz), with frequent smaller raids. By the end of February 1941, the HAA guns (3-inch, 3.7-inch and 4.5-inch) in the Cardiff GDA only numbered 52 out of a planned establishment of 64. This increased a month later to 56 guns, though further additions to the establishment were already being called for.

On 26 March 1941, 242 HAA Battery was sent to reinforce 62nd (Northumbrian) HAA Rgt in the Humber Gun Zone under 39 AA Bde. It then went to Southend-on-Sea. It had returned to regimental command by early May, when the Blitz came to an end. The regiment sent a cadre to 206th HAA Training Rgt at Arborfield, to provide the basis for a new 457 Bty; this was formed on 10 July 1941 and joined the newly-formed 132nd HAA Rgt.

As the flow of new AA units from the training centres continued, experienced units began to be prepared for overseas service, and 77th (Welsh) HAA Rgt was one of these. As the war establishment for regiments overseas was only three batteries, 242 HAA Bty was formally detached in early June 1941 - it went to Egypt, where it joined 51st (London) HAA Rgt. By October 1941, 77th HAA Rgt was part of the War Office Reserve, ready to embark.

=== Java ===
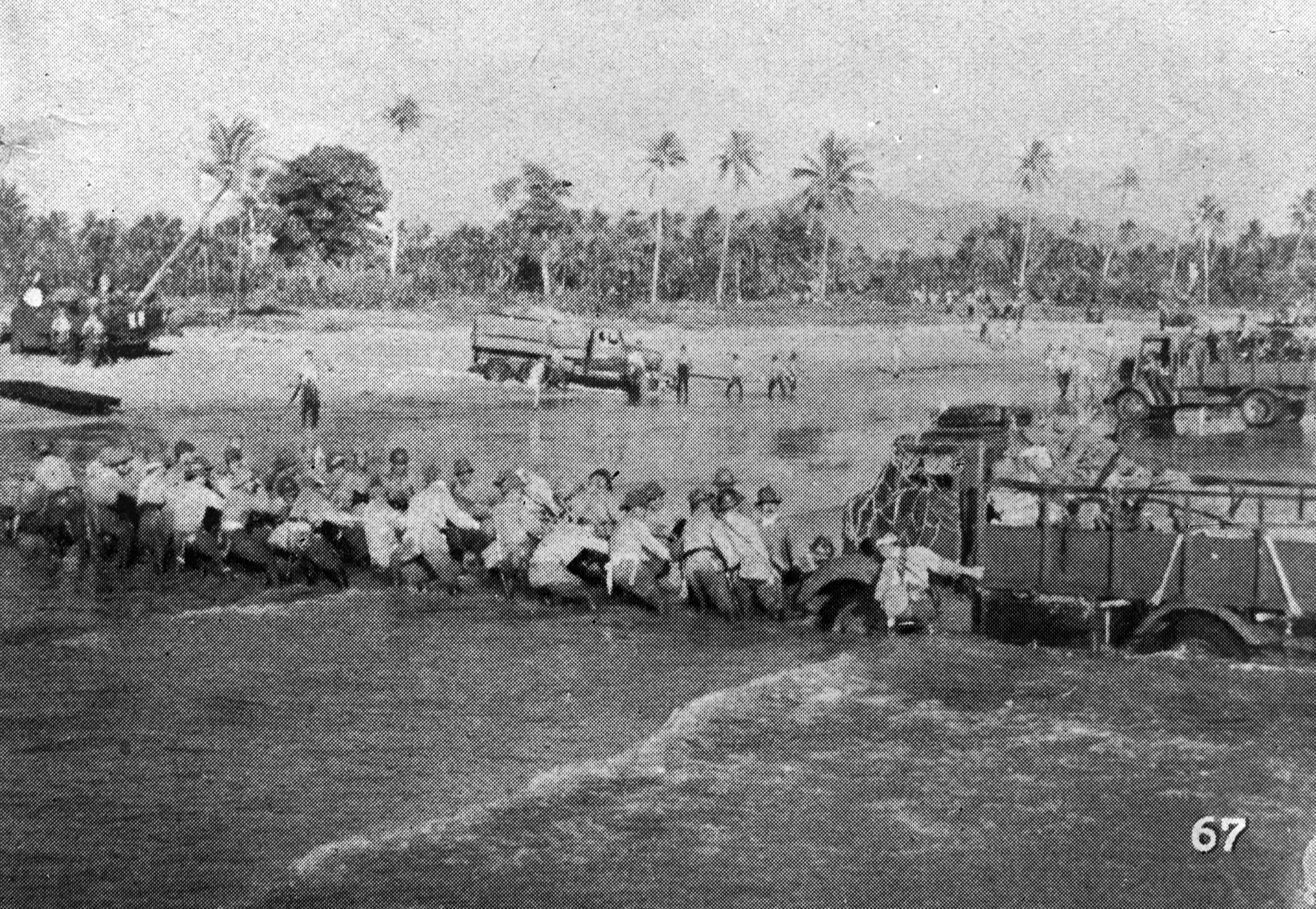
The Japanese invasion of Java

The regiment sailed on 6 December aboard Convoy WS14 to join Middle East Forces but, on 9 January 1942, while still at sea, it was diverted to the Far East following the Japanese invasion of Malaya. The convoy arrived at Singapore on 13 January, but most of the regiment's equipment went on to the Middle East, and it had to be re-equipped from the stockpile at Singapore. The airbases at Singapore were under heavy attack and the RAF redeployed its aircraft to the Dutch East Indies: the AA units aboard WS14 were diverted again, sailing on 30 January and arriving at Batavia on Java on 3/4 February.

As the regiment began to unload from the ships at Batavia on 4 February, it came under immediate air attack. Once the confusion cleared, the AA units deployed around the harbour. Then 16 AA Bde (whose HQ had disembarked at the same time) arranged for them to be sent to defend the most important ports and airfields. 77th HAA Regiment (less 239 HAA Bty left to defend Batavia) was sent to the naval base at Surabaya. Part of the regiment boarded an express train for Surabaya, but on the way this collided with a goods train, and three officers and 12 other ranks were killed, and another 60 officers and men injured.

When the Japanese attack on Java began, the 77th was the only fully equipped HAA regiment available; although two batteries of the Regular Army 6th HAA Rgt had been evacuated from Sumatra before it was captured, they had no guns and were sent to defend airfields as infantry. 77th HAA Regiment was soon in action at Surabaya, claiming three bombers shot down. Japanese landings on Java began on 1 March near Batavia, covered by bombing raids, with the airfields as their primary target. 77th HAA Regiment was forced to withdraw from Surabaya to Tjilatjap in the face of strong attacks, and one Troop was cut off and lost at Surabaya. 'Blackforce', a mixed force of Australians and British commanded by Brig Arthur Blackburn, VC, kept up an active defence for several days, but the Dutch commander ordered his units to cease fire on 8 March, and the remnants of 16 AA Bde including 77th HAA Rgt surrendered on 12 March, after destroying their guns. No records of the AA engagements over Java have survived, but 16 AA Bde claimed to have destroyed 26 Japanese aircraft.

The survivors of 77th (Welsh) HAA Regiment and the other British troops on Java spent the next three-and-a-half years as Prisoners of War (POWs), held in atrocious conditions. Large numbers died as a result of disease, overwork, brutal treatment, or shipwreck. The regiment, with 239, 240 and 241 Btys, was formally placed in suspended animation from 12 March 1942.

== Postwar ==
When the TA was reconstituted on 1 January 1947, the regiment was reformed as 282nd (Welsh) Heavy Anti-Aircraft Regiment (coincidentally, its old number 77 was taken by the Regular Army 6th HAA Rgt alongside which it had served in Java). The regiment was part of 71 AA Bde (the prewar 45 AA Bde) at Cardiff.

On 20 June 1950, the regiment absorbed 520th (Glamorgan) Light AA Rgt and, on 1 January 1954, it absorbed 602nd (Welch) HAA Rgt, in each case without changing its own designation. On 10 March 1955, AA Command was disbanded and there was a further round of mergers among the TA's AA units, with 282nd HAA Rgt absorbing 534th (Swansea) HAA Rgt. It appears to have joined 41 (AA) AGRA (TA) by this time.

This was followed on 1 May 1961 by amalgamation with the 281st (Glamorgan Yeomanry) and 283rd (Monmouthshire) Field Rgts to form Q (Welsh) Bty in 282nd (Glamorgan and Monmouthshire) Field Regiment. After several more rounds of mergers, the lineage is continued in 211 (South Wales) Bty in today's 104th Regiment Royal Artillery.

== Honorary Colonels ==
The following served as Honorary Colonel of the unit:

- J. Gaskell, CBE, VD, TD, appointed 18 December 1909

== Memorials ==
A memorial board to the dead of 77th (Welsh) HAA Rgt was carved with a penknife by a prisoner of war in Changi POW Camp, and hung in a church built by the POWs. The church was destroyed by the Japanese, but the memorial was later found and re-hung in the Tabernacle Welsh Baptist Chapel, The Hayes, Cardiff.

== Sources ==
- Maj A.F. Becke,History of the Great War: Order of Battle of Divisions, Part 2a: The Territorial Force Mounted Divisions and the 1st-Line Territorial Force Divisions (42–56), London: HM Stationery Office, 1935/Uckfield: Naval & Military Press, 2007, ISBN 1-847347-39-8.
- Maj A.F. Becke,History of the Great War: Order of Battle of Divisions, Part 2b: The 2nd-Line Territorial Force Divisions (57th–69th), with the Home-Service Divisions (71st–73rd) and 74th and 75th Divisions, London: HM Stationery Office, 1937/Uckfield: Naval & Military Press, 2007, ISBN 1-847347-39-8.
- Basil Collier, History of the Second World War, United Kingdom Military Series: The Defence of the United Kingdom, London: HM Stationery Office, 1957.
- Capt Cyril Falls, History of the Great War: Military Operations, Egypt and Palestine, Vol II, From June 1917 to the End of the War, London: HM Stationery Office, 1930/Imperial War Museum and Naval & Military Press, 2013, ISBN 1-84574951-0.
- Gen Sir Martin Farndale, History of the Royal Regiment of Artillery: The Forgotten Fronts and the Home Base 1914–18, Woolwich: Royal Artillery Institution, 1988, ISBN 1-870114-05-1.
- Gen Sir Martin Farndale, History of the Royal Regiment of Artillery: The Years of Defeat: Europe and North Africa, 1939–1941, Woolwich: Royal Artillery Institution, 1988/London: Brasseys, 1996, ISBN 1-85753-080-2.
- Gen Sir Martin Farndale, History of the Royal Regiment of Artillery: The Far East Theatre 1939–1946, London: Brasseys, 2002, ISBN 1-85753-302-X.
- J.B.M. Frederick, Lineage Book of British Land Forces 1660–1978, Vol I, Wakefield, Microform Academic, 1984, ISBN 1-85117-007-3.
- J.B.M. Frederick, Lineage Book of British Land Forces 1660–1978, Vol II, Wakefield, Microform Academic, 1984, ISBN 1-85117-009-X.
- Joslen, H. F. (2003) [1960]. Orders of Battle: Second World War, 1939–1945. Uckfield, East Sussex: Naval and Military Press. ISBN 978-1-84342-474-1.
- Norman E.H. Litchfield, The Territorial Artillery 1908–1988 (Their Lineage, Uniforms and Badges), Nottingham: Sherwood Press, 1992, ISBN 0-9508205-2-0.
- Norman Litchfield & Ray Westlake, The Volunteer Artillery 1859–1908 (Their Lineage, Uniforms and Badges), Nottingham: Sherwood Press, 1982, ISBN 0-9508205-0-4.
- Gen Sir Frederick Pile's despatch: "The Anti-Aircraft Defence of the United Kingdom from 28th July, 1939, to 15th April, 1945" London Gazette 18 December 1947
- Brig N.W. Routledge, History of the Royal Regiment of Artillery: Anti-Aircraft Artillery 1914–55, London: Royal Artillery Institution/Brassey's, 1994, ISBN 1-85753-099-3
- Col J.D. Sainsbury, The Hertfordshire Yeomanry Regiments, Royal Artillery, Part 2: The Heavy Anti-Aircraft Regiment 1938–1945 and the Searchlight Battery 1937–1945, Welwyn: Hertfordshire Yeomanry and Artillery Trust/Hart Books, 2003, ISBN 0-948527-06-4.
- Titles and Designations of Formations and Units of the Territorial Army, London: War Office, 7 November 1927 (RA sections also summarised in Litchfield, Appendix IV).
- Patrick Walker, 6th Heavy Anti-Aircraft Regiment, Royal Artillery, Rev Edn, Gloucester: Choir Press, 2013, ISBN 978-0-9562190-4-6
- Maj C.H. Dudley Ward, History of the 53rd (Welsh) Division (T.F.) 1914–1918, Cardiff: Western Mail, 1927/Uckfield: Naval & Military, 2004, ISBN 978-1-845740-50-4.
- Ray Westlake, Tracing the Rifle Volunteers, Barnsley: Pen and Sword, 2010, ISBN 978-1-84884-211-3.
- Maj-Gen S. Woodburn Kirby, History of the Second World War, United Kingdom Military Series: The War Against Japan Vol I, The Loss of Singapore, London: HM Stationery Office, 1957/Uckfield: Naval & Military, 2004, ISBN 1-845740-60-2.

=== External sources ===
- British Army website
- Mark Conrad, The British Army, 1914 (archive site)
- British Army units from 1945 on
- The Drill Hall Project
- Dutch East Indies Campaign 1941–1942
- Great War Centenary Drill Halls.
- Imperial War Museum, War Memorials Register
- The Long, Long Trail
- Orders of Battle at Patriot Files
- The Regimental Warpath 1914–1918 (archive site)
- Land Forces of Britain, the Empire and Commonwealth – Regiments.org (archive site)
- Royal Artillery 1939–1945
- Graham Watson, The Territorial Army 1947 Archived 9 December 2021 at the Wayback Machine
