= Swansea Rifles =

3rd (Swansea Rifles) Glamorganshire RVC 6th (Glamorgan) Battalion, Welch Regiment 67th (Welch) Searchlight Regiment, RA 602 (Welch) HAA Regiment, RA
- Active: 12 October 1859–1 January 1954
- Country: United Kingdom
- Branch: Volunteer Force/Territorial Army
- Role: Infantry; Searchlights; Anti-aircraft artillery
- Size: 1–3 Battalions
- Part of: 28th Division; 1st Division; Anti-Aircraft Command
- Garrison/HQ: Swansea; Cardiff (from 1938)
- Nicknames: 'Dilwyn's' 'The Prince of Wales's Own'
- Motto: Better death than shame
- Engagements: First World War: Hohenzollern Redoubt; Battle of the Somme; Battle of Passchendaele; German spring offensive; Hundred Days Offensive; Second World War: Battle of Britain; Cardiff Blitz

The Swansea Rifles, later the 6th (Glamorgan) Battalion of the Welch Regiment, was a Volunteer unit of the British Army from 1859 to 1954. It fought on the Western Front in the First World War. As a searchlight unit in the Second World War it defended South Wales against air raids. It continued in the postwar Territorial Army (TA) as a heavy anti-aircraft artillery regiment until amalgamated with other Welsh units in 1954.

== Volunteers ==
The enthusiasm for the Volunteer movement following an invasion scare in 1859 saw the creation of many Rifle Volunteer Corps (RVCs) composed of part-time soldiers eager to supplement the Regular British Army in time of need. One such unit was the 3rd (Swansea Rifles) Glamorganshire RVC formed in Swansea on 12 October 1859, under the command of the local industrialist and Member of Parliament, Lewis Llewelyn Dillwyn, who was commissioned as captain.

From February 1861 the unit was attached to the 2nd Administrative Battalion, Glamorganshire RVCs, based in Swansea, but it soon reached a strength of four companies and became an independent corps under the command of Dillwyn, now promoted to major, and the Admin Battalion was broken up some time in 1862. In 1864 the 5th Glamorgan RVC at Penllergaer was attached from the 1st Admin Bn to the Swansea Rifles but was disbanded in 1873. The 4th Glamorgan RVC from the 1st Admin Bn was also attached to the Swansea Rifles 1872–73.

Dillwyn continued to command the unit (which was often known as 'Dillwyn's') for many years, rising to Lieutenant-Colonel Commandant in 1877 and full colonel in 1888. In 1881, while inspecting the troops after they had completed a week's training, he fell from his horse and sustained serious injuries. Dillwyn was succeeded in command by John Crow Richardson of Glanbrydan Park, who had enlisted in the unit as a private in December 1859 and was commissioned as ensign in 1864. He became a full colonel in 1897 and commanded the battalion into the 1900s.,

Under the 'Localisation of the Forces' scheme introduced by the Cardwell Reforms of 1872, Volunteers were grouped into county brigades with their local Regular and Militia battalions. The 3rd Glamorgan was placed with the 41st (Welsh) and 69th Foot in Brigade No 24 (Pembroke, Carmarthen and Glamorgan) in Western District. The Childers Reforms of 1881 took Cardwell's reforms further, the linked battalions became single regiments and the Volunteers were formally affiliated to their local Regular regiment. The 41st and 69th combined to form the Welch Regiment (Welch Regiment from 1920) and the 3rd Glamorgan RVC became a six-company Volunteer Battalion of the regiment. It ranked as the regiment's 4th VB, but did not change its traditional title, despite the potential for confusion with the regiment's 3rd (Glamorgan) VB at Pontypridd. The battalion headquarters (HQ) was at Prince of Wales Hall, Singleton Street, Swansea.

When a comprehensive mobilisation scheme for the Volunteers was established after the Stanhope Memorandum of December 1888, the 3rd Glamorgan RVC was assigned to the Welsh Brigade, the South Wales Brigade from 1895, then the Severn Brigade charged with defending the ports of the Severn Estuary, and back to the Welsh Brigade by 1902.

A detachment of volunteers from the battalion served in the Second Boer War, winning the unit its first Battle honour: South Africa 1900–1902. The battalion expanded to nine companies in 1900, and then to twelve in 1905 when the Swansea personnel (C, D and E Companies) of the 2nd VB were transferred to it.

== Territorial Force ==
When the Volunteers were subsumed into the new Territorial Force (TF) under the Haldane Reforms of 1908, the unit became 6th (Glamorgan) Battalion, Welsh Regiment, with the following organisation:

- HQ at Swansea
- A Company at Maesteg
- B Company at Swansea
- C Company at Swansea
- D Company at Swansea
- E Company at Hafod
- F Company at Neath
- G Company at Clydach
- H Company at Gorseinon

The battalion formed part of the independent South Wales Brigade in the TF. On 9 March 1911 Lord Ninian Crichton-Stuart, second son of the 3rd Marquess of Bute of Cardiff Castle, was commissioned Lt-Col in the battalion and took command the following year. Lord Ninian was a former lieutenant in the Scots Guards and MP for Cardiff since 1910.

== First World War ==
=== Mobilisation ===
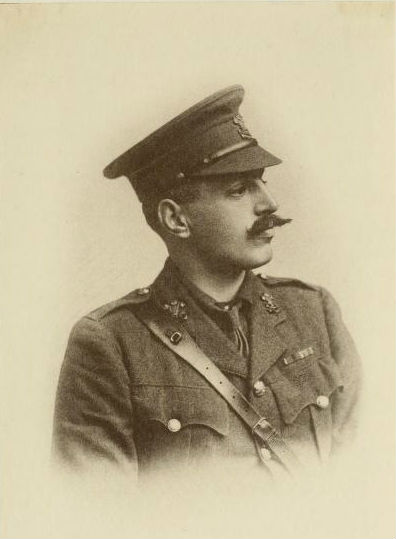
Lt-Col Lord Ninian Crichton-Stuart.

On the outbreak of war on 4 August 1914, units of the TF were invited to volunteer for Overseas Service and Lt-Col Crichton-Stuart volunteered his battalion. On 31 August 1914, the War Office authorised the formation of a reserve or 2nd Line unit for each TF unit where 60 per cent or more of the men had volunteered for Overseas Service. The titles of these 2nd Line units would be the same as the original, but distinguished by a '2/' prefix. In this way duplicate battalions, brigades and divisions were created, mirroring those TF formations being sent overseas.

=== 1/6th (Glamorgan) Battalion ===
Having mobilised at Swansea the 1/6th (Glamorgan) Bn was the first Welsh TF unit to go overseas. Crichton-Stuart addressed the unit at the drill hall in Swansea prior to their departure, saying 'The greatest honour a man can receive is that he has been provided with a chance to give, if need be, the greatest that he has, which is his life, for his country. I do not doubt every man on this parade will give it and give it as willingly as I mean to give it myself.'

The battalion landed at Le Havre on 28 October 1914 to work on the Lines of Communication. Based at Boulogne and Saint-Omer the men were employed in handling railway traffic, escorting prisoners, and providing carrying and burial parties. In 1915 a number of the TF battalions in France were used to reinforce the weak brigades of the Regular divisions. On 5 July 1915 1/6th Bn joined 84th Bde of 28th Division, in which the 1st Bn Welsh Regiment had been serving since its return from India in late 1914. The division had already suffered heavy casualties in the Second Battle of Ypres.

==== Hohenzollern Redoubt ====
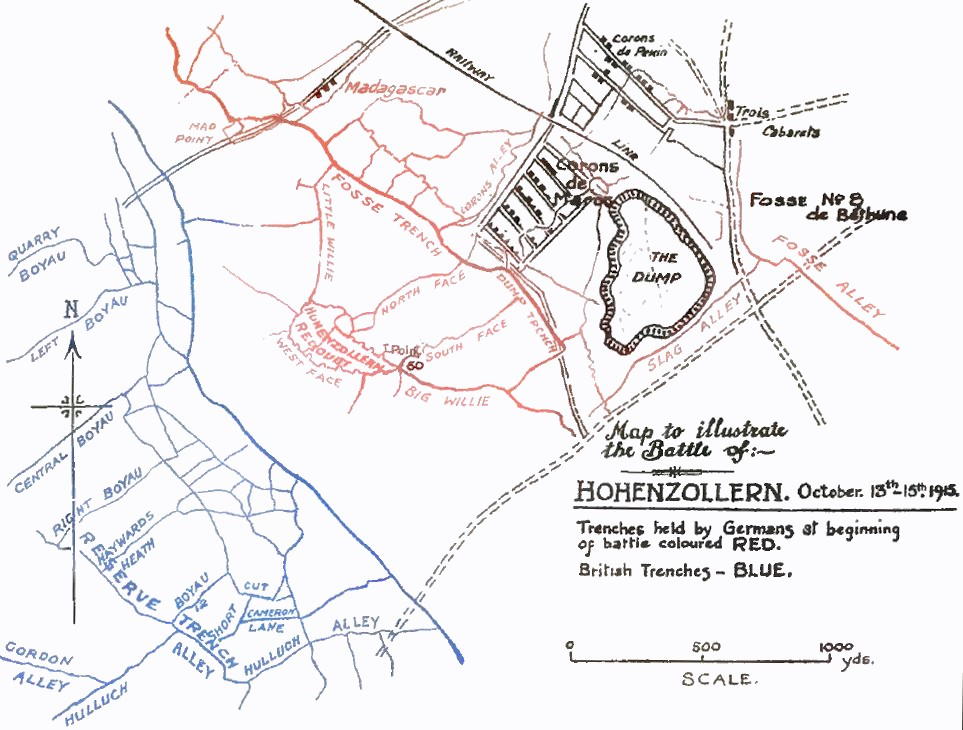
The Hohenzollern Redoubt in October 1915.

At the end of September 28 Division moved up to join the Battle of Loos. 85th Brigade went in first on 27 September to continue the actions against the Hohenzollern Redoubt. By 30 September the brigade was exhausted and was relieved by 84th Brigade. At 20.00 on 1 October the 1st Welsh launched a surprise attack on 'Little Willie' trench, a section of which they captured despite heavy casualties. The following day the Germans subjected the trench to heavy bombardment and counter-attacks. The 1st Welsh were cut off and supplies of food, water and ammunition could not be carried to them across No man's land. Crichton-Stuart ordered his men to dig a sap across to them, which was completed about 14.30. But it was too late: the 1st Welsh had to be withdrawn from Little Willie under covering fire from the 1/6th Welsh. Crichton-Stuart was killed while looking over the parapet to supervise his battalion's fire. One report stated that Crichton-Stuart was preparing to lead a counter-attack to recover his close friend Maj Reginald Browning of 1/6th Bn who was still in the abandoned trench. Lt-Col Lord Ninian Crichton-Stuart was buried in Béthune Town Cemetery. Major Browning is commemorated on the Loos Memorial to the Missing, together with 19 other men of 1/6th Bn (and many more from 1st Bn) who died on 1–2 October 1915 and have no known grave.

On 19 October 1915, 28th Division was given warning orders for a move overseas (it eventually went to Salonika) and the 1/6th Bn's period of attachment ended on 23 October when it transferred to 3rd Bde in 1st Division, in which 2nd Welsh were serving.

==== Further actions ====
On 15 May 1916, the 1/6th Welsh became the Pioneer Battalion of 1st Division, a role that it carried out for the rest of the war. The role of divisional pioneers was to provide working parties to assist the divisional Royal Engineers in tasks ranging from trench digging and wiring, to road making, while remaining fighting soldiers. Typically in action they were used to consolidate captured positions, form flank guards etc. 1st Division took part in the following major actions during the war:

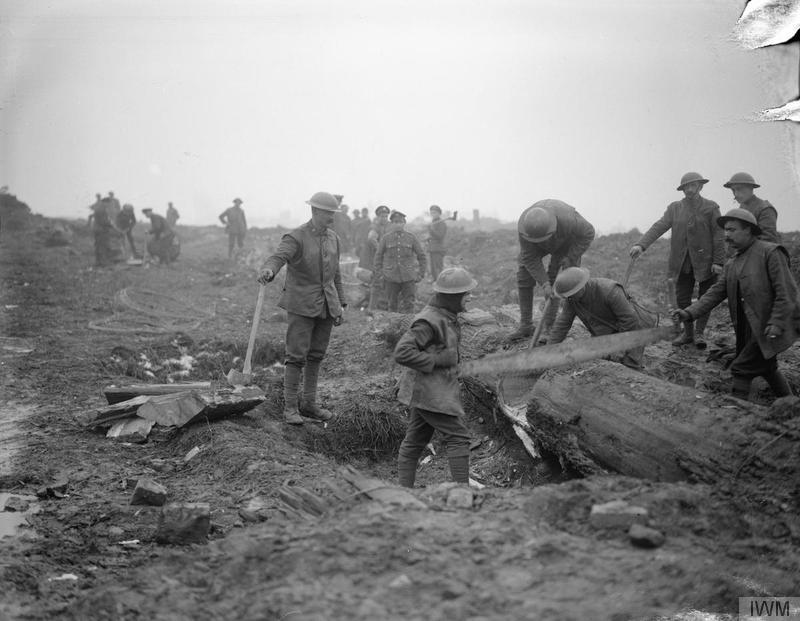
Men of a pioneer battalion at work on the Western Front, 1918.

1916

- Battle of the Somme:
  - Battle of Bazentin Ridge (14–17 July)
  - Battle of Pozières Ridge (23–26 July, 15 August–3 September)
  - Battle of Flers–Courcelette
  - Battle of Morval (25–28 September)

1917

- German Retreat to the Hindenburg Line (Operation Alberich) (14–21 March)
- Operations on the Flanders Coast (21 June–20 October)
  - Defence of Nieuport (10 July)
- Third Battle of Ypres:
  - Second Battle of Passchendaele (5–10 November)

1918

- German spring offensive:
  - Battle of Estaires (9–11 April)
  - Battle of Hazebrouck (15 April)
  - Battle of Béthune 918–19 April)
- Allied Hundred Days Offensive:
  - Battle of the Drocourt-Quéant Line (2–3 September)
  - Battle of Épehy (18 September)
  - Battle of the St Quentin Canal (29 September–2 October)
  - Battle of the Beaurevoir Line (3–5 October)
  - Battle of the Selle (17–25 October)
  - Battle of the Sambre (4 November)
  - Crossing of the Sambre–Oise Canal (4 November)

After the Armistice with Germany came into force on 11 November 1918, 1st Division was ordered to the Rhine as part of the occupation forces. On 24 December it reached Bonn and joined the British Army of the Rhine. 6th Battalion Welsh Regiment was disembodied on 25 October 1919.

=== 2/6th (Glamorgan) Battalion ===
2/6th Bn Welsh Regiment was formed at Swansea in December 1914. The primary role of 2nd Line battalions at this stage was to train reinforcement drafts for their 1st Line battalions serving overseas. In November 1915 the 2nd Line battalions of the independent South Wales Brigade were absorbed by units of the 68th (2nd Welsh) Division concentrating at Bedford for home defence as part of First Army (Home Forces) of Central Force. The 2/6th Welsh were absorbed by the 2/5th (Flintshire) Bn, Royal Welch Fusiliers, which remained in home defence until it was disbanded in March 1918.

=== 3/6th (Glamorgan) Battalion ===
3rd Line TF battalions were formed to take over the duty of training drafts for the 1st and 2nd Lines. 3/6th Battalion Welsh Regiment was formed at Swansea on 23 March 1915. It was redesignated 6th (Glamorgan) Reserve Battalion on 8 April 1916 and on 1 September 1916 was absorbed into the regiment's 4th Reserve Bn.

== Interwar ==
The TF reformed on 17 February 1920, reorganising as the Territorial Army (TA) the following year. On 31 December 1921 the 6th (Glamorgan) Bn absorbed the 7th (Cyclist) Bn of the Welch Regiment (as it now spelled its title) at Cardiff.

=== 67th (Welch) Searchlight Regiment ===
In the 1930s, the increasing need for anti-aircraft (AA) defence for Britain's cities was addressed by converting a number of TA infantry battalions into searchlight (S/L) units. The 6th Welch was one unit selected for this role, becoming 6th (Glamorgan) Battalion, Welch Regiment (67th Searchlight Regiment) on 1 November 1938, with HQ, 450, 451 and 452 S/L Companies at 8 St Andrews Crescent, Cardiff. It formed part of 45th Anti-Aircraft Brigade in 5th AA Division, responsible for the defence of Cardiff and Newport.

== Second World War ==
=== Mobilisation ===
90 cm Projector Anti-Aircraft, displayed at Fort Nelson, Portsmouth

In February 1939, the existing AA defences came under the control of a new Anti-Aircraft Command. In June a partial mobilisation of the TA was begun in a process known as 'couverture', whereby each AA unit did a month's tour of duty in rotation to man selected AA and S/L positions. On 24 August, ahead of the declaration of war, AA Command was fully mobilised at its war stations. In the absence of sufficient light AA (LAA) guns, a number of Vital Points (VPs) were defended by Lewis guns (LGs) manned by S/L crews.

There was little activity during the so-called Phoney War period, but this ended on 10 May with the German invasion of the Low Countries. 45 AA Brigade's units – particularly the widely spaced S/L sites – were ordered to find rifle and LG detachments to guard against possible attacks by German paratroopers. Five infantry riflemen were temporarily assigned to each S/L site, of which 67th S/L Rgt had two near Swansea and 37 around Newport (67th had to find their own additional riflemen for four of these sites). If paratroops had landed, these detachments would have been sent out to hunt them down or form roadblocks and picquets round them until reinforcements arrived. 67th S/L Regiment was ordered to have three "flying columns" of riflemen in lorries ready at 15 minutes' notice to reinforce these detachments. At this time the company HQs were:

- 450 S/L Co at Castleton, Newport
- 451 S/L Co at Ynys Hafod, Usk
- 452 S/L Co at Vivian Park, Port Talbot, manning VPs

=== Battle of Britain ===
After the British Expeditionary Force was evacuated from Dunkirk, the German Luftwaffe began almost nightly minor air raids, often by single aircraft, against the dock facilities, steelworks and ordnance factories of South Wales, or minelaying in the Bristol Channel, though the daylight Battle of Britain was mainly fought over Southern England. The S/L layout in South Wales supported the AA guns and Royal Air Force (RAF) night fighters. On 28 June, 67th S/L Rgt was ordered to hand over its VPs at Port Talbot to a new LAA unit and move the detachments to Clanna, near Bridgend, to increase the S/L concentration in the Cardiff Gun Defence Area (GDA).

On 1 August 1940, all S/L units were transferred to the Royal Artillery (RA), the 6th Bn Welch becoming 67th (Welch) Searchlight Regiment and the S/L companies were redesignated as batteries.

During the summer, the AA defences of South Wales were bolstered by a number of units that had been re-equipped after evacuation from Dunkirk and Norway. This allowed 45 AA Bde to complete the illuminated areas of South Wales. The number of raids over South Wales, and the number of times the S/Ls and guns engaged, increased sharply at the end of August.

=== Cardiff Blitz ===
Formation sign of 9 AA Division.

The expansion of AA Command led to 5th AA Division being split up, South Wales coming under the command of 9th AA Division. 45 AA Brigade was split in two, the Swansea defences being taken over by a new 61 AA Bde, while 45 AA Bde concentrated round the Cardiff GDA (covering Barry and Newport as well as Cardiff). The S/L detachments were widely spread across brigade boundaries and there was an experiment to use S/Ls in a 'Cardiff–Newport Dazzle Area'.

As part of AA Command's expansion, 67th S/L Rgt supplied a cadre of experienced men to provide the basis for 536 S/L Battery formed on 12 December 1940 at 230 S/L Training Rgt at Blandford Camp with personnel mainly from Newcastle upon Tyne. This new battery then joined 89th S/L Rgt at Exeter.

After its defeat in the Battle of Britain, the Luftwaffe switched to night bombing of Britain's industrial cities (The Blitz). Much of this was directed against London, but Cardiff was heavily bombed on 2 January, Swansea on 19 and 20 February, and Cardiff again on 3 and 4 March (the Cardiff Blitz).

=== Mid-war ===
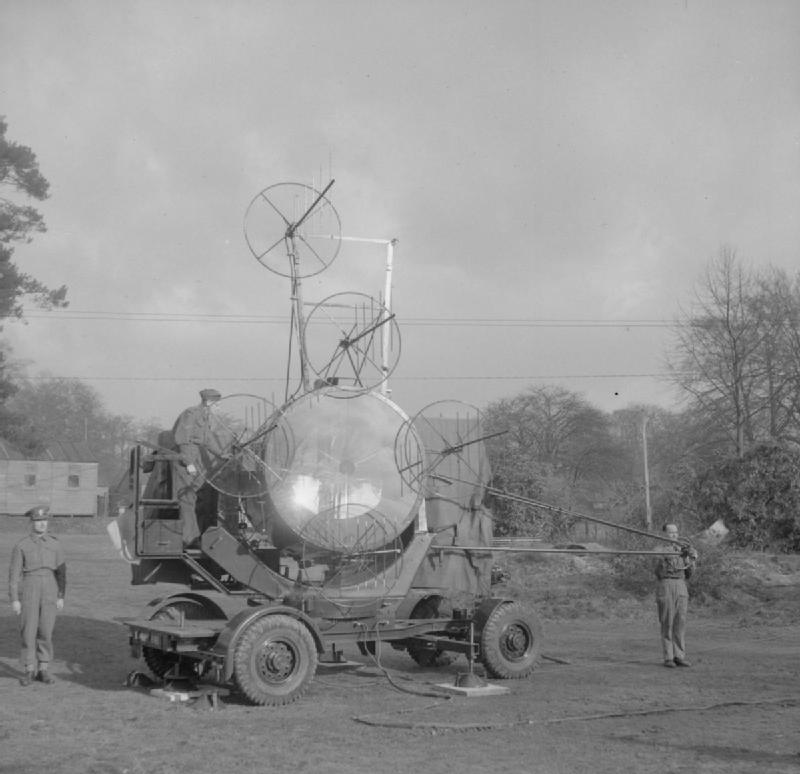
150 cm Searchlight with AA Radar No 2 (SLC or 'Elsie')

After a busy period for the AA defences of South Wales in early May 1941, the Blitz effectively ended in the middle of the month. Desultory raiding continued through June and July while the gaps in AA defences were filled as more equipment and units became available. Searchlights, now assisted by Searchlight Control (SLC or 'Elsie') radar, were reorganised, with a 'Killer Belt' established between the Cardiff and Bristol GDAs to cooperate closely with RAF night fighters.

67th S/L Regiment remained with 45 AA Bde for the next two years. However, during September 1942 451 and 452 S/L Btys were attached to 11th AA Division, which covered the West Midlands of England. Shortly afterwards AA Command underwent a major reorganisation and the AA Divisions were replaced by larger AA groups. 11th AA Division was subsumed into 4 AA Group, while 45 AA Bde was in 3 AA Group. By early November the whole of 67th S/L Rgt moved to 54 AA Bde in 4 AA Gp, covering the Birmingham–Coventry area.

In mid-1943, AA Command was being forced to release manpower for overseas service, particularly Operation Overlord (the planned Allied invasion of Normandy). After September 1943, 54 AA Bde only had 67 S/L Rgt under its command, and the brigade HQ began disbanding on 28 November. 67th S/L Regiment came under the control of 60 AA Bde in 3 AA Gp, covering South West England.

=== 608 (Welch) Infantry Regiment ===
By late 1944, the Luftwaffe was suffering from such shortages of pilots, aircraft and fuel that serious aerial attacks on the UK could be discounted and the War Office began reorganising surplus AA regiments into infantry battalions for duties in the rear areas. 67th Searchlight Rgt was one of those selected for conversion, and on 4 November 1944 was redesignated 67th (Welch) Garrison Regiment, RA.

Meanwhile 21st Army Group fighting in North West Europe was suffering a severe manpower shortage, particularly among the infantry. In January 1945, the War Office accelerated the conversion of surplus artillery into infantry units, primarily for line of communication and occupation duties, thereby releasing trained infantry for frontline service. 67 Garrison Regiment was redesignated again, becoming 608 (Welch) Infantry Regiment, RA on 13 February. It went to North West Europe in May and did duty with 306 Infantry Brigade on the Lines of Communication for 21st Army Group after VE Day.

== Postwar ==
When the TA was reconstituted on 1 January 1947, 67th S/L Rgt was reformed at Cardiff as 602 (Welch) Heavy Anti-Aircraft Rgt. Now equipped with Heavy AA guns rather than S/Ls, it formed part of 71 AA Bde (the former 45 AA Bde at Cardiff).

On 1 January 1954 the regiment was merged into 282 (Welsh) HAA Rgt. After several more rounds of mergers the lineage is continued in 211 (South Wales) Bty in today's 104th Regiment Royal Artillery.

A new 6th Bn Welch Regiment was formed on 1 October 1956 by the redesignation of 16th (Welsh) Bn, Parachute Regiment. It was later merged into 5th/6th (Territorial) Bn, Welch Regiment.

== Uniforms and insignia ==
The original uniform of the 3rd (Swansea Rifles) Glamorganshire RVC was scarlet with green facings, changing to white facings in the 1890s.

During the First World War, members of the 6th Welch were presented with ribbons in the regimental colours of white/red/dark green by the CO's wife, Lady Crichton-Stuart. This ribbon was worn as a regimental flash, divided vertically into three equal sections, by 602 (M) HAA Rgt from 1947 to 1954.

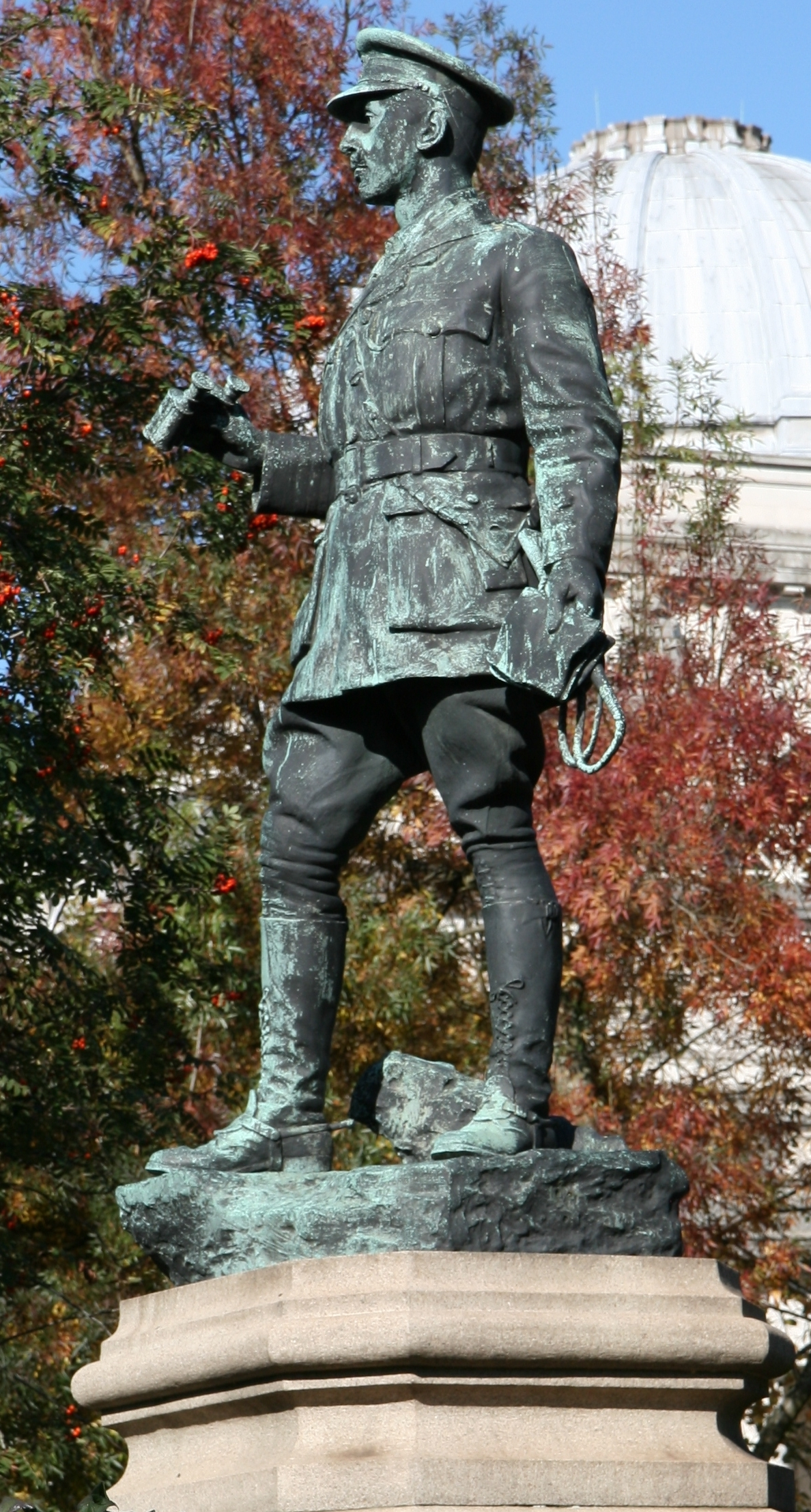
Statue of Lt-Col Lord Ninian Crichton-Stuart, MP, at Gorsedd Gardens, Cathays Park

== Memorials ==
The battalion's First World War memorial is in Christ Church (Garrison Church of Swansea), Oystermouth Road, Swansea, consisting of a brass plate with 298 names of men who died on service. An addendum carries six further names of men who died in other 20th century wars.

There is a bronze statue of Lt-Col Lord Ninian Crichton-Stuart, MP, at Gorsedd Gardens, Cathays Park, in Cardiff. Crichton-Stuart's coat of arms appears on a shield in the Chamber of the House of Commons along with those of 18 other MPs who died in the First World War.

The Welch Regiment War Memorial to the fallen of the whole regiment is at Maindy Barracks in Cathays, Cardiff.

== Honorary colonels ==
When the Prince of Wales (later King Edward VII) visited South Wales in 1883, the 3rd Glamorgan RVC provided guards of honour, and afterwards the Prince agreed to become the battalion's Honorary Colonel. The unit was thereafter popularly, but unofficially, known as "The Prince of Wales's Own".

Later Honorary Colonels included:

- Col J.L. Sleeman, CB, CMG, CBE, MVO, appointed 5 June 1935.

== External sources ==
- Mark Conrad, The British Army, 1914 (archive site)
- British Army units from 1945 on
- Commonwealth War Graves Commission
- The Drill Hall Project
- Great War Centenary Drill Halls
- Imperial War Museum, War Memorials Register
- The Long, Long Trail
- Land Forces of Britain, the Empire and Commonwealth – Regiments.org (archive site)
- Parliament.uk
- Orders of Battle at Patriot Files
- Graham Watson, The Territorial Army 1947
