= 9th Anti-Aircraft Division =

- Formation sign of the division, emblematic of its role and number.
- Active: 16 October 1940 – 30 September 1942
- Country: United Kingdom
- Branch: British Army
- Type: Anti-Aircraft Division
- Role: Air Defence
- Size: 3 Brigades
- Part of: 1 AA Corps
- Garrison/HQ: Cardiff
- Engagements: Cardiff Blitz; Swansea Blitz; Baedeker Blitz

The 9th Anti-Aircraft Division (9th AA Division) was an air defence formation of the British Army during the middle years of the Second World War. It defended South Wales and the Severn Valley during The Blitz but only had a short career.

== Mobilisation ==
The 9th Anti-Aircraft Division was one of five new divisions created on 1 November 1940 by Anti-Aircraft Command to control the expanding anti-aircraft (AA) defences of the United Kingdom. The 8th and the 9th AA Divisions were formed by splitting off parts of 5th AA Division. The 9th AA Division took over responsibility for South Wales, Gloucestershire, and Herefordshire.

The divisional headquarters (HQ) was at Cardiff and the General Officer Commanding (GOC) was Major-General Douglas Paige, MC, who had been commander, Corps Royal Artillery, of XI Corps. The division formed part of I AA Corps, which was created at the same time to cover Southern England and Wales. The existing 45th AA Brigade continued to control the whole South Wales area and report to the 5th AA Division until the end of 1940 while the 9th AA Division and 61st AA Brigade HQs were being established. (Note: Several sources mistakenly label the 61st AA Brigade as the 64th AA Brigade; the correct designation is confirmed by 79th (HY) HAA Rgt's regimental history and official AA Command Order of Battle.) 61st AA Brigade finally assumed responsibility at the beginning of February 1941.

Of the formations and units assigned to the new division, a number had served with the British Expeditionary Force in the Battle of France and had been reformed and re-equipped in the Severn Valley and West Wales after the Dunkirk evacuation. The others were mainly Territorial Army units formed locally just before the outbreak of war.

== The Blitz ==
At the time the 9th AA Division was created, the towns of South Wales, including important coal and oil port facilities, refineries, steelworks and ordnance factories, were under almost nightly air attack (the Cardiff Blitz and Swansea Blitz), to which the AA defences replied as best they could. The division's fighting units, organised into three AA Brigades, consisted of Heavy (HAA) and Light (LAA) gun units and Searchlight (S/L) units of the Royal Artillery. There were major concentrations of HAA guns in the Gun Defence Areas (GDAs) at Cardiff (covering Barry, Cardiff, and Newport) and Swansea (covering Llanelli, Port Talbot, and Swansea), LAA units were distributed to defend Vulnerable Points (VPs) such as docks and Glascoed Royal Ordnance Factory, while the S/L detachments were widely spread and crossed brigade boundaries.

The 1st Searchlight Regiment was deployed under both the 45th AA Brigade and the 61st AA Brigade to complete the 'Illuminated Area' in South Wales. The regiment assisted the AA guns of the Cardiff and Swansea GDAs and Night fighters of No. 10 Group RAF, while the S/L detachments occasionally engaged the raiders directly with their Light machine guns (LMGs). Meanwhile, the 37th (Tyne Electrical Engineers) S/L Rgt in the 5th AA Brigade had one battery operating the 'Cardiff–Newport Dazzle Area', others were at Hereford and Stonehouse, Gloucestershire, the latter also providing homing beacons for aircraft returning to RAF Colerne and RAF Moreton-in-Marsh. The latter batteries reported enemy air activity as 'slight' and 'small scale' during the winter of 1940–41, with one significant raid on Cheltenham on 11 December.

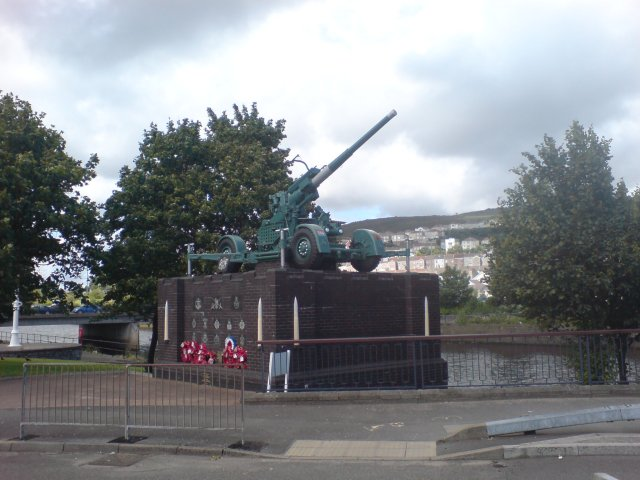
A mobile 3.7-inch gun surmounts the monument erected to the air defence of Swansea, particularly the night of 21 February 1941.

There was enemy air activity over the Bristol Channel and South Wales coast on most nights, but usually these were reconnaissances or nuisance raids, Heavier raids began against Cardiff and Swansea in January and February, 1941. The Luftwaffe began a new tactic of hitting the same towns on successive nights in an attempt to put them completely out of action. Swansea was the first town so attacked. On the night of 19/20 February the building housing both the Regimental HQ of the 79th (Hertfordshire Yeomanry) HAA Rgt and the Gun Operations Room (GOR) of the 61st AA Brigade at Swansea was destroyed by a bomb during a heavy raid. Two officers and five other ranks were killed or died of wounds, but the guns continued firing under local control and communications were maintained.

The Luftwaffe returned to continue the 'Swansea Blitz' on the nights of 20/21 and 21/22 February. On the latter night, there was confusion between the Sector Operations Room (SOR) at RAF Pembrey and the Swansea GOR, resulting in the guns ceasing fire between 20.20 and 21.10 but no night fighters arriving, leaving the town centre unprotected. Although some raiders were shot down once the restriction was lifted, the centre of Swansea was devastated, and fires and delayed-action bombs destroyed communications. The GOR had to be temporarily relocated to Neath.

By the end of February 1941, the HAA guns (3-inch and the newer 3.7-inch and 4.5-inch guns) in the Cardiff and Swansea GDAs only numbered 52 and 18 out of a planned establishment of 64 and 36 respectively. These had been increased a month later to 56 and 36, though further additions to the establishment were already being called for. The position on LAA gun sites was worse: only small numbers of Bofors 40 mm guns were available at the start of the Blitz, and most LAA detachments had to make do with LMGs.

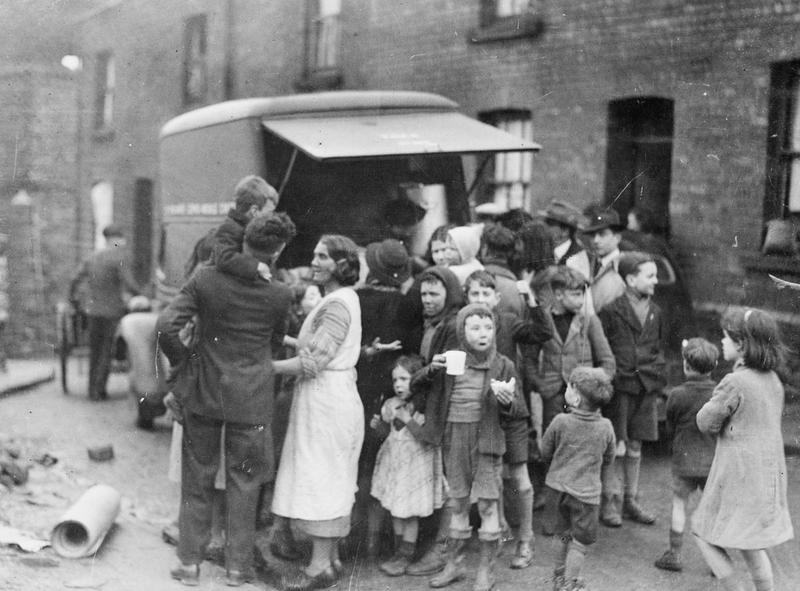
Mothers and children in a working class area of Swansea have tea and sandwiches from a mobile canteen after a night's bombing.

=== Order of Battle 1940–41 ===
The division's composition during the Blitz was as follows:

- 5th AA Brigade – from France, covering Gloucester and Hereford
  - 85th (Tees) HAA Rgt (part) – from France
  - 88th HAA Rgt (part)
  - 47th LAA Rgt – new unit formed from part of 20th LAA Rgt
  - 37th (Tyne Electrical Engineers) S/L Rgt – from France
- 45th AA Brigade – from 5th AA Division, covering Cardiff and Newport
  - 77th (Welsh) HAA Rgt
  - 85th (Tees) HAA Rgt (part)
  - 88th HAA Rgt (part)
  - 20th LAA Rgt
  - 34th LAA Rgt (part)
  - 1st S/L Rgt (part) – from France
  - 67th (Welch Regiment) S/L Rgt
- 61st AA Brigade – formed by splitting 45th AA Brigade, covering Swansea and Milford Haven
  - 79th (Hertfordshire Yeomanry) HAA Rgt – from France
  - 34th LAA Rgt (part)
  - 1st S/L Rgt (part)
- 8th AA 'Z' Regiment – new divisional unit equipped with Z Battery rocket launchers, formed in September 1940
- 9th AA Divisional Signals, Royal Corps of Signals (RCS) – formed at Cardiff
- 9th AA Divisional Royal Army Service Corps (RASC)
  - 95th Company
  - 914th Company – from 10th AA Division May 1941
- 9th AA Divisional Company, Royal Army Medical Corps (RAMC)
- 9th AA Divisional Workshop Company, Royal Army Ordnance Corps (RAOC)

== Mid-War ==
After a busy period for the AA defences of South Wales in early May 1941, the Blitz effectively ended in the middle of the month. Desultory raiding continued through June and July while the gaps in AA defences were filled as more equipment and units became available. Searchlights, now assisted by Searchlight Control (SLC) radar, were reorganised, with a 'Killer Belt' established between the Cardiff and Bristol (the 8th AA Division) GDAs to cooperate closely with RAF night fighters. The HAA and support units increasingly became 'Mixed', indicating that women of the Auxiliary Territorial Service (ATS) were fully integrated into them. At the same time, experienced units were posted away to train for service overseas (sometimes being lent back to AA Command while awaiting embarkation). This led to a continual turnover of units, which accelerated in 1942 with the preparations for the invasion of North Africa (Operation Torch) and the need to transfer AA units to counter the Luftwaffe's Baedeker Blitz against largely unprotected towns and hit-and-run daylight attacks against South Coast towns.

In June 1942, the 5th AA Brigade HQ was transferred to the 5th AA Division defending the South Coast and was replaced by the 67th AA Brigade HQ from the 11th AA Division in the West Midlands. On 27 July 1942, the lights of the 37th S/L Rgt were engaged during a Baedeker raid on Cheltenham.

=== Order of Battle 1941–42 ===
During this period the division was composed as follows:

- 5th AA Brigade – to the 5th AA Division June 1942
  - 52nd (London) HAA Rgt – from the 61st AA Brigade January 1942; left AA Command February 1942; to Ceylon
  - 58th (Kent) HAA Rgt – from the 6th AA Division Autumn 1941; to the 4th AA Division by May 1942
  - 85th (Tees) HAA Rgt – to the 6th AA Division Autumn 1941
  - 143rd (Mixed) HAA Rgt – new unit formed January 1942; to the 67th AA Brigade June 1942
  - 34th LAA Rgt – from the 5th AA Division (formerly the 61st AA Brigade) March 1942; to the 6th AA Division April 1942
  - 47th LAA Rgt – to the 8th AA Division Autumn 1941
  - 77th LAA Rgt – new unit joined Summer 1941; left AA Command February 1942; to India
  - 112th (Durham Light Infantry) LAA Rgt – converted from the 47th (DLI) S/L Rgt, joined before May 1942, to the 61st AA Brigade May 1942
  - 37th (TEE) S/L/ Rgt
- 45th AA Brigade
  - 77th (Welsh) HAA Rgt – left UK December 1941, captured in Java March 1942
  - 79th (Hertfordshire Yeomanry) HAA Rgt – returned from the 8th AA Division August 1942; then mobilised and left AA Command; later to Operation Torch
  - 112th HAA Rgt – from the 8th AA Division July 1941; to the 61st AA Brigade May 1942
  - 118th HAA Rgt – new unit formed December 1940
  - 20th LAA Rgt – began mobilisation as Defended Ports unit August 1941; to the 3rd AA Division December 1941
  - 44th LAA Rgt – from the 8th AA Division Autumn 1941; unbrigaded by end 1941; to India 1942
  - 55th (Devon) LAA Rgt – returned from Norwegian Campaign, part of GHQ Reserve lent to AA Command; left UK November 1941, to Ceylon 1942
  - 72nd LAA Rgt – from the 3rd AA Division before May 1942; to the 8th AA Division May 1942
  - 112th (DLI) LAA Rgt – from the 61st AA Brigade Summer 1942; later to India
  - 37th (TEE) S/L Rgt – from the 67th AA Brigade August 1942
  - 67th (Welch) S/L Rgt
  - 8th AA 'Z' Rgt – to the 61st AA Brigade Autumn 1941; returned August 1942
  - 12th AA 'Z' Rgt – from the 8th AA Division June 1941; to the 6th AA Division Autumn 1941

61st AA Brigade

  - 52nd (London) HAA Rgt – joined Summer 1941; to the 5th AA Brigade January 1942
  - 57th (Wessex) HAA Rgt – From the 11th AA Division May 1942; to Eighth Army June 1942
  - 79th (Hertfordshire Yeomanry) HAA Rgt – to the 8th AA Division June 1942
  - 112th HAA Rgt – from the 45th AA Brigade May 1942
  - 120th HAA Rgt – new unit formed January 1941; to the 1st AA Division Autumn 1941
  - 138th HAA Rgt – new unit formed November 1941; to the 67th AA Brigade August 1942
  - 34th LAA Rgt – to the 5th AA Division Autumn 1941
  - 50th LAA Rgt – joined June 1942
  - 80th LAA Rgt – from the 5th AA Division December 1941; left AA Command April 1942, later to Ninth Army
  - 112th (DLI) LAA Rgt – from the 5th AA Brigade May 1942; to the 45th AA Brigade Summer 1942
  - 1st S/L Rgt – to the 6th AA Division January 1942
  - 77th S/L Rgt – joined by May 1941
  - 8th AA 'Z' Rgt – from the 45th AA Brigade Autumn 1941; returned August 1942
- 67th AA Brigade – from the 11th AA Division June 1942
  - 119th HAA Rgt – from the 8th AA Division June 1942
  - 138th HAA Rgt – from the 61st AA Brigade August 1942
  - 143rd (Mixed) HAA Rgt – from the 5th AA Brigade June 1942
  - 87th LAA Rgt – from the 8th AA Division June 1942; to unbrigaded July 1942
  - 135th LAA Rgt – from the 8th AA Division July 1942
  - 37th (TEE) S/L Rgt – from the 5th AA Brigade June 1942; to the 45th AA Brigade August 1942

The increased sophistication of Operations Rooms and communications was reflected in the growth in support units, which attained the following organisation by June 1942:

- 9th AA Division Mixed Signal Unit HQ, RCS
  - HQ No 1 Company
    - 9th AA Division Mixed Signal Office Section
    - 314th GOR Mixed Signal Section (Gloucester)
    - 67th AA Brigade Signal Office Mixed Sub-Section
    - 411th GOR Mixed Signal Section (Cardiff)
    - 45th AA Brigade Signal Office Mixed Sub-Section
    - 338th GOR Mixed Signal Section (Swindon)
    - 22nd AA Line Maintenance Section
    - 32nd AA Sub-Gun Operations Room Mixed Signal Sub-Section
  - HQ No 2 Company
    - 317th GOR Mixed Signal Section (Swansea)
    - 61st AA Brigade Signal Office Mixed Sub-Section
    - 121st RAF Fighter Sector Sub-Section (Fairwood Common)
    - 319th GOR Mixed Signal Section (Milford Haven)
    - 23rd AA Line Maintenance Section
- HQ 9th AA Divisional RASC
  - 95th, 914th Companies
- 9th AA Divisional RAMC
- 9th AA Divisional Workshop Company, RAOC
- 9th AA Divisional Radio Maintenance Company, RAOC
- 3rd AA Tractor Bty

The RAOC companies became part of the new Royal Electrical and Mechanical Engineers (REME) during 1942.

== Disbandment ==
A reorganisation of AA Command in October 1942 saw the AA divisions disbanded and replaced by a smaller number of AA Groups more closely aligned with the groups of RAF Fighter Command. The 9th AA Division re-merged with the 5th and the 8th AA Divisions into the 3rd AA Group based at Bristol and cooperating with No. 10 Group RAF.

== General Officer Commanding ==
The following officer commanded 9th AA Division:

- Major-General Douglas Paige, MC (16 November 1940 – 30 September 1942, retired)

== External sources ==
- Anti-Aircraft Command (1940) at British Military History
- Generals of World War II
- Royal Artillery 1939–1945
