= The Bulwarks, Porthkerry =

Hillfort in the Vale of Glamorgan, Wales

- The Bulwarks, Porthceri
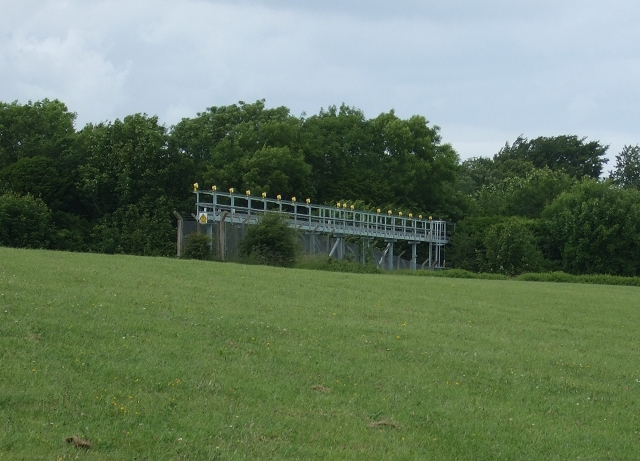
- Approach lights for Cardiff Airport runway 30 in the north section of the Bulwarks fort

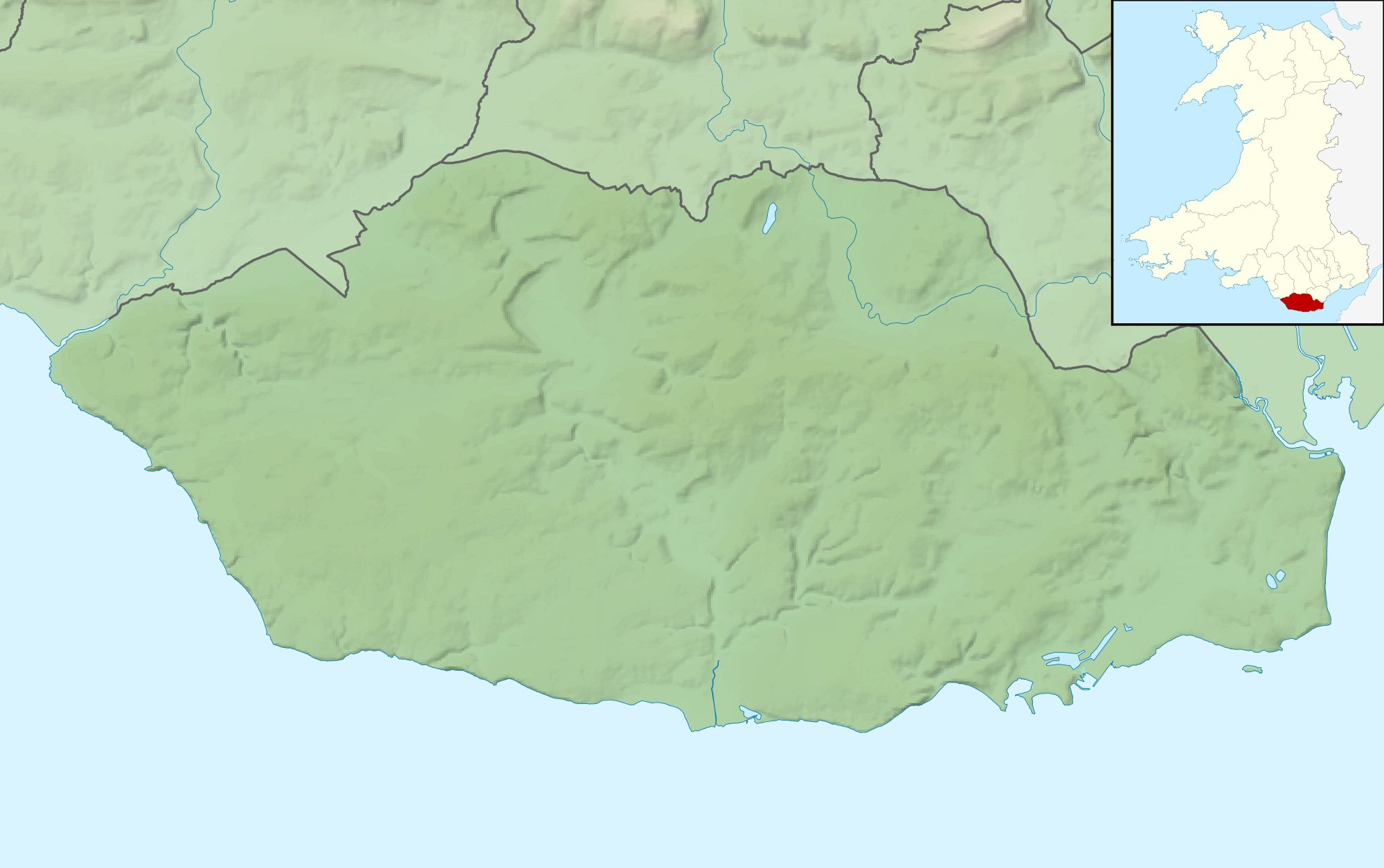
- Location within Vale of Glamorgan
- 51.388595°N 3.321514°W
- Type: Promontory fort
- Location: Rhoose, Vale of Glamorgan
- Region: Wales

History
- Built: Iron Age

Site notes
- Length: 230 metres (750 ft)
- Width: 120 to 250 metres (390 to 820 ft)
- Area: 4.1 hectares (10 acres)
- Condition: Overgrown
- Public access: Yes

Designations
- Designation: NPRN 93015; ST 082664

The Bulwarks, Porthkerry is a promontory fort in Rhoose, Vale of Glamorgan, on the southern coast of Wales overlooking the Bristol Channel. It probably dates to the Iron Age and continued to be occupied during the Roman period in Britain. The ramparts and ditches along the west side are well preserved, but the fortifications are heavily overgrown.

== Location ==
The Iron Age fortification is one of several along the southern coast of Wales. The site was a strategically important position overlooking the Bristol Channel. The fort is on the end of a spur that faces west and overlooked the Porthkerry creek, now silted up. The natural slopes are very steep on the south east and north, but the ground is almost level towards the west. The south side is now bounded by the edge of the cliff along the shore, but probably there was originally a fortification along this side, since eroded away. The ramparts enclose an area of about 4 hectares (9.9 acres). The fort is accessible via the Porthkerry caravan park.

== Fortification ==
The Bulwarks enclosure is trapezoidal in shape. At present it is about 230 metres (750 ft) from north to south, 250 metres (820 ft) along the north side and 120 metres (390 ft) along the south side. The cliff bounding the fort today has a recession rate of 24.2 centimetres (9.5 in) annually. Erosion along the south side has probably removed a strip about 120 metres (390 ft) wide and 1 hectare (2.5 acres) in area.

The defence consisted of three close-set banks separated by ditches. On the west the banks and ditches are well-preserved and about 50 metres (160 ft) wide in total. On the other two sides only terraces remain where the defences once ran. The fort appears to have had just one entrance in the middle of the west side, at a slightly oblique angle to the rampart line, with gaps in the ramparts and causeways across the ditches. The interior is almost level and about 60 metres (200 ft) above O.D.

== History ==
Limited excavations indicate that the Bulwarks fort was occupied from the Iron Age into the Roman era. The camp was probably first occupied around 200 BC to 75 AD, before the Romans arrived in South Wales. Of the pottery remains from the military and then civilian occupation of the site, 26.7% is South-East Dorset Black Burnished Category I Pottery.

In 1968 F. L. Davies excavated the site for the Department of the Environment. He found traces of three rectangular buildings just inside the innermost west rampart. Of these successive timber buildings, the earliest may have been pre-Roman. The second was occupied from the late first century AD to the mid second century AD, then burned down. After this the site was covered in a layer of Lias limestone rubble, then a third rectangular building was erected, 10 feet (3.0 m) wide and at least 30 feet (9.1 m) long, with a porch and doorway in the south west corner. The third building seems to have been occupied until the late third century or the fourth century AD.

The defensive walls are now covered in thick vegetation. The fort is scheduled as an ancient monument by the Ministry of Public Building and Works.

== Sources ==
- Allen, J. R. L.; Fulford, M. G. (1996), "The Distribution of South-East Dorset Black Burnished Category I Pottery in South-West Britain", Britannia, 27, Society for the Promotion of Roman Studies, JSTOR 527045
- Cunliffe, Barry W. (1991), Iron Age Communities in Britain: An Account of England, Scotland, and Wales from the Seventh Century BC Until the Roman Conquest, Psychology Press, ISBN 978-0-415-05416-4
- Loveluck-Edwards, Graham, The History of the Village of Porthkerry, The Parish of Porthkerry and Rhoose, archived from the original on 13 August 2020
- "Porthkerry – The Bulwarks" (PDF), Vale of Glamorgan County Treasures - Rhoose, Vale of Glamorgan Council, 2007
- Royal Commission on the Ancient and Historical Monuments of Wales (1976), An Inventory of the Ancient Monuments in Glamorgan: Pre-Norman. Part II The Iron Age and Roman Occupation, Royal Commission on the Ancient and Historical Monuments of Wales, ISBN 978-0-11-700589-1
- The Bulwarks Camp Portkerry, Ministry of Public Building and Works
- Trenhaile, A. S. (July 1972), "The Shore Platforms of the Vale of Glamorgan, Wales", Transactions of the Institute of British Geographers, 56, The Royal Geographical Society (with the Institute of British Geographers), JSTOR 621545
- Wilson, D. R.; Wright, R. P. (1969), "Roman Britain in 1968: I. Sites Explored: II. Inscriptions", The Journal of Roman Studies, 59 (1/2), Society for the Promotion of Roman Studies, JSTOR 299854
