= Cardiff Blitz =

World War II aerial bombardment

- Part of the Strategic bombing campaign of World War II
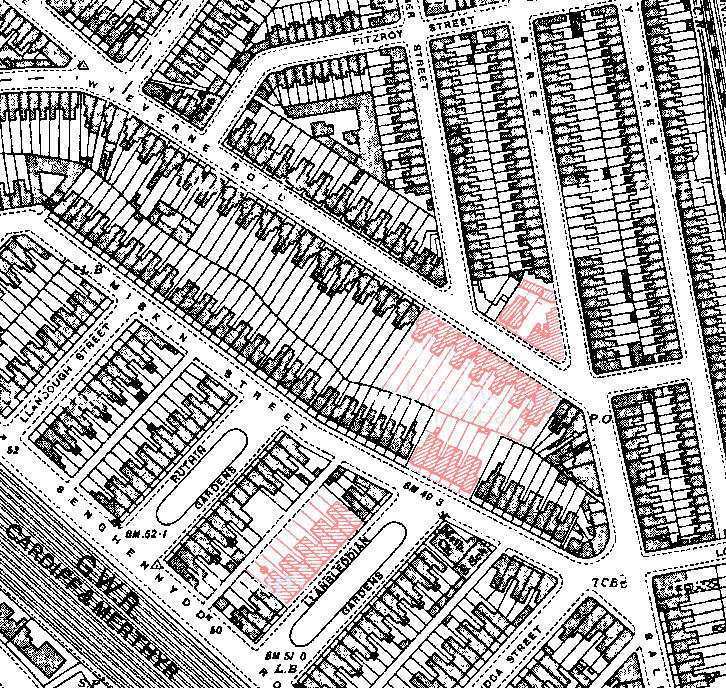
- Area of damage caused in Cathays by two parachute landmines killing 23
Date	1940–1944
Location	Cardiff, Wales
Result	Cardiff damaged by German air raids

Belligerents
Nazi Germany	United Kingdom

Casualties and losses
Unknown	355

The Cardiff Blitz (Welsh: Blitz Caerdydd); refers to the bombing of Cardiff, Wales during World War II. Between 1940 and the final raid on the city in March 1944 approximately 2,100 bombs fell, killing 355 people.

Cardiff Docks became a strategic bombing target for German Luftwaffe (the Nazi German air force) as it was one of the biggest coal ports in the world. Consequently, it and the surrounding area were heavily bombed. Llandaff Cathedral, amongst many other civilian buildings caught in the raids, was damaged by the bombing in 1941.

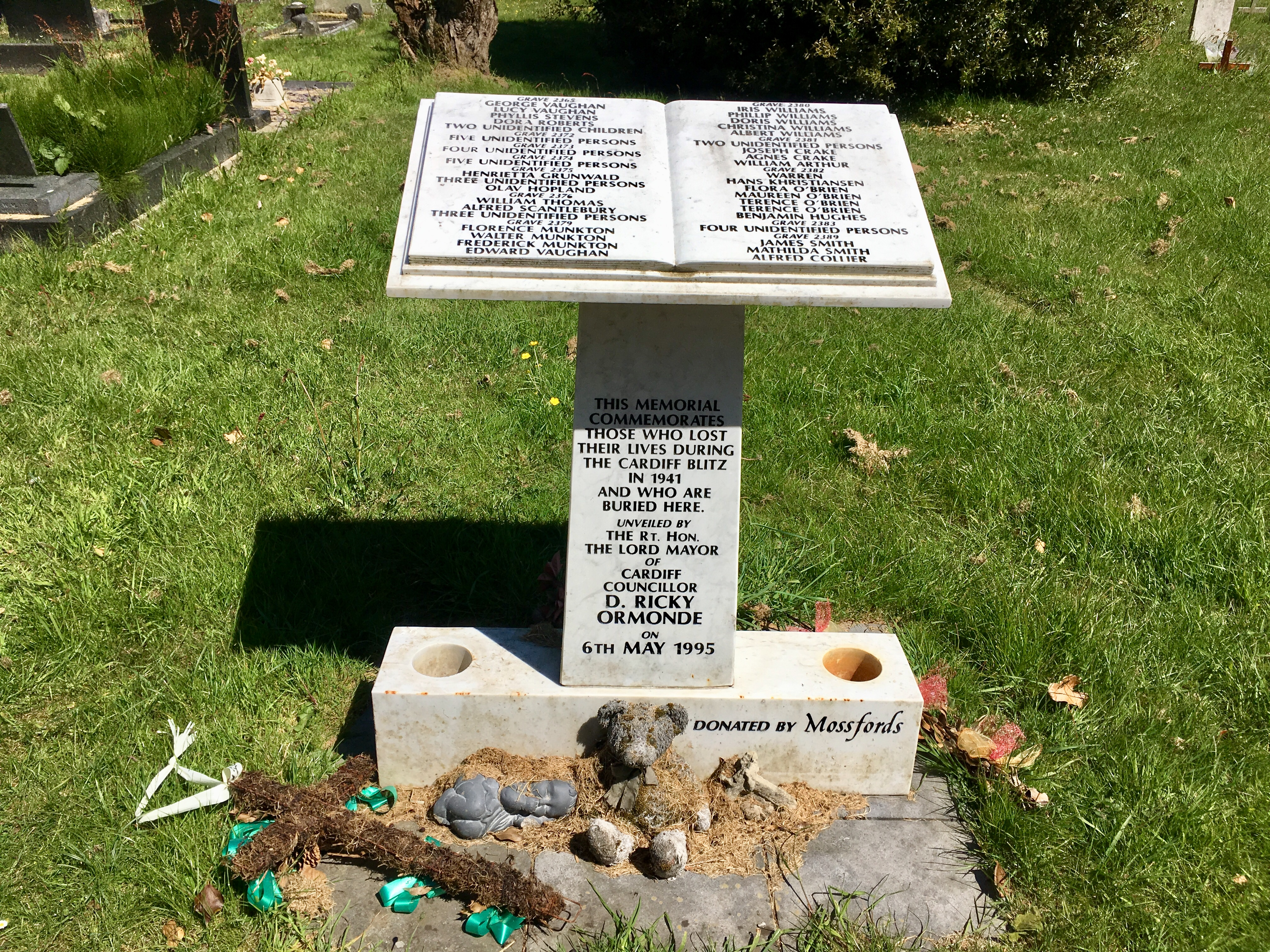
Memorial to the victims of the Cardiff Blitz in Cathays Cemetery

== Bombing raids ==
=== 1940–41 ===
During 1940 the Luftwaffe targeted Cardiff on 3, 10 and 12 July and 7 August. This was followed in 1941 with raids on 2, 3 and 10 January. Over 100 bombers attacked the city over a 10-hour period beginning at 6.37 pm on the night of 2 January 1941. Dropping high explosive bombs, incendiary bombs and parachute mines, the Riverside area was the first to be bombed. In Grangetown, the Hollyman Brothers bakery was hit by a parachute mine and 32 people who were using the basement as a shelter were killed. When the raid was over 165 people had been killed and 427 more injured, while nearly 350 homes were destroyed or had to be demolished.

Chapels and the nave of Llandaff Cathedral were also damaged. Western Cardiff was the worst hit area, particularly Canton and Riverside, where 116 people were killed, an estimated 50 of which were killed in one street in Riverside, De Burgh Street. The 10-hour air raid had started at 18:37 and Grangetown was the first area to be hit by 100 German aircraft.

Further raids followed on 27 February, through 1, 4, 12, 20 March and 3, 12, 29, 30 April and 4 to 11 May.

The raid of 29 April 1941 did not have the usual precursory flares or incendiaries and instead four land mines, probably intended for the Civic Centre, were parachuted without warning soon after the siren sounded. One landed harmlessly in the Castle grounds, narrowly missing the Civic shelter, but the other three had tragic consequences. Ten died in Lewis Street in Riverside from one mine. The other two fell in Cathays on Llanbleddian Gardens and Wyverne Road, killing 23 people. This included ten members of the Palmer family who had taken cover in the Anderson Shelter in their back garden. The adjoining parish hall on Wyverne Road was destroyed, but remarkably the 4th Cardiff Scout flag, carried to the Antarctic on Scott's fateful expedition, was recovered from the rubble undamaged. Cathays Cemetery had damage from a number of bombs and a landmine.

=== 1942–44 ===
In 1942 fewer raids occurred but two occurred on 30 June and 2 July. In 1943 some of the last raids occurred on 7 May and 17–18 May, the raid on 17 May, believed by the British press to be in retaliation for the Dambusters' raid, hit the railway station, and a 1,200-pound (540 kg) unexploded bomb threatened to stop rail traffic.

On the final raid, one of the bombers mistook the Irish Sea for the River Severn and bombed Cork in Ireland.

== See also ==
- Timeline of World War II (1940)
- Cardiff Castle
- Firing Line: Cardiff Castle Museum of the Welsh Soldier
