= Sunderland Blitz =

Bombing of Sunderland during World War II

The Sunderland Blitz was a bombing campaign by the German Luftwaffe against the British city of Sunderland during the larger bombing campaign of Britain from 1940 to 1943. Sunderland was an important ship building city and port during World War II. 273 civilians were killed and 838 injured during the bombing. Bombing of the city began on 21 June 1940 and ended on 24 May 1943. An estimated 90% of the city's buildings were damaged, and 1,000 destroyed. The worst raids happened on 14 and 24 May 1943 when 152 people were killed and 512 injured.
