= The Blitz =

1940–41 bombing of Britain during WWII

- Part of the strategic bombing campaign and Battle of Britain of World War II
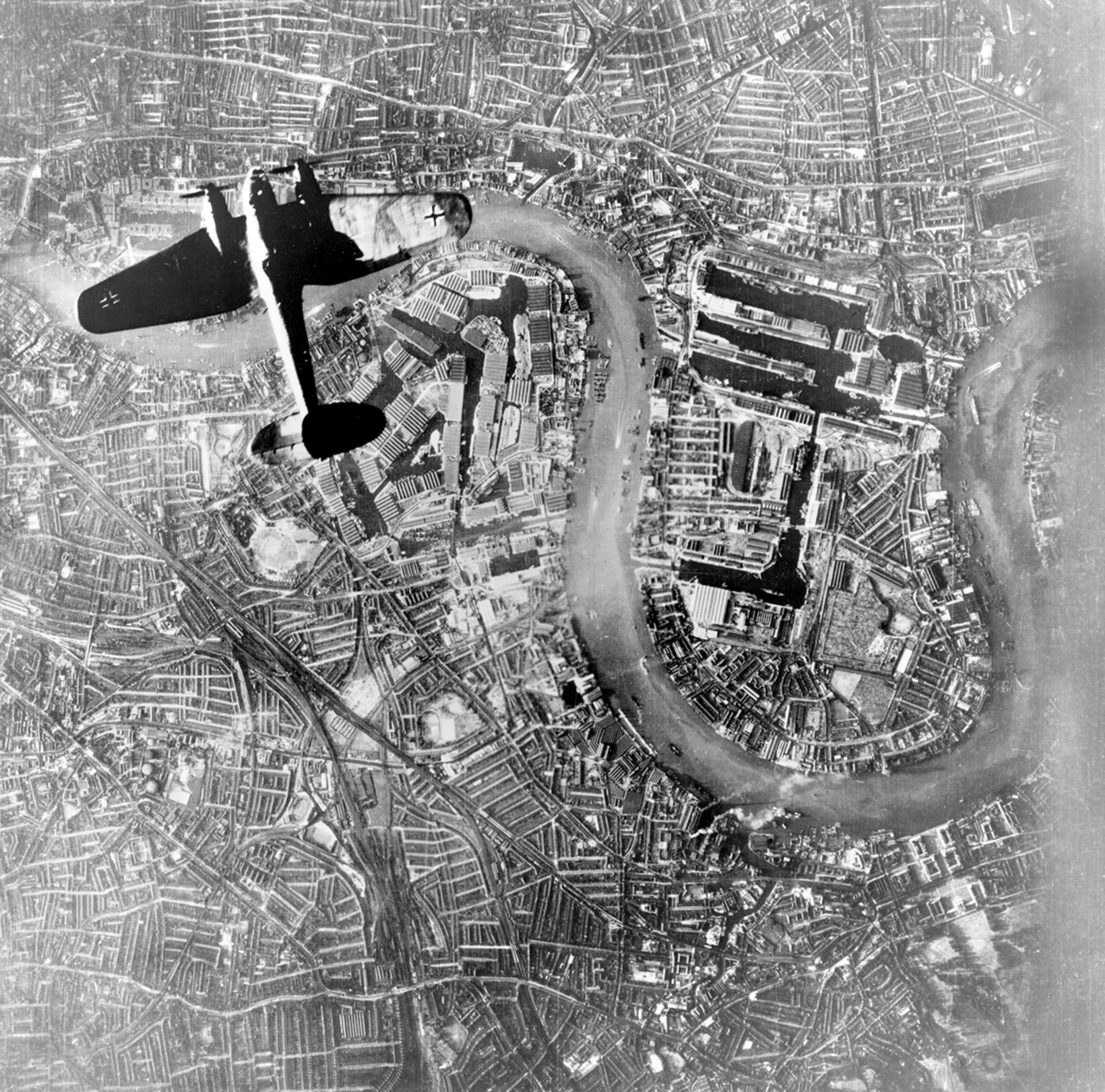
- A Heinkel He 111 bomber over the Surrey Commercial Docks in South London and Wapping and the Isle of Dogs in the East End of London on 7 September 1940
Date	7 September 1940 – 16 May 1941 (8 months, 10 days)
Location	United Kingdom
Result	Axis strategic failure

Belligerents
United Kingdom	Germany Italy

Commanders and leaders
(United Kingdom) King George VI; (United Kingdom) Winston Churchill; (United Kingdom) Hugh Dowding; (United Kingdom) Frederick Alfred Pile; (United Kingdom) Owen Tudor Boyd; (United Kingdom) Leslie Gossage	(Nazi Germany) Adolf Hitler; (Nazi Germany) Hermann Göring; (Nazi Germany) Hugo Sperrle; (Nazi Germany) Albert Kesselring; (Nazi Germany) Hans Jeschonnek; (Fascist Italy) Rino Corso Fougier

Casualties and losses
c. 40,000–43,000 civilians killed; c. 46,000–139,000 injured; Two million houses damaged or destroyed (60 percent of these in London)	Unknown; 3,363 aircrew; 2,265 aircraft (summer 1940 – May 1941)

The Blitz was a bombing campaign by Nazi Germany and Fascist Italy against the United Kingdom during the Second World War. It lasted for eight months, from 7 September 1940 to 16 May 1941. The name is a shortened form of Blitzkrieg (English: "lightning war"), a term used in the popular press to describe a German style of surprise attack used during the war.

Toward the end of the Battle of Britain in 1940, daylight air superiority over the United Kingdom was contested between the Luftwaffe and the Royal Air Force. Germany began conducting mass air attacks against British cities, beginning with London, in an attempt to draw the RAF Fighter Command into a battle of annihilation. Adolf Hitler and Reichsmarschall Hermann Göring, commander-in-chief of the Luftwaffe, ordered the new policy on 6 September 1940. From 7 September 1940, London was systematically bombed by the Luftwaffe for 56 of the following 57 days and nights. The attacks included a large daylight attack against London on 15 September, a large raid on 29 December 1940 against London resulting in a firestorm known as the Second Great Fire of London, and a large raid on the night of 10–11 May 1941.

The Luftwaffe gradually decreased daylight operations in favour of night attacks to evade attacks by the RAF, and the Blitz became a night bombing campaign after October 1940. The Luftwaffe attacked the main Atlantic seaport of Liverpool in the Liverpool Blitz. The North Sea port of Hull, a convenient and easily found target or secondary target for bombers unable to locate their primary targets, suffered the Hull Blitz. The port cities of Bristol, Cardiff, Portsmouth, Plymouth, Southampton, Sunderland, Swansea, Belfast and Glasgow also were bombed, as were the industrial centres of Birmingham, Coventry, Manchester and Sheffield. More than 40,000 civilians were killed by Luftwaffe bombing during the war, almost half of them in the capital, where more than a million houses were destroyed or damaged.

In early July 1940, the German High Command began planning Operation Barbarossa, the invasion of the Soviet Union. Bombing failed to demoralise the British into surrender or do much damage to the war economy; eight months of bombing never seriously hampered British war production, which continued to increase. The greatest effect was to force the British to disperse the production of aircraft and spare parts. British wartime studies concluded that most cities took 10 to 15 days to recover when hit severely, although some, such as Birmingham, took three months.

The German air offensive and regime change operation failed because the Luftwaffe High Command (Oberkommando der Luftwaffe, OKL) did not develop a methodical strategy for destroying British war industry. Poor intelligence about British industry and economic efficiency led to the OKL concentrating on tactics, rather than strategy. The bombing effort was diluted by attacks against several sets of industries instead of constant pressure on those most vital to the British war effort.

== Background information ==
=== Luftwaffe and strategic bombing ===
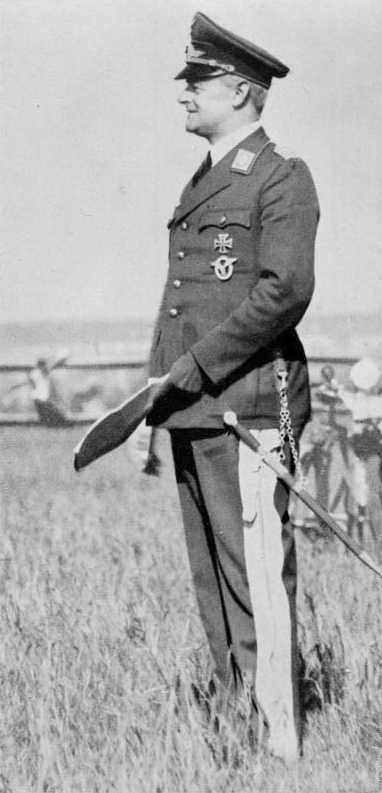
General Walther Wever

In the 1920s and 1930s airpower theorists such as Giulio Douhet and Billy Mitchell (Note: Mitchell was a prominent member of a group of American theorists often referred to as "The Bomber Mafia". They were responsible for the development of American strategic bombing doctrine, and the separation of the U.S. Army Air Forces from the U.S. Army, into the U.S Air Force.) claimed that air forces could win wars, obviating the need for land and sea combat. It was thought that "the bomber will always get through", and could not be resisted, particularly at night. Industry, seats of government and communications could be destroyed, depriving an opponent of the means to make war. Bombing civilians would cause a collapse of morale, and a loss of production in the remaining factories. Democracies, where public opinion was allowed, were thought particularly vulnerable. The Royal Air Force (RAF) and the United States Army Air Corps (USAAC) adopted much of this apocalyptic thinking. The policy of RAF Bomber Command became an attempt to achieve victory through the destruction of civilian will, communications and industry.

The Luftwaffe took a cautious view of strategic bombing, but the OKL did not oppose the strategic bombardment of industries or cities. It believed it could greatly affect the balance of power on the battlefield by disrupting production and damaging civilian morale. OKL did not believe air power alone could be decisive, and the Luftwaffe did not adopt an official policy of the deliberate bombing of civilians until 1942.

The vital industries and transport centres that would be targeted for shutdown were valid military targets. It could be claimed civilians were not to be targeted directly, but the breakdown of production would affect their morale and will to fight. German legal scholars of the 1930s carefully worked out guidelines for what type of bombing was permissible under international law. While direct attacks against civilians were ruled out as "terror bombing", the concept of attacking vital war industries—and probable heavy civilian casualties and breakdown of civilian morale—was ruled as acceptable.

From the beginning of the Nazi regime until 1939, there was a debate in German military journals over the role of strategic bombardment, with some contributors arguing along the lines of the British and Americans. General Walther Wever (Chief of the Luftwaffe General Staff 1 March 1935 – 3 June 1936) championed strategic bombing, and the building of suitable aircraft, although he emphasised the importance of aviation in operational and tactical terms. Wever outlined five points of air strategy:

1. To destroy the enemy air force by bombing its bases and aircraft factories, and defeat enemy air forces that attacked German targets.
2. To prevent the movement of large enemy ground forces to the decisive areas, by destroying railways and roads, particularly bridges and tunnels, which are indispensable for the movement and supply of forces
3. To support the operations of the army formations, independent of railways, i.e., armoured forces and motorised forces, by impeding the enemy's advance, and participating directly in ground operations.
4. To support naval operations by attacking naval bases, protecting German naval bases and participating directly in naval battles
5. To paralyse the enemy armed forces, by stopping production in armaments factories.

Wever argued that OKL should not be solely educated in tactical and operational matters, but also in grand strategy, war economics, armament production, and the mentality of potential opponents (also known as intelligence analysis). Wever's vision was not realised, staff studies in those subjects fell by the wayside, and the Air Academies focused on tactics, technology and operational planning, rather than on independent strategic air offensives.

In 1936 Wever died in an air crash, and the failure to implement his vision for the new Luftwaffe was largely attributable to his successors. Ex-army personnel, and his successors as Chief of the Luftwaffe General Staff, Albert Kesselring (3 June 1936 – 31 May 1937) and Hans-Jürgen Stumpff (1 June 1937 – 31 January 1939), are usually blamed for abandoning strategic planning for close air support.

Two prominent enthusiasts for ground-support operations (direct or indirect) were Hugo Sperrle, the commander of Luftflotte 3 (1 February 1939 – 23 August 1944), and Hans Jeschonnek, Chief of the Luftwaffe General Staff (1 February 1939 – 19 August 1943). The Luftwaffe was not pressed into ground support operations, either because of pressure from the army, or because it was led by ex-soldiers; indeed, the Luftwaffe favoured a model of joint inter-service operations, rather than independent strategic air campaigns.

=== Hitler, Göring, and air power ===
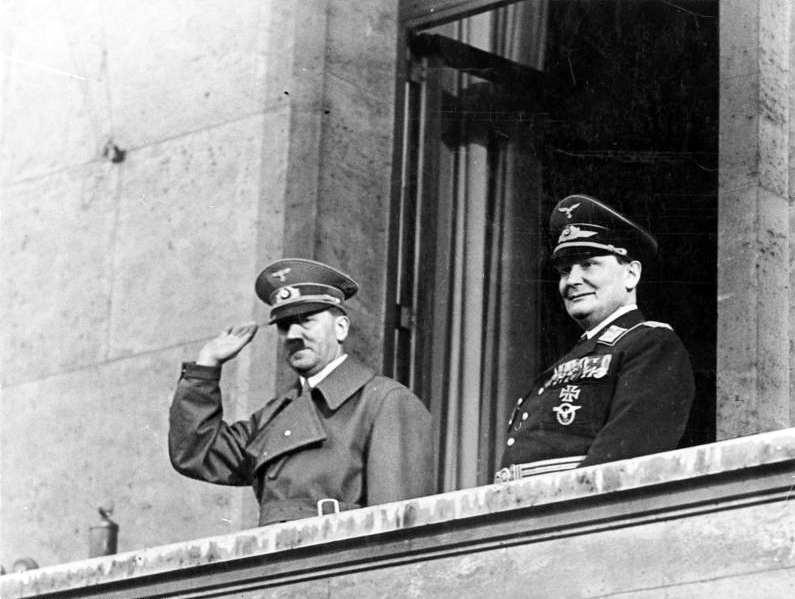
Hitler and Göring, March 1938

Hitler paid less attention to the bombing of opponents than to air defence, although he promoted the development of a bomber force in the 1930s, and understood it was possible to use bombers for strategic purposes. He told OKL in 1939 that ruthless employment of the Luftwaffe against the heart of the British will to resist, would follow when the moment was right. Hitler quickly developed scepticism toward strategic bombing, confirmed by the results of the Blitz. He frequently complained of the Luftwaffe's inability to damage industries sufficiently, saying, "The munitions industry cannot be impeded effectively by air raids ... usually, the prescribed targets are not hit".

While the war was being planned, Hitler never insisted upon the Luftwaffe planning a strategic bombing campaign, and did not even give ample warning to the air staff that war with Britain (or even Russia) was a possibility. The amount of firm operational and tactical preparation for a bombing campaign was minimal, largely because of the failure by Hitler, as supreme commander, to insist upon such a commitment.

Ultimately, Hitler was trapped within his own vision of bombing as a terror weapon (formed in the 1930s when he threatened smaller nations into accepting German rule, rather than suffering air bombardment). This had important implications. It showed the extent to which Hitler mistook Allied strategy for one of morale breaking, instead of one of economic warfare—and any damage to morale as a bonus.

Hitler was much more attracted to the political aspects of bombing. As the mere threat of it had produced diplomatic results in the 1930s, he expected that the threat of German retaliation would persuade the Allies to adopt a policy of moderation, and not to begin a policy of unrestricted bombing. His hope was—for reasons of political prestige within Germany itself—that the German population would be protected from the Allied bombings. When this proved impossible, he began to fear that popular feeling would turn against his regime, and redoubled efforts to mount a similar "terror offensive" against Britain, in order to produce a stalemate, in which both sides would hesitate to use bombing at all.

A major problem in the management of the Luftwaffe was Göring. Hitler believed the Luftwaffe was "the most effective strategic weapon", and in reply to repeated requests from the Kriegsmarine, for control over naval aircraft, he insisted, "We should never have been able to hold our own in this war, if we had not had an undivided Luftwaffe". Such principles made it much harder to integrate the air force into the overall strategy and produced in Göring a jealous and damaging defense of his "empire" while removing Hitler voluntarily from the systematic direction of the Luftwaffe at either the strategic or operational level.

When Hitler tried to intervene more in the running of the air force later in the war, he was faced with a political conflict of his own making, between himself and Göring, which was not fully resolved until the war was almost over. In 1940 and 1941, Göring's refusal to co-operate with the Kriegsmarine denied the entire Wehrmacht military forces of the Reich the chance to strangle British sea communications, which might have had a strategic, or decisive, effect in the war against the British Empire.

The deliberate separation of the Luftwaffe from the rest of the military structure encouraged the emergence of a major "communications gap" between Hitler and the Luftwaffe; other factors helped to exacerbate this. For one thing, Göring's fear of Hitler led him to falsify or misrepresent what information was available in the direction of an uncritical and over-optimistic interpretation of air strength. When Göring decided against continuing Wever's original heavy bomber programme, in 1937, the Reichsmarschall's own explanation was that Hitler wanted to know only how many bombers there were, and not how many engines each had. In July 1939 Göring arranged a display of the Luftwaffe's most advanced equipment at Rechlin, to give the impression the air force was more prepared for a strategic air war than was actually the case.

=== Battle of Britain ===
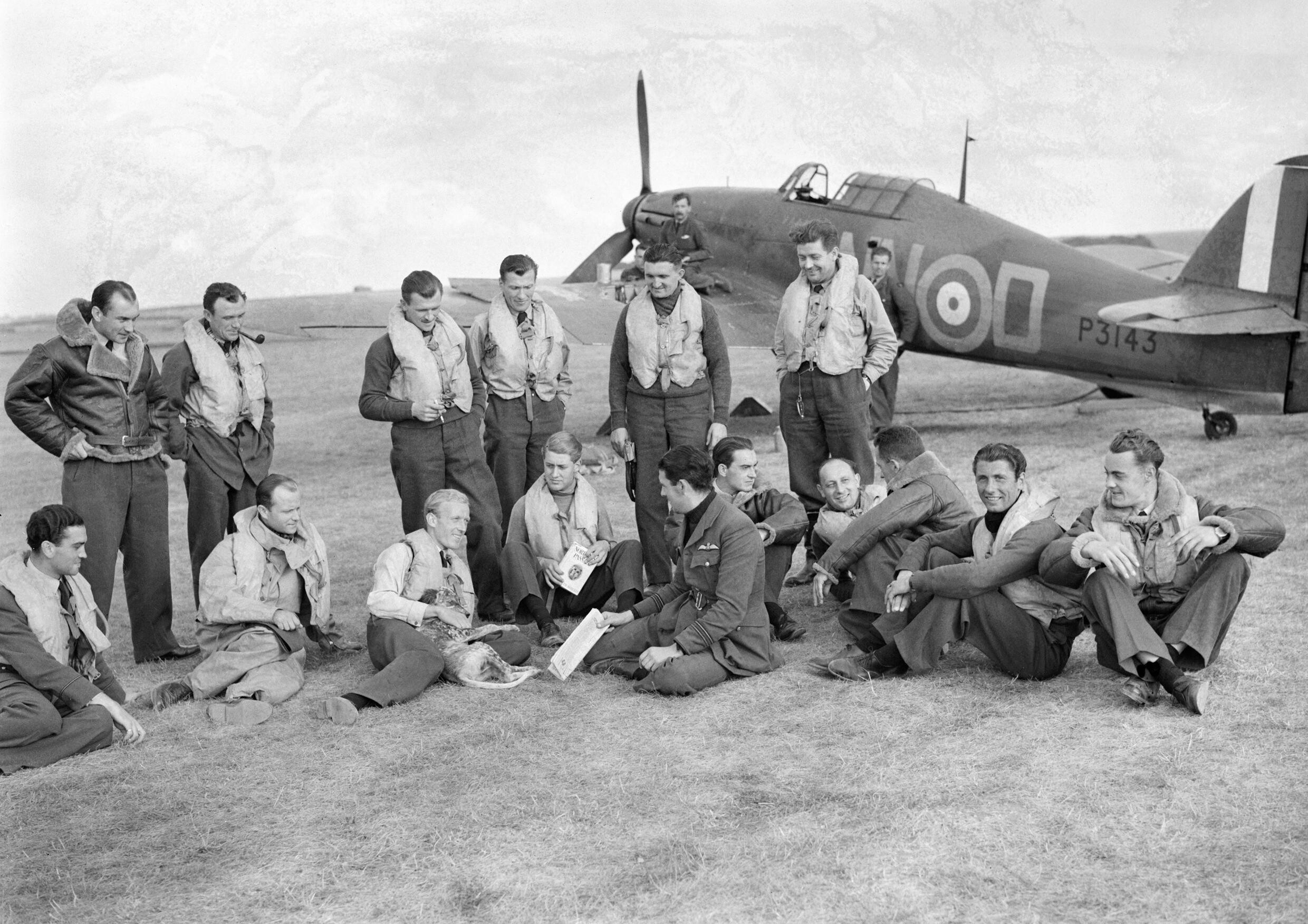
RAF pilots with one of their Hawker Hurricanes, October 1940

Although not specifically prepared to conduct independent strategic air operations against an opponent, the Luftwaffe was expected to do this over Britain. From July until September 1940 the Luftwaffe attacked Fighter Command, to gain air superiority as a prelude to invasion. This involved the bombing of English Channel convoys, ports, and RAF airfields and supporting industries. Destroying RAF Fighter Command was thought to allow the Germans control of the skies over the invasion area. It was supposed Bomber Command, Coastal Command, and the Royal Navy could not operate under conditions of German air superiority.

The weakness of the Luftwaffe's intelligence meant that their aircraft were too often unable to locate their targets, so that attacks on factories and airfields failed to achieve the desired results. British fighter aircraft production continued at a rate surpassing Germany's, during the Battle of Britain, by 2 to 1. The British produced 10,000 aircraft in 1940, in comparison to Germany's 8,000. The replacement of pilots and aircrew was more difficult. Both the RAF and Luftwaffe struggled to replace manpower losses (though the Germans had larger reserves of trained aircrew).

The circumstances hampered the Germans more than the British: Operating over home territory, British aircrew could fly again, if they survived being shot down. German crews (even if they survived) faced capture. Moreover, the Reich's bombers carried four to five crew, representing a greater loss of manpower. On 7 September the Germans shifted away from the destruction of the RAF's supporting structures. German intelligence suggested Fighter Command was weakening, and that an attack on London would force it into a final battle of annihilation, while compelling the British Government into surrender.

The decision to change strategy is sometimes claimed to have been a major mistake by OKL, argued that persisting with attacks on RAF airfields might have won air superiority for the Luftwaffe. Others argue that the Luftwaffe made little impression on Fighter Command, in the last week of August and first week of September, and that the shift in strategy was not decisive. It also has been argued that it was doubtful the Luftwaffe could have won air superiority, before the "weather window" began to deteriorate (in October).

It also was possible, if RAF losses became severe, that they could pull out to the north, wait for the German invasion, then redeploy southward again. Other historians argue that the outcome of the air battle was irrelevant; the massive numerical superiority of British naval forces and the inherent weakness of the Kriegsmarine would have made the projected German invasion, Unternehmen Seelöwe (Operation Sea Lion), a disaster, with or without German air superiority.

=== Change in strategy ===
Regardless of the ability of the Luftwaffe to win air superiority, Hitler was frustrated by its slow advance. With no sign of the RAF weakening, and the Luftflotten suffering many losses, OKL was keen for a change in strategy. To reduce losses further, strategy changed to prefer night raids, darkness offering the bombers greater protection. (Note: Williamson Murray's Strategy for Defeat indicated a serious decline in operational readiness. In mid-September, Bf 109 units possessed only 67 percent of crews against authorised aircraft, Bf 110 units just 46 percent, and bomber units 59 percent.)

It was decided to focus on bombing Britain's industrial cities, in daylight, to begin with. The main focus was London. The first major raid took place on 7 September. On 15 September, on a date known as Battle of Britain Day, a large-scale raid was launched in daylight, but suffered significant loss without any lasting gain. Although there were a few large air battles fought in daylight, later in the month and into October, the Luftwaffe switched its main effort to night attacks, official policy starting 7 October. The air campaign against London and other British cities soon got underway.

However, the Luftwaffe faced limitations. Its aircraft—Dornier Do 17, Junkers Ju 88 and Heinkel He 111s—were capable of carrying out strategic missions but the damage they were capable of doing was limited due to their small bomb loads. The Luftwaffe's decision, in the interwar period, to concentrate on medium bombers can be attributed to several reasons:

- Hitler did not intend or foresee a war with Britain in 1939.
- The OKL believed a medium bomber could carry out strategic missions just as well as a heavy bomber force.
- Germany did not possess the resources, nor technical ability, to produce four-engined bombers, before the war.

Although it had equipment capable of doing serious damage, the Luftwaffe also had an unclear strategy, and poor intelligence. The OKL had not been informed that Britain was to be considered a potential opponent, until early 1938; it had too little time to gather reliable intelligence on Britain's industries.

Moreover, the OKL could not settle on an appropriate strategy. German planners had to decide whether the Luftwaffe should deliver the weight of its attacks against a specific segment of British industry (such as aircraft factories), or against a system of interrelated industries (such as Britain's import and distribution network—or even in a blow aimed at breaking the morale of the British population. The Luftwaffe's strategy became increasingly aimless, over the winter of 1940–1941. Disputes among OKL staff revolved more around tactics, than strategy. This lack of clarity condemned the offensive over Britain to failure, well before it had begun.

In an operational capacity, limitations in weapons technology, and quick British reactions, were making it more difficult to achieve strategic effect. Attacking ports, shipping and imports, as well as disrupting rail traffic in the surrounding areas (especially the distribution of coal, an important fuel in all industrial economies of the Second World War) would net a positive result. However, the use of delayed-action bombs, while initially very effective, gradually had less impact, partly because they failed to detonate. (Note: This was caused by moisture ruining the electrical fuzes. German sources estimated 5–10 percent of bombs failed to explode; the British put the figure at 20 percent.) The British had anticipated the change in strategy and dispersed its production facilities, making them less vulnerable to a concentrated attack. Regional commissioners were given plenipotentiary powers to restore communications, and to organise the distribution of supplies to keep the war economy moving.

== Civil defence ==
=== Pre-war preparations and fears ===
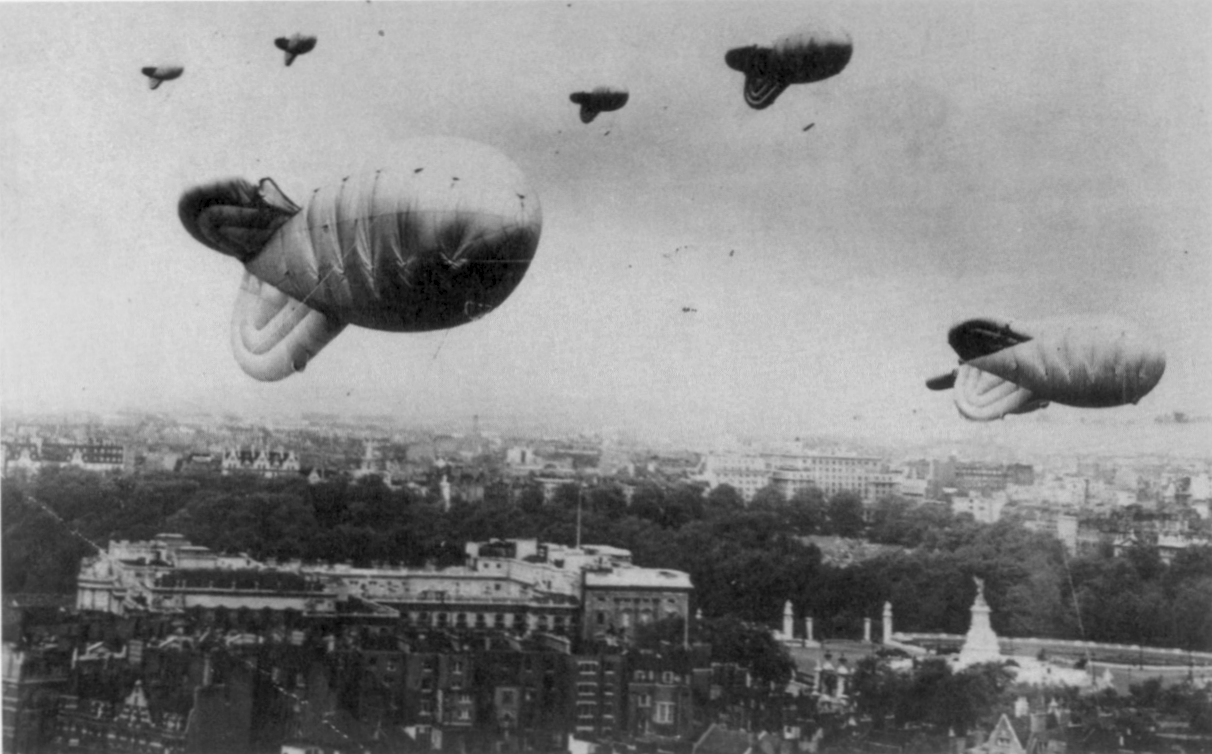
Barrage balloons flying over central London

London had nine million people—a fifth of the British population—living in an area of 750 square miles (1,940 square kilometres), which was difficult to defend because of its size. Based on experience with German strategic bombing during World War I against the United Kingdom, the British government estimated that 50 casualties—with about one-third killed—would result for every tonne of bombs dropped on London. The estimate of tonnes of bombs an enemy could drop per day grew as aircraft technology advanced, from 75 in 1922, to 150 in 1934, to 644 in 1937.

In 1937, the Committee on Imperial Defence estimated that an attack of 60 days would result in 600,000 dead and 1.2 million wounded. News reports of the Spanish Civil War, such as the bombing of Barcelona, supported the 50-casualties-per-tonne estimate. By 1938, experts generally expected that Germany would try to drop as much as 3,500 tonnes in the first 24 hours of war and average 700 tonnes a day for several weeks.

In addition to high-explosive and incendiary bombs, the Germans could use poison gas and even bacteriological warfare, all with a high degree of accuracy. In 1939, the military theoretician B. H. Liddell Hart predicted that 250,000 deaths and injuries in Britain could occur in the first week of war. London hospitals prepared for 300,000 casualties in the first week of war.

British air raid sirens sounded for the first time, 22 minutes after Neville Chamberlain declared war on Germany. Although bombing attacks unexpectedly did not begin immediately during the Phoney War, civilians were aware of the deadly power of aerial attacks through newsreels of Barcelona, the Bombing of Guernica and the Bombing of Shanghai. Many popular works of fiction during the 1920s and 1930s portrayed aerial bombing, such as H. G. Wells' novel The Shape of Things to Come and its 1936 film adaptation, and others such as The Air War of 1936 and The Poison War. Harold Macmillan wrote in 1956 that he and others around him "thought of air warfare in 1938 rather as people think of nuclear war today".

Based in part on the experience of German bombing in the First World War, politicians feared mass psychological trauma from aerial attacks and the collapse of civil society. In 1938, a committee of psychiatrists predicted three times as many mental as physical casualties from aerial bombing, implying three to four million psychiatric patients. Winston Churchill, as a backbencher, told Parliament in 1934, "We must expect that, under the pressure of continuous attack upon London, at least three or four million people would be driven out into the open country around the metropolis". Panic during the Munich crisis, such as the migration by 150,000 people to Wales, contributed to fear of social chaos.

The government planned the evacuation of four million people—mostly women and children—from urban areas, including 1.4 million from London. It expected about 90% of evacuees to stay in private homes, conducted an extensive survey to determine the amount of space available and made detailed preparations for transporting evacuees. A trial blackout was held on 10 August 1939 and when Germany invaded Poland on 1 September, a blackout began at sunset. Lights were not allowed after dark for almost six years, and the blackout became by far the most unpopular aspect of the war for civilians, even more than rationing. The relocation of the government and the civil service was also planned but would only have occurred if necessary so as not to damage civilian morale. Not only was there evacuation over land, but also by ship. The Children's Overseas Reception Board was organised by the government to help parents send their children overseas to four British Dominions—Canada, Australia, New Zealand, and South Africa. The programme evacuated 2,664 boys and girls (ages 5–15) until its ending in October after the sinking of the SS City of Benares with the loss of 81 children out of 100 on board.

Much civil defence preparation in the form of shelters was left in the hands of local authorities and many areas such as Birmingham, Coventry, Belfast and the East End of London did not have enough shelters. The unexpected delay to civilian bombing during the Phoney War meant that the shelter programme finished in June 1940, before the Blitz. The programme favoured back garden Anderson shelters and small brick surface shelters. Many of the latter were abandoned in 1940 as unsafe. Authorities expected that the raids would be brief and in daylight, rather than attacks by night, which forced Londoners to sleep in shelters.

=== Communal shelters ===
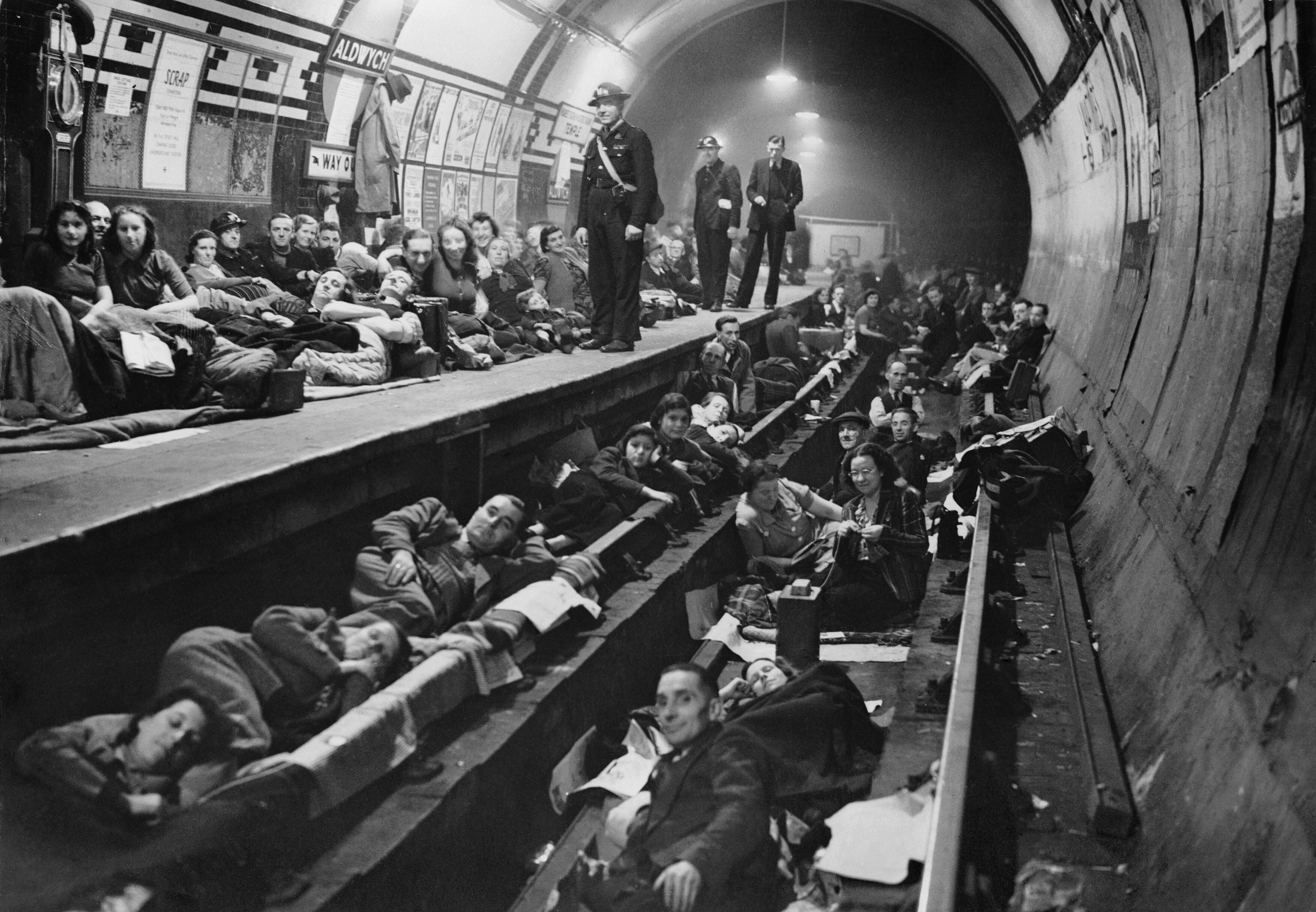
Aldwych tube station being used as a bomb shelter in 1940

Deep shelters provided most protection against a direct hit. The government did not build them for large populations before the war because of cost, time to build and fears that their safety would cause occupants to refuse to leave to return to work or that anti-war sentiment would develop in large congregations of civilians. The government saw the leading role taken by the Communist Party of Great Britain in advocating the building of deep shelters as an attempt to damage civilian morale, especially after the Molotov–Ribbentrop Pact of August 1939.

The most important existing communal shelters were the London Underground stations. Although many civilians had used them for shelter during the First World War, the government in 1939 refused to allow the stations to be used as shelters so as not to interfere with commuter and troop travel and the fears that occupants might refuse to leave. Underground officials were ordered to lock station entrances during raids but by the second week of heavy bombing, the government relented and ordered the stations to be opened.

Each day orderly lines of people queued until 4:00 pm, when they were allowed to enter the stations. In mid-September 1940, about 150,000 people a night slept in the Underground, although by winter and spring the numbers declined to 100,000 or less. Battle noises were muffled and sleep was easier in the deepest stations, but many people were killed from direct hits on stations. In March 1943, 173 men, women and children were crushed to death at Bethnal Green tube station in a crowd surge after a woman fell down the steps as she entered the station. A single direct hit on a shelter in Stoke Newington in October 1940 killed 160 civilians.

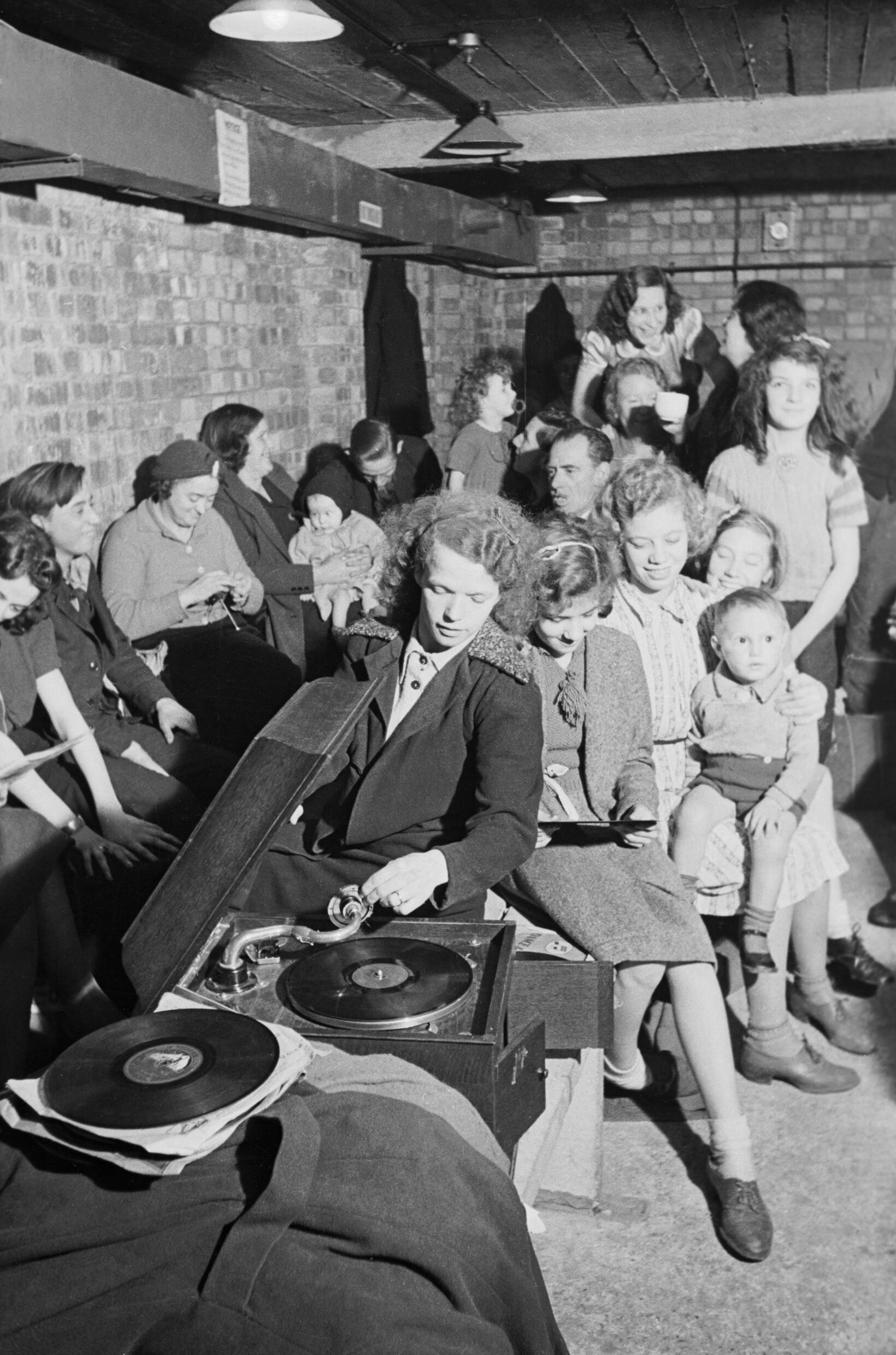
A young woman plays a gramophone in an air raid shelter in north London during 1940.

Communal shelters never housed more than one seventh of Greater London residents. Peak use of the Underground as shelter was 177,000 on 27 September 1940 and a November 1940 census of London found that about 4% of residents used the Tube and other large shelters, 9% in public surface shelters and 27% in private home shelters, implying that the remaining 60% of the city stayed at home. The government distributed Anderson shelters until 1941 and that year began distributing the Morrison shelter, which could be used inside homes.

Public demand caused the government in October 1940 to build new deep shelters within the Underground to hold 80,000 people but the period of heaviest bombing had passed before they were finished. By the end of 1940 improvements had been made in the Underground and in many other large shelters. Authorities provided stoves and bathrooms and canteen trains provided food. Tickets were issued for bunks in large shelters, to reduce the amount of time spent queuing. Committees quickly formed within shelters as informal governments, and organisations such as the British Red Cross and the Salvation Army worked to improve conditions. Entertainment included concerts, films, plays and books from local libraries.

Although only a small number of Londoners used the mass shelters, when journalists, celebrities and foreigners visited they became part of the Beveridge Report, part of a national debate on social and class division. Most residents found that such divisions continued within the shelters and many arguments and fights occurred over noise, space and other matters. Anti-Jewish sentiment was reported, particularly around the East End of London, with antisemitic graffiti and antisemitic rumours, such as that Jewish people were "hogging" air raid shelters. Contrary to pre-war fears of antisemitic violence in the East End, one observer found that the "Cockney and the Jew [worked] together, against the Indian".

=== "Blitz Spirit" ===
Although the intensity of the bombing was not as great as pre-war expectations, thus making an equal comparison impossible, no psychiatric crisis occurred because of the Blitz even during the period of greatest bombing of September 1940. An American witness wrote, "By every test and measure I am able to apply, these people are staunch to the bone and won't quit ... the British are stronger and in a better position than they were at its beginning". People referred to raids as if they were weather, stating that a day was "very blitzy".

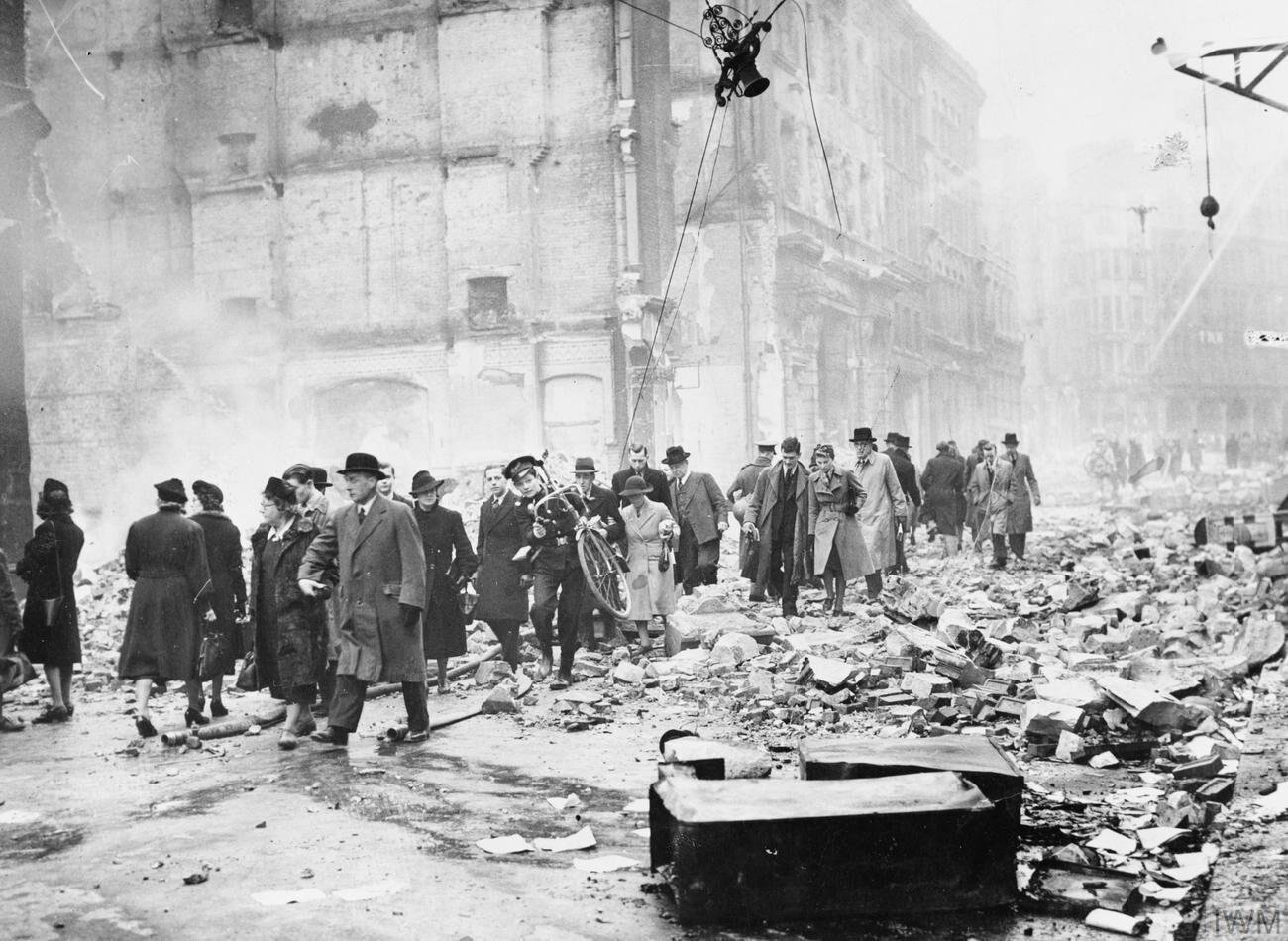
Office workers make their way to work through debris after a heavy air raid.

According to Anna Freud and Edward Glover, London civilians surprisingly did not suffer from widespread shell shock, unlike the soldiers in the Dunkirk evacuation. The psychoanalysts were correct, and the special network of psychiatric clinics opened to receive mental casualties of the attacks closed due to lack of need. Although the stress of the war resulted in many anxiety attacks, eating disorders, fatigue, weeping, miscarriages, and other physical and mental ailments, society did not collapse. The number of suicides and drunkenness declined, and London recorded only about two cases of "bomb neurosis" per week in the first three months of bombing. Many civilians found that the best way to retain mental stability was to be with family, and after the first few weeks of bombing, avoidance of the evacuation programmes grew.

The cheerful crowds visiting bomb sites were so large they interfered with rescue work. Pub visits increased in number (beer was never rationed), and 13,000 attended cricket at Lord's Cricket Ground. People left shelters when told instead of refusing to leave, although many housewives reportedly enjoyed the break from housework. Some people even told government surveyors that they enjoyed air raids if they occurred occasionally, perhaps once a week.

Despite the aerial attacks, defeat in Norway and France, and the threat of invasion, overall morale remained high. A poll by Gallup found only 3% of Britons expected to lose the war in May 1940. Another poll found an 88% approval rating for Churchill in July. A third poll found 89% support for his leadership in October. Support for peace negotiations declined from 29% in February. Each setback caused more civilians to volunteer to become unpaid Local Defence Volunteers, later known as the Home Guard. Workers worked longer shifts and over weekends. Contributions rose to the £5,000 "Spitfire Funds" to build fighters and the number of work days lost to strikes in 1940 was the lowest in history.

=== Civilian mobilisation ===
Civilians of London played an enormous role in protecting their city. Many civilians who were unwilling or unable to join the military joined the Home Guard, the Air Raid Precautions service (ARP), the Auxiliary Fire Service, and many other civilian organisations. The AFS had 138,000 personnel by July 1939. Only one year earlier, there had only been 6,600 full-time and 13,800 part-time firemen in the entire country. Before the war, civilians were issued with 50 million respirators (gas masks) in case bombardment with gas began before evacuation.

During the Blitz, The Scout Association guided fire engines to where they were most needed and became known as the "Blitz Scouts". Many unemployed people were drafted into the Army Pay Corps; and, together with the Pioneer Corps, were tasked with salvaging and clean-up. The Women's Voluntary Services for Civil Defence (WVS) was established in 1938 by the Home Secretary, Samuel Hoare, who considered it the female branch of the ARP. The WVS organised the evacuation of children, established centres for those displaced by bombing and operated canteens, salvage and recycling schemes. By the end of 1941, the WVS had one million members.

Pre-war dire predictions of mass air-raid neurosis were not borne out. Predictions had underestimated civilian adaptability and resourcefulness. There were also many new civil defence roles that gave a sense of fighting back rather than despair. Official histories concluded that the mental health of the nation may have actually improved, while panic was rare.

== Pre-war RAF night defence ==
British air doctrine, since Hugh Trenchard had commanded the Royal Flying Corps (1915–1917), stressed offence as the best means of defence, which became known as the cult of the offensive. To prevent German formations from hitting targets in Britain, Bomber Command would destroy Luftwaffe aircraft on their bases, aircraft in their factories and fuel reserves by attacking oil plants. This philosophy proved impractical, as Bomber Command lacked the technology and equipment for mass night operations, since resources were diverted to Fighter Command in the mid-1930s and it took until 1943 to catch up. Dowding agreed air defence would require some offensive action and that fighters could not defend Britain alone. Until September 1939, the RAF lacked specialist night-fighting aircraft and relied on anti-aircraft units, which were poorly equipped and lacking in numbers.

The attitude of the Air Ministry was in contrast to the experiences of the First World War when German bombers caused physical and psychological damage out of all proportion to their numbers. Around 250 tons (9,000 bombs) had been dropped, killing 1,413 people and injuring 3,500 more. Many people over 35 remembered the bombing and were afraid of more. From 1916 to 1918, German raids had diminished against countermeasures which demonstrated defence against night air raids was possible. Although night air defence was causing greater concern before the war, it was not at the forefront of RAF planning after 1935, when funds were directed into the new ground-based radar day fighter interception system. The difficulty of RAF bombers in night navigation and target finding led the British to believe that it would be the same for German bomber crews. There was also a mentality in all air forces that flying by day would obviate the need for night operations and their inherent disadvantages.

Hugh Dowding, Air Officer Commanding Fighter Command, defeated the Luftwaffe in the Battle of Britain, but preparing day fighter defences left little for night air defence. When the Luftwaffe struck at British cities for the first time on 7 September 1940, a number of civic and political leaders were worried by Dowding's apparent lack of reaction to the new crisis. Dowding accepted that as AOC, he was responsible for the day and night defence of Britain but seemed reluctant to act quickly and his critics in the Air Staff felt that this was due to his stubborn nature. Dowding was summoned on 17 October, to explain the poor state of the night defences and the supposed (but ultimately successful) "failure" of his daytime strategy. The Minister of Aircraft Production, Lord Beaverbrook and Churchill distanced themselves. The failure to prepare adequate night air defences was undeniable but it was not the responsibility of the AOC Fighter Command to dictate the disposal of resources. The general neglect of the RAF until the late spurt in 1938, left few resources for night air defence and the Government, through the Air Ministry and other civil and military institutions was responsible for policy. Before the war, the Chamberlain government stated that night defence from air attack should not take up much of the national effort.

== Technology ==
=== German night navigation devices ===
Map of Knickebein transmitters

Because of the inaccuracy of celestial navigation for night navigation and target finding in a fast-moving aircraft, the Luftwaffe developed radio navigation devices and relied on three systems: Knickebein (Crooked Leg), X-Gerät (X-Device), and Y-Gerät (Y-Device). This led the British to develop countermeasures, which became known as the Battle of the Beams. Bomber crews already had some experience with the Lorenz beam, a commercial blind-landing aid for night or bad weather landings. The Germans adapted the short-range Lorenz system into Knickebein, a 30–33 MHz system, which used two Lorenz beams with much stronger signals. Two aerials at ground stations were rotated so that their beams converged over the target. The German bombers would fly along either beam until they picked up the signal from the other beam. When a continuous sound was heard from the second beam the crew knew they were above the target and dropped their bombs.

Knickebein was in general use but the X-Gerät was reserved for specially trained pathfinder crews. X-Gerät receivers were mounted in He 111s, with a radio mast on the fuselage. The system worked on 66–77 MHz, a higher frequency than Knickebein. Ground transmitters sent pulses at a rate of 180 per minute. X-Gerät received and analysed the pulses, giving the pilot visual and aural directions. Three cross-beams intersected the beam along which the He 111 was flying. The first cross-beam alerted the bomb aimer, who activated a bombing clock when the second cross-beam was reached. When the third cross-beam was reached the bomb aimer activated a third trigger, which stopped the first hand of the clock, with the second hand continuing. When the second hand re-aligned with the first, the bombs were released. The clock mechanism was co-ordinated with the distances of the intersecting beams from the target so the target was directly below when the bombs were released.

Y-Gerät was an automatic beam-tracking system and the most complex of the three devices, which was operated through autopilot. The pilot flew along an approach beam, monitored by a ground controller. Signals from the station were retransmitted by the bomber's equipment, which allowed the distance the bomber had travelled along the beam to be measured precisely. Direction-finding checks also enabled the controller to keep the pilot on course. The crew would be ordered to drop their bombs either by a code word from the ground controller or at the conclusion of the signal transmissions which would stop. The maximum range of Y-Gerät was similar to the other systems and it was accurate enough on occasion for specific buildings to be hit.

=== British countermeasures ===
In June 1940 a German prisoner of war was overheard boasting that the British would never find the Knickebein, even though it was under their noses. The details of the conversation were passed to an RAF Air Staff technical advisor, Dr R. V. Jones, who started a search which discovered that Luftwaffe Lorenz receivers were more than blind-landing devices. Jones began a search for German beams; Avro Ansons of the Beam Approach Training Development Unit (BATDU) were flown up and down Britain fitted with a 30 MHz receiver. Soon a beam was traced to Derby (which had been mentioned in Luftwaffe transmissions). The first jamming operations were carried out using requisitioned hospital electrocautery machines. The counter-operations were carried out by British Electronic Counter Measures (ECM) units under Wing Commander Edward Addison, No. 80 Wing RAF. The production of false radio navigation signals by re-transmitting the originals became known as meaconing using masking beacons (meacons). Up to nine special transmitters directed their signals at the beams in a manner that subtly widened their paths, making it harder for bomber crews to locate targets; confidence in the device was diminished by the time the Luftwaffe was ready to conduct big raids.

German beacons operated on the medium-frequency band and the signals involved a two-letter Morse identifier followed by a lengthy time-lapse which enabled the Luftwaffe crews to determine the signal's bearing. The meacon system involved separate locations for a receiver with a directional aerial and a transmitter. The receipt of the German signal by the receiver was duly passed to the transmitter, the signal to be repeated. The action did not guarantee automatic success. If the German bomber flew closer to its own beam than the meacon then the former signal would come through the stronger on the direction finder. The reverse would apply only if the meacon were closer. In general, German bombers were likely to get through to their targets without too much difficulty. It was to be some months before an effective night-fighter force would be ready, and anti-aircraft defences only became adequate after the Blitz was over, so ruses were created to lure German bombers away from their targets. Throughout 1940 dummy airfields were prepared, good enough to stand up to skilled observation. An unknown number of bombs fell on diversionary ("Starfish sites") which simulated targets, or set up diversionary fires after initial incendiary attacks lit fires, drawing bombers to target areas.

For industrial areas, fires and lighting were simulated. It was decided to recreate normal residential street lighting, and in non-essential areas, lighting to recreate heavy industrial targets. In those sites, carbon arc lamps were used to simulate flashes at tram overhead wires. Red lamps were used to simulate blast furnaces and locomotive fireboxes. Reflections made by factory skylights were created by placing lights under angled wooden panels. The use of diversionary techniques such as fires had to be made carefully. The fake fires could only begin when the bombing started over an adjacent target and its effects were brought under control. Too early and the chances of success receded; too late and the real conflagration at the target would exceed the diversionary fires. Another innovation was the boiler fire. These units were fed from two adjacent tanks containing oil and water. The oil-fed fires were then injected with water from time to time; the flashes produced were similar to those of the German C-250 and C-500 Flammbomben. The hope was that, if it could deceive German bombardiers, it would draw more bombers away from the real target.

== First phase ==
=== Loge and Seeschlange ===
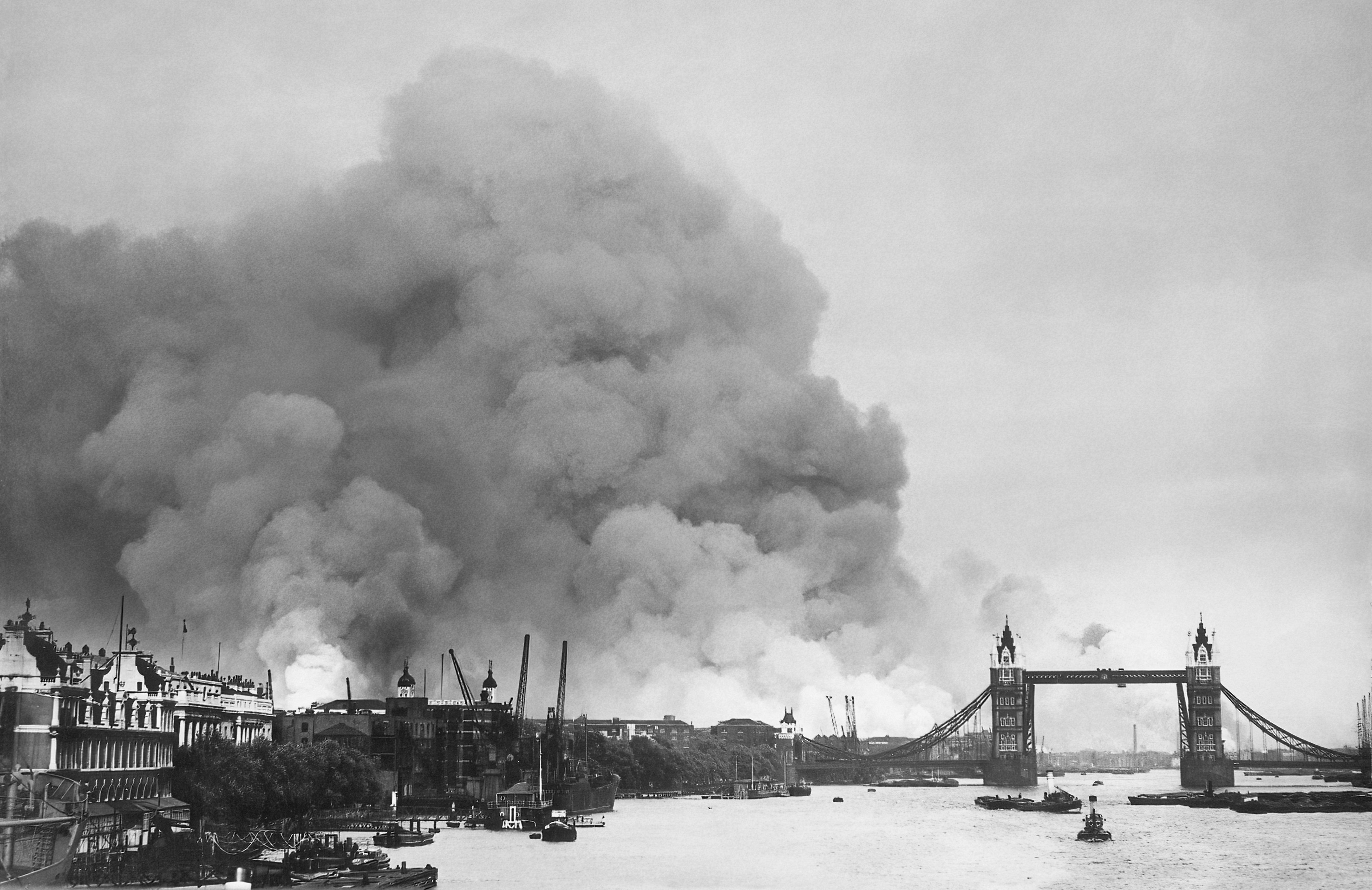
Smoke rising from fires in the London docks, following bombing on 7 September

The first deliberate air raids on London were mainly aimed at the Port of London, causing severe damage. Late in the afternoon of 7 September 1940, the Germans began Operation London (Unternehmen Loge, where Loge was the codename for London) and Operation Sea Snake (Unternehmen Seeschlange), the air offensives against London and other industrial cities. Loge continued for 57 nights. A total of 348 bombers and 617 fighters took part in the attack.

Initially the change in strategy caught the RAF off guard and caused extensive damage and civilian casualties. Some 107,400 gross tons (109,100 t) of shipping was damaged in the Thames Estuary and 1,600 civilians were casualties. Of this total around 400 were killed. The fighting in the air was more intense in daylight. Loge had cost the Luftwaffe 41 aircraft: 14 bombers, 16 Messerschmitt Bf 109s, seven Messerschmitt Bf 110s, and four reconnaissance aircraft. Fighter Command lost 23 fighters, with six pilots killed and another seven wounded. Another 247 bombers from Luftflotte 3 (Air Fleet 3) attacked that night. On 8 September the Luftwaffe returned; 412 people were killed and 747 severely wounded.

On 9 September the OKL appeared to be backing two strategies. Its round-the-clock bombing of London was an immediate attempt to force the British government to capitulate, but it was also striking at Britain's vital sea communications to achieve a victory through siege. Although the weather was poor, heavy raids took place that afternoon on the London suburbs and the airfield at Farnborough. The day's fighting cost Kesselring and Luftflotte 2 (Air Fleet 2) 24 aircraft, including 13 Bf 109s. Fighter Command lost 17 fighters and six pilots. Over the next few days weather was poor and the next main effort would not be made until 15 September 1940.

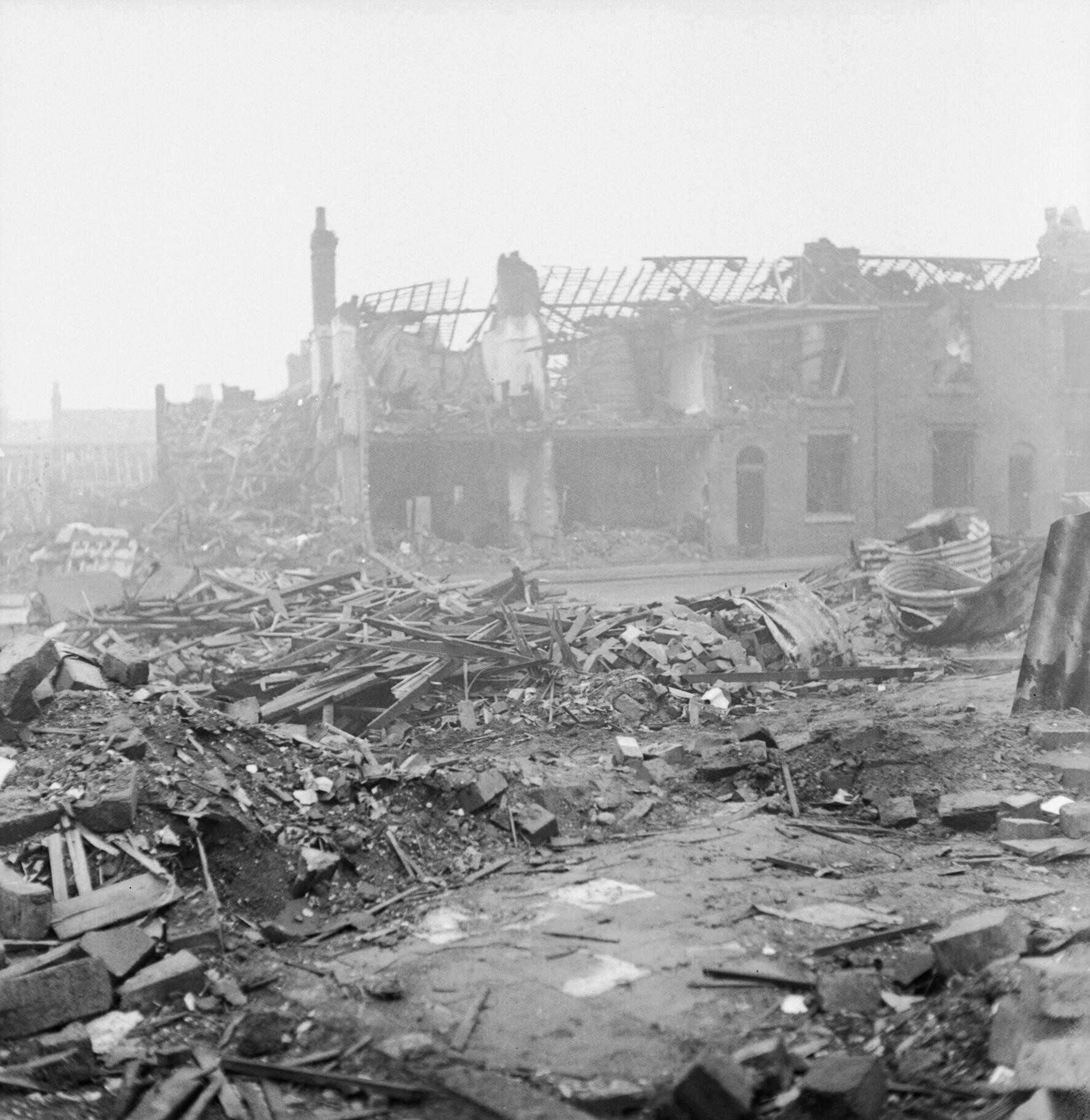
Bomb damage to a street in Birmingham after an air raid

On 15 September the Luftwaffe made two large daylight attacks on London along the Thames Estuary, targeting the docks and rail communications in the city. Its hope was to destroy its targets and draw the RAF into defending them, allowing the Luftwaffe to destroy their fighters in large numbers, thereby achieving air superiority. Large air battles broke out, lasting for most of the day. The first attack merely damaged the rail network for three days, and the second attack failed altogether. The air battle was later commemorated by Battle of Britain Day. The Luftwaffe lost 18 percent of the bombers sent on the operations that day and failed to gain air superiority.

While Göring was optimistic the Luftwaffe could prevail, Hitler was not. On 17 September he postponed Operation Sea Lion (as it turned out, indefinitely) rather than gamble Germany's newly gained military prestige on a risky cross-Channel operation, particularly in the face of a sceptical Joseph Stalin in the Soviet Union. In the last days of the battle, the bombers became lures in an attempt to draw the RAF into combat with German fighters. But their operations were to no avail; the worsening weather and unsustainable attrition in daylight gave the OKL an excuse to switch to night attacks on 7 October.

On 14 October the heaviest night attack to date saw 380 German bombers from Luftflotte 3 hit London. Around 200 people were killed and another 2,000 injured. British anti-aircraft defences (led by General Frederick Alfred Pile) fired 8,326 rounds and shot down only 2 bombers. On 15 October the bombers returned and about 900 fires were started by the mix of 376 tons (382 t) of high explosive and 10 tons of incendiaries dropped. Five main rail lines were cut in London and rolling stock damaged.

Loge continued during October. 8200 tons (8,330 t) of bombs were dropped that month, about 10 percent in daylight, over 5400 tons (5,490 t) on London during the night. Birmingham and Coventry were subject to 450 long tons (457 t) of bombs between them in the last 10 days of October. Liverpool suffered 180 long tons (183 t) of bombs dropped. Hull and Glasgow were attacked but 715 long tons (726 t) of bombs were spread out all over Britain. The Metropolitan-Vickers works in Manchester was hit by 12 long tons (12.2 t) of bombs. Little tonnage was dropped on Fighter Command airfields; Bomber Command airfields were hit instead.

Luftwaffe policy at this point was primarily to continue progressive attacks on London, chiefly by night attack; second, to interfere with production in the vast industrial arms factories of the West Midlands, again chiefly by night attack; and third to disrupt plants and factories during the day by means of fighter-bombers.

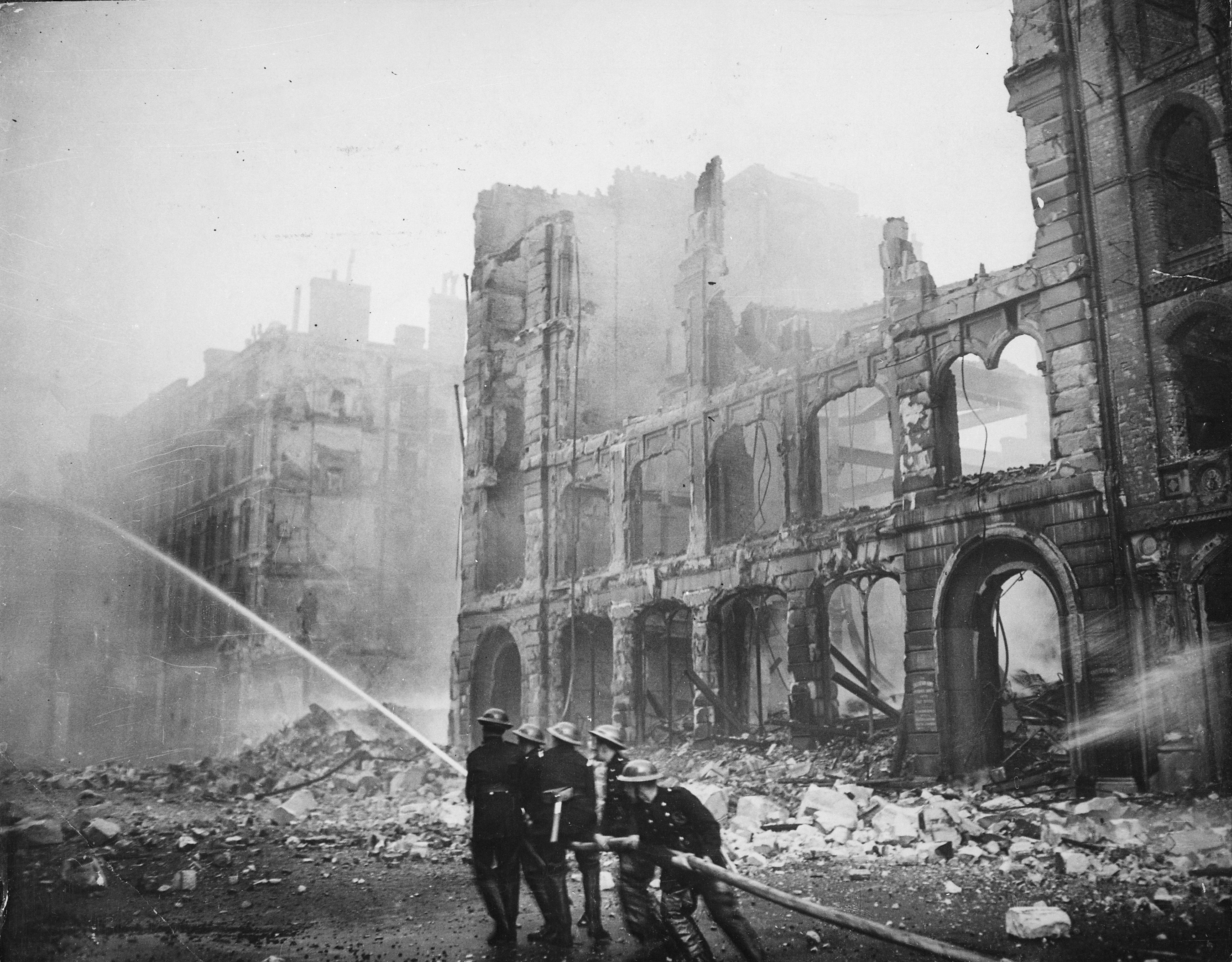
Firefighters tackling a blaze amongst ruined buildings after an air raid on London

Kesselring, commanding Luftflotte 2, was ordered to send 50 sorties per night against London and attack eastern harbours in daylight. Sperrle, commanding Luftflotte 3, was ordered to dispatch 250 sorties per night including 100 against the West Midlands. Seeschlange would be carried out by Fliegerkorps X (10th Air Corps) which concentrated on mining operations against shipping. It also took part in the bombing over Britain. By 19/20 April 1941 it had dropped 3,984 mines, 1/3 of the total dropped. The mines' ability to destroy entire streets earned them respect in Britain, but several fell unexploded into British hands allowing counter-measures to be developed which damaged the German anti-shipping campaign.

By mid-November 1940, when the Germans adopted a changed plan, more than 11,600 long tons (11,800 t) of high explosive and nearly 1,000,000 incendiaries had fallen on London. Outside the capital, there had been widespread harassing activity by single aircraft, as well as fairly strong diversionary attacks on Birmingham, Coventry and Liverpool, but no major raids. The London docks and railways communications had taken a heavy pounding, and much damage had been done to the railway system outside. In September, there had been no less than 667 hits on railways in Great Britain, and at one period, between 5,000 and 6,000 wagons were standing idle from the effect of delayed action bombs. But the great bulk of the traffic went on, and Londoners—though they glanced apprehensively each morning at the list of closed stretches of line displayed at their local station, or made strange detours round back streets in the buses—still got to work. For all the destruction of life and property, the observers sent out by the Ministry of Home Security failed to discover the slightest sign of a break in morale. More than 13,000 civilians had been killed, and almost 20,000 injured, in September and October alone, but the death toll was much less than expected. In late 1940, Churchill credited the shelters.

Wartime observers perceived the bombing as indiscriminate. An American observer named Ralph Ingersoll reported the bombing was inaccurate and did not hit targets of military value, but destroyed the surrounding areas. He wrote that Battersea Power Station, one of the largest landmarks in London, received only a minor hit. In fact, on 8 September 1940 both Battersea and West Ham Power Station were both shut down after the 7 September daylight attack on London. In the case of Battersea power station, an unused extension was hit and destroyed during November but the station was not put out of action during the night attacks. It is not clear whether the power station or any specific structure was targeted during the German offensive as the Luftwaffe could not accurately bomb select targets during night operations. In the initial operations against London, it did appear as if rail targets and the bridges over the Thames had been singled out: Victoria Station was hit by four bombs and suffered extensive damage. The bombing disrupted rail traffic through London without destroying any of the crossings. On 7 November, St Pancras, Kensal and Bricklayers Arms stations were hit and several lines of Southern Rail were cut on 10 November. The British government grew anxious about the delays and disruption of supplies during the month. Reports suggested the attacks blocked the movement of coal to the Greater London regions and urgent repairs were required. Attacks against East End docks were effective and many Thames barges were destroyed. The London Underground rail system was also affected; high explosive bombs damaged the tunnels rendering some unsafe. The London Docklands, in particular, the Royal Victoria Dock, received many hits and Port of London trade was disrupted. In some cases the concentration of the bombing and resulting conflagration created firestorms of 1,000 °C (2000 °F). The Ministry of Home Security reported that although the damage caused was "serious" it was not "crippling" and the quays, basins, railways and equipment remained operational.

=== Improvements in British defences ===
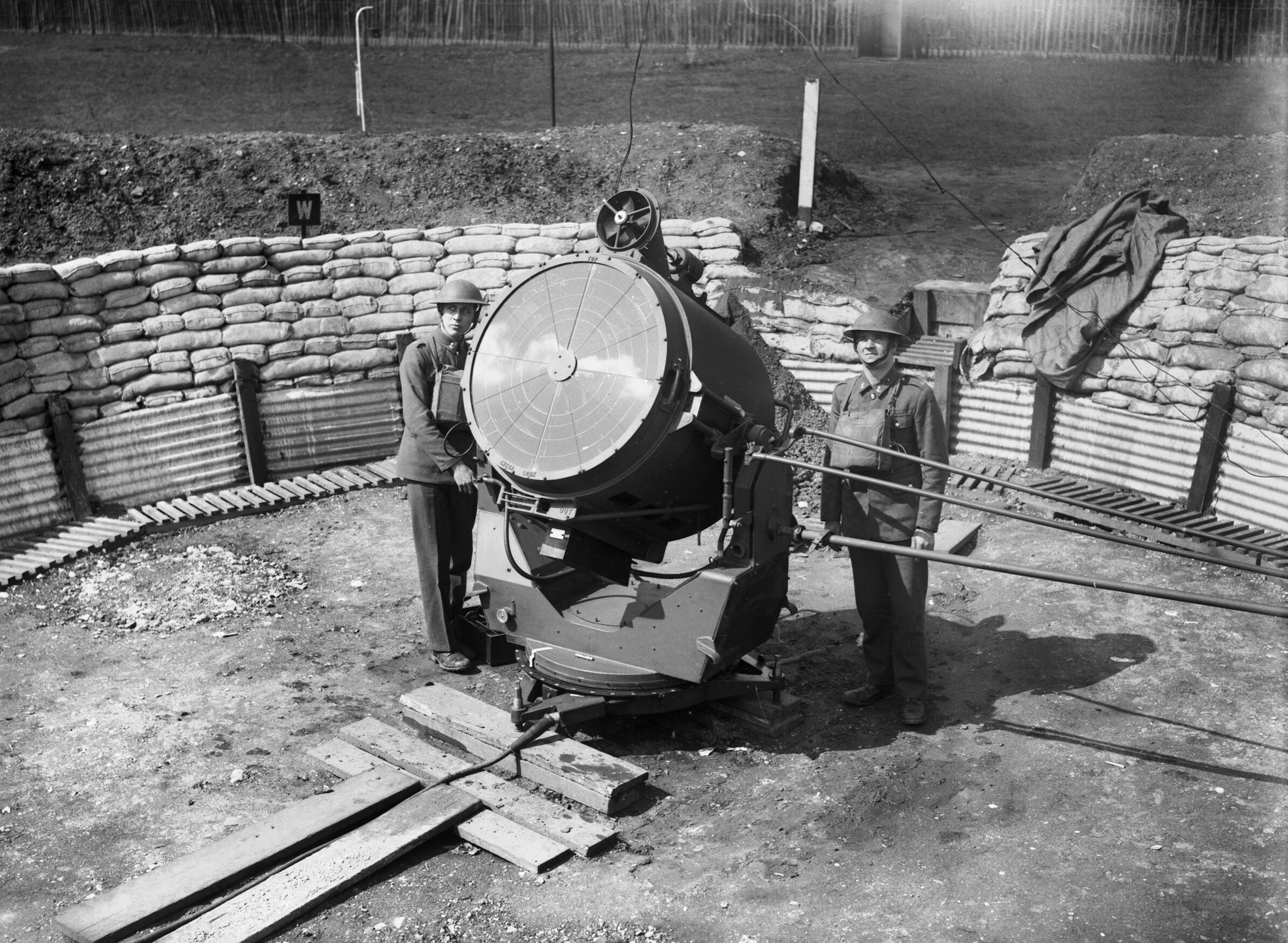
An anti-aircraft searchlight and crew at the Royal Hospital Chelsea, 17 April 1940

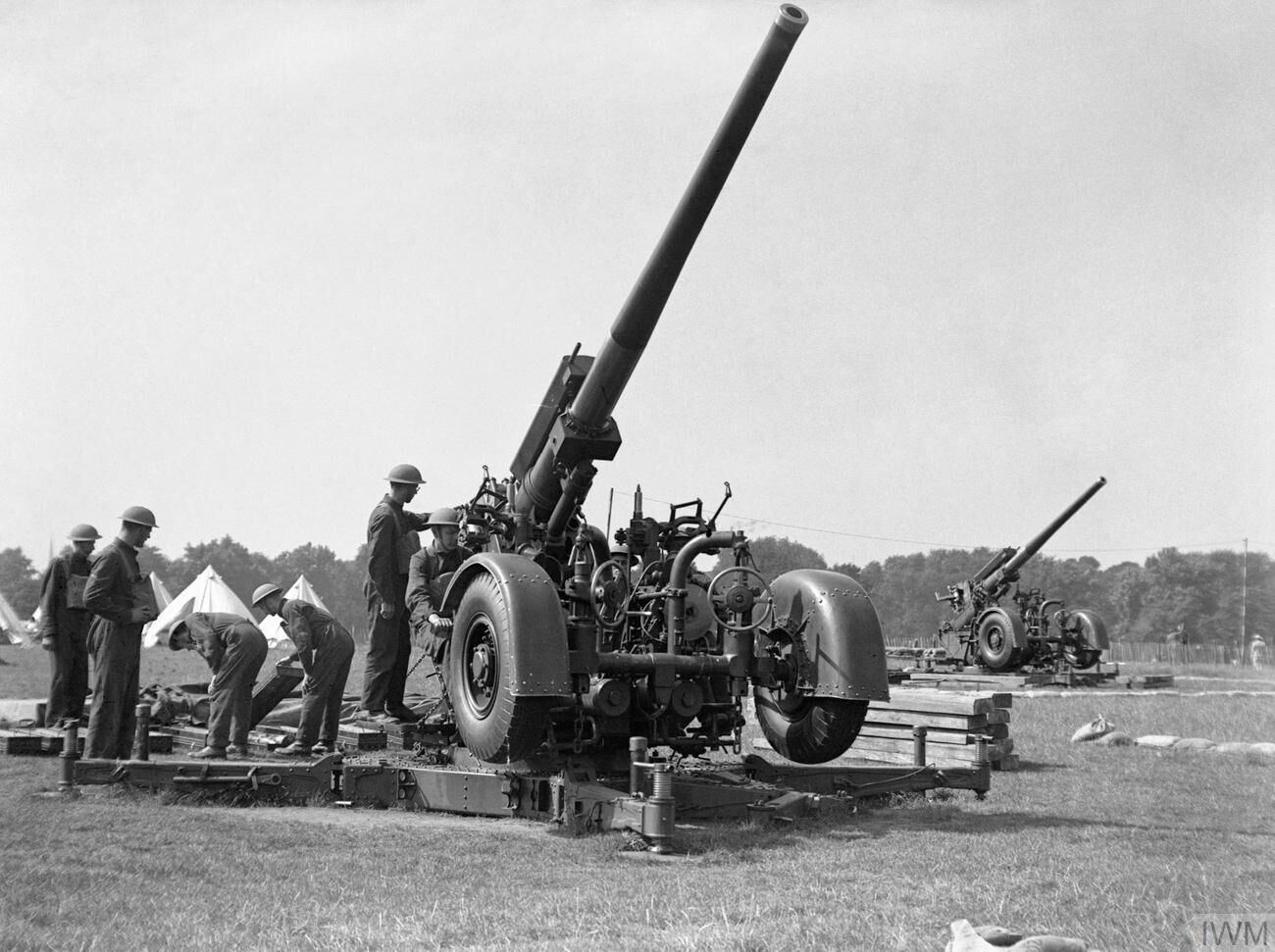
3.7-inch anti-aircraft guns in Hyde Park, London

British night air defences were in a poor state. Few anti-aircraft guns had fire-control systems, and the underpowered searchlights were usually ineffective against aircraft at altitudes above 12,000 ft (3,700 m). In July 1940, only 1,200 heavy and 549 light guns were deployed in the whole of Britain. Of the "heavies", some 200 were of the obsolescent 3 in (76 mm) type; the remainder were the effective 4.5 in (110 mm) and 3.7 in (94 mm) guns, with a theoretical ceiling of over 30,000 ft (9,100 m) but a practical limit of 25,000 ft (7,600 m) because the predictor in use could not accept greater heights. The light guns, about half of which were of the excellent Bofors 40 mm, dealt with aircraft only up to 6,000 ft (1,800 m). Although the use of the guns improved civilian morale, with the knowledge the German bomber crews were facing the barrage, it is now believed that the anti-aircraft guns achieved little and in fact the falling shell fragments caused more British casualties on the ground.

Few fighter aircraft were able to operate at night. Ground-based radar was limited, and airborne radar and RAF night fighters were generally ineffective. RAF day fighters were converting to night operations and the interim Bristol Blenheim night fighter conversion of the light bomber was being replaced by the powerful Beaufighter, but this was only available in very small numbers. By the second month of the Blitz the defences were not performing well. London's defences were rapidly reorganised by General Pile, the Commander-in-Chief of Anti-Aircraft Command. The difference this made to the effectiveness of air defences is questionable. The British were still one-third below the establishment of heavy anti-aircraft artillery AAA (or ack-ack) in May 1941, with only 2,631 weapons available. Dowding had to rely on night fighters. From 1940 to 1941, the most successful night-fighter was the Boulton Paul Defiant; its four squadrons shot down more enemy aircraft than any other type. AA defences improved by better use of radar and searchlights. Over several months, the 20,000 shells spent per raider shot down in September 1940, was reduced to 4,087 in January 1941 and to 2,963 shells in February 1941.

Aircraft interception radar (AI) then available was unreliable. The heavy fighting in the Battle of Britain had eaten up most of Fighter Command's resources, so there was little investment in night fighting. Bombers were flown with airborne search lights out of desperation but to little avail. Of greater potential was the GL (gun-laying) radar and searchlights with fighter direction from RAF fighter control rooms to begin a GCI system (Ground Control-led Interception) under Group-level control (No. 10 Group RAF, No. 11 Group RAF and No. 12 Group RAF). Whitehall's disquiet at the failures of the RAF led to the replacement of Dowding (who was already due for retirement) with Sholto Douglas on 25 November. Douglas set about introducing more squadrons and dispersing the few GL sets to create a carpet effect in the southern counties. Still, in February 1941, there remained only seven squadrons with 87 pilots, under half the required strength. The GL carpet was supported by six GCI sets controlling radar-equipped night-fighters. By the height of the Blitz, they were becoming more successful. The number of contacts and combats rose in 1941, from 44 and two in 48 sorties in January 1941, to 204 and 74 in May (643 sorties). But even in May, 67 percent of the sorties were visual cat's-eye missions. Curiously, while 43 percent of the contacts in May 1941 were by visual sightings, they accounted for 61 percent of the combats. Yet when compared with Luftwaffe daylight operations, there was a sharp decline in German losses to one percent. If a vigilant bomber crew could spot the fighter first, they had a decent chance of evading it.

Nevertheless, it was radar that proved to be the critical weapon in the night battles over Britain from this point onward. Dowding had introduced the concept of aircraft interception radar and encouraged its usage. Eventually, it would become a success. On the night of 22/23 July 1940, Flying Officer Cyril Ashfield (pilot), Pilot Officer Geoffrey Morris (air observer) and Flight Sergeant Reginald Leyland (aircraft intercept radar operator) of the Fighter Interception Unit became the first pilot and crew to intercept and destroy an enemy aircraft using onboard radar to guide them to a visual interception, when their AI night fighter brought down a Do 17 off Sussex. On 19 November 1940 the RAF night fighter ace John Cunningham shot down a Ju 88 bomber using aircraft interception radar, just as Dowding had predicted. By mid-November, nine squadrons were available, but only one was equipped with Beaufighters (No. 219 Squadron RAF at RAF Kenley). By 16 February 1941, this had grown to 12; with 5 equipped, or partially equipped with Beaufighters spread over 5 Groups.

=== Italian Air Corps ===
The Corpo Aereo Italiano (literally, "Italian Air Corps"), or CAI, was an expeditionary force from the Italian Regia Aeronautica (Italian Royal Air Force) that participated in the Battle of Britain and the Blitz during the final months of 1940. The Air Corps was created by Italian dictator Benito Mussolini to assist his German ally during the Battle of Britain. On 10 September 1940, the CAI was formed, under the command of Generale di Squadra Aerea Rino Corso Fougier.

The corps comprised 50 Fiat CR.42 biplane fighter, 45 Fiat G.50 Freccia monoplane fighters and a squadron of Fiat BR.20 twin engined bombers.

The first raid was a night time bombing mission when 18 BR.20s attacked Harwich and Felixstowe on 24/25 October. On 29 October 15 bombers with a heavy fighter escort attacked Ramsgate during the daytime. There were 8 further night time bomber attacks on Harwich and Ipswich and one daylight bomber raid of Harwich with an escort of 40 fighters. The last raid was by 5 bombers against Ipswich on the night of 2 January.

In total 54.3 tons (55.2 tonnes) of bombs were dropped in 102 sorties.

== Second phase ==
=== Night attacks ===
From November 1940 to February 1941 the Luftwaffe shifted its strategy and attacked other industrial cities. In particular, the West Midlands were targeted. On the night of 13/14 November, 77 He 111s of Kampfgeschwader 26 (26th Combat Wing, or KG 26) bombed London, while 63 from KG 55 hit Birmingham. The next night, a large force hit Coventry. "Pathfinders" from 12 Kampfgruppe 100 (Combat Group 100 or KGr 100) led 437 bombers from KG 1, KG 3, KG 26, KG 27, KG 55 and Lehrgeschwader 1 (1st Training Wing, or LG 1) which dropped 350 long tons (356 t) of high explosive, 50 long tons (50.8 t) of incendiaries, and 127 parachute mines. Other sources say 449 bombers and a total of 470 long tons (478 t) of bombs were dropped. The raid against Coventry was particularly devastating, and led to widespread use of the phrase "to coventrate". Over 10,000 incendiaries were dropped. Around 21 factories were seriously damaged in Coventry, and loss of public utilities stopped work at nine others, disrupting industrial output for several months. The historic cathedral was all but destroyed together with most of the city centre in the massive firestorm. Only one bomber was lost, to anti-aircraft fire, despite the RAF flying 125 night sorties. No follow-up raids were made, as OKL underestimated the British power of recovery (as Bomber Command would do over Germany from 1943 to 1945). The Germans were surprised by the success of the attack. The strategic effect of the raid was a brief 20 percent dip in aircraft production.

Five nights later, Birmingham was hit by 369 bombers from KG 54, KG 26, and KG 55. By the end of November, 1,100 bombers were available for night raids. An average of 200 were able to strike per night. This weight of attack went on for two months, with the Luftwaffe dropping 12,400 long tons (12,600 t) of bombs. In November 1940, 6,000 sorties and 23 major attacks (more than 100 tons [102 t] of bombs dropped) were flown. Two heavy attacks (50 long tons (51 t) of bombs) were also flown. In December, only 11 major and five heavy attacks were made.

Probably the most devastating attack occurred on the evening of 29 December, when German aircraft attacked the City of London itself with incendiary and high explosive bombs, causing a firestorm that has been called the Second Great Fire of London. The first group to use these incendiaries was Kampfgruppe 100 which despatched 10 "pathfinder" He 111s. At 18:17, it released the first of 10,000 firebombs, eventually amounting to 300 dropped per minute. Altogether, 130 German bombers destroyed the historical centre of London. Civilian casualties on London throughout the Blitz amounted to 28,556 killed, and 25,578 wounded. The Luftwaffe had dropped 16,331 long tons (16,593 t) of bombs.

Not all of the Luftwaffe effort was made against inland cities. Port cities were also attacked to try to disrupt trade and sea communications. In January 1941 Swansea was bombed four times, on 17 January very heavily, when around 100 bombers dropped a high concentration of incendiaries, some 32,000 in all. The main damage was inflicted on the commercial and domestic areas. Heavy and sustained bombing occurred in February in the 'Three Nights' Blitz' from 19 to 21 February. A total of 230 people were killed and 397 were injured. Swansea was selected by the Germans as a legitimate strategic target due to its importance as a port and docks and the oil refinery just beyond, and its destruction was key to Nazi German war efforts as part of their strategic bombing campaign aimed at crippling coal export and demoralizing civilians and emergency services. Waves of 150 bombers destroyed vast swaths of Southsea (Portsmouth) and Gosport with 40,000 incendiaries. Warehouses, rail lines and houses were destroyed and damaged, but the docks were largely untouched. In January and February 1941, Luftwaffe serviceability rates declined until just 551 of 1,214 bombers were combat-worthy. Seven major and eight heavy attacks were flown, but the weather made it difficult to keep up the pressure. Still, at Southampton, attacks were so effective morale did give way briefly with civilian authorities leading people en masse out of the city.

=== Strategic or "terror" bombing ===
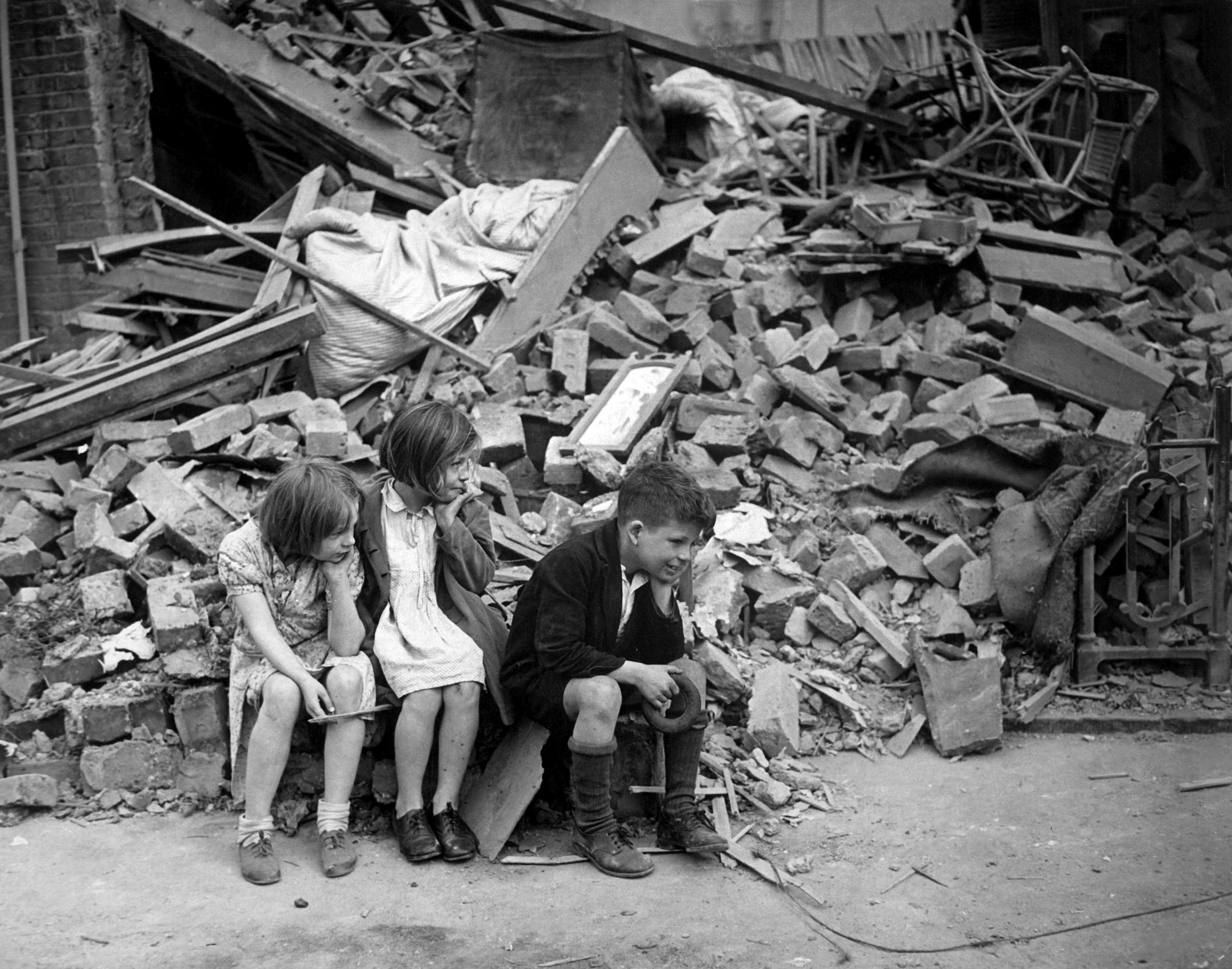
Children in the East End of London, made homeless by the Blitz

Although official German air doctrine did target civilian morale, it did not espouse the attacking of civilians directly. It hoped to destroy morale by destroying the enemy's factories and public utilities as well as its food stocks (by attacking shipping). Nevertheless, its official opposition to attacks on civilians became an increasingly moot point when large-scale raids were conducted in November and December 1940. Although not encouraged by official policy, the use of mines and incendiaries, for tactical expediency, came close to indiscriminate bombing. Locating targets in skies obscured by industrial haze meant the target area needed to be illuminated and hit "without regard for the civilian population". Special units, such as KGr 100, became the Beleuchtergruppe (Firelighter Group), which used incendiaries and high explosives to mark the target area. The tactic was expanded into Feuerleitung (Blaze Control) with the creation of Brandbombenfelder (Incendiary Fields) to mark targets. These were marked out by parachute flares. Then bombers carrying SC 1000 (1,000 kg (2,205 lb)), SC 1400 (1,400 kg (3,086 lb)), and SC 1800 (1,800 kg (3,968 lb)) "Satan" bombs were used to level streets and residential areas. By December, the SC 2500 (2,500 kg (5,512 lb)) "Max" bomb was used.

These decisions, apparently taken at the Luftflotte or Fliegerkorps level, meant attacks on individual targets were gradually replaced by what was, for all intents and purposes, an unrestricted area attack or Terrorangriff (terror attack). Part of the reason for this was inaccuracy of navigation. The effectiveness of British countermeasures against Knickebein caused the Luftwaffe to prefer fire light instead for target marking and navigation. The shift from precision bombing to area attack is indicated in the tactical methods and weapons dropped. KGr 100 increased its use of incendiaries from 13 to 28 per cent. By December this had increased to 92 per cent. Use of incendiaries, which were inherently inaccurate, indicated much less care was taken to avoid civilian property close to industrial sites. Other units ceased using parachute flares and opted for explosive target markers. Captured German aircrews also indicated the homes of industrial workers were deliberately targeted.

== Final attacks ==
=== Directive 23: Göring and the Kriegsmarine ===
In 1941 the Luftwaffe shifted strategy again. Erich Raeder—commander-in-chief of the Kriegsmarine—had long argued the Luftwaffe should support the German submarine force (U-Bootwaffe) in the Battle of the Atlantic by attacking shipping in the Atlantic Ocean and attacking British ports. Eventually, he convinced Hitler of the need to attack British port facilities. At Raeder's prompting, Hitler correctly noted that the greatest damage to the British war economy had been done through the destruction of merchant shipping by submarines and air attacks by small numbers of Focke-Wulf Fw 200 naval aircraft and ordered the German air arm to focus its efforts against British convoys. This meant that British coastal centres and shipping at sea west of Ireland were the prime targets.

Hitler's interest in this strategy forced Göring and Jeschonnek to review the air war against Britain in January 1941. This led to their agreeing to Hitler's Directive 23, Directions for operations against the British War Economy, which was published on 6 February 1941 and gave aerial interdiction of British imports by sea top priority. This strategy had been recognised before the war, but Operation Eagle Attack and the following Battle of Britain had got in the way of striking at Britain's sea communications and diverted German air strength to the campaign against the RAF and its supporting structures. The OKL had always regarded the interdiction of sea communications of less importance than bombing land-based aircraft industries.

Directive 23 was the only concession made by Göring to the Kriegsmarine over the strategic bombing strategy of the Luftwaffe against Britain. Thereafter, he would refuse to make available any air units to destroy British dockyards, ports, port facilities, or shipping in dock or at sea, lest the Kriegsmarine gain control of more Luftwaffe units. Raeder's successor, Karl Dönitz, would, on the intervention of Hitler, gain control of one unit (KG 40), but Göring would soon regain it. Göring's lack of co-operation was detrimental to the one air strategy with potentially decisive strategic effect on Britain. Instead, he wasted aircraft of Fliegerführer Atlantik (Flying Command Atlantic) on bombing mainland Britain instead of attacks against convoys. For Göring, his prestige had been damaged by the defeat in the Battle of Britain, and he wanted to regain it by subduing Britain by air power alone. He was always reluctant to co-operate with Raeder.

Even so, the decision by the OKL to support the strategy in Directive 23 was instigated by two considerations, both of which had little to do with wanting to destroy Britain's sea communications in conjunction with the Kriegsmarine. First, the difficulty in estimating the impact of bombing upon war production was becoming apparent, and second, the conclusion British morale was unlikely to break led the OKL to adopt the naval option. The indifference displayed by the OKL to Directive 23 was perhaps best demonstrated in operational directives which diluted its effect. They emphasised the core strategic interest was attacking ports but they insisted in maintaining pressure or diverting strength, onto industries building aircraft, anti-aircraft guns, and explosives. Other targets would be considered if the primary ones could not be attacked because of weather conditions.

A further line in the directive stressed the need to inflict the heaviest losses possible, but also to intensify the air war in order to create the impression an amphibious assault on Britain was planned for 1941. However, meteorological conditions over Britain were not favourable for flying and prevented an escalation in air operations. Airfields became waterlogged and the 18 Kampfgruppen (bomber groups) of the Luftwaffe's Kampfgeschwadern (bomber wings) were relocated to Germany for rest and re-equipment.

=== British ports ===
From the German point of view, March 1941 saw an improvement. The Luftwaffe flew 4,000 sorties that month, including 12 major and three heavy attacks. The electronic war intensified but the Luftwaffe flew major inland missions only on moonlit nights. Ports were easier to find and made better targets. To confuse the British, radio silence was observed until the bombs fell. X- and Y-Gerät beams were placed over false targets and switched only at the last minute. Rapid frequency changes were introduced for X-Gerät, whose wider band of frequencies and greater tactical flexibility ensured it remained effective at a time when British selective jamming was degrading the effectiveness of Y-Gerät.

By now, the imminent threat of invasion had all but passed as the Luftwaffe had failed to gain the prerequisite air superiority. The aerial bombing was now principally aimed at the destruction of industrial targets, but also continued with the objective of breaking the morale of the civilian population. The attacks were focused against western ports in March. These attacks produced some breaks in morale, with civil leaders fleeing the cities before the offensive reached its height. But the Luftwaffe's effort eased in the last 10 attacks as seven Kampfgruppen moved to Austria in preparation for the Balkans Campaign in Yugoslavia and Greece. The shortage of bombers caused OKL to improvise. Some 50 Junkers Ju 87 Stuka dive-bombers and Jabos (fighter-bombers) were used, officially classed as Leichte Kampfflugzeuge ("light bombers") and sometimes called Leichte Kesselringe ("Light Kesselrings"). The defences failed to prevent widespread damage but on some occasions did prevent German bombers concentrating on their targets. On occasion, only one-third of German bombs hit their targets.

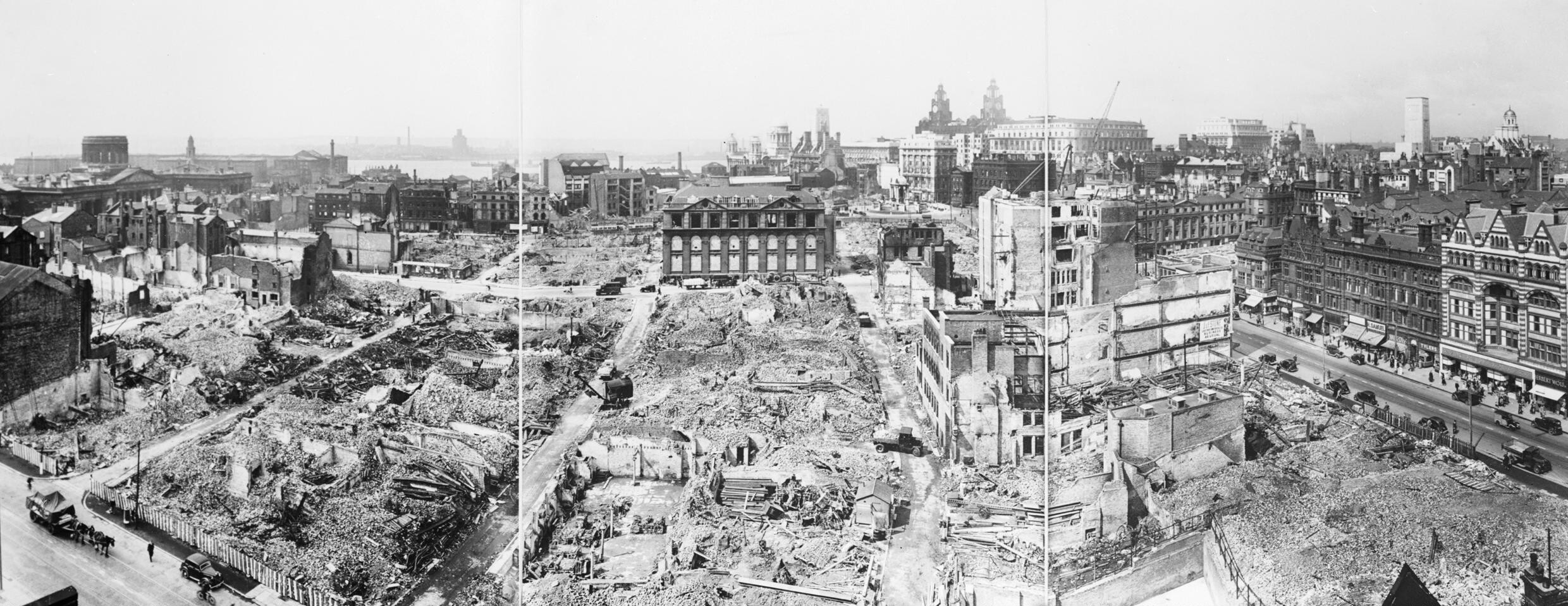
Liverpool city centre after heavy bombing. The majority of the city, however, was undamaged.

With heavier bombers being diverted to the Balkans, the crews and units left behind were asked to fly two or three sorties per night. Bombers were noisy, cold, and vibrated badly. Added to the tension of the mission which exhausted and drained crews, tiredness caught up with and killed many. In one incident on 28/29 April, Peter Stahl of KG 30 was flying on his 50th mission. He fell asleep at the controls of his Ju 88 and woke up to discover the entire crew asleep. He roused them, ensured they took oxygen and dextro-energen amphetamine tablets, then completed the mission.

The Luftwaffe could still inflict much damage, and after the German conquest of Western Europe, the air and submarine offensive against British sea communications became much more dangerous than the German offensive during the First World War. Liverpool and its port became an important destination for convoys heading through the Western Approaches from North America, bringing supplies and materials. The considerable rail network distributed to the rest of the country. Air attacks sank 39,126 long tons (39,754 t) of shipping, with another 111,601 long tons (113,392 t) damaged. Minister of Home Security Herbert Morrison was also worried morale was breaking, noting the defeatism expressed by civilians. Other sources point out that half of the 144 berths in the port were rendered unusable and cargo unloading capability was reduced by 75 percent. Roads and railways were blocked and ships could not leave harbour. On 8 May 1941, 57 ships were destroyed, sunk or damaged, amounting to 80,000 long tons (81,300 t). Around 66,000 houses were destroyed and 77,000 people made homeless ("bombed out"), with 1,900 people killed and 1,450 seriously hurt on one night. Operations against London until May 1941 could also have a severe impact on morale. The populace of the port of Hull became "trekkers", people who made a mass exodus from cities before, during and after attacks. The Luftwaffe attacks failed to knock out railways or port facilities for long, even in the Port of London, a particularly important target as it brought in one-third of overseas trade.

On 13 March the upper Clyde port of Clydebank near Glasgow was bombed (Clydebank Blitz). All but seven of its 12,000 houses were damaged. Many more ports were attacked. Plymouth was attacked five times before the end of the month while Belfast, Hull, and Cardiff were hit. Cardiff was bombed on three nights; Portsmouth centre was devastated by five raids. The rate of civilian housing loss was averaging 40,000 people per week dehoused in September 1940. In March 1941, two raids on Plymouth and London dehoused 148,000 people. Still, while heavily damaged, British ports continued to support war industry and supplies from North America continued to pass through them while the Royal Navy continued to operate in Plymouth, Southampton, and Portsmouth. Plymouth in particular, because of its vulnerable position on the south coast and close proximity to German air bases, was subjected to the heaviest attacks. On 10/11 March 240 bombers dropped 193 tons (196 t) of high explosives and 46,000 incendiaries. Many houses and commercial centres were heavily damaged, the electrical supply was knocked out, and five oil tanks and two magazines exploded. Nine days later, two waves of 125 and 170 bombers dropped heavy bombs, including 160 tons (163 t) of high explosive and 32,000 incendiaries. Much of the city centre was destroyed. Damage was inflicted on the port installations, but many bombs fell on the city itself. On 17 April 346 tons (352 t) of explosives and 46,000 incendiaries were dropped from 250 bombers led by KG 26. The damage was considerable, and the Germans also dropped parachute mines. Over 2,000 AAA shells were fired, destroying two Ju 88s. By the end of the air campaign over Britain, only eight per cent of the German effort against British ports was made using mines.

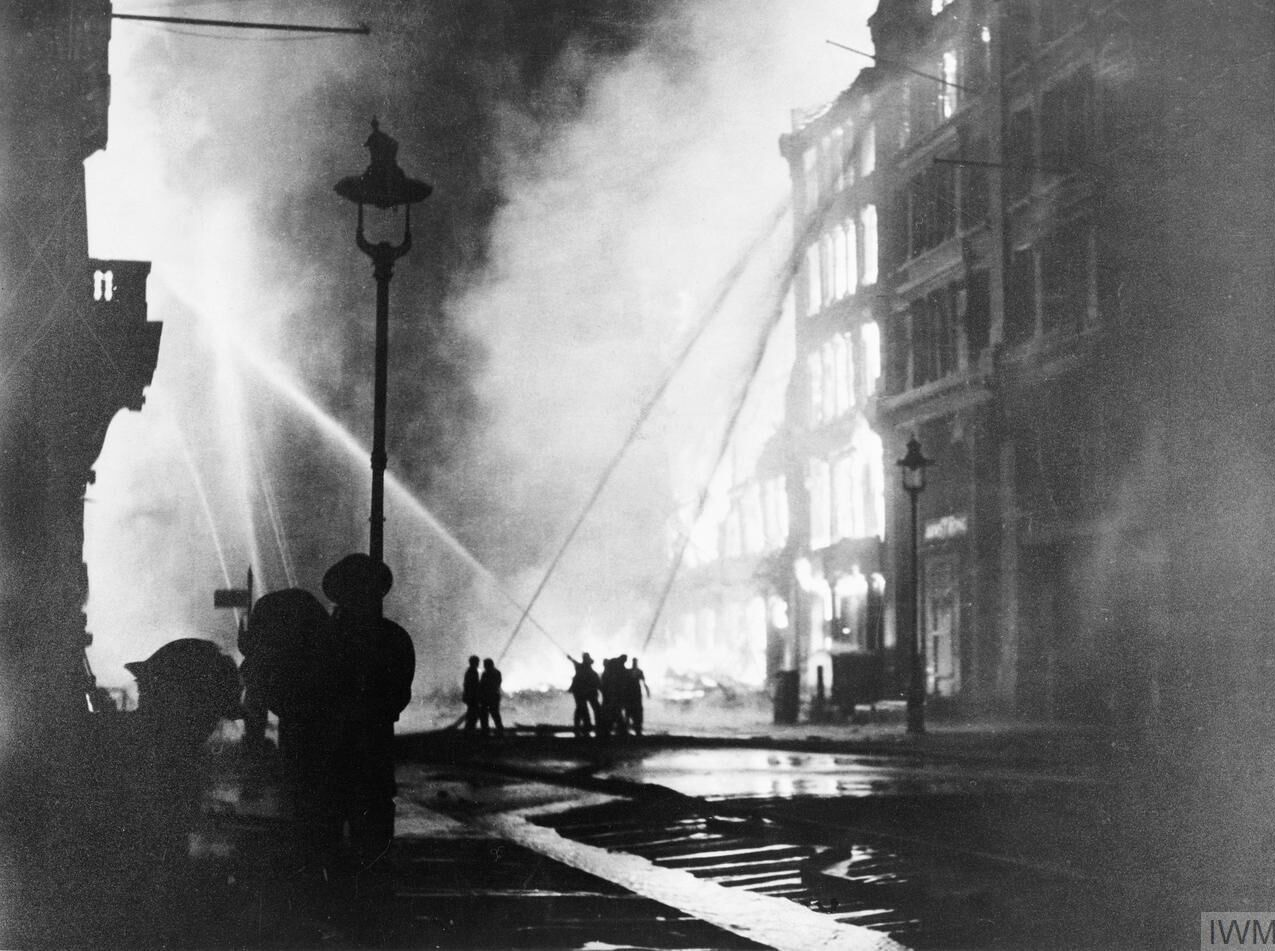
Firefighters at work amongst burning buildings, during the large raid of 10/11 May

In the north, substantial efforts were made against Newcastle-upon-Tyne and Sunderland, which were large ports on the English east coast. On 9 April 1941, Luftflotte 2 dropped 150 tons (152 t) of high explosives and 50,000 incendiaries from 120 bombers in a five-hour attack. Sewer, rail, docklands, and electric installations were damaged. In Sunderland on 25 April, Luftflotte 2 sent 60 bombers which dropped 80 tons (81.3 t) of high explosive and 9,000 incendiaries. Much damage was done. A further attack on the Clyde, this time at Greenock, took place on 6 and 7 May. However, as with the attacks in the south, the Germans failed to prevent maritime movements or cripple industry in the regions.

The last major attack on London was on 10/11 May 1941, on which the Luftwaffe flew 571 sorties and dropped 787 long tons (800 t) of bombs. This caused more than 2,000 fires; 1,436 people were killed and 1,792 seriously injured, which affected morale badly. Another raid was carried out on 11/12 May 1941. Westminster Abbey and the Law Courts were damaged, while the Chamber of the House of Commons was destroyed. One-third of London's streets were impassable. All but one railway station line was blocked for several weeks. This raid was significant, as 63 German fighters were sent with the bombers, indicating the growing effectiveness of RAF night fighter defences.

=== RAF night fighters ===
German air supremacy at night was also now under threat. British night-fighter operations out over the Channel were proving successful. This was not immediately apparent. The Bristol Blenheim F.1 carried four .303 in (7.7 mm) machine guns which lacked the firepower to easily shoot down a Do 17, Ju 88 or Heinkel He 111. The Blenheim had only a small speed advantage to overtake a German bomber in a stern-chase. Added to the fact an interception relied on visual sighting, a kill was most unlikely even in the conditions of a moonlit sky. The Boulton Paul Defiant, despite its poor performance during daylight engagements, was a much better night fighter. It was faster, able to catch the bombers and its configuration of four machine guns in a turret could (much like German night fighters in 1943–1945 with Schräge Musik) engage the German bomber from beneath. Attacks from below offered a larger target, compared to attacking tail-on, as well as a better chance of not being seen by the crew (so less chance of evasion), as well as greater likelihood of detonating its bomb load. In subsequent months a steady number of German bombers would fall to night fighters.

Improved aircraft designs were in the offing with the Bristol Beaufighter, then under development. It would prove formidable but its development was slow. The Beaufighter had a maximum speed of 320 mph (510 km/h), an operational ceiling of 26,000 ft (7,900 m), a climb rate of 2,500 ft (760 m) per minute, and its battery of four 20 mm (0.79 in) Hispano cannon and six .303 in Browning machine guns was much more lethal. On 19 November, John Cunningham of No. 604 Squadron RAF shot down a bomber flying an AI-equipped Beaufighter, the first air victory for the airborne radar. In November and December 1940, the Luftwaffe flew 9,000 sorties against British targets and RAF night fighters claimed only six shot down. In January 1941, Fighter Command flew 486 sorties against 1,965 made by the Germans. Just three and twelve were claimed by the RAF and AA defences respectively. In the bad weather of February 1941, Fighter Command flew 568 sorties to counter the Luftwaffe which flew 1,644 sorties. Night fighters could claim only four bombers for four losses.

By April and May 1941, the Luftwaffe was still getting through to their targets, taking no more than one- to two-percent losses per mission. On 19/20 April 1941, in honour of Hitler's 52nd birthday, 712 bombers hit Plymouth with a record 1,000 tons (1,016 t) of bombs. Losses were minimal. In the following month 22 German bombers were lost with 13 confirmed to have been shot down by night fighters. On 3/4 May nine were shot down in one night. On 10/11 May, London suffered severe damage, but 10 German bombers were downed. In May 1941, RAF night fighters shot down 38 German bombers. By the end of May, Kesselring's Luftflotte 2 had been withdrawn, leaving Hugo Sperrle's Luftflotte 3 as a token force to maintain the illusion of strategic bombing. Hitler now had his sights set on attacking the Soviet Union with Operation Barbarossa, and the Blitz came to an end.

== Aftermath ==
=== Luftwaffe losses ===
Between 20 June 1940, when the first German air operations began over Britain, and 31 March 1941, OKL recorded the loss of 2,265 aircraft over the British Isles, a quarter of them fighters and one-third bombers. At least 3,363 Luftwaffe aircrew were killed, 2,641 missing and 2,117 wounded. Total losses could have been as high as 600 bombers, just 1.5 percent of the sorties flown. A significant number of the aircraft not shot down after the resort to night bombing were wrecked during landings or crashed in bad weather.

=== Effectiveness of bombing ===
British output index, September 1940 – May 1941 (Note: Ministry of Supply index of output of warlike stores; baseline was the average output September–December 1939 and set at 100.)
Month	Output
1940
September	217
October	245
November	242
December	239
1941
January	244
February	266
March	303
April	284
May	319

The military effectiveness of bombing varied. The Luftwaffe dropped around 40,000 long tons (40,600 t) of bombs during the Blitz, which disrupted production and transport, reduced food supplies, and shook British morale. The bombing also helped to support the U-boat blockade by sinking some 58,000 long tons (58,900 t) of shipping and damaging 450,000 long tons (457,000 t) more. Despite the bombing, British production rose steadily throughout this period, although there were significant falls during April 1941, probably influenced by the departure of workers for Easter Holidays, according to the British official history. The official history volume British War Production (Postan, 1952) noted that the greatest effect on output of warlike stores was on the supply of components and dispersal of production rather than complete equipment.

In aircraft production, the British were denied the opportunity to reach the planned target of 2,500 aircraft in a month, arguably the greatest achievement of the bombing, as it forced the dispersal of the industry, at first because of damage to aircraft factories and then by a policy of precautionary dispersal. In April 1941, when the targets were British ports, rifle production fell by 25 percent, filled-shell production by 4.6 percent and in small-arms production 4.5 percent. The strategic impact on industrial cities was varied; most took from 10 to 15 days to recover from heavy raids, although Belfast and Liverpool took longer. The attacks against Birmingham took war industries some three months to recover fully. The exhausted population took three weeks to overcome the effects of an attack.

The air offensive against the RAF and British industry failed to have the desired effect. More might have been achieved had OKL exploited the vulnerability of British sea communications. The Allies did so later when Bomber Command attacked rail communications and the United States Army Air Forces targeted oil, but that would have required an economic-industrial analysis of which the Luftwaffe was incapable. OKL instead sought clusters of targets that suited the latest policy (which changed frequently), and disputes within the leadership were about tactics rather than strategy. Though militarily ineffective, the Blitz cost around 41,000 lives, may have injured another 139,000 people and did enormous damage to British infrastructure and housing stock. After the war, the Blitz spurred development as regulations were relaxed on bombed-out sites. This was estimated to have caused London's modern-day Gross Domestic Product to increase by 10% through agglomeration effects.

=== RAF evaluation ===
The British began to assess the impact of the Blitz in August 1941 and the RAF Air Staff used the German experience to improve Bomber Command's offensives. They concluded bombers should strike a single target each night and use more incendiaries because they had a greater impact on production than high explosives. They also noted regional production was severely disrupted when city centres were devastated through the loss of administrative offices, utilities and transport. They believed the Luftwaffe had failed in precision attack and concluded the German example of area attack using incendiaries was the way forward for operations over Germany.

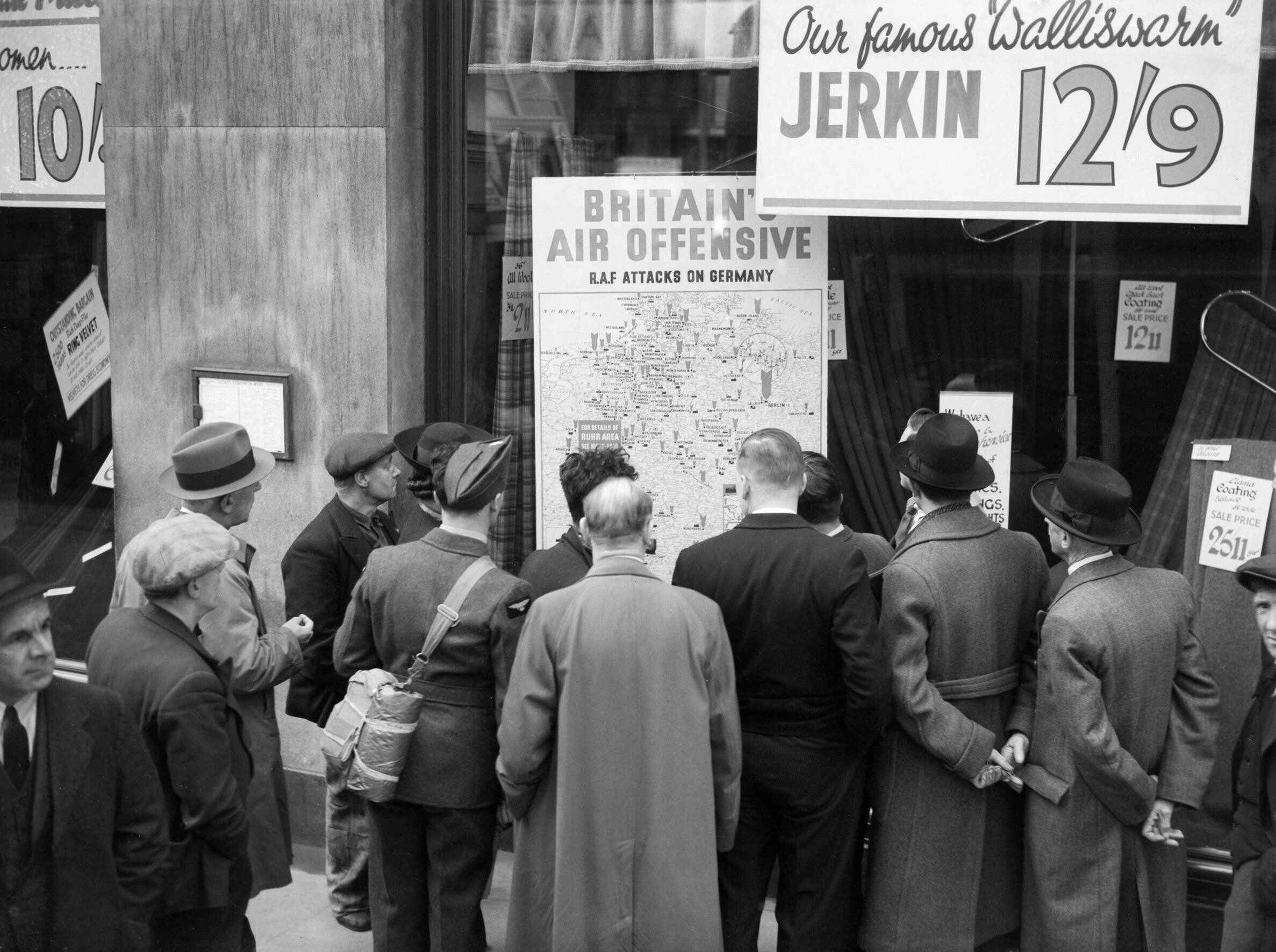
People in London look at a map illustrating how the RAF is striking back at Germany during 1940.

Some writers claim the Air Staff ignored a critical lesson, that British morale did not break and that attacking German morale was not sufficient to induce a collapse. Aviation strategists dispute that morale was ever a major consideration for Bomber Command. Throughout 1933–1939 none of the 16 Western Air Plans drafted mentioned morale as a target. The first three directives in 1940 did not mention civilian populations or morale in any way. Morale was not mentioned until the ninth wartime directive on 21 September 1940. The 10th directive in October 1940 mentioned morale by name but industrial cities were only to be targeted if weather prevented raids on oil targets.

The AOC Bomber Command, Arthur Harris, who did see German morale as an objective, did not believe that the morale collapse could occur without the destruction of the German economy. The primary goal of Bomber Command was to destroy the German industrial base (economic warfare) and in doing so reduce morale. In late 1943, just before the Battle of Berlin, Harris declared the power of Bomber Command would enable it to achieve "a state of devastation in which surrender is inevitable". A summary of Harris' strategic intentions was clear:

From 1943 to the end of the war, he [Harris] and other proponents of the area offensive represented it [the bomber offensive] less as an attack on morale than as an assault on the housing, utilities, communications, and other services that supported the war production effort.

— Hall

In comparison to the Allied bombing campaign against Germany, casualties due to the Blitz were relatively low; the bombing of Hamburg alone inflicted about 40,000 civilian casualties.

== Legacy, propaganda and memory ==
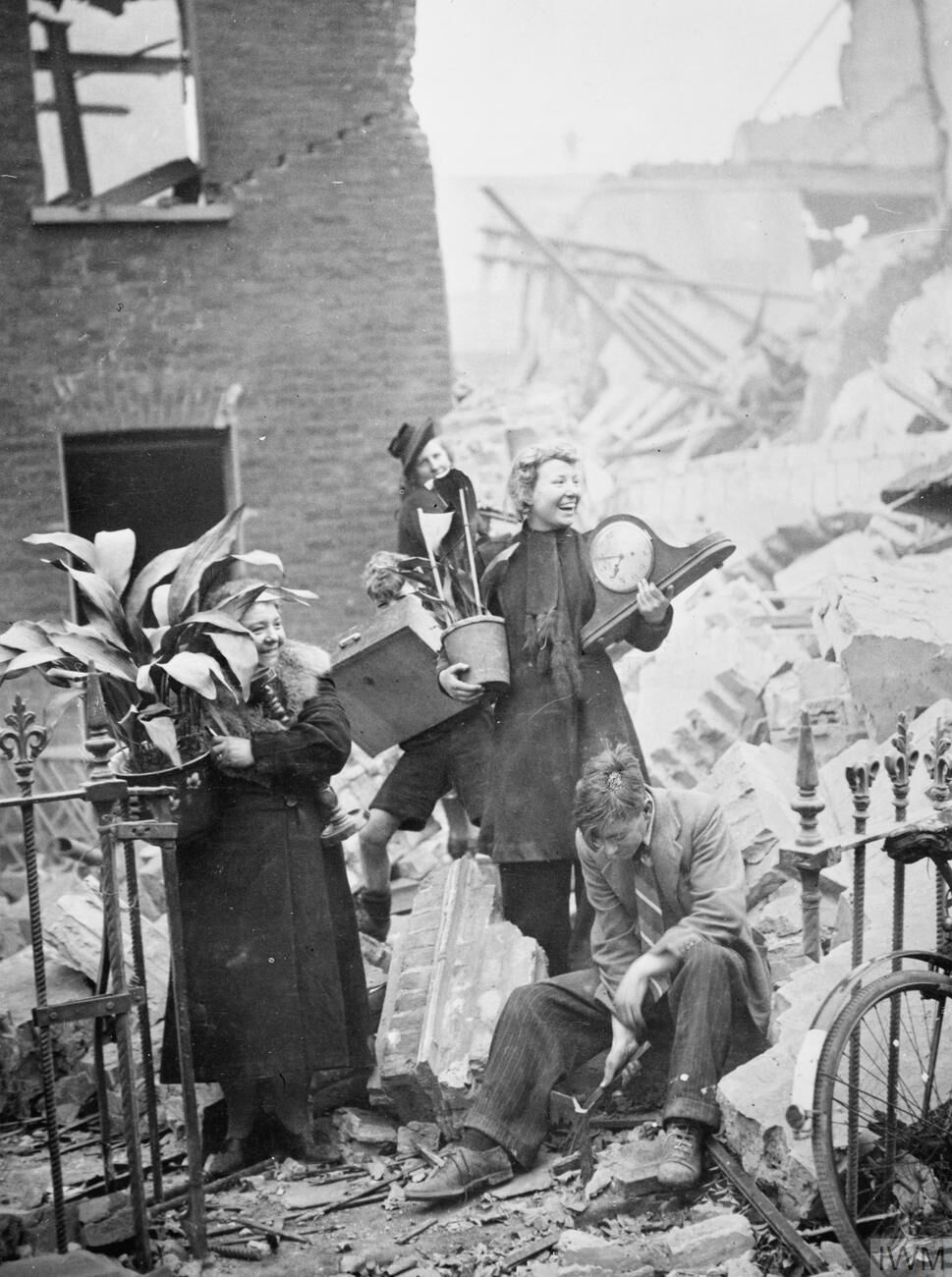
Women salvaging possessions from their bombed house, including plants and a clock

A popular image arose of British people in the Second World War: a collection of people locked in national solidarity. This image entered the historiography of the Second World War in the 1980s and 1990s, especially after the publication of Angus Calder's book The Myth of the Blitz (1991). It was evoked by both the right and left political factions in Britain in 1982, during the Falklands War when it was portrayed in a nostalgic narrative in which the Second World War represented patriotism actively and successfully acting as a defender of democracy. This imagery of people in the Blitz was embedded via being in film, radio, newspapers and magazines. At the time it was seen as a useful propaganda tool for domestic and foreign consumption. Historians' critical response to this construction focused on what were seen as overemphasised claims of patriotic nationalism and national unity. In The Myth of the Blitz, Calder exposed some of the counter-evidences of anti-social and divisive behaviours. What he saw as the myth—serene national unity—became "historical truth". In particular, class division was most evident during the Blitz.

Raids during the Blitz produced the greatest divisions and morale effects in the working-class areas, with lack of sleep, insufficient shelters and inefficiency of warning systems being major causes. The loss of sleep was a particular factor, with many not bothering to attend inconvenient shelters. The Communist Party made political capital out of these difficulties. In the wake of the Coventry Blitz, there was widespread agitation from the Communist Party over the need for bomb-proof shelters. Many Londoners, in particular, took to using the Underground railway system, without authority, for shelter and sleeping through the night. So worried were the government over the sudden campaign of leaflets and posters distributed by the Communist Party in Coventry and London, that the police were sent to seize their production facilities. The government up until November 1940 was opposed to the centralised organisation of shelter. Home Secretary Sir John Anderson was replaced by Morrison soon afterwards, in the wake of a Cabinet reshuffle as the dying Neville Chamberlain resigned. Morrison warned that he could not counter the Communist unrest unless provision of shelters was made. He recognised the right of the public to seize tube stations and authorised plans to improve their condition and expand them by tunnelling. Still, many British citizens, who had been members of the Labour Party, itself inert over the issue, turned to the Communist Party. The Communists attempted to blame the damage and casualties of the Coventry raid on the rich factory owners, big business and landowning interests and called for a negotiated peace. Though they failed to make a large gain in influence, the membership of the Party had doubled by June 1941. The "Communist threat" was deemed important enough for Herbert Morrison to order, with the support of the Cabinet, the cessation of activities of the Daily Worker, the Communist newspaper.

The brief success of the Communists was exploited by the British Union of Fascists (BUF). Antisemitic attitudes became widespread, particularly in London. Rumours that Jewish support was underpinning the Communist surge were frequent. Rumours that Jews were inflating prices, were responsible for the black market, were the first to panic under attack (or even the cause of the panic), and secured the best shelters via underhanded methods, were also widespread. There was also minor ethnic antagonism between the small Black, Indian and Jewish communities, but despite this these tensions quietly and quickly subsided. In other cities, class divisions became more evident. Over a quarter of London's population had left the city by November 1940. Civilians left for more remote areas of the country. Upsurges in population in South Wales and Gloucester intimated where these displaced people went. Other factors, including industry dispersal, may have been important. However, resentment of rich self-evacuees and hostile treatment of poor ones were signs of persistence of class resentments, although these factors did not appear to threaten social order. The total number of evacuees numbered 1.4 million, including a high proportion from the poorest inner-city families. Reception committees were completely unprepared for the condition of some of the children. Far from displaying the nation's unity in times of war, the scheme backfired, often aggravating class antagonism and bolstering prejudice about the urban poor. Within four months, 88 percent of evacuated mothers, 86 percent of small children, and 43 percent of schoolchildren had been returned home. The lack of bombing in the Phoney War contributed significantly to the return of people to the cities, but class conflict was not eased a year later when evacuation operations had to be put into effect again.

On the other hand, some historians have recently contended that this revisionism of the "Blitz spirit" narrative may have been an over-correction. These include Peter Hennessy, Andrew Thorpe and Philip Ziegler, who, while admitting serious exceptions, argue that the population largely behaved well during the Blitz.

There is much that Londoners can look back on with pride, remarkably little about which they need to feel ashamed.

— Philip Ziegler, London At War (1995) p. 340

=== Bomb site rubble ===
In one six-month period 750,000 tons (762,000 t) of bomb site rubble from London was transported by railway on 1,700 goods trains to make runways on Bomber Command airfields in East Anglia. Bomb site rubble from Birmingham was used to make runways on US Air Force bases in Kent and Essex in southeast England. Many sites of bombed buildings, when cleared of rubble, were cultivated to grow vegetables to ease wartime food shortages and were known as victory gardens.

=== Novels ===
According to Edward Quinn, Elizabeth Bowen's novel The Heat of the Day (1948) takes place during the "first heady autumn of the London air raids". The protagonist, Stella Rodney, meets her lover Robert, and their relationship is shaped by the historical context in which it takes place. The novel's powerful depiction of this era, marked by the camaraderie that arose during the Blitz and the constant threat of death, adds depth to its exploration of the theme of treason. Bowen's writing captures the poignant moments of strangers bidding each other farewell on street corners, as they hope to survive the night and not be forgotten. Overall, the novel's strength lies in its ability to transport readers to a specific time and place and make them feel the weight of historical events on the characters' lives. Likewise Bowen's short story Demon Lovers is a powerful evocation of the disturbing and often uncanny experiences of lives lived under conditions of blackout and bombardment.

=== Poetry ===
The Welsh poet Dylan Thomas had first-hand experience of the Blitz whilst working in London for Strand Films on morale-boosting documentary films for the Ministry of Information. His lived experience of bombing raids and fire storms were given powerful expression in poems he wrote at the time, notably elegies for an elderly man - Among Those Killed in a Dawn Raid Was a Man Aged a Hundred (1941) - and for child victims of incendiary bombing raids in Ceremony After a Fire Raid (1944) and A Refusal to Mourn the Death, by Fire, of a Child in London (1945). They were collected in Deaths and Entrances, a volume of his poetry published in 1946. The sentiments expressed in his war poems were, according to Professor Walford Davies, representative of "the real temper of the British people of the time - the resilience and the guts".

The poet T.S.Eliot served as an air raid warden on night-watch during the London Blitz. Referring to the 1942 poem he would publish as the last poem of his Four Quartets, he wrote to his editor: "We had to watch the fires and report them as quickly as they occurred. You will be interested to know that the lines from Little Gidding came out of this experience." Stephen Spender served as a volunteer AFS fireman in north London during the war during which he wrote his poem Air Raid (1941). Ecco Homo by David Gascoyne and Brother Fire by Louis MacNeice have been cited as poetic responses to the experience of the Blitz reflecting apocalyptic religiosity and Marxist schadenfreude respectively. Hilda Doolittle, who wrote poetry as H.D., conveyed her experiences of the London Blitz in the poem The Walls Do Not Fall (1944) where they are set alongside historical examples of besieged cities. The Welsh poet Vernon Watkins wrote directly out of his experience of the Swansea Blitz of 1941 in poems such as The Spoils of War and The Broken Sea (Souls numbered their days/Between night and morning...).

=== Film ===
Blitz is a 2024 film produced and directed by Steve McQueen. In a graphic representation of the Blitz on London, set over a period of three nights in September 1940, the themes of patriotism, communal solidarity and resilience as well as moments of mental terror across gender, race and class are all explored in a manner which questions the "patriotic myth" of the "Blitz Spirit" in the prevailing historical imagination.

=== Art ===
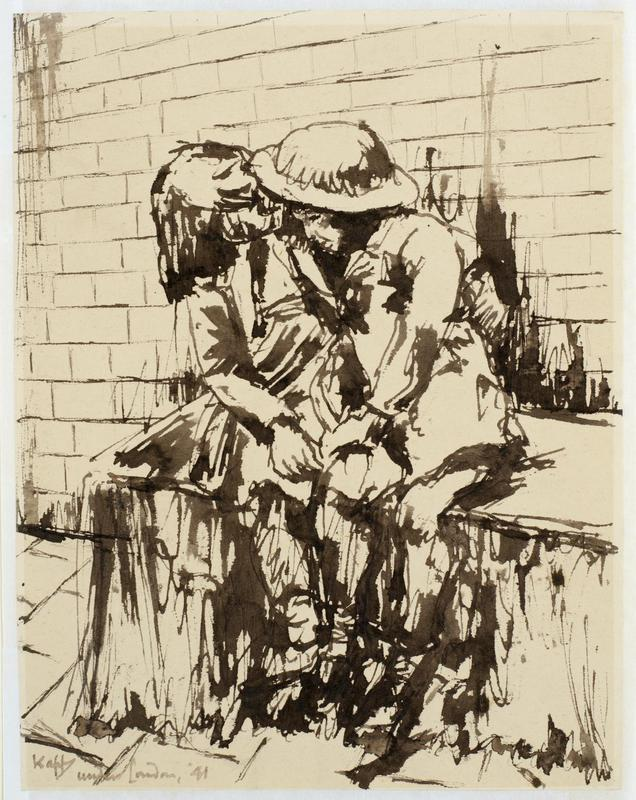
A Brother and Sister Sheltering in the Underground, 1941, (Art.IWM ART LD 795), by Edmond Xavier Kapp

In 1942 Oxford University Press published War Pictures by British Artists: Blitz showcasing the work of official war artists who had been commissioned by the War Artists' Advisory Committee as part of a government sponsored project to compile a comprehensive and permanent artistic record of Britain and its people during the war. In 1945 their work was displayed at an exhibition held at the Burlington House in London. In Swansea the same year a portfolio of 36 paintings of the devastated town by local artist Will Evans was exhibited at the Glynn Vivian Art Gallery.

=== Archive audio recordings ===
In recent years a large number of wartime recordings relating to the Blitz have been made available on audiobooks such as The Blitz, The Home Front, and British War Broadcasting. These collections include period interviews with civilians, servicemen, aircrew, politicians and Civil Defence personnel, as well as Blitz actuality recordings, news bulletins and public information broadcasts. Notable interviews include Thomas H. Alderson, the first recipient of the George Cross, John Cormack, who survived eight days trapped beneath rubble on Clydeside, and Herbert Morrison's famous "Britain shall not burn" appeal for more fireguards in December 1940.

== Tables ==
=== Bombing raid statistics ===
Below is a table by city of the number of major raids (where at least 100 tons of bombs were dropped) and tonnage of bombs dropped during these major raids. Smaller raids are not included in the tonnages.

Big raids and combined bomb tonnage
City	Tons	Raids
London	18,291	71
Liverpool/ Merseyside	1,957	8
Birmingham	1,852	8
Glasgow/ Clydeside	1,329	5
Plymouth	1,228	8
Bristol	919	6
Coventry	818	2
Portsmouth	687	3
Southampton	647	4
Hull	593	3
Manchester	578	3
Belfast	440	2
Sheffield	355	2
Sunderland	155	1
Nottingham	137	1
Cardiff	115	1
Swansea	89	3
Exeter	75	19

=== Sorties flown ===
The Blitz: estimated Luftwaffe bomber sorties
Month/year	Day sorties (losses)	Night sorties (losses)	Luftflotte 2 sorties	Luftflotte 3 sorties	Major attacks	Heavy attacks
October 1940	2,300 (79)	5,900 (23)	2,400	3,500	25	4
November 1940	925 (65)	6,125 (48)	1,600	4,525	23	2
December 1940	650 (24)	3,450 (44)	700	2,750	11	5
January 1941	675 (7)	2,050 (22)	450	1,600	7	6
February 1941	500 (9)	1,450 (18)	475	975	–	2
March 1941	800 (8)	4,275 (46)	1,625	2,650	12	3
April 1941	800 (9)	5,250 (58)	1,500	3,750	16	5
May 1941	200 (3)	3,800 (55)	1,300	2,500	11	3

== See also ==
- 1941 Old Palace School bombing
- Baedeker Blitz
- Big Week
- Bombing of Dresden
- Bombing of Darmstadt in World War II
- Bombing of Dublin in World War II
- Bombing of Wiener Neustadt in World War II
- London in World War II
- Operation Steinbock
- Operation Gisela
- V-1 flying bomb
- V-2 rocket
- The Heat of the Day, 1948 novel about the Blitz by Elizabeth Bowen
