= 86th (East Anglian) (Hertfordshire Yeomanry) Field Regiment, Royal Artillery =

86th (East Anglian) (Hertfordshire Yeomanry) Field Regiment, RA 286 (Hertfordshire Yeomanry) Field Regiment, RA
- Royal Artillery cap badge
- Active: March 1920–1 April 1967
- Country: United Kingdom
- Branch: Territorial Army
- Type: Yeomanry
- Role: Field artillery
- Size: 2–4 Batteries
- Part of: 54th (East Anglian) Division; 42nd Armoured Division; XXX Corps
- Garrison/HQ: Yeomanry House, Hertford
- Engagements: D Day; Operation Epsom; Operation Goodwood; Operation Bluecoat; Liberation of Antwerp; Operation Market Garden; Operation Clipper; Operations Veritable and Blockbuster; Operation Plunder; Invasion of Germany

Commanders
- Notable commanders: Geoffrey Lawrence, 1st Baron Oaksey, DSO; Sir Geoffrey Church, 2nd Baronet, MC; Sir Patrick Coghill, 6th Baronet; Lt-Col G.D. Fanshawe, DSO, OBE

Insignia
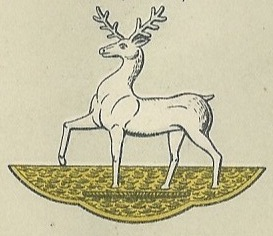
- Hertfordshire Yeomanry collar and beret badge

The 86th (East Anglian) (Hertfordshire Yeomanry) Field Regiment, Royal Artillery, was a unit of Britain's part-time Territorial Army (TA) formed after World War I from existing artillery and Yeomanry Cavalry units recruited in Hertfordshire. Its self-propelled guns were among the first artillery to land in Normandy on D Day and served throughout the North West Europe campaign in World War II, seeing action in Normandy, at the liberation of Antwerp, in Operations Market Garden, Clipper and Veritable, the Rhine crossing and the advance across Germany. The regiment continued in the postwar TA until 1967, and its successor battery continued to 2014.

== Origin ==
The Hertfordshire Yeomanry was a cavalry unit of Britain's part-time Territorial Force (TF), which had served in World War I. When the TF was reconstituted on 7 February 1920 only the 14 most senior Yeomanry regiments remained horsed, the other 39 being re-roled, generally as artillery. In March 1920 the Hertfordshire Yeomanry converted to the Royal Field Artillery (RFA) and amalgamated with the 1st and 2nd Hertfordshire Batteries of the 4th East Anglian Brigade, RFA, to form a new 3rd East Anglian Brigade, RFA. (Note: In the Royal Artillery prior to 1938 a brigade was a lieutenant-colonel's command consisting of independent batteries 'brigaded' together; it was not comparable with an infantry or cavalry brigade commanded by a brigadier-general. In the Territorials, unlike the Regulars, unit heritage is carried by the brigade/regiment, rather than the battery.) The Yeomanry component supplied 3rd and 4th Hertfordshire Batteries. (The remainder of 4th (EA) Brigade, the Northamptonshire Battery, joined the 1st East Anglian Brigade, see below.) When the TF was reorganised as the Territorial Army in 1921 the new 3rd Brigade was designated as 86th (East Anglian) Brigade, RFA, changing the following year to 86th (East Anglian) (Hertfordshire Yeomanry) Brigade, RFA, with the following organisation and locations: (Note: Prior to World War I the HQs of the Hertfordshire Yeomanry and 4th (EA) Bde, RFA, had shared the site at St Andrew Street, Hertford; the Yeomanry squadrons at St Albans and Watford moved to join the artillery batteries at their existing drill halls.)

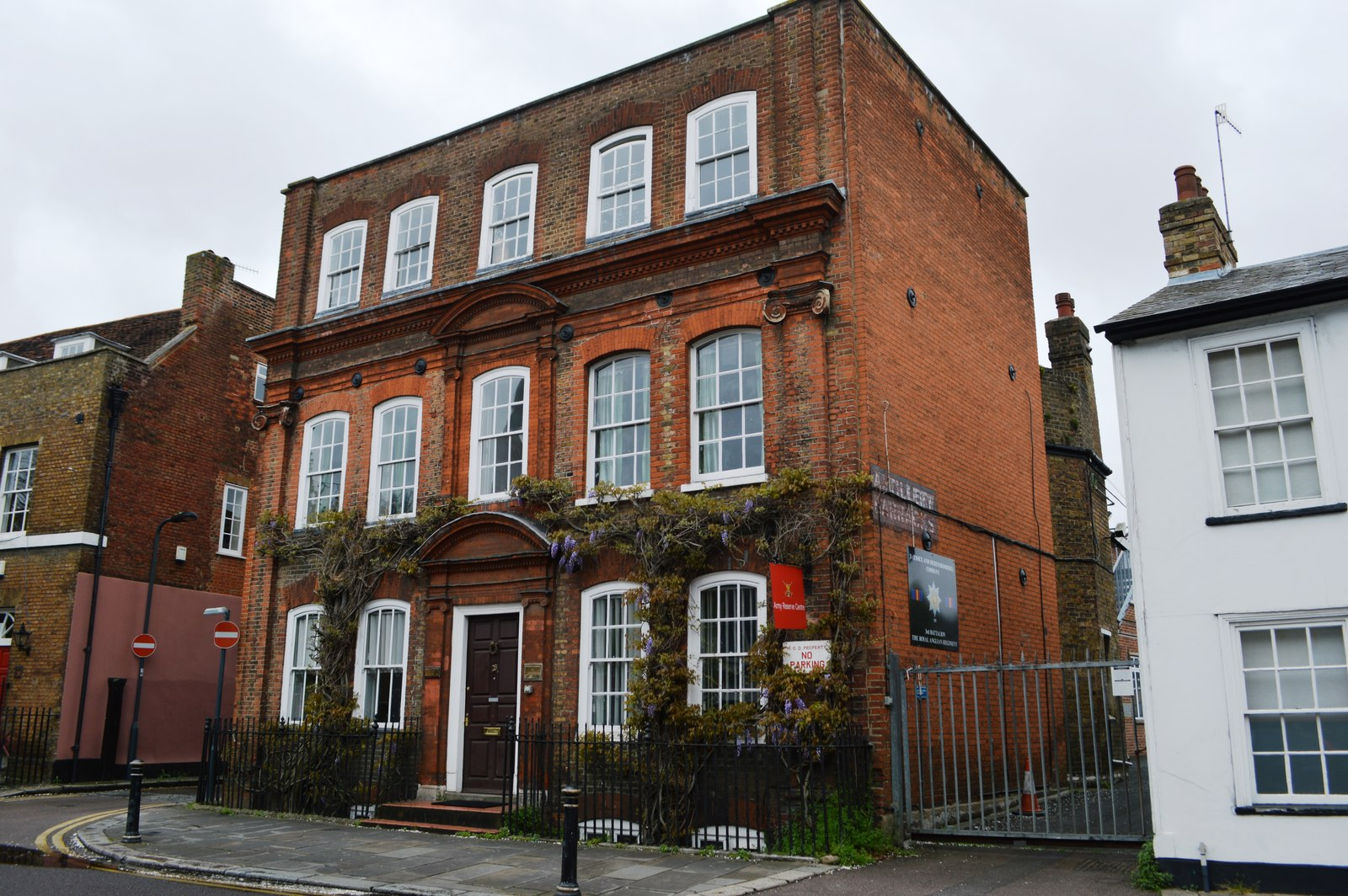
Yeomanry House, Hertford.

- Headquarters (HQ) at 27 St Andrew Street, Hertford (later known as Yeomanry House)
- 341 (Hertfordshire) Battery at Riding School, Harpenden Road, St Albans
- 342 (Hertfordshire) Battery at Hertford
- 343 (Hertfordshire) Battery at Clarendon Hall, Watford
- 344 (Hertfordshire) Battery (Howitzer) at Bearton Camp, Hitchin

It had been intended that only two of the batteries would carry the Hertfordshire Yeomanry subtitle, but the first commanding officer (CO), Col Geoffrey Lawrence, had served with the RFA during the war (in 2nd East Anglian Brigade) and ensured that the RFA experience within the brigade was spread among the yeomanry batteries as well, while all four batteries adopted the yeomanry badge.

== Equipment and training ==
The establishment of a TA RFA brigade was four 4-gun horsedrawn batteries, three of the batteries equipped with 18-pounder guns and one with 4.5-inch howitzers, all of World War I patterns. Recruitment to the Hertfordshire brigade was initially slow, hampered by the transfer of most of the officers and men to the short-lived Defence Force established in 1921 in response to a coal miners' strike (as 86th Brigade, RFA (Defence Force)). After the Defence Force was stood down in July, the brigade attended its first annual training camp.

The RFA was subsumed into the Royal Artillery on 1 June 1924, the units becoming 'Field Brigades' and 'Field Batteries' respectively. 86th (HY) Field Bde formed part of the TA's 54th (East Anglian) Division. The brigade also had an affiliated section of 54th Divisional Signals, Royal Corps of Signals.

Partial mechanisation of the brigade began in July 1927, with 343 and 344 Btys replacing their horses with hired Morris Commercial Series D six-wheeled lorries acting as gun tractors. However, the iron-tyred wooden wheels of the guns were not replaced, and towing speed was restricted to 8 miles (13 km) per hour. 344 Battery reached the finals of the annual King's Cup TA artillery competition that year – the only mechanised battery to do so – and won the trophy, despite one gun tractor overturning on the way to the competition leaving one gun with an improvised crew due to the injuries. In the 1930s the guns were towed at annual camp by lorries supplied by the Royal Army Service Corps (RASC), but these were unsuitable. Later each battery was allocated one gun tractor and was made up to strength with RASC vehicles for annual camps. The brigade's first fully mechanised camp was held in 1933. In the late 1930s the UK began re-arming, and in 1937 it was announced that TA artillery units would progressively be issued with up-to-date guns and vehicles. This began with the fitting of pneumatic tyres to the old 18-pdrs and 4.5-inch howitzers, and 86th (HY) Fd Bde was selected to have one 18-pdr battery converted to 4.5-inch: 342 Bty was chosen, and its 18-pdrs were withdrawn for conversion to 18/25-pounders. A few Morris CDSW gun tractors were issued to TA batteries in early 1939.

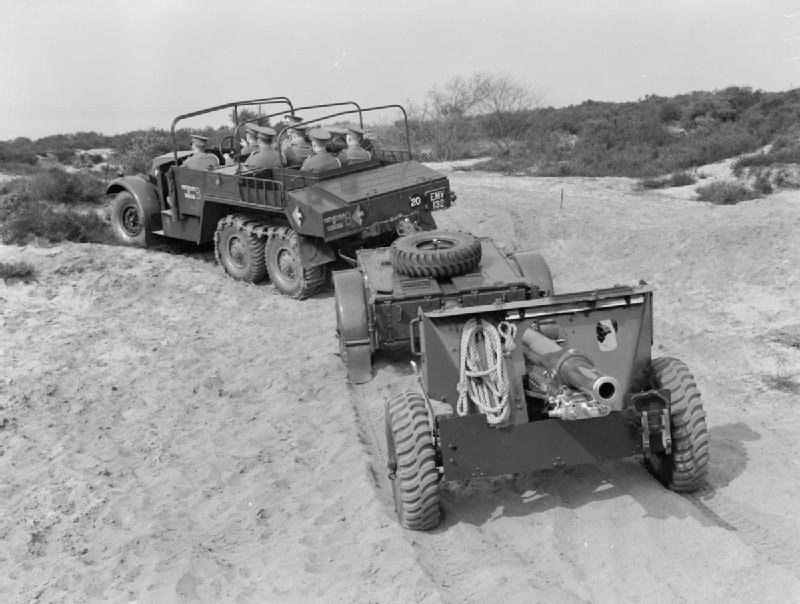
A modernised 18-pdr Mark V gun being towed by a Morris tractor in 1938.

The four batteries unofficially adopted local names in 1930, but it was not until August 1937 that these titles were made official:

- 341 (St Albans) Field Bty
- 342 (Hertford) Field Bty
- 343 (Watford) Field Bty
- 344 (Hitchin) Field Bty (How)

The RA updated its nomenclature in 1938, with 'Regiment' replacing 'Brigade' for a lieutenant-colonel's command; the TA field artillery adopted the new designation on 1 November.

== World War II ==
=== Mobilisation ===
The TA was doubled in size after the Munich Crisis, and most regiments formed duplicates. The Hertfordshire Yeomanry actually contributed to three new regiments by 1942. The process began on 1 November 1938 when 86th (HY) Fd Rgt split off 343 (Watford) Bty to form 79th (Hertfordshire Yeomanry) Heavy Anti-Aircraft Regiment. This regiment served in the Battle of France and the personnel were evacuated from western France almost three weeks after the Dunkirk evacuation had ended. It was in Anti-Aircraft Command during the Blitz and then served in the Tunisian and Italian campaigns.

Next, 86th (HY) Fd Rgt split off 344 (Hitchin) Bty, which together with 336 (Northamptonshire) Bty of 84th (1st East Anglian) Field Brigade (see above) began forming 135th Field Regiment at Hitchin. This process was still going on when war was declared on 3 September 1939; 135th Field Rgt became fully independent on 7 September. 135th Field Rgt maintained Hertfordshire Yeomanry traditions, but the '(East Anglian) (Hertfordshire Yeomanry)' subtitles were only authorised after the regiment had been captured at the Fall of Singapore in February 1942. Many of the regiment's Prisoners of War served on the notorious Burma Railway.

Part of the reorganisation was that field regiments changed from a war establishment of four six-gun batteries to two batteries, each of three four-gun troops. 86th (HY) Field Rgt struggled with various rearrangements of its batteries, but on the outbreak of war it was organised as follows:

- Regimental Headquarters (RHQ)
- 341 (St Albans) Battery (A, B, C Trps) – 4.5-inch howitzers
- 342 (Hertford) Battery (D, E, F Trps)

=== Home defence ===
86th (East Anglian) (Hertfordshire Yeomanry) Fd Rgt mobilised as part of 54th (EA) Division on 1 September 1939, two days before the declaration of war. It was commanded by Lt-Col Sir Patrick Coghill, 6th Baronet. Its former CO, Brigadier Sir Geoffrey Church, 2nd Baronet, was commander, RA, of 54th (EA) Division. About three weeks after mobilisation the regiment was brought up to its full establishment strength with a draft of 'Army Class I' Miltiamen. Training continued at the drill halls, with the men billeted nearby, then on 20 October advance parties set out to Leicestershire where it was planned that 54th (EA) Division would concentrate for training and re-equipment. However, the division was unexpectedly diverted to the East Coast as one of the 'Julius Caesar' anti-invasion defence formations. 86th (HY) Field Rgt was ordered to detach a battery of two troops to act independently under 163 Infantry Bde at Redgrave Hall in Suffolk. 341 Battery went with its eight 4.5-inch howitzers (the only serviceable guns the regiment had at the time; there were four others classified 'DP' – for drill purposes only). On 5 November it was deployed 20 miles (32 km) closer to the coast, at Westleton, to cover possible landings at Dunwich, while 342 Bty took over Redgrave Hall (later at Sudbourne Hall, Orford), with RHQ at Yoxford. Through the winter the two batteries alternated in manning the guns at Westleton. A further draft of 150 'Army Class II' militiamen, mainly from Hertfordshire, arrived in December and a joint training battery was established at Redgrave Hall for them and the militiamen of 85th (East Anglian) Fd Rgt. With the regiment now over establishment, it was ordered to supply a cadre to form a new regiment, but this was cancelled.

54th (East Anglian) Division's formation sign, adopted in the Spring of 1940.

The regiment handed over its forward deployment at Westleton in February 1940 and went into billets in Chelmsford. Then 54th (EA) Division moved to Northumberland, advance parties leaving on 30 March and the rest of the regiment by train on 6 April. RHQ and the Light Aid Detachment (LAD) of the Royal Army Ordnance Corps were billeted at Whalton, 341 Bty occupied Belsay Castle and 342 Bty Capheaton Hall. The 'Phoney War' ended on 10 May with the German invasion of the Low Countries; the regiment began anti-paratroop patrols and was placed under 6 hours' notice to move. To make best use of the resources, the five remaining serviceable 4.5s were concentrated in 342 Bty and 341 Bty became a rifle battery. The regimental signal section joined, having been under training with 54th Divisional Signals. The regiment received its first four 18/25-pounders on 6 June (these hybrids comprised a modern 25-pdr gun mounted on a converted 18-pdr carriage). The regiment carried out some field firing, and the LAD worked on the 'DP' guns to make them fit for firing.

By now the British Expeditionary Force (BEF) had been evacuated from Dunkirk without its equipment. Anti-invasion defence became a priority and 86th (HY) Fd Rgt was concentrated at Linden Hall, Longhorsley, near Morpeth to be closer to the shore. However, its 4.5s were taken away to be employed as single beach defence guns, and the need to re-equip the BEF's units led to an acute shortage of guns. In August two troops were each given two 60-pounder medium guns (reportedly World War I 'trophy guns' retrieved from public parks in Scotland) and at the end of the month eight World War I French M1897 75mm field guns arrived from the US under Lend-Lease. 86th (HY) Field Rgt exchanged a group of about 50 officers and other ranks with 19th Fd Rgt, a regular unit returned from Dunkirk, in order to spread its battle experience. By the beginning of October the regiment was deployed as follows:

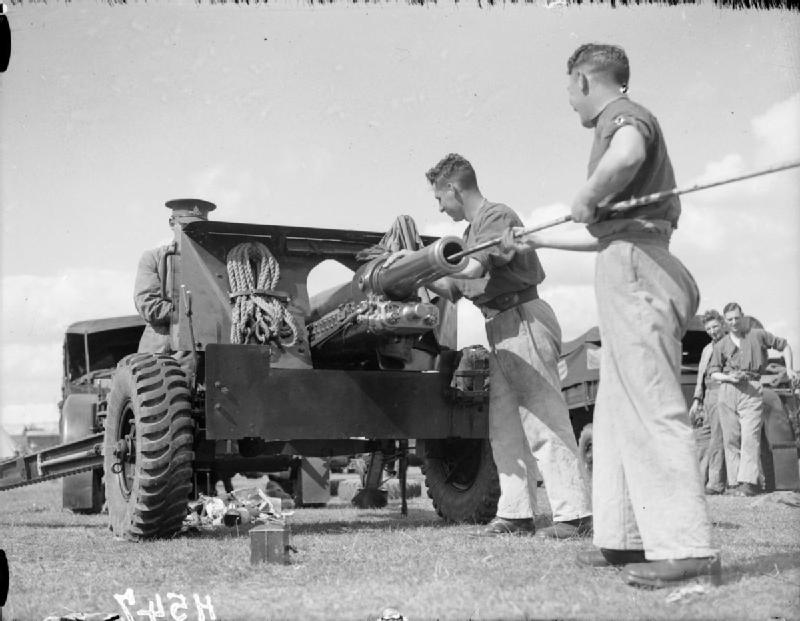
Gunners sponging out an 18/25-pounder Mk V P during exercises in the UK.

- RHQ – Acton House, Felton
- LAD and B Echelon – Campbell's Farm, Old Felton
- 341 Bty
  - BHQ – Widdrington Station
  - A Trp (4 × 75mm) – Northsteads Farm
  - B Trp (2 × 60-pdr) – Ulgham Park
  - C Trp (4 × 75mm) – Houndalee Farm
- 342 Bty
  - BHQ – Eastfield Hall
  - D Trp (2 × 60-pdr) – Easthouses Farm, under command 341 Bty
  - E Trp (4 × 18/25-pdr) – Eastfield Hall
  - F Trp (4 × 18/25-pdr) – Swarland, under command 162 Infantry Bde Mobile Column

Shortly afterwards the four 60-pdrs were handed back, resulting in two troops being without guns, but the first of the new Quad gun tractors arrived, together with Universal Carriers to act as armoured observation posts (OPs). The need for armoured OPs was one of the lessons learned from the Battle of France. Another was that the two-battery organisation did not work: field regiments were intended to support an infantry brigade of three battalions. As a result, field regiments were reorganised into three 8-gun batteries, but it was not until late 1940 that the RA had enough trained battery staffs to carry out the reorganisation. 86th (HY) Field Rgt formed its third battery on 18 November 1940; at first this was unofficially known as '343 Bty', following the old Watford battery, but was officially numbered 462 Bty on 18 January 1941. The troops were rearranged such that the new battery consisted of E and F Trps. By now the troops of 341 Bty (A and B) each had 4 × 75mm guns, while the other troops all had 4 × 18/25-pdrs.

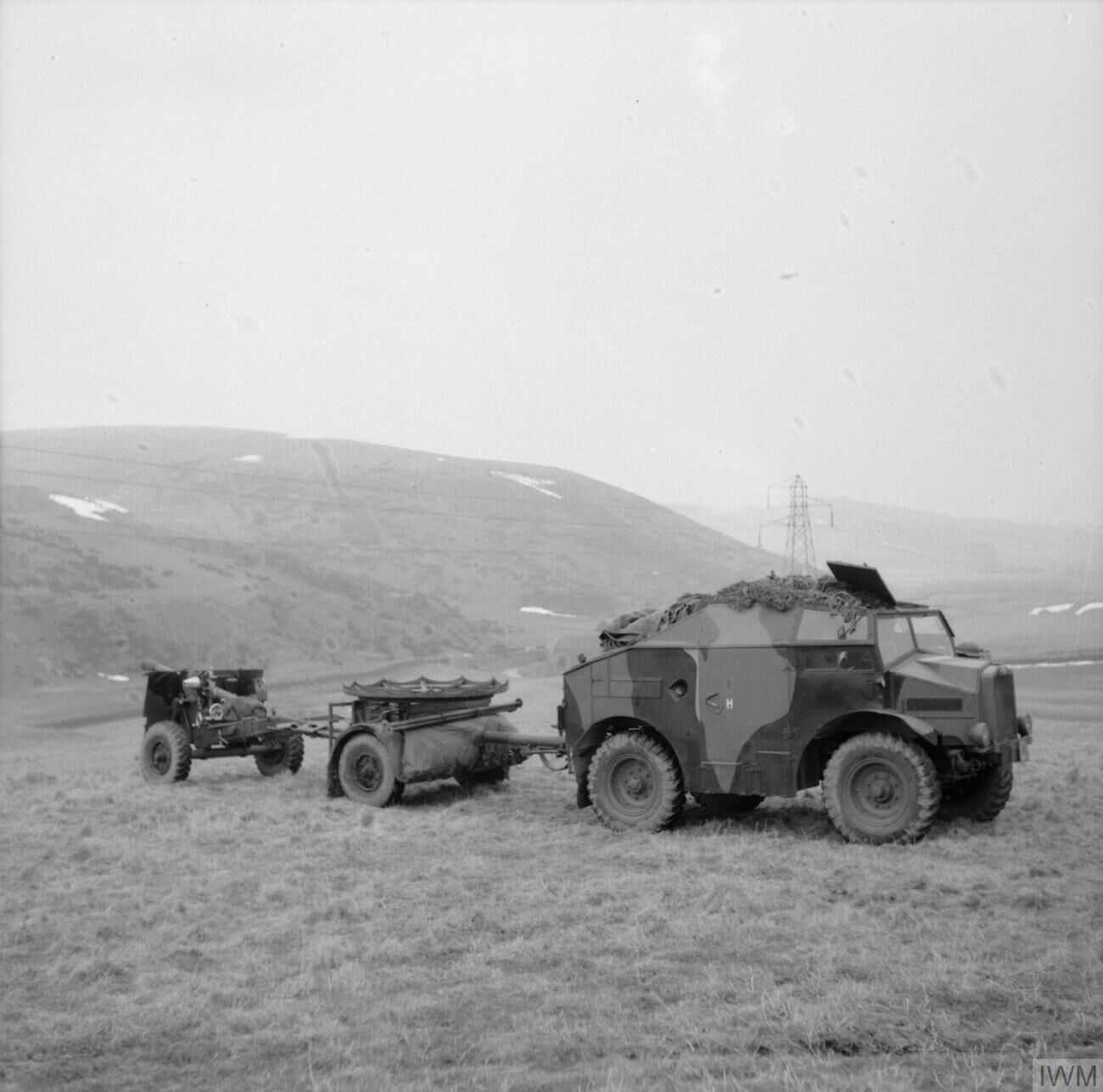
25-pounder gun and Quad gun tractor on exercise in the UK, March 1941.

In March 1941 54th (EA) Division left its coast defence role and moved to Gloucestershire to come under GHQ Reserve; 86th (HY) Fd Rgt was billeted in the Tewkesbury area. Sir Patrick Coghill left for an oversea appointment and Lt-Col R.S. Wade took over as CO on 28 May. Mobile training began in July, when the regiment left Tewkesbury and alternated between divisional exercises and artillery practice camps on Salisbury Plain and at Sennybridge. In between, it was housed at a tented camp at High Wycombe in Buckinghamshire. 54th (EA) Division participated in 'Exercise Bumper', with 86th (HY) Fd Rgt under 162 Bde acting as part of the 'invading force'. In November 1941 the division returned to its coast defence role in East Anglia under XI Corps, with 86th (HY) Fd Rgt in support of 163 Bde, which was responsible for beach defence from Dunwich to Aldeburgh; RHQ was re-established at Yoxford. In January 1942 Lt-Col Wade was replaced by Lt-Col G.D. Fanshawe, who had been the regiment's Regular Army adjutant before the war. It also began receiving its 25-pdr Mk II guns.

With no immediate prospect of overseas service, 54th (EA) Division was placed on a lower establishment in January 1942 and it became a source of men and units for other parts of the field force. When 42nd Armoured Division required a second field regiment, 86th (HY) Fd Rgt was assigned to it on 10 June, and moved to Hovingham and Slingsby, North Yorkshire. On exercises with the division's armour, regimental OP parties were now mounted in tanks. On 21 December the division's two field regiments, 86th (HY) and 147th (Essex Yeomanry) provided the cadres to form a new 191st (Hertfordshire and Essex Yeomanry) Fd Rgt. Most of 462 Bty was transferred to form 533 Bty of the new regiment and was reformed with a large number of replacements. 86th (HY) Field Rgt then moved into winter quarters in Scarborough. The first two weeks of March 1943 were spent in 'Exercise Spartan', which involved much movement, 342 Bty forming part of a 'flying column' that drove from Yorkshire to seize the bridge at Hungerford, Berkshire, before retiring to a defensive 'box' in Northamptonshire. On completion of the exercise the regiment moved into Upton Lovell Camp in Wiltshire.

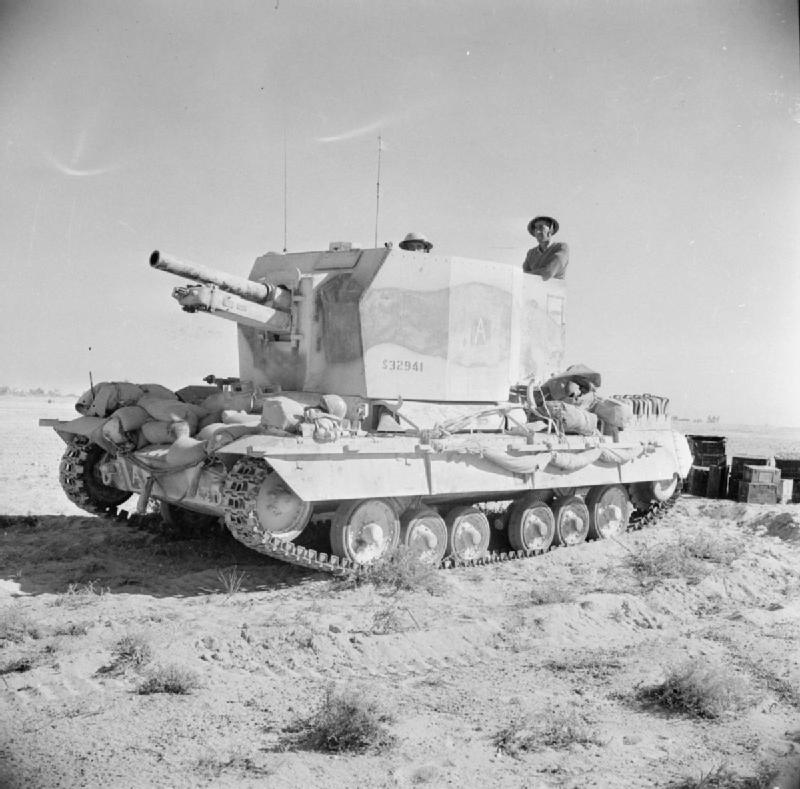
A Bishop SP gun in North Africa.

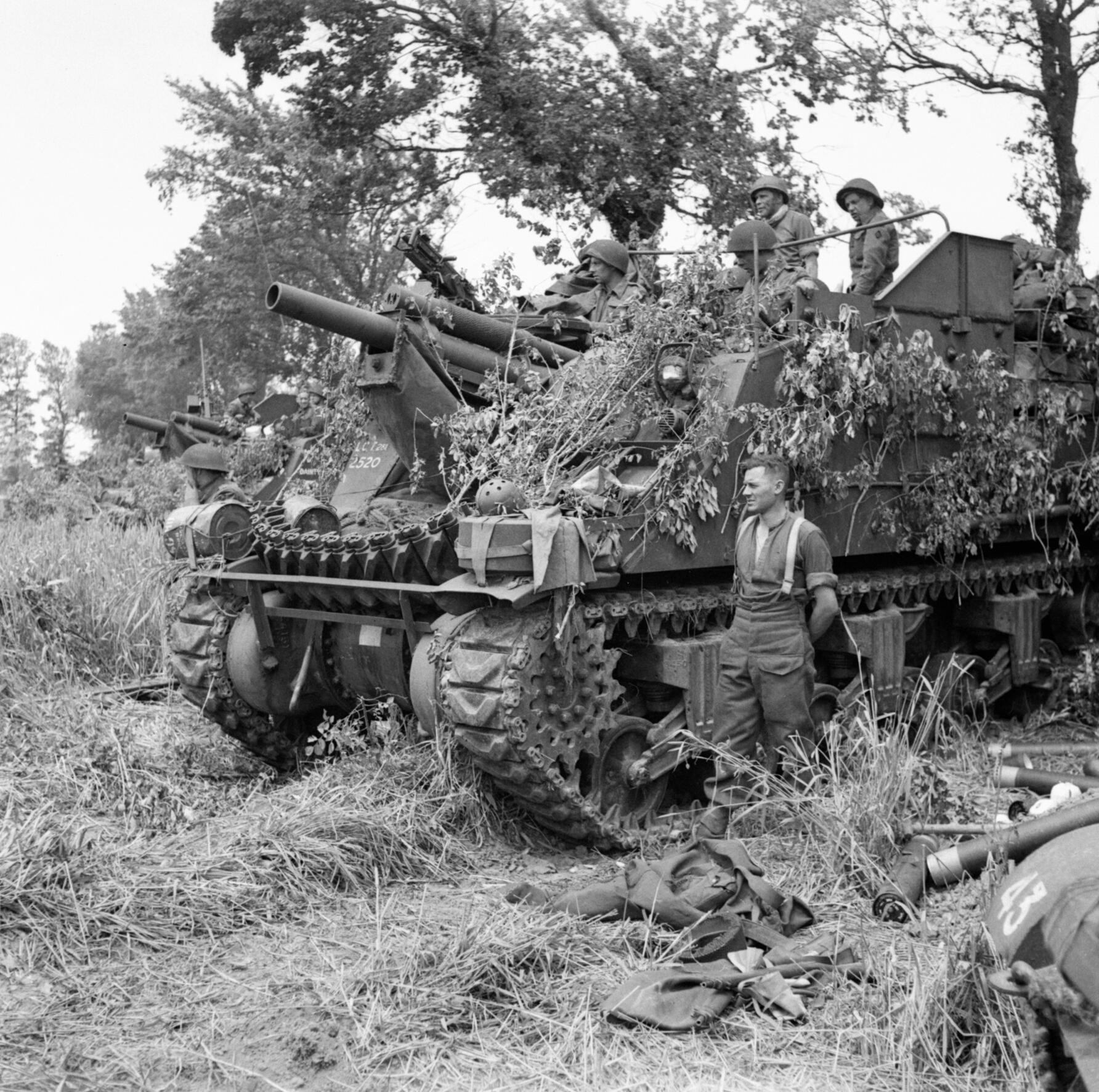
A Priest SP gun during training in the UK.

=== Overlord Training ===
Shortly after arriving at Upton Lovell, the regiment was unexpectedly ordered to collect 24 'tanks' from nearby Codford station. These were actually 'Bishops', 25-pdr Mk II guns mounted on a Valentine tank chassis, which had been improvised as self-propelled (SP) guns for the North African campaign. 86th (HY) Field Rgt was one of the first units in the UK to be equipped with SP guns, and had to develop appropriate establishments and gun drills. On 3 May 1943 the regiment left 42nd Armoured Division and when 21st Army Group was formed in July to prepare for the Allied invasion of Normandy (Operation Overlord), it was assigned to I Corps as a SP field artillery regiment.

The regiment carried out field firing with the new equipment on Salisbury Plain, with the OPs mounted in Crusader tanks, which had been added to the regimental establishment. It also began training in amphibious assaults from Landing craft, tanks (LCTs) on the Dorset coast, and pioneered the technique of firing the SP guns from the landing craft during the run-in to the beach. In August and September the regiment replaced the improvised Bishops with US-built 105mm Priest SP guns. The first full run-in shoot, with all three batteries firing, was conducted in Kilbride Bay in the Firth of Clyde on 15 October. There was further training in conjunction with 70 Bde of 49th (West Riding) Division on the Suffolk coast in November, before the regiment went into winter quarters in Norwich.

In February 1944 86th (HY) Fd Rgt began re-equipping once more, this time with the Canadian-built Sexton, which mounted the British 25-pdr instead of the US 105mm gun. The Sexton was intended to become the standard SP field gun in British Commonwealth units. The Crusader OP tanks were replaced with Sherman tanks carrying a dummy gun but increased wireless equipment; these were also used as battery and troop command posts (CPs). The regiment assisted 90th (City of London) Fd Rgt of 50th (Northumbrian) Division in converting directly from towed 25-pdrs to Sextons. 50th (N) Division had been brought back with XXX Corpsafter the Sicily Campaign to add battle experience to 21st Army Group, and had been selected as one of the initial assault divisions for Overlord. 86th (HY) Field Rgt was now attached to XXX Corps and moved to Bournemouth to begin training closely with 50th (N) Division and the naval forces. The final combined landing exercise was carried out at Hayling Island on 4 May and the assault force went into its concentration areas: 86th (HY) Fd Rgt to Camp C14, near Romsey.

=== D Day ===
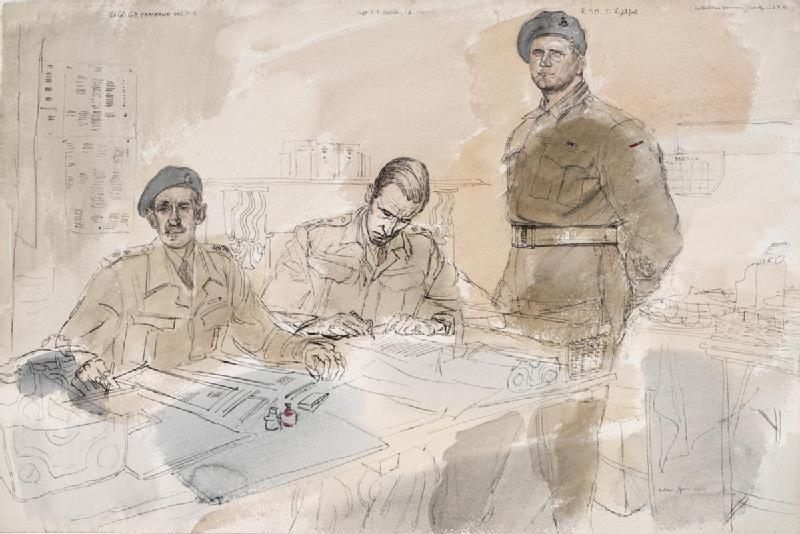
Lt-Col G.D. Fanshawe (CO), Capt R.R. Thornton (adjutant) and Regimental Sergeant-Major T. Lightfoot of 86th (Hertfordshire Yeomanry) Field Rgt, drawn in 1944 by the official war artist Anthony Gross as part of a series on 50th (Northumbrian) Division.

Under the Overlord plan 50th (N) Division landed on Gold Beach with two infantry brigades, 69 and 231, each supported by one SP field regiment (86th (HY) and 90th (CoL) respectively). Within 69 Bde, landing on 'King' Beach, 86th (HY) Fd Rgt's batteries were assigned as follows:

- 341 Bty – 7th Battalion Green Howards
- 342 Bty – 6th Battalion Green Howards
- 462 Bty – 5th Battalion East Yorkshire Regiment

The battery commanders and OPs, with additional OP parties provided by the towed regiments of the divisional artillery, embarked with their respective infantry battalions, while the battery captains and their signallers were on the beach HQ landing craft. The guns, OP tanks and other assault wave vehicles were loaded onto the six LCTs (one per troop) of 24th LCT Flotilla. Each Sexton towed a 'Porpoise', a sledge containing extra fuel and ammunition.

On D-Day (6 June) the regiment began its run-in shoot at H–35 (06.50, 35 minutes before the first troops were to reach the beach at H-Hour). The regiment had 13 separate targets in the bombardment plan, starting with 'Stool', the beach at La Rivière. Fire was continued at a steady rate of four rounds per minutes until H-7, when the guns shifted to 'Cupboard', the heavily defended position round the lighthouse. This continued until H+15 because the infantry landing craft were late. The LCTs then turned away to allow the infantry and engineers to land. 6th Green Howards successfully landed on 'King Green' beach. 5th East Yorkshires had more difficulty on 'King Red', but 462 Bty's OP called down naval gunfire on the enemy gun emplacements along the sea wall. 86th (HY) Field Rgt was due to begin landing at H+90, but A, C and E Trps were able to land 30 minutes early with the follow-up battalion, 7th Green Howards. An infantry–armour 'flying column' left the beach to move inland. As soon as B, D and F Trps had landed at 10.00, and a regimental supply dump had been formed from the Porpoises, A, C and E Trps followed the flying column. By 12.00 the batteries were north of Ver-sur-Mer and 341 Bty was giving fire support as the flying column seized the bridge. 5th East Yorkshires got held up, but the whole regiment brought down fire as 6th Green Howards attacked across their front and secured the villages. By the end of the day 69 Bde was just short of its objective, the main Caen–Bayeux road.

=== Normandy ===
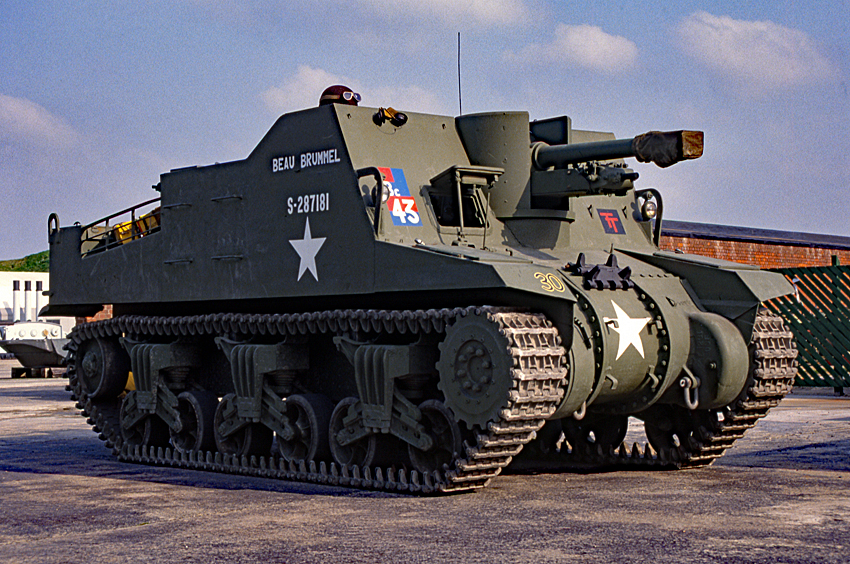
A Sexton SP gun in the markings of 50th (Northumbrian) Division, displayed at the Royal Armouries Museum, Fort Nelson, Hampshire.

7 June was spent in 'mopping up' pockets of German resistance – F Trp acting as infantry helped some tanks to clear a nearby wood – and in pushing forward to the Caen–Bayeux road. For the next two days 8 Armoured Bde attempted to push forward with infantry support from 50th (N) Division and fire support from 86th (HY) and 147th (EY) Fd Rgts, but made little progress. On 10 June 7th Armoured Division took the lead, with 462 Bty supporting 2nd Essex Regiment. That night the Germans counter-attacked with tanks, and the officer commanding (OC), Maj E.G. Scammell and the battery's OPs were involved in the grim night-fighting, bringing down fire support almost on top of themselves to drive the Germans off. E Troop's commander, Capt R.D. Turnbull, rallied some of the infantry and then set off by bicycle through the surrounding enemy to summon reinforcements. Next morning, 341 Bty supported 2nd Gloucestershire Regiment into Tilly-sur-Seulles, but the battalion was driven out: when all the platoon commanders of one company became casualties the battery's Forward Observation Officer (FOO), Lt G.D. Greig, took command of one party and reorganised them into a defensive position. Afterwards the battery commanders and OP parties returned to the regiment's gun lines at Jerusalem Crossroads.

After 7th Armoured Division failed to take Villers-Bocage on 13 June, 50th (N) Division continued its attacks on Tilly-sur-Seulles and the Verrières ridge, where again the OP parties in the front line showed great gallantry. Lieutenant-Col Fanshawe was wounded by mortar fire on 18 June and Maj Morgan Smith took temporary command of 86th (HY) Fd Rgt. Tilly fell on 19 June and the division continued towards Hottot-les-Bagues, but Maj Swann commanding 342 Bty was killed. The attack on Hottot failed, and a lull fell over the divisional front, though 86th (HY) Fd Rgt supported the neighbouring 49th (WR) Division during Operation Epsom (26–27 June). 50th (N) Division made another four-day attack on Hottot with an extensive artillery fireplan, the guns also driving off several counter-attacks. On 11 July 86th (HY) Fd Rgt fired a smokescreen to shield the flank of the attack, but the offensive was still halted short of Hottot. The regiment was taken out of the line on 14 July. The Germans finally evacuated Hottot on the night of 18/19 July after Second Army launched Operation Goodwood south-east of Caen.

By then 86th (HY) Fd Rgt had been switched to support 33 Armoured Bde in XXX Corps' preliminary attacks for 'Goodwood'. A long move on 15 July positioned the regiment south-east of Fontenay-le-Pesnel with 1st Northamptonshire Yeomanry and 144th Regiment Royal Armoured Corps, just 2,500 yards (2,300 m) from the enemy's forward positions. Five hundred rounds of ammunition per gun had been dumped for the regiment to use, and 341 Bty alone fired 1500 in the two-hour barrage starting at 05.30 on 16 July, and nearly 3400 in the day, brought down by five OPs out with the attacking brigades. The attack was, however, a failure, and had to be renewed on 17 July, after the gun positions had suffered a bombing raid and two hours of enemy harassing fire (HF) during the night. On 20 July (D + 44) 86th (HY) Fd Rgt was relieved from all front line commitments and moved to a rest and maintenance area.

The regiment returned to 50th (N) Division on 28 July, and on 30 July began firing from near Caumont in support of a fresh offensive (Operation Bluecoat), switching to supporting 43rd (Wessex) Division's attack on Cahagnes later in the day. 43rd (Wessex) made steady progress and 86th (HY) Fd Rgt moved up behind. At 15.00 on 3 August 341 Bty at Jurques came under high explosive (HE) fire, suffering some casualties and damage. B Troop's commander, Capt S.D. Perry, spotted that the fire was coming from a Tiger tank on the crest in front, so taking over a Sexton whose commander had been wounded, he engaged the tank with HE and armour-piercing (AP) shell, scoring three hits and driving it off, damaged. 462 Battery also engaged another Tiger. At the end of the day 341 Bty was allowed to retire to a less exposed position. During the night 86th (HY) Fd Rgt fired a complicated HF plan on likely enemy withdrawal routes using Air burst, ground burst and smoke ammunition. From 4 August the regiment supported the tanks of 13th/18th Hussars with 43rd (W) Division as they attacked towards the dominating heights of Mont Pinçon. Late on 6 August the Hussars managed to get their two leading Troops onto the hilltop, accompanied by the OP Sherman of 86th (HY) Fd Rgt's D Trp to call down fire support; the infantry then arrived to consolidate the position overnight. The British commanders were delighted by the success. By 8 August almost the whole regiment was positioned on the upper slopes of the hill.

50th (N) Division then resumed the lead on 9 August, with 86th (HY) Fd Rgt and 13th/18th Hussars attached; the OPs advanced with the Hussars through Le Plessis-Grimoult and Saint-Pierre-la-Vieille, followed by a two-day battle for Point 229. 86th (HY) Field Rgt did little firing, but suffered a few casualties from counter-battery (CB) fire. On 13 August the regiment switched back to 43rd (W) Division to force a river crossing at Condé-sur-Noireau; 4000 rounds of smoke shell were dumped in preparation but were not required when the attack went in on the morning of 16 August. 86th (HY) Field Rgt was then placed under the command of 11th Armoured Division, which was given the task of pursuing the enemy as they fled to escape the Falaise pocket. The guns did little firing because of the speed of the German retreat.

=== Antwerp ===
11th Armoured Division was then rested while 43rd (W) Division forced a crossing of the Seine at Vernon; 86th (HY) Fd Rgt was quartered at Aube-sur-Risle and L'Aigle. On 28 August the 90 miles (140 km) drive to Vernon began, and early on 29 August some of 86th (HY) Fd Rgt's OPs were already across the new bridge. 11th Armoured Division then began a 200 miles (320 km) dash to seize Antwerp, with its open left flank guarded by the divisional reconnaissance regiment, 15th/19th Hussars, supported by the Sextons of 86th (HY) Fd Rgt. On the evening of 31 August the regiment drove through Amiens and came into action only 1,000 yards (910 m) behind the division's leading tanks. The advance continued across northern France as German resistance began to harden, particularly approaching Lille on 3 September. Here a tank or anti-tank gun firing from a flank destroyed a number of the regiment's 3-ton lorries carrying fuel and ammunition and killed Maj Corke, OC 341 Bty. Ahead of this ambush, Sergeant Couzins of B Trp was ordered to take his Sexton forward and establish an outpost on the outskirts of Avelin; turning a corner he saw a battery of six Germans guns in action in a shallow valley less than 2,000 yards (1,800 m) away. Couzins immediately opened fire over open sights, destroying the nearest gun with his third round and dispersing the other gunners, who surrendered to the advancing column. Another pocket of resistance in the chateau was firing on RHQ, so Sgt Burgess of D Trp took his Sexton across open ground under 'a hail of fire' to within 100 yards (91 m) of the chateau, where he fired several rounds through the windows. Four German officers and 90 infantrymen came out and surrendered, and Burgess's gun detachment dismounted and 'mopped up' the surrounding area. Beyond Avelin some German tanks attempted another ambush, so 342 Bty deployed from the line of march and laid a smokescreen. 86th (HY) Field Rgt's guns followed 23rd Hussars through Tournai at about 15.00 and were across the main Brussels–Antwerp road by nightfall. Next day (4 September) the regiment with 15th/19th Hussars covered the crossing of the Scheldt at Dendermonde and then protected the division's flank as its leading elements entered the Port of Antwerp before nightfall.

XXX Corps continued its advance east of Brussels, and on 7 September 11 Armoured Division was ordered to move 30 miles (48 km) to reinforce Guards Armoured Division in the bridgehead it had seized over the Albert Canal. This left 86th (HY) Fd Rgt and the 'White Army' of the Belgian Resistance to defend the whole of Antwerp until 51st (Highland) Division could arrive. The guns remained in position in the southern outskirts, able to cover the whole city area and its approaches. All the other available manpower acting as infantry, the carriers, OP and CP tanks, etc., were to occupy the city, making as much noise and movement as possible. 341 and 462 Batteries guarded the north of the city, including the docks and the Albert Canal, while 342 Bty guarded the Scheldt tunnel west of the city centre. With OPs in tall buildings the regiment fired on the slightest enemy movement in the factory area on the other side of the river, and even used the 75 mm main armament of a CP tank (some of those with dummy guns had apparently been replaced with normal gun tanks). Major R.J. Kiln, OC of 342 Bty, was seriously wounded while working with the White Army to prevent German troops crossing the Albert Canal by an undestroyed bridge at Wijnegem. The leading reconnaissance elements of 51st (H) Division arrived at the end of 8 September, before the Germans realised how small the force in Antwerp really was.

=== Market Garden ===
86th Field Rgt left Antwerp the following day, driving to Kursaal in the XXX Corps bridgehead over the Albert Canal. Initially it formed part of the corps anti-tank screen under 100th Anti-Aircraft Brigade, but the area was quiet. On 15 September it moved to a gun area immediately south of the Meuse-Escaut Canal, with OPs in the houses of Lommel, ready to take part in the opening barrage for Operation Market Garden. In 'Garden', the ground part of the operation, XXX Corps was to link up river crossings as far as the Nederrijn at Arnhem via a 'carpet' of airborne troops. The 'milk round' bombardment began at 14.00 on 17 September, first with CB fire on enemy gun positions, then a rolling barrage to saturate the defences either side of the main road up which Guards Armoured Division began its advance. That night the gun area came under enemy fire while the Germans counter-attacked around Lommel, and the battery was still under fire the following day. On 19 September Guards Armoured reached the bridge at Grave and 86th (HY) Fd Rgt was called forward to defend the flank of their long line of communications. 341 Battery went to Zon with the 15th/19th Hussars and on arrival helped to disperse an attack by six Panther tanks. On 20 September it claimed two of the six tanks knocked out attacking Zon before a reinforcement wave of the US 101st Airborne Division arrived by parachute and glider. On 21 September 342 Bty moved up to Sint-Oedenrode with 44th Royal Tank Regiment and a squadron of the Royal Dragoons. In the afternoon the town came under shellfire as a German battlegroup counter-attacked the vital bridges at Veghel and the battery was constantly in action over the next 24 hours; only the chance discovery of an abandoned ammunition lorry from Guards Armoured kept it supplied. 462 Battery had remained with 50th (N) Division, waiting to move forward. By 22 September it was at Eindhoven, and was then ordered to drive through Sint-Oedenrode and Grave to go into action near Nijmegen. Shortly after it passed through, the road was cut between Veghel and Uden; 341 Bty was brought up nearer to Veghel and both batteries, together with two batteries of 124th (Northumbrian) Fd Rgt, a medium battery and a heavy anti-aircraft battery, all directed by 342 Bty HQ, took part in the fight to clear the road. Once it was reopened, 341 Bty moved up to join 462, leaving 342 Bty isolated outside Veghel, where it was heavy shelled, losing numerous casualties. 342 Battery later moved into the safety of Veghel and was attached to 90th (CoL) Fd Rgt of 50th (N) Division, taking part in several battles to keep the road open until the fighting died down on 26 September.

=== Geilenkirchen ===
462 and 341 Btys, later joined by 342 Bty, had taken up positions in woods near Groesbeek, supporting the US 82nd Airborne Division to protect Nijmegen against attacks from that direction. One such attack on the night of 30 September/1 October saw one of the regiment's OPs have to evacuate hurriedly to avoid being overrun, but the attackers were driven off by concentrated shellfire. The regiment continued in these positions until 12 October, by which time batteries could be rotated out of the line for rest in Nijmegen. During this period RHQ controlled a number of British artillery units supporting 82nd Airborne. On leaving the line 86th (HY) Fd Rgt was with Guards Armoured Division in a rest area at Grave, then on 5 November it moved up to 11th Armoured Division facing the River Maas near Venray. On 10/11 November the regiment made a long night move to near Sittard to take part in Operation Clipper. Part of this operation was to be carried out by the US 84th Division under XXX Corps. This division had no combat experience, and XXX Corps' commander, Lt-Gen Brian Horrocks, wrote: 'I was determined that they should have every possible assistance, so for tank support I gave them my most experienced armoured regiment, the Sherwood Rangers Yeomanry ... and above all the support of my superb corps artillery'. 86th (HY) Fd Rgt was directly attached to the Sherwood Rangers, with RHQ located alongside 84th Divisional Artillery HQ to coordinate the supporting artillery fire from XXX Corps. Large quantities of ammunition were dumped, the guns were moved into prepared positions near Grothenrath on 16 November and the largescale barrage opened the attack on 18 November. Despite bad weather and mud, and heavy casualties, the first day of the operation was successfully carried out, and Geilenkirchen was captured next day. But the fighting bogged down amongst the defences of the Siegfried Line; 86th (HY) Fd Rgt ran out of smoke ammunition to cover the Sherwood Rangers' tanks and had to borrow more from 43rd (W) Division. Ammunition lorries became bogged down around the gun positions and had to be towed by the OP and CP tanks. The front became static on 23 November and the regiment was pulled out next day.

=== Ardennes ===
86th Field Rgt returned to Guards Armoured Division and assumed a defensive routine with very firing. From 6 to 17 December the regiment was out of the line for maintenance and preparing gun positions for a planned operation to close up to the River Roer. When this operation was cancelled Guards Armoured was ordered on 16 December to begin to move back to Louvain for maintenance and training. However, that day the Germans launched their Ardennes Offensive (the Battle of the Bulge) and next day the division was sent to establish a 'stop line' between Huy and Namur on the River Meuse. While most of 86th (HY) Fd Rgt picked out gun positions round Namur on 22 December, 341 Bty was detached in direct support of the divisional reconnaissance regiment, 2nd Armoured Battalion, Welsh Guards, forward at Jodoigne. 29 Armoured Bde then arrived from 11th Armoured Division to create another stop line from Namur to Dinant; it arrived without artillery, so 342 and 462 Btys were assigned to 23rd Hussars at Givet and 3rd Royal Tank Regiment (3rd RTR) at Dinant respectively. On 25 December 3rd RTR contacted an enemy armoured column and a sharp engagement followed, with 462 Bty helping to stop the German advance. The other two batteries crossed the Meuse, (341 Battery having transferred to 2nd Fife and Forfar Yeomanry (FFY) of 29 Armoured Bde) and deployed on the high ground beyond. On 30 December C Trp of 342 Bty took part in an offensive action, driving 15 miles (24 km) across country in support of 61st Reconnaissance Regiment patrolling towards Bure. On 1 January 1945 6th Airborne Division arrived to take over the sector and next day the regiment moved its guns forward over extraordinarily difficult roads. On 3 January a battle group under 29 Armoured Bde HQ, consisting of 2nd FFY, two parachute battalions and 86th (HY) Fd Rgt, attacked towards Bure and Wavreille. 13th (Lancashire) Parachute Battalion supported by a squadron of 2nd FFY and 342 Bty forced their way into Bure and held the village for two days against fierce counter-attacks (the Battle of Bure); they were withdrawn on the night of 5/6 January, covered by an artillery programme. Wavreille and Chapel Hill were successfully cleared, Chapel Hill then being held by a squadron of 2nd FFY and the OP tank of 86th (HY) Fd Rgt with no infantry support during daylight. The enemy withdrew on 8 January and on 15 January XXX Corps was released from its commitments in the Ardennes. By 18 January 86th (HY) Fd Rgt was in a maintenance and training area near Diest.

=== Reichswald ===
Lieutenant-Col Fanshawe had been promoted to become commander, RA, of 3rd Division on 27 December, and the second-in-command, Maj R.G. Gordon-Finlayson, took temporary command of 86th (HY) Fd Rgt. An unprecedented concentration of artillery was assembled for XXX Corps' next action, Operation Veritable, aiming to clear the Reichswald up to the Rhine. 86th (HY) Fd Rgt was assigned to 15th (Scottish) Division, directly supporting its attached armour, 6 Guards Armoured Bde. (Note: 6 Guards Armoured Brigade operated Churchill tanks, so 86th (HY) Fd Rgt switched to Churchills for its CP and OP tanks.) The regiment's guns and armoured vehicles moved up through Eindhoven and Nijmegen on 1 February and went into camouflaged 'hides' in the Groesbeek Forest; the other vehicles arrived early on 7 February. That afternoon the guns moved out to their platforms, where 4800 rounds per battery had already been dumped. The 'milk round' of CB fire began at 05.00 next morning, then at 09.15 the guns switched to firing a smokescreen to cover the assembly of the assault troops. At 10.00 the rolling barrage began as the attack went in. 86th (HY) Field Rgt ceased fire at 15.00 and moved forwards 3 miles (4.8 km) to fields east of Groesbeek, but any further movement was halted by thick mud and traffic jams. The regiment resumed firing at 18.45 and continued until midnight. Having shortened the range the regiment's 25-pdrs were now able to join the heavy and medium artillery firing on the Materborn feature for the follow-up attack through the Siegfried Line defences by 44 (Lowland) Bde, though the brigade was unaware that this support was available. Next day, Guards Armoured and 43rd (W) Division were to pass through 15th (S) Division and 'flying columns', each with a battery of 86th (HY) Fd Rgt's Sextons attached, were supposed to fan out from the Materborn. However, mud, floods and traffic chaos prevented this from happening until 12 February, when 341 Bty supported 7th Seaforth Highlanders and a squadron of 4th Armoured Bn Coldstream Guards advancing from Cleve towards Calcar. This column immediately ran into opposition at Qualburg, and the battery hurriedly took up a position in the western outskirts of Cleve from where it fired over the housetops at the enemy guns and mortars. Progress was slow over succeeding days, but on 16 February II Canadian Corps began pushing through the low ground between the Cleve–Calcar road and the Rhine. D Troop of 342 Bty found the Canadian Kangaroo armoured personnel carriers actually driving through their gun positions to begin the attack. On 17 February 86th (HY) Fd Rgt moved forward to support next day's attack by 15th (S) Division on Goch. Over the following days the regiment was almost constantly on call as 15th (S) and 53rd (Welsh) divisions leapfrogged forwards short distances towards Weeze.

The Reichswald offensive was renewed on 26 February with Operation Blockbuster. XXX Corps' attack was carried out on 27 February by 3rd Division, with support from 6 Guards Armoured Bde and 86th (HY) Fd Rgt. 2nd Battalion East Yorkshire Regiment seized the vital bridge on the Weeze–Udem road and then held it all night against fierce counter-attacks, with the support of 86th (HY) Fd Rgt and every other gun within range. The regiment was then switched to Guards Armoured Division for an armoured thrust from Goch beginning on 5 March. Guards Armoured fought its way through thick woods towards Bonninghardt against pockets of strong resistance, then into the village itself, and finally on the morning of 7 March reached the rest of the ridge, looking down on the Germans retreating towards the two Rhine bridges at Wesel, 8 miles (13 km) away. On the afternoon of 7 March the division resumed its advance with 2nd Scots Guards supported by 2nd Armoured Welsh Guards accompanied by the OPs of 86th (HY) Fd Rgt, and by nightfall the armour had advanced as far as a stream. After the Sappers had struggled to bridge this the Scots Guards continued their advance on 8 March against stiff opposition. The Coldstream Guards group (1st Bn and 4th Armoured Bn) took over next day with their flank covered by a smokescreen laid by 86th (HY) Fd Rgt. On the morning of 10 March the regiment's OPs observed the two Rhine bridges being blown up as the German bridgehead was eliminated.

=== Germany ===
Having closed up to the Rhine, 21st Army Group now prepared for an assault crossing (Operation Plunder). 86th (HY) Field Rgt came out of action at Bonninghardt on 11 March and on 14 March went back to billets in Nijmegen. A party began dumping ammunition at its assigned positions near the Rhine at Gesthuysen on 19 March and next day the regiment moved up to a concentration area in the Reichswald. On the night of 21/22 March it took a circuitous route without lights through Goch and Weeze to Gesthuysen and was camouflaged in hides before sunrise. For the assault phase, 86th (HY) Fd Rgt was placed under the command of 51st (H) Division, which would cross near Rees using amphibious vehicles. There was no preliminary bombardment: the assault was launched at 21.00 on 23 March, accompanied by every gun in range. During this firing a gun of A Trp suffered an accidental explosion, destroying the gun with its crew. It had been intended to take the regiment's Sextons across on rafts, but the sappers completed a Class 40 bridge (capable of taking tanks) early on 27 March, and the regiment ceased fire at 04.30 and began crossing 'London Bridge' at 06.00 as a complete regiment. It went into action near Millingen while heavy fighting continued round Anholt and Isselburg. Then it joined Guards Armoured Division, which began passing through the bridgehead on 30 March.

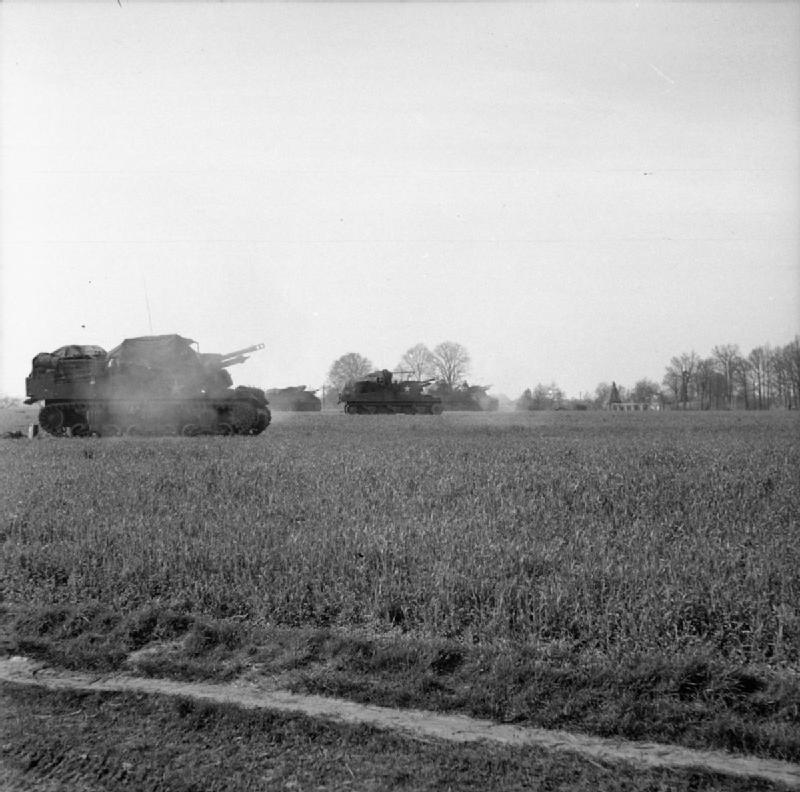
Sextons of 341 Bty supporting Guards Armoured Division from a position near Menslage, 9 April 1945.

86th (HY) Field Rgt was assigned to support 32 Guards Bde, which followed 5 Guards Armoured Bde out of the bridgehead. Late on 1 April 32 Guards Bde pushed its Welsh/Scots Guards group, accompanied by 341 Bty, through to try to capture Oldenzaal before dark. The column drove through Enschede (where they were greeted enthusiastically by the Dutch population) but were stopped by anti-tank guns on the airfield. 341 Battery prepared a fireplan for an attack on the airfield at first light next morning, but the Germans had abandoned their anti-tank guns and disappeared. The brigade then moved on through Oldenzaal to Nordhorn, where the battery went into action while the sappers bridged the canal. The bridge was ready at 23.00 and two squadrons of Welsh Guards drove out with Scots Guards infantry riding on the tanks and accompanied by the 86th's OP tanks in an attempt to cover 20 miles (32 km) to seize the bridge over the Dortmund–Ems Canal at Lingen. A second bridge in Nordhorn collapsed behind the group, so the guns were stuck in the town until it could be repaired, but the tanks drove on through the night without lights and through heavy rain, sweeping retreating parties of Germans off the road. However, when the column reached Lingen the bridge was blown up before it could be taken. While 3rd Division was brought up to make a set-piece assault at Lingen, the Guards found another intact bridge 3 miles (4.8 km) north and the Coldstream Guards group rushed it under cover of a regimental concentration by 86th (HY) Fd Rgt, fired without preliminary ranging. On 4–5 April the regiment supported both divisions as they cleared Lingen and the area between the canal and the River Ems. On 6 April the Scots/Welsh group with 341 Bty attempted to break out of the Lingen bridgehead on the Bremen road, but only got 3 miles (4.8 km) before running into rearguards. The anti-tank guns were suppressed by 341 Bty's fire brought down by the OPs and Air OPs overhead, allowing the tanks and infantry to deploy and destroy them. The column spent the night just short of Nordholten. Next morning the two Guards groups drove on to Lengerich, where they ran into another rearguard. 341 Battery deployed just beyond Nordholten and brought down fire, including red smoke marker shells for a rocket attack by Typhoon aircraft. On 8 April the Coldstream group pushed on to Berge, then on 9 April the Scots/Welsh group led towards Menslage, hindered by broken bridges that had to be repaired and rearguards that each had to be turned out by combined tank–infantry–artillery operations. After Menslage had been captured the infantry of the Coldstream group forced a crossing of the River Hase on 11 April, accompanied by 86th (HY) Fd Rgt's OP on foot.

On 12–13 April German resistance lessened as they pulled their forces back for the defence of Bremen. XXX Corps also regrouped: Guards Armoured Division and 86th (HY) Fd Rgt were rested, then on 18 April the regiment made a long move to join 51st (H) Division as it prepared to capture Delmenhorst. The regiment's OPs joined 13th/18th Hussars and 2nd Derbyshire Yeomanry, which were operating on the division's flanks and meeting patchy opposition. The regiment fired small fireplans to help clear the villages. A preliminary attack by 152 Bde on the night of 18/19 April captured the village of Adelheide and the nearby airfield and bridges, and when the attack on Delmenhorst went in on 20 April the town fell without a shot being fired, including 86th (HY)'s regimental fireplan. On 23 April the regiment came under 3rd Division, working under their former CO, Brig Fanshawe, as CRA. The guns took up positions in woods and gardens round Erichshof, about 5 miles (8.0 km) from Bremen, from which they participated in a huge 'softening up' bombardment, beginning on 23 April and continuing throughout the following day. On 25 April 3rd Division secured all its objectives in the city. From 27 April the regiment followed 51st (H) Division down the River Weser, coming into action at the Bremen–Hamburg autobahn, at Bremervörde, and against occasional targets as the division advanced through crumbling resistance to Bremerhaven and Cuxhaven. Hostilities ended on 5 May after the German surrender at Lüneburg Heath.

After VE Day 86th (HY) Fd Rgt rejoined Guards Armoured Division in disarming German troops at Cuxhaven and then moved to Verden, where it was billeted in surrounding villages. In July all the men of the older age and service groups were transferred to 147th (Essex Yeomanry) Fd Rgt for occupation duties and 86th (HY) Fd Rgt received a large draft of men intended for service in the Far East. However, the Surrender of Japan in August ended these plans and the regiment remained in British Army of the Rhine (BAOR). Demobilisation began in the autumn, and the regiment was placed in suspended animation at Verden Barracks in BAOR on 10 April 1946.

== Postwar ==
=== 286 (Hertfordshire Yeomanry) Field Regiment ===
When the TA was reconstituted in 1947, 86th (HY) Fd Rgt was reformed as 286 (Hertfordshire Yeomanry) Field Rgt, as a towed 25-pounder unit forming part of 89th (Field) Army Group Royal Artillery (AGRA) in Eastern Command. The regiment began recruiting on 14 June with the following organisation:

- RHQ at St Albans
- P Battery at Harpenden Road and Abbey Camp, St Albans
- Q Battery at St Andrew House, Hertford (D Trp at Harpenden Road, St Albans, from 1953)
- R Battery and LAD, Royal Electrical and Mechanical Engineers (REME), at Bearton Camp, Hitchin

The CO was Lt-Col R.D. Cribb (first commissioned in the 86th Fd Bde in 1928, who had served with other units during World War II) with Maj J.B. Morgan Smith (first commissioned in 86th Fd Bde in 1927, who had won a DSO with the regiment on D Day) as adjutant and the wartime Regimental Sergeant Major, T. Lightfoot, as one of the Permanent Staff Instructors. Several of the other officers and NCOs had wartime experience with 86th (HY) or 191st (H&EY) Fd Rgts. Most of the personnel in the 1950s were National Servicemen fulfilling their reserve commitment, some of whom volunteered to remain in the TA afterwards.

On 1 October 1954 the regiment was converted to medium artillery without changing its number or subtitle. It was now equipped with 5.5-inch guns. and AEC Matador gun tractors. 286 Medium Rgt Trp, Royal Signals, joined from 61 HQ Signal Regiment at Bedford, on 1 November 1954. When Anti-Aircraft Command was abolished on 10 March 1955, the regiment absorbed 479th (Hertfordshire Yeomanry) HAA Rgt, descended from 343 (Watford) Bty (see above). As a result, the batteries at Hitchin and Hertford merged at Welwyn Garden City with the LAD, and the former 479 HAA Rgt drill hall at Croxley Green housed the new third battery. 54th (East Anglian) Division was reformed in 1956 and on 15 June the regiment was converted back to divisional field artillery; 89 (Fd) AGRA became 54th (EA) Divisional Artillery once more. RA units became responsible for all internal signals and the signal troop was abolished.

=== 286 (Hertfordshire & Bedfordshire Yeomanry) Field Regiment ===
On 1 April 1961 the regiment was amalgamated with 305 (Bedfordshire Yeomanry) Light Rgt to form 286 (Hertfordshire & Bedfordshire Yeomanry) Field Rgt with the following organisation:

- RHQ and HQ Bty at Bedford
- P Bty:
  - BHQ and one section at Biggleswade
  - One section at Welwyn Garden City
- Q Bty:
  - BHQ and one section at Luton
  - Once section at Dunstable
- R (South Hertfordshire) Bty:
  - BHQ and one section at Sty Albans
  - One section at Croxley Green
- LAD, REME, at Welwyn Garden City

When the TA was reduced into the Territorial and Army Volunteer Reserve (TAVR) on 1 April 1967, the regiment became 201 (Hertfordshire & Bedfordshire Yeomanry) Medium Bty, based at Marsh Road, Luton, in 100 (Eastern) Medium Rgt (Volunteers), in TAVR II. 286 (H&BY) Field Rgt also provided personnel to No 2 (Hertfordshire) and No 3 (Bedfordshire) Companies of the Bedfordshire and Hertfordshire Regiment (Territorials) in TAVR III. 100 (Eastern) Medium Rgt was redesignated 100 (Yeomanry) Rgt in 1976. Under the Army 2020 plan, this unit was placed in suspended animation in 2014.

== Commanders ==
=== Commanding officers ===
The following served as CO of the unit:

86th (East Anglian) (Hertfordshire Yeomanry) Field Brigade/Regiment

- Lt-Col the Hon Geoffrey Lawrence, DSO, TD, appointed 16 February 1920
- Lt-Col Barré A.H. Goldie, 1 April 1926
- Lt-Col Sir Geoffrey Church, 2nd Baronet, MC, 1 April 1929
- Lt-Col W.R.D. Robertson, OBE, MC, TD, 1 April 1936
- Lt-Col Sir Patrick Coghill, 6th Baronet, TD, 17 January 1939
- Lt-Col R.S. Wade, 28 May 1941
- Lt-Col G.D. Fanshawe, OBE, January 1942
- Maj R.G. Gordon-Finlayson, 27 December 1944
- Lt-Col R.C. Symonds, 2 April 1945

286th (Hertfordshire Yeomanry) Field Regiment

- Lt-Col R.D. Cribb, TD, 30 April 1947
- Lt-Col D.E. Newton, TD, 1 May 1951
- Lt-Col G.A. Loveday, 1 May 1954
- Lt-Col A.H. Watts, TD, 1 May 1957
- Lt-Col K. Lomas, 1 May 1960

286th (Hertfordshire & Bedfordshire Yeomanry) Field Regiment

- Lt-Col K. Lomas, TD, 1 April 1961
- Lt-Col J.D. Bolton, TD, 1 January 1963
- Acting Lt-Col C.W.S. Runham, TD, 1 August 1966

=== Honorary Colonels ===
Joint Honorary Colonels were appointed when the unit was established in 1920:

- Maj-Gen the Marquess of Salisbury, KG, KCVO, CB, TD, Hon Col of 4th East Anglian Bde from 1909
- Col Abel Henry Smith, former CO of the Hertfordshire Yeomanry and Hon Col from 1916 (died 1930)

Thereafter the following served in the office:

- Col Barré A.H. Goldie, CBE, TD, former CO of 86th Field Bde, appointed 21 February 1931
- Brig Sir Geoffrey Church, former CO of 86th Field Bde, appointed to 86th (EA) (HY) Field Rgt and reappointed to 286th (HY) Field Rgt; retired January 1952
- Maj-Gen G.D. Fanshawe, DSO, OBE, former CO, appointed January 1952
- Brig R.N. Hanbury, CBE, TD, former Hon Col of 479 (H) HAA Rgt, appointed 1957
- Gen Sir Evelyn Barker, former Hon Col of 305 (BY) Lt Rgt, appointed to 286 (H&BY) Fd Rgt 1 April 1961 until 31 December 1962
- Brig R.N. Hanbury, reappointed to 286 (H&BY) Fd Rgt 1 January 1963
- Maj Simon Whitbread, appointed to 286th (H&BY) Fd Rgt 26 December 1964

== Heritage and ceremonial ==
=== Uniforms and insignia ===
Upon conversion from yeomanry to artillery, the regiment had to adopt the Royal Artillery's 'gun' cap badge. However, from its formation all four batteries of the regiment also wore the Hertfordshire Yeomanry's Hart badge, on the shoulder strap for officers, on the upper arm for other ranks (ORs), later as collar badges and on the field service cap worn in walking-out dress in place of the RA's 'flaming bomb' badge. The officers' blue patrol jacket had cavalry-style shoulder chains. On 4 April 1943, as a unit of armoured artillery, the regiment unofficially adopted the black beret of the Royal Armoured Corps and wore the silver Hart badge on it. They were forced to give these up in late 1945.

When the regiment was reformed in 1947 the Hart badge was worn on the blue RA beret, except for National Service reservists who wore the RA gun badge. The blue patrol jackets carried shoulder-chains for all ranks, and the pre-1900 'Harts (sic`) Yeomanry Cavalry' button. All ranks wore the 89 AGRA formation badge on battledress: this consisted of a yellow 'bomb' inside a white horseshoe (reflecting the predominantly yeomanry regiments in the group) on a dark green square. When 89 AGRA became 54th (EA) Divisional Artillery, the personnel adopted the division's new arm badge of two arrows crossed through a Coronet of fleurs-de-lis in yellow on a royal blue background.

286 (Hertfordshire & Bedfordshire Yeomanry) Fd Rgt wore the Hart as a cap badge, with the Bedfordshire Yeomanry 'Eagle and Castle' badge on the collar, and RA buttons. 305 (Bedfordshire Yeomanry) Lt Rgt had worn the airborne forces 'Pegasus' badge as an honorary distinction granted to 419 Heavy Bty of 52nd (BY) Heavy Rgt during the Battle of Arnhem; since 419 Bty had been based in Dunstable this badge was continued by Q (Luton & Dunstable) Bty on the lower arm. 201 (H&BY) Bty adopted a collar badge incorporating the 'Eagle and Castle' in an oval wreath alongside the Hart in an oval strap, with a crown above and the Herts Yeomanry's 'South Africa 1900–01' Battle honour on a scroll beneath; this badge was also applied to guns and vehicles. From 1968 the battery was authorised to continue the 'Pegasus' arm badge.

=== Freedoms ===
286 (Hertfordshire & Bedfordshire Yeomanry) Fd Rgt was granted the Freedom of the City of St Albans in 1962 and the Freedom of the Borough of Bedford in 1963. 201 (Hertfordshire & Bedfordshire Yeomanry) Medium Bty was granted the Freedom of the Municipal Borough of Dunstable.

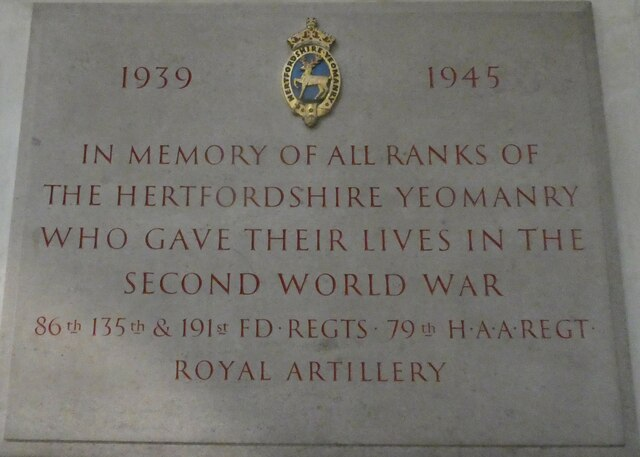
Herts Yeomanry 1939–1945 memorial.

=== Memorial ===
The Commonwealth War Graves Commission (CWGC) lists 50 members of the regiment who died on service during World War II; there may be others who were simply listed as RA. A stone tablet commemorating the men of all four Hertfordshire Yeomanry artillery regiments who died during World War II was unveiled on 19 September 1954 in the War Memorial Chapel of St Albans Cathedral.
