= Northamptonshire Volunteers =

From the creation of the British Regular Army in 1660, it has been supplemented by part-time volunteer units raised on a local basis. Northamptonshire has often been in the forefront of raising these units, both of horse and foot, whenever circumstances required.

The principal reserve force for the army was the Militia composed of part-time soldiers who could be embodied for full-time national defence in time of war, sometimes augmented by full-time Fencible regiments. The Northampton Militia, later Northampton and Rutland Militia, dated from 1763, and a regiment of Northampton Fencibles was raised in 1794. The Volunteers remained part-time soldiers who might be called out for local defence in time of invasion or crisis. From 1859 they became a permanent part of the army's auxiliary forces, and after integration into the Territorial Force the county's volunteers served in both world wars of the 20th century.

== Restoration 1660 ==
There are records of volunteers being raised in Northamptonshire in 1660 during the crisis that led to the Restoration of Charles II. Mildmay Fane, 2nd Earl of Westmorland, raised a company of two troops, commanded by Charles, Lord Spencer, and Sir Roger Norwich, 2nd Baronet.

== Northampton Volunteer Association 1744 ==
The first time volunteers were organised on a national basis was in 1744 in response to a French invasion threat. Lords-lieutenant of counties and mayors of towns were given authority to form volunteer associations, and Northamptonshire formed the first of these, on 4 April 1744. The proposal was signed by 530 'substantial freeholders, yeomen and yeomen's sons', and unlike most such associations they were willing to serve in any part of the realm, and not only in their own area. During the Jacobite invasion of 1745, the Lord Lieutenant of Northamptonshire, John Montagu, 2nd Duke of Montagu, raised a county regiment, probably from the nucleus of the association. The volunteer associations lapsed on the peace of 1748, but new volunteer units were raised in 1779 when Britain was again threatened by French invasion during the American Revolutionary War.

== Yeomanry 1794 ==
The French Revolutionary Wars saw the creation of Yeomanry regiments in many English counties in 1794. Officered by the aristocracy and gentry, and mainly recruited from their tenants, these cavalry units were as much for internal security against revolutionary elements as for defence against invasion. Several of these units went on to have a long history as part of the auxiliary forces, but the first Northamptonshire Yeomanry were disbanded as a regiment in 1828, leaving some independent troops that survived until the last were disbanded 1873.

== Volunteer Corps 1797 ==
See British Volunteer Corps

In addition to the Yeomanry, many small volunteer units of horse and foot were raised in towns and villages during the Revolutionary War. Daventry appears to have been the first in Northamptonshire, the formation of the Daventry Volunteers being approved on 15 June 1797. Soon afterwards Northampton raised a troop of light horse and a company of infantry and was followed by other towns, the Kettering Volunteers parading in full uniform for the first time on 27 August 1797. The volunteers were disbanded at the Peace of Amiens in 1802.

== Volunteer Corps 1804 ==
When the war against France resumed, the Levy en Masse Act 1803 was passed to force every able-bodied man to be drilled unless sufficient volunteers were raised. This prompted volunteers to come forwards in vast numbers. Within a year some 40 companies of infantry and 16 troops of cavalry had been raised in Northamptonshire:

- Northampton, 1 Troop, commanded by Dr William Kerr.
- Wellingborough, 1 Troop, commanded by J. Newton Goodhall.
- Northamptonshire, 11 Troops, commanded by George Spencer, 2nd Earl Spencer.
- Peterborough, 3 Troops, commanded by William Fitzwilliam, 4th Earl Fitzwilliam.
- Oundle and Cliffe, 7 Companies commanded by John Fane, 10th Earl of Westmorland.
- Spratton, 1 Company, commanded by Rev R. Crowther.
- Northampton, 3 Companies commanded by Henry Locock.
- Castle Ashby, 1 Company commanded by Thomas Scriven.
- Northampton, 3 Companies commanded by Earl Spencer.
- Finedon, 1 Company commanded by Sir William Dolben, 3rd Baronet.
- Cottesbrooke, 1 Company commanded by Sir William Langham, 8th Baronet.
- Kettering, 3 Companies commanded by George Robinson.
- Towcester, 2 Companies, commanded by William Grant.
- Daventry, commanded by John Clarke.
- Brackley, 6 Companies, commanded by R.W. Cartwright.
- The Soke and City of Peterborough, or Prince of Wales's Volunteers, commanded by Henry Cecil, 1st Marquess of Exeter.
- Boughton, 4 Companies, commanded by Lord Stopford.

At first the service of these Volunteers was restricted to their own county, later it was extended to a district. The Northamptonshire Volunteers were initially assigned to a district of Midland counties, later changed to a district of East Anglian counties. In 1804 the Volunteers were consolidated into larger regiments. There were two in Northamptonshire:

- 1st (East) Northamptonshire Regiment, under Lt-Col The Earl of Westmorland.
- 2nd (West) Northamptonshire, under Lt-Col John Clarke.

== Local Militia 1809 ==
Early in 1809 the Volunteers were asked to commute their service into a new Local Militia. The two Northamptonshire volunteer regiments became the East and West Regiments, with a new Central Regiment formed under the command of Lt-Col Thomas Samwell. The Castle Ashby and Northampton Volunteer Infantry refused to transfer and resigned; the Kettering Volunteer Infantry continued to serve as volunteers under the old regulations. The remainder of the Northamptonshire units appear to have transferred to the Local Militia. The Local Militia was disbanded throughout the country at the end of the war in 1814.

== Volunteer Movement 1859 ==
See main article 1st Northamptonshire Rifle Volunteer Corps

An invasion scare in 1859 led to the creation of the Volunteer Force and huge enthusiasm throughout Great Britain for joining local Rifle Volunteer Corps (RVCs). The 1st Northamptonshire Rifle Volunteer Corps were raised from 1859 onwards as a group of originally separate RVCs. They later became the Volunteer Battalion of the Northamptonshire Regiment and as part of the Territorial Force saw action in the Gallipoli and Palestine campaigns during World War I. Converted to a searchlight regiment between the wars, they served in the defence of the UK and as an infantry regiment in liberated Norway during World War II. Postwar they continued as an air defence unit until 1961 when they reverted to infantry as part of the Royal Anglian Regiment.

== Engineer Volunteers 1867 ==
The 1st Northamptonshire Engineer Volunteer Corps was raised at Peterborough in 1867. Initially it was attached to the 1st Administrative Battalion of Northamptonshire RVCs, but in 1872 transferred to the 2nd Tower Hamlets Engineer Volunteer Corps. It moved its attachment again in 1901, joining the 1st Bedfordshire Engineer Volunteer Corps. The unit sent a detachment of volunteers to assist the regular Royal Engineers during the Second Boer War in 1901.

The 1st Northampton EVC did not transfer to the Territorial Force and disbanded in 1908. However, a number of the men transferred to the new Northamptonshire Battery, Royal Field Artillery (see below).

== Imperial Yeomanry 1902 ==
See main article Northamptonshire Yeomanry

A large number of Imperial Yeomanry battalions were raised from volunteers for service in South Africa during the Second Boer War. After the war, a number of these mounted infantry units were reorganised as permanent units of the auxiliary forces, including the Northamptonshire Imperial Yeomanry. When the Imperial Yeomanry became part of the Territorial Force in 1908, the Northamptonshire IY became the Northamptonshire Yeomanry (Dragoons), which saw service in both world wars.

== Territorial Artillery 1908 ==
See main article Northamptonshire Battery, Royal Field Artillery

No Artillery Volunteer Corps was raised in Northamptonshire during the period of the Volunteer Force. However, when the Territorial Force was established in 1908, the Peterborough companies of 1st Volunteer Bn, Northamptonshire Regiment (G and H Companies, formerly the 6th Northamptonshire Rifle Volunteer Corps), were converted to form the Northamptonshire Battery of the Royal Field Artillery and the East Midland Brigade Company of the Army Service Corps. The Northamptonshire Battery served with the 4th East Anglian Brigade, Royal Field Artillery in Palestine and was disbanded in 1919.

== Online sources ==
- Land Forces of Britain, the Empire and Commonwealth (Regiments.org)
- British Army units from 1945 on
