= Northamptonshire Battery, Royal Field Artillery =

1st Northamptonshire Battery, RFA 336th (Northamptonshire) Battery, RA
- Active: 1908–1945
- Disbanded: 1945
- Country: United Kingdom
- Branch: Territorial Force
- Role: Field artillery
- Part of: IV East Anglian Brigade, RFA; 135th (East Anglian) (Hertfordshire Yeomanry) Field Regiment, RA
- Garrison/HQ: Peterborough
- Nickname: The Peterborough Battery
- Engagements: WWI: Western Front; Sinai and Palestine Campaign; WWII: Malayan Campaign; Fall of Singapore

Commanders
- Notable commanders: Hon George Wentworth-FitzWilliam; William Cecil, 5th Marquess of Exeter

The Northamptonshire Battery, Royal Field Artillery was a unit of Britain's Territorial Force from 1908 to 1919. It served in the Sinai and Palestine Campaign during World War I. In World War II the battery fought in the Malayan Campaign and was captured at the Fall of Singapore.

== Early history ==
An invasion scare in 1859 led to the creation of the Volunteer Force and huge enthusiasm throughout Great Britain for joining local Rifle Volunteer Corps (RVCs). The 6th (Peterborough) Northamptonshire RVC was one such unit, raised at Peterborough in Northamptonshire on 3 March 1860. The first commanding officer was the Hon George Wentworth-FitzWilliam, MP for Peterborough 1841–59. All the county's volunteer units were included in the 1st Administrative Battalion, Northamptonshire RVCs, in 1860.

The following officers commanded the 6th Northamptonshire RVC during its independent existence:

- Hon G. Wentworth-Fitzwilliam, appointed 3 March 1860
- John N. Fazakerley, appointed 14 March 1862
- Thomas J. Walker, 29 July 1865; appointed Captain-Commandant August 1876
- John Beecroft, appointed second Captain 3 June 1872

When the Administrative Battalion was consolidated as the 1st Northamptonshire RVC in 1880, the former 6th at Peterborough formed H and I (later G and H) Companies. Under the Childers Reforms of 1881, the battalion was attached to the Northamptonshire Regiment, and formally changed its title to 1st Volunteer Battalion, Northamptonshire Regiment, in December 1887.

== Territorial Force ==
When the Volunteer Force was subsumed into the new Territorial Force (TF) as part of the Haldane reforms of 1908, the bulk of the 1st Volunteer Bn became the 4th Bn Northamptonshire Regiment, but the two Peterborough companies were converted to form the Northamptonshire Battery of the Royal Field Artillery and the East Midland Brigade Company of the Army Service Corps. Four officers and about 60 other ranks transferred to the new battery and were supplemented by men from the disbanded 1st Northamptonshire Engineer Volunteer Corps.

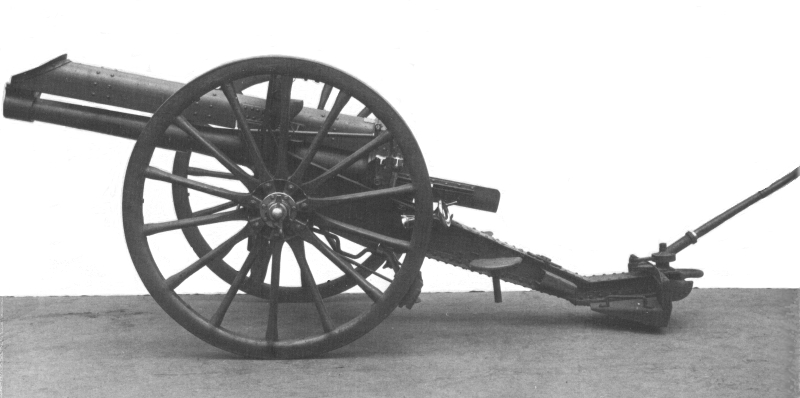
The 15-pounder gun

The Northamptonshire Battery was based at the Drill Hall, Queen's Street, Peterborough, and became popularly known as the Peterborough Battery or Peterborough Artillery. The battery also had an unofficial out-station at Stamford across the county boundary in Lincolnshire. It was included with two Hertfordshire batteries in the IV East Anglian Brigade, RFA, which formed part of the TF's East Anglian Division. (Note: One usually reliable source states that the Northamptonshire Battery formed part of the 3rd (later renumbered 2nd) East Anglian Brigade, but this is contradicted by the Monthly Army List and by the same source a few pages later.) Before World War I broke out, the battery was equipped with four 15-pounder field guns.

William Cecil, 5th Marquess of Exeter, previously a captain in the 3rd Bn Northamptonshire Regiment (the Northampton and Rutland Militia) was appointed commanding officer of the Northamptonshire Battery in the rank of major in 1910. In January 1914 he was promoted to lieutenant-colonel and appointed CO of the whole IV East Anglian Brigade of which his Cecil kinsman, the Marquess of Salisbury, was honorary colonel.

== World War I ==
=== Mobilisation ===
The East Anglian Division had begun its annual training on 27 July 1914 and by 3 August the divisional artillery had concentrated at the Redesdale training area in Northumberland. When the order to mobilise was given on 4 August, the units returned to their headquarters. The division then concentrated around Brentwood, Essex, the 1st Northamptonshire Battery having the furthest to travel arrived on 12 August. On 20 August the division moved to Chelmsford and formed part of the coast defences of the UK until the following May.

Meanwhile, the formation of duplicate or 2nd Line TF units from Home Service men and recruits had been authorised on 1 September, and towards the end of 1914 the 2nd East Anglian Division came into existence at Peterborough. The original (1st Line) Northampton Battery became the 1/1st, and its 2nd Line became the 2/1st Northampton Battery. Later a 3rd Line or Depot unit was formed.

=== 1/1 Northamptonshire Battery ===
The 1st East Anglian Division was employed on coast defence until May 1915, when it was concentrated at St Albans preparatory to going overseas as the 54th (East Anglian) Division. However, when the infantry departed for the Gallipoli Campaign, the divisional artillery was left behind. In August it joined the 2nd Line at Thetford in Norfolk and Brandon, Suffolk, rearmed with modern 18-pounder guns and handed over its obsolete 15-pounders to the 2nd Line batteries. In October 1915, the 1/1st Northamptonshre Battery carried out a march through its recruiting area, visiting Peterborough, Oundle, Kettering, Stamford and Huntingdon. The training march allowed the men to visit their families, and publicised the need for fresh recruits.

==== France and Egypt ====
On 17 November 1915 the 54th Divisional Artillery embarked for France, where it joined 33rd Division, a 'Kitchener's Army' division whose artillery were still under training.

After a month on the Western Front, during which parties of officers and men had been attached for training to other divisions in the Front Line, 54th Divisional Artillery was warned that it was to be transferred to Egypt to rejoin its parent division, which had been withdrawn from Gallipoli. Embarkation began at Marseille on 30 January 1916 and disembarkation was completed at Alexandria by 14 February. The divisional artillery rejoined 54th Division at Mena Camp near Cairo and in April moved into No 1 (Southern) Section of the Suez Canal defences.

On 29 May 1916 the IV East Anglian Brigade was renumbered CCLXXIII (273) Brigade RFA and its batteries became A, B and C. It was renumbered again on 29 December, becoming CCLXX (270), and was reorganised into six-gun batteries. C (1/1st Northamptonshire) Battery was joined by half of B (1/2nd Hertfordshire) Battery and became B Battery.

==== Gaza ====
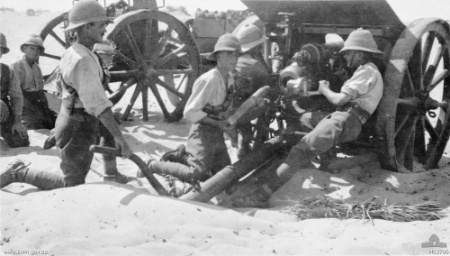
An 18-pounder crew in action in Sinai, 1916.

The infantry battalions of 54th Division were slowly brought back up to strength with drafts from home during 1916, and by mid-January 1917 the whole division had assembled at Moascar in preparation for the British invasion of Sinai. After crossing the Wilderness, the division took part in the First Battle of Gaza (26–7 March), where B/270 Bty found great difficulty crossing the Wadi Guzze, and then breaking up Turkish counter-attacks on the second day. Sergeant Barker won a Distinguished Conduct Medal (DCM) after being wounded but refusing to leave his gun.

During the Second Battle of Gaza (17–19 April) the brigade was not required to fire a shot on the first days. On 19 April it joined in the barrage 10 minutes before H-Hour but the preliminary bombardment had failed to neutralise Turkish artillery and machine guns, and 54th Division's infantry suffered heavy casualties.

On 14/15 and 20/21 July, 270th Bde gave covering fire for major raids on the Turkish lines. A six-day preliminary bombardment for the Third Battle of Gaza began on 27 October, with B/270 Bty attached to 271 (II East Anglian) Bde in No 3 Group supporting 161st (Essex) Brigade. On X-Day (2 November), 161st Bde attacked along the coast behind a creeping barrage laid down by No 3 Group. In preparation for the final capture of Gaza B/270 Bty moved forward after dark on 5 November and spent the following day registering for a new fire programme on 7 November that began two hours before dawn and led to the Turkish evacuation of the town.

On 24 November the Turks counter-attacked the pursuing ANZAC Mounted Division, which was supported by A and C/270 Btys. B/270 Battery was hurried up from the rear to join in, but arrived after the action had ended. The brigade remained in support of the New Zealand Mounted Rifles Brigade, with B/270 Bty dug in under Turkish fire and suffering a steady trickle of casualties until the Surrender of Jerusalem on 9 December.

==== Jaffa and Majdal Yaba ====
During the Battle of Jaffa (21–22 December), B/270 Bty carried out a pre-dawn bombardment of 'Bald Hill' supporting the attack of 2/11th Battalion, the London Regiment, and then followed up 'galloping in best R.H.A. (Royal Horse Artillery) fashion, to be in at the death if necessary'.

During the night of 11/12 March 1918 the 54th Division formed up for an attack on Majdal Yaba. There was no preliminary bombardment: after moving into position, B/270 Bty would fire the first round to warn the rest of the divisional artillery to open fire. However, the battery's intended position was inaccessible, and it had to find an alternative in the dark before Zero Hour. The battery then followed the advance of 162nd (East Midland) Brigade, 'leap-frogging' forward by sections to ensure that some guns were always available. 54th Division then took up defensive positions, which entailed B/270 Bty dragging its guns up a rocky slope to reach its position. Its rock sangars came under regular counter-battery fire and aerial bombing. On 9 April, 270 Bde's guns supported 75th Division's attack on Three Bushes Hill (the Battle of Berukin).

==== Jordan Valley ====
The German spring offensive on the Western Front led to a prolonged lull in operations in Palestine. 54th Division was warned of a move to France that was later cancelled. On 1 August, B/270 Bty was detached to join an ad hoc group from 54th Divisional Artillery sent to relieve the RHA of the Desert Mounted Corps in the British occupation of the Jordan ValleyJordan Valley. After a long and difficult march, the six 18-pounders of B/270 replaced two four-gun batteries of RHA 13-pounders. During this month-long deployment the battery had 36 men evacuated to hospital suffering from Malaria. On return to 54th Division the battery was struck with a fever and had another 58 men in hospital, reducing it to less than half strength when it rejoined 270th Bde on 11 September.

==== Megiddo ====
The Battle of Megiddo opened on 19 September with the Battle of Sharon. B/270 Battery's task was to fire smoke shells for an hour to create a screen in front of 54th Division's assault battalions, and then switch to High Explosive and shrapnel. Once the timed barrage was complete, the battery had to advance in the open under enemy shellfire to a new position from which it was able to shell two tepes holding up the attack. Corporal Runciman, the signaller in the battery commander's observation post, was awarded a DCM for standing up under heavy fire and signalling by flag to the gun positions. Despite the fire, the battery suffered no casualties in this action.

The division was then taken out of the line and concentrated at Haifa, where it was engaged in repairing communications for the rapidly advancing army. It next moved to Beirut, where it was concentrating when the Armistice of Mudros was signed with Turkey and hostilities ended on 31 October.

In late November 1918 the division was ordered to return to Egypt, the artillery proceeding by sea and arriving in mid-December. Demobilisation began in January 1919, and the TF units were slowly reduced to cadres. In March and April, when its guns had been handed in and about one-third of its men had left, 54th Divisional Artillery was converted into an ad hoc cavalry regiment to act as mounted police during disturbances in Cairo, and men of B/270 Bty were scattered over five different posts. Demobilisation recommenced in May and was completed in June.

=== 2/1 Northamptonshire Battery ===
Training for the 2nd Line artillery was hindered by the shortage of equipment, and several months passed before guns, horses and harness were received. Even then, only obsolete French 90 mm guns were available for training. Early in 1915 the 2nd East Anglian Division (which was numbered 69th in August 1915) concentrated round Thetford, where it formed part of First Army in Central Force. The divisional artillery was distributed around Cambridge, Tuddenham and Brandon. In November the divisional artillery took over the 15-pounder guns released by its 1st Line. It continued to use up 15-pounder ammunition for training even after being fully equipped with 18-pounders in January 1916.

In May 1916, the 2/IV East Anglian Brigade was numbered CCCXLVIII Bde RFA, in which 2/1st Northampton became C Battery, and the following month he division was transferred to Northern Command and moved to Harrogate in North Yorkshire. In the summer of 1917 the divisional artillery moved into camp at Welbeck in Nottinghamshire (with practice camps on Salisbury Plain) until winter set in, when they moved into winter quarters around Doncaster and Darlington.

The division's role throughout the war was to train drafts of reinforcements for units serving overseas. By the end of 1917 the 2nd Line infantry battalions had been replaced by training units, and from 1 January 1918 the division lost its 'East Anglian' title. The artillery remained around Darlington (later Middlesbrough) and Doncaster. The brigade was ordered to disband on 1 November 1918, before the Armistice with Germany, and disbandment was completed before the end of January 1919.

=== 3/1 Northamptonshire Battery ===
The 3rd Line Depot brigade (3/IV East Anglian Brigade) was formed at Hertford early in March 1915. At first, training had to be carried out without any guns, harness or horses. In May the unit was affiliated to No 4 TF Artillery School at High Wycombe, and moved there itself at the end of the year. The Artillery School took over training while the 3/IVth became a holding a draft-finding unit. The Third Line East Anglian brigades were merged into the school in August 1916, when it became 4th Reserve Brigade, RFA (TF).

== Interwar ==
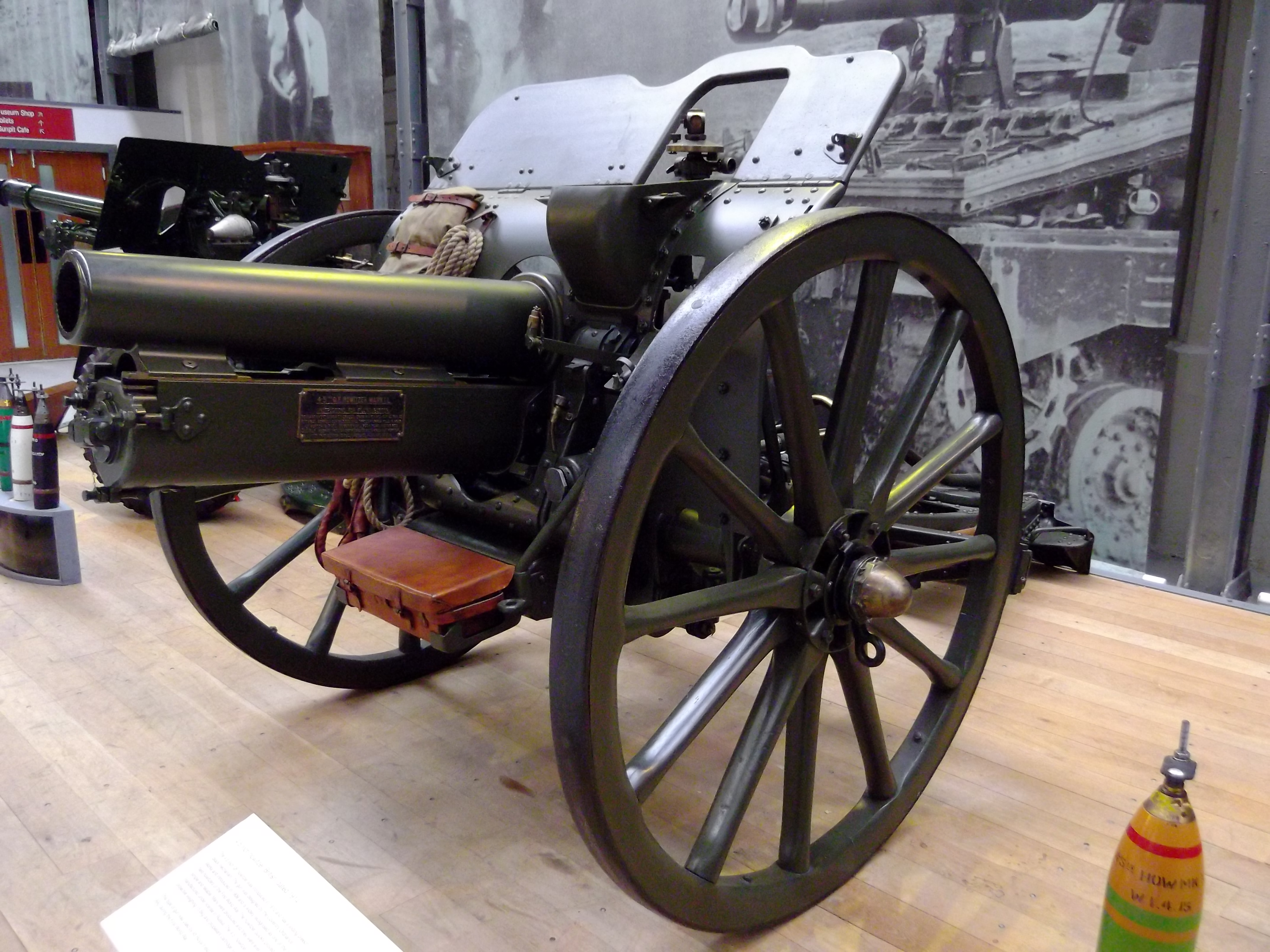
Preserved 4.5-inch howitzer

When the TF was reformed (as the Territorial Army) in 1920, the two Hertfordshire batteries of IV East Anglian Brigade were reformed into 86th (East Anglian) (Hertfordshire Yeomanry) Brigade, without a Northampton component. Instead the Peterborough Bty was reformed as 336th (Northamptonshire) Bty (Howitzer) in 84th (East Anglian) Brigade, Royal Field Artillery, the rest of which comprised Norfolk units. It was equipped with 4.5-inch howitzers. When the RFA merged into the Royal Artillery in 1924, the brigade and battery changed their titles to 'Field Brigade, RA', and 'Field Battery, RA'. The battery's drill hall remained at 36 Queen's Road, later moving to Lincoln Road, Peterborough.

In 1938, the 84th Field Brigade was one of a number of units selected for conversion to the Anti-Aircraft (AA) role. However, 336th (Northamptonshire) Bty was replaced in the Norfolk unit by an existing AA battery from Suffolk. Instead, the Peterborough Battery remained a field artillery unit, joining 86th (East Anglian) (Hertfordshire Yeomanry) Field Regiment on 1 November and forming E and F Troops of 344th Field Battery based in Hitchin.

However, in early 1939 the TA was required to double in size, and existing units formed duplicates. The 86th did this by forming 135th (East Anglian) (Hertfordshire Yeomanry) Field Regiment based on 344th Bty, recreating 336th Bty at Peterborough and 344th at Hitchin. It formed part of 18th Division, the duplicate of 54th (East Anglian) Division.

== World War II ==
=== Phoney war ===
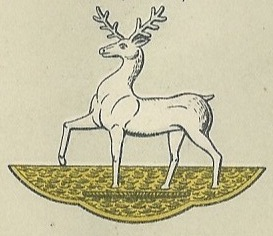
Cap badge of the Hertfordshire Yeomanry

Advance parties of the TA were mobilised on 24 August and general mobilisation was ordered on 1 September, two days before the outbreak of war. 135th Field Regiment assumed full independence from its parent unit on 7 September. In November, 336th Bty concentrated at Kimberley, Norfolk, moving to nearby Hingham Hall when the weather turned bad. During March 1940, parties were temporarily sent to man Lewis guns for AA defence on coastal shipping, and volunteers left to join No. 8 Commando. When the Battle of France began, the battery was sent with its four obsolete 4.5-inch howitzers to guard the coast at Weybourne and at Cley next the Sea, while those not required to man the guns became part of 18th Divisional Artillery Rifle Regiment on anti-paratroop duties. The signallers went to assist the training of 57th (Newfoundland) Heavy Regiment.

In August 1940 the battery exchanged its four 4.5-inch howitzers for eight French 75 mm guns, carried Portee on 30-cwt Fordson trucks, though in September they received some training on 18/25-pounders, and later received 18 Guy Quad-Ant 4 x 4 gun tractors in preparation for the eventual issue of 25-pounder guns, which arrived in January 1941. In November, with winter approaching, the battery moved back into billets at West Runton. On 27 November, C Troop was detached to become E Troop of a new battery (later numbered 499 Bty).

=== Mobile training ===
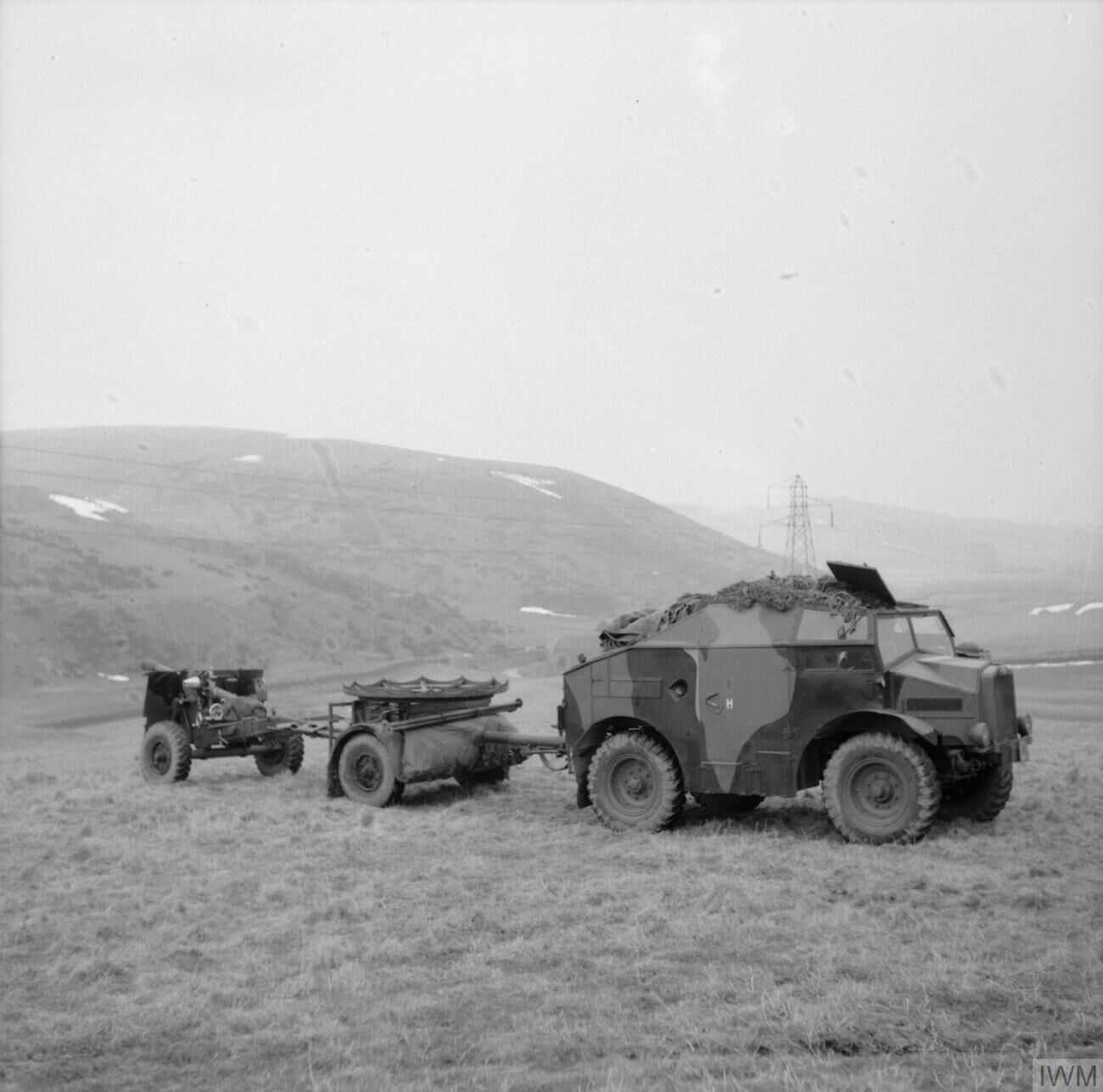
25-pounder gun (probably of 18th Division) on exercise in Scotland, March 1941.

At the beginning of 1941, 18th Division moved from coastal defence duties to join GHQ Reserve and begin mobile training for overseas service. On 1 January, 135th Rgt moved to billets between Lockerbie and Annan in Dumfriesshire, Scotland. After training was completed, the regiment moved to Macclesfield, with 336 Bty later moving to Knowsley Park. It sent a large party on 5 May to Liverpool to assist in air raid duties. That night saw the worst bombing of the Liverpool Blitz and the battery suffered its first casualty of the war. Battle training in North Wales and the Welsh Borders continued during the summer, and the regiment embarked on the SS Sobieski at Gourock on the Firth of Clyde on 31 October.

=== Singapore ===
The Sobieski took the regiment to Halifax, Nova Scotia, where 135th Fd Rgt and 53rd Brigade transshipped to the USS Mount Vernon and CT5 sailed on via Port of Spain to Cape Town. News of the Japanese attacks on Pearl Harbor and Malaya was received, and the convoy's destination was changed from the Middle East to India, and then the Mount Vernon was detached and sent direct to Malaya.

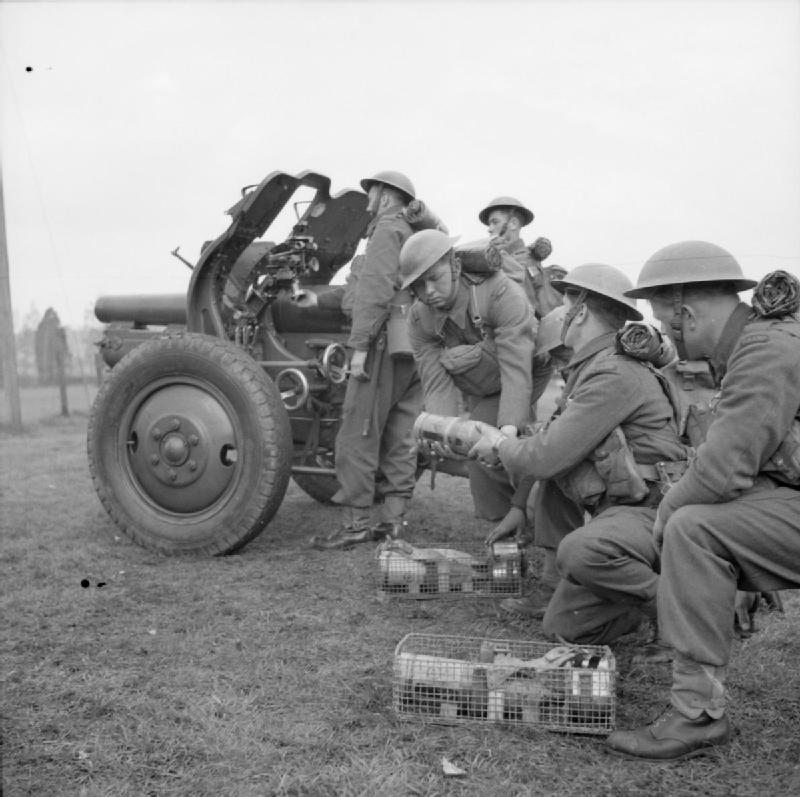
Modernised 4.5-inch howitzer, 1940

135th Field Regiment landed at Singapore on 13 January 1942 during a Japanese air raid. Its guns and equipment were in other ships of CT5, so it had to be re-equipped on arrival, with 336th Bty being issued with eight 4.5-inch howitzers towed by Chevrolet 4 x 4 1 1/2-ton trucks. Together with 53rd Brigade it was attached to 11th Indian Division. On 20 January, 336 Bty moved out to the Mount Austin Estate north of Johor Bahru on the mainland. Then on 24 January it moved up to support 53rd Brigade on the coast road to Senggarang, A Troop with 6th Battalion Norfolk Regiment, moving up from Rengit, the rest of the battery at Brigade HQ at Benut. 6th Norfolks' column was ambushed, one of the 4.5-inch howitzers being lost, though Captain Halford-Thompson got the other into action. A Company of 6th Norfolks with another of A Troop's guns attempted to clear the road, but could only do so temporarily.

11th Indian Division now organised a mixed column under Major Banham of 336 Bty ('Bancol') to open the road from Rengit to Senggarang. The two sections of B Troop were ordered to advance by leap-frog bounds so that they could provide continuous fire support for the scratch force of Norfolks and armoured cars of the Federated Malay States Volunteers. The armoured cars advanced under fire from both sides of the road until a road bock was encountered and the length of the road came under fire, the infantry being cut down, one howitzer lost and the other saved (together with many wounded) by Bombardier Thompson who turned the gun tractor round in the narrow road. Banham in an Indian Carrier did get through to Senggarang, where he reported the road impassable for wheeled vehicles. The commander of 15th Indian Brigade decided to retire to Benut through the mangrove swamps along the shoreline, so A Troop's remaining howitzer was put out of action by dropping the breech-block into the river. Banham, Halford-Thompson and the men of 336th Bty reached Benut late on 27 January. Meanwhile, Rengit was under heavy attack and was overrun during the night of 26/27 January; guns and vehicles were disabled and the survivors made their way to Benut. Lieutenant Lang of 336th Bty took a party to the mouth of the Benut River and helped boatloads of evacuees.

53rd Brigade HQ at Benut was now effectively the front line, defended by 3rd Bn 16th Punjab Regiment and the two remaining howitzers of B Troop of 336th Bty under Captain Neal. The brigade was given permission to withdraw during the night of 27/28 January to Pontian Kechil, which was held by 28th Indian Brigade and 344th Bty. The Benut river bridge and 336th Bty's ammunition dump were blown up and 336th Bty withdrew its two guns. On the night of 30/31 January all the troops in Johor withdrew across the causeway onto Singapore Island, Lt-Col Philip Toosey of 135th Fd Rgt withdrawing his guns by leap-frog bounds to ensure continuous fire support.

At Singapore, 135th Fd Rgt was reunited with its own 25-pounder guns, just arrived with the rest of 18th Division. 336th Battery was the last to refit, due to the casualties it had suffered, and moved into positions near Nee Song on 4 February. Here they were engaged in counter-battery fire missions against Japanese gun positions on the mainland until 9/10 February when the Japanese landed on the western side of the island. 336th Battery was placed in direct support of 28th Indian Brigade, which was ordered to advance into the gap that had appeared between 11th Indian and 8th Australian Divisions. The regiment supported 28th Indian Brigade's attacks with intense fire, followed by harassing fire missions through the night. The following morning the Japanese were within three miles of the regiment's gun positions, so 344th and 499th Btys were withdrawn to join 366th Bty at Nee Soon. On 12 February the regiment was moved again, changing front to go into action at Sembawang airfield, with 336th Bty in a rearguard position covering the Mandai Road. As the defenders were pushed back, 336th Bty withdrew from its rearguard after dark to the Singapore City perimeter defences. One of its Quad gun tractors broke down, so it was overturned into a monsoon drain and the battery's Bedford 15 cwt wireless truck successfully towed out two limbers and a 25-pounder.

The following morning 336th Bty was established on the Balestier road, with A Troop in the open on the polo ground, two of B Troop's guns camouflaged in front gardens and two in garages. With signal cable becoming scarce, 336th's telephone exchange was responsible for the whole regiment. On 14 February the battery was warned of Japanese tanks attacking, and Sergeant Hughes's gun of B Troop was detached and placed in an anti-tank role facing north on Balstier Road. However, the attack did not materialise. The following day a ceasefire was arranged; initially the British were to hand over all their guns, but orders arrived from ABDA that they were to be destroyed. 336th Battery did this by putting a shell in the breech, another in the barrel, and then pulling the firing lever from a safe distance using Trolleybus wire. They later assured their captors that the damage was due to Japanese shelling.

== Burma Railway and disbandment ==
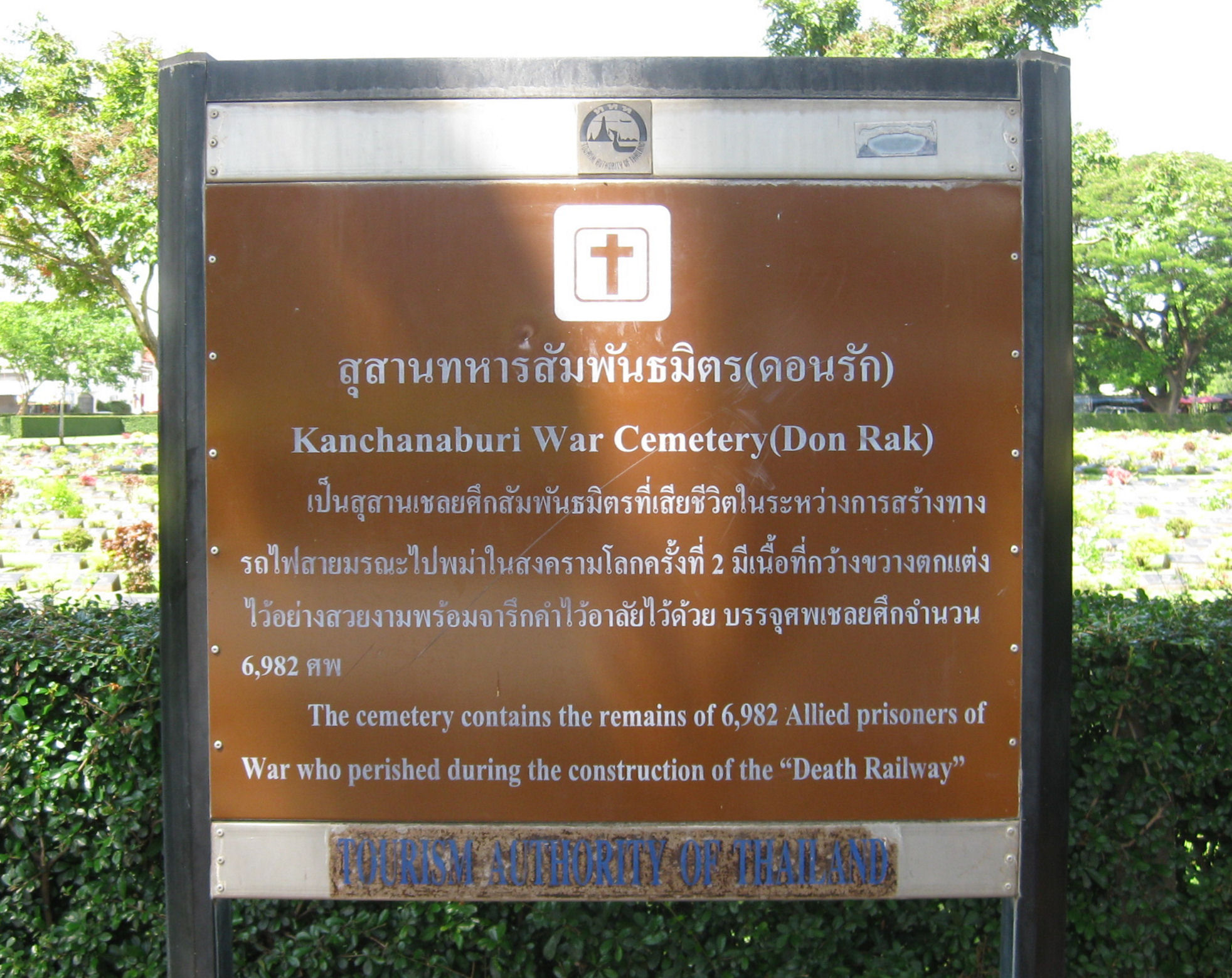
CWGC cemetery at Kachanaburi, Thailand, where many of those who died on the Burma Railway are buried.

The men were imprisoned in Selarang Barracks at Changi, converted into a Prisoner of war camp. In June 1942, 500 men of 135th Fd Rgt were sent to Sime Road Camp to work as labourers on a Japanese war memorial, some of the others remaining at Selarang during the notorious incident. In October a party of 18th Division prisoners, including about 400 of the 135th Fd Rgt were sent to Thailand to work on the Wan Po viaduct across the Mae Klong river on the Burma Railway (immortalised in the book and film The Bridge on the River Kwai). The men of 135th Fd Rgt were progressively split up as the work on the railway was completed in 1943 and parties of PoWs were moved to other labouring jobs in Thailand, Formosa and Japan.

135th Field Regiment lost 67 men killed in action or died of wounds, and a further 159 died while prisoners of the Japanese. The survivors were repatriated after the end of the war in August 1945. Officially it was disbanded in 1947, but the regiment regarded the remembrance service held in December 1945 as its final parade.

== Insignia ==
While part of 135th (Hertfordshire Yeomanry) Field Regiment, officers and men of the Northamptonshire Battery wore the Hertfordshire Yeomanry cap badge, the officers also wearing it beneath the rank badges on their shoulder straps. The Commonwealth War Graves Commission (CWGC) design for headstones for members of the regiment includes both the Royal Artillery and Hertfordshire Yeomanry badges.

== Prominent members ==
- William Cecil, 5th Marquess of Exeter, was appointed officer commanding the Northamptonshire Battery from 1910 until his promotion to command IV East Anglian Brigade in January 1914.
- Ailwyn Fellowes, 3rd Baron de Ramsey was an officer in 336th Fd Bty throughout World War II, being taken prisoner at Singapore.

== Online sources ==
- The Drill Hall Project
- The Long, Long Trail
- The Regimental Warpath 1914–1918
- Land Forces of Britain, the Empire and Commonwealth (Regiments.org)
- Royal Artillery 1939–1945 (archive site)
