= 4th East Anglian Brigade, Royal Field Artillery =

IV East Anglian Brigade, Royal Field Artillery
- Active: 1908–1919
- Country: United Kingdom
- Branch: Territorial Force
- Role: Field artillery
- Part of: 54th (East Anglian) Division
- Engagements: WWI: Western Front; Sinai and Palestine Campaign

Commanders
- Notable commanders: William Cecil, 5th Marquess of Exeter

The IV East Anglian Brigade (4th East Anglian Brigade) of the Royal Field Artillery was a unit of Britain's Territorial Force (TF) from 1908 to 1919. It served in the Sinai and Palestine Campaign during World War I.

== Origin ==
When the Territorial Force was created from the former Volunteer Force under the Haldane Reforms in 1908, IV East Anglian Brigade was one of the new artillery units raised to support the East Anglian Division. All the Volunteers transferred to the new artillery brigade came from former infantry units:

IV East Anglian Brigade

- HQ at 28 St Andrew's Street, Hertford
- 1st Hertfordshire Battery formed at Artillery Buildings, Harpenden Road, St Albans, from elements of the 1st Hertfordshire Volunteer Bn of the Bedfordshire Regiment
- 2nd Hertfordshire Battery formed at Clarendon Hall, Watford, from elements of the 2nd Hertfordshire Volunteer Bn of the Bedfordshire Regiment
- Northamptonshire Battery formed at Drill Hall, Queen's Street, Peterborough from two companies of the 1st Volunteer Battalion, Northamptonshire Regiment

See main article: Northamptonshire Battery, Royal Field Artillery

- IV East Anglian Brigade Ammunition Column formed at Hertford

The Commanding Officer from 21 January 1914 was Lt-Col William Cecil, 5th Marquess of Exeter, a former officer in the Northampton and Rutland Militia (3rd Bn Northamptonshire Regiment) and a Cecil kinsman of the Honorary Colonel, the Marquess of Salisbury (see below). He had commanded the Northamptonshire Battery 1910–14. Before World War I broke out, the brigade was equipped with four 15-pounder field guns to each battery.

== World War I ==
=== Mobilisation ===
The East Anglian Division had begun its annual training on 27 July 1914. When the order to mobilise was given on 4 August, the units returned to their headquarters and then moved to their war stations. By 10 August the division had concentrated around Brentwood, Essex, and on 20 August it moved to Chelmsford and formed part of the coast defences of the UK until the following May. Meanwhile, the formation of duplicate or 2nd Line TF units from Home Service men and recruits had been authorised, and towards the end of 1914 the 2nd East Anglian Division came into existence at Peterborough. The original (1st Line) IV East Anglian Brigade became the 1/IV, and its 2nd Line became the 2/IV East Anglian Brigade.

=== 1/IV East Anglian Brigade ===
The 1st East Anglian Division was employed on coast defence until May 1915, when it was concentrated at St Albans preparatory to going overseas as the 54th (1st East Anglian) Division. However, when the infantry departed for the Gallipoli Campaign, the divisional artillery was left behind. In August it joined the 2nd Line at Thetford in Norfolk and Brandon, Suffolk, rearmed with modern 18-pounder guns and handed over its obsolete 15-pounders to the 2nd Line batteries.

On 17 November 1915 the 54th Divisional Artillery embarked for France, where it joined 33rd Division, a 'Kitchener's Army' division whose artillery were still under training.

After a month on the Western Front, during which parties of officers and men had been attached for training to other divisions in the Front Line, 54th Divisional Artillery was warned that it was to be transferred to Egypt to rejoin its parent division, which had been withdrawn from Gallipoli. Embarkation began at Marseille on 30 January 1916 and disembarkation was completed at Alexandria by 14 February. The divisional artillery rejoined 54th Division at Mena Camp near Cairo and in April moved into No 1 (Southern) Section of the Suez Canal defences.

On 29 May 1916 the IV East Anglian Brigade was renumbered CCLXXIII (273) Brigade RFA and its batteries became A, B and C. It was renumbered again on 29 December, becoming CCLXX (270), and was reorganised into six-gun batteries. B (1/2nd Hertfordshire) Battery was split up between A (1/1st Hertfordshire) and C (1/1st Northamptonshire), which became B Battery. B (1/2nd Suffolk) Battery joined from CCLXXII (III East Anglian) (Howitzer) Brigade and became C (Howitzer) Battery.

The infantry battalions of 54th Division were slowly brought back up to strength with drafts from home during 1916, and by mid-January 1917 the whole division had assembled at Moascar in preparation for the British invasion of Sinai.

After crossing the Wilderness, the division took part in the First (26–7 March), Second (17–9 April) and Third Battles of Gaza (27 October–7 November) and the final capture of Gaza (1–7 November). At the end of the year the division was engaged in the Battle of Jaffa (21–22 December).

54th Division was next engaged in the action at Berukin (9–10 April 1918). Finally it took part in the opening stage of Allenby's final offensive (the Battle of Megiddo), known as the Battle of Sharon (19–23 September).

The division was then taken out of the line and concentrated at Haifa, where it was engaged in repairing communications for the rapidly advancing army. It next moved to Beirut, where it was concentrating when the Armistice of Mudros was signed with Turkey and hostilities ended on 31 October.

In late November 1918 the division was ordered to return to Egypt, the artillery proceeding by sea and arriving in mid-December. Demobilisation began in January 1919, and the TF units were slowly reduced to cadres. The divisional artillery had disappeared by June.

=== 2/IV East Anglian Brigade ===
Training for the 2nd Line artillery was hindered by the shortage of equipment, and several months passed before guns, horses and harness were received. Even then, only obsolete French De Bange 90 mm cannon were available for training. Early in 1915 the 2nd East Anglian Division (which was numbered 69th in August 1915) concentrated round Thetford, where it formed part of First Army in Central Force. The divisional artillery was distributed around Brandon, Cambridge and Tuddenham. In November the divisional artillery took over the 15-pounder guns released by its 1st Line (see above).

In May 1916, the 2/IV East Anglian Brigade was numbered CCCXLVIII Bde RFA (348 Bde) and the batteries became A, B and C. The following month he division was transferred to Northern Command and moved to Harrogate in North Yorkshire. In the summer of 1917 the divisional artillery moved into camp at Welbeck in Nottinghamshire until winter set in, when they moved into winter quarters around Doncaster and Darlington.

The division's role throughout the war was to train drafts of reinforcements for units serving overseas. By the end of 1917 the 2nd Line TF infantry battalions had been replaced by training units, and from 1 January 1918 the division lost its 'East Anglian' title. The artillery remained around Darlington (later Middlesbrough) and Doncaster. Demobilisation began after the Armistice with Germany, and 69th Division's artillery disappeared before the end of January 1919.

== Postwar ==
When the TF was reconstituted as the Territorial Army in 1920, the two Hertfordshire Batteries were reformed and combined with the converted Hertfordshire Yeomanry to form a new 3rd East Anglian Brigade, RFA, which was soon afterwards designated the 86th (East Anglian) (Hertfordshire Yeomanry) Brigade. The Northamptonshire Battery became 336th (Northamptonshire) Field Battery (Howitzer) in 84th (East Anglian) Brigade, RFA, the rest of which comprised Norfolk units.

== Honorary Colonel ==
The Honorary Colonel of the brigade from 17 February 1909 was James Gascoyne-Cecil, 4th Marquess of Salisbury, who had seen active service in 1900 during the 2nd Boer War.

== Online sources ==
- The Long, Long Trail
- The Regimental Warpath 1914–1918
- Land Forces of Britain, the Empire and Commonwealth (Regiments.org)
