= Tyne Electrical Engineers =

British Army unit

Tyne Electrical Engineers, RE
- Active: 1 September 1860 – present
- Country: United Kingdom
- Branch: Territorial Army
- Type: Searchlight unit
- Role: Coast Defence; Air Defence
- Garrison/HQ: Tynemouth
- Nicknames: Tyne Submarine Miners: * Deep-Sea Pitmen * Fish-Quay Lancers * Mussel Shifters; Tyne Electrical Engineers: *The Electricals * The Tynes * Suicide Brigade
- Engagements: Suakin Expedition; World War I * Home Defence * Western Front * Italian Front; World War II * Battle of France * Battle of Britain * The Blitz * North African Campaign

Commanders
- Notable commanders: Col Sir Charles Palmer

The Tyne Electrical Engineers (TEE) is a Volunteer unit of the British Army that has existed under various titles since 1860. It has been the parent unit for a large number of units fulfilling specialist coastal and air defence roles in the Royal Engineers (RE) and Royal Artillery (RA), many seeing service during both World Wars. TEE companies currently form part of the RE and of the Royal Electrical and Mechanical Engineers in the Army Reserve.

== Early history ==
The 1st Newcastle Engineer Volunteers (EV) was raised at company strength in Newcastle upon Tyne during the first enthusiasm for the Volunteer movement engendered by the invasion scare of 1859; its officers' commissions were dated 1 September 1860. The first volunteers came from Armstrong's engineering works at Elswick. The company was attached for administrative purposes to the 1st Newcastle upon Tyne Rifle Volunteer Corps.

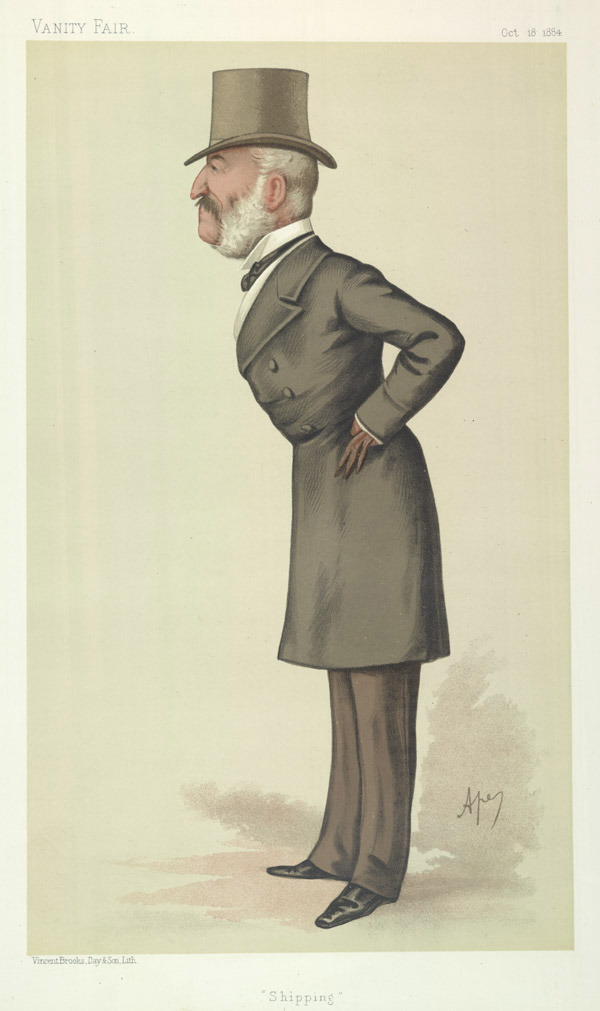
Caricature of Sir Charles Palmer by Ape published in Vanity Fair in 1884

Eight years later, another unit was formed at Jarrow on the opposite (County Durham) bank of the River Tyne. The 1st Durham EV was raised and commanded by Charles Palmer (1822–1907), founder of Palmers Shipbuilding and Iron Company and later the first mayor and Member of Parliament for Jarrow. The 1st Durham initially comprised six companies and Palmer was commissioned as Lieutenant-Colonel Commandant.

By 1874, the Newcastle (1 Company) and Durham (8 Companies) units were united into the 1st Durham Administrative Battalion EV, consolidated in 1880 as the 1st Newcastle upon Tyne and Durham EV, with Palmer as commanding officer and an establishment of 1300 men.

== Submarine miners ==
Lieutenant-General Sir Andrew Clarke, Inspector-General of Fortifications 1882–6, did not have enough Regular Royal Engineers (RE) to man the fixed minefields being installed to defend British ports. He decided to utilise the Volunteer Engineers for this task, and the first experiments were carried out in February 1884 on the Tyne with Palmer's 1st Newcastle & Durham EV. By 1886, one of the companies was designated as submarine miners. The system was successfully rolled out to defend other ports around the country. Later units of Submarine Miners were drawn from the Regulars, the Militia and the Volunteers.

In 1885, Clarke also sent Volunteers to the Red Sea port of Suakin to assist the Regular REs in railway construction in support of the British force engaged there. The detachment of 40 men was drawn from the 1st Newcastle & Durham EV and the 1st Lancashire EV.

Palmer, by now created Sir Charles Palmer, 1st Baronet of Grinkle Park, retired from the unit in 1888 with the rank of Colonel. The same year, the 1st Newcastle & Durham was split into three separate units: the 1st Newcastle RE (Volunteers), the 1st Durham RE (V), and the Tyne Division RE (V), Submarine Miners, with Palmer as Honorary Commandant of both the latter units. The Tyne Submarine Miners consisted of three companies and a number of working boats, and was based at Clifford's Fort, North Shields. Both the 1st Newcastle RE and the Tyne Submarine Miners derived their seniority from the original 1st Newcastle EV established in 1860.

The full dress uniform of the Tyne Submarine Miners consisted of the usual Volunteer RE pattern scarlet tunic with blue facings, white cords and shoulder cords, with the addition of the letters S.M. and the word "TYNE" on the shoulder straps, and a silver grenade badge worn on the right arm by NCOs and trained sappers. The working dress comprised a blue reefer jacket, blue woolen Guernsey sweater, Navy pattern trousers and leather knee-boots, and a Navy pattern cap with a ribbon bearing the words 'Submarine Miners'. Some fishermen recruited at Cullercoats for their skills as boatmen only wore the latter uniform.

== Electrical Engineers ==
In 1895, a searchlight was installed at Clifford's Fort to illuminate the fixed minefield. At first, the light was manned by Regulars of the Coast Battalion, RE; however, by 1897, these duties were taken on by the Submarine Miners. In 1902, the number of searchlights on the Tyne was increased to four, to cooperate with coast artillery as well as to light the minefield. Meanwhile, a specialist volunteer unit (the London Electrical Engineers (LEE)) had been formed to develop searchlight defences. When the submarine mine defences were scrapped in 1907, the Tyne Submarine Miners were redesignated Tyne Electrical Engineers (TEE), one of six new Volunteer RE divisions of that specialism converted from submarine miners.

In 1906, the unit developed a mobile searchlight and generator mounted on a petrol lorry chassis. This equipment was tested for coast defence operations at Portsmouth, and in conjunction with an RE balloon section on Salisbury Plain. Mobile searchlights became standard equipment the following year.

When the Territorial Force (TF) was established in 1908, the Electrical Engineers were to have been redesignated Fortress Engineers, but this was rescinded in the case of London and the Tyne, and the LEE and TEE remained in the order of battle, though the TEE transferred one Electric Light Company to the Durham Fortress Engineers. By January 1914, the TEE had four companies based at North Shields. The unit was known locally as 'The Electricals' or 'The Tynes'.

== World War I ==
In the period of tension in late July 1914 before the outbreak of World War I, two 'special service detachments' of the TEE were mobilised, one taking its place in the Tyne Garrison, the other travelling to man defence lights at Portsmouth. When war was formally declared on 4 August, the remainder of the unit mobilised, No 1 Company in the Tyne defences, Nos 2–4 at Portsmouth, based at Haslar Barracks on the Gosport side of the harbour.

=== Tynemouth ===
Clifford's Fort remained the TEE's depot, from where the flood of volunteers were sent to Haslar for advanced training. No 1 Company also carried out a range of duties in the Tyne Garrison, such as installing electric generators for the hutted camps, signal stations and hospitals springing up in NE England. When the Hospital Ship Rohilla ran aground of Whitby in October 1914, the TEE set up a searchlight on the clifftop to help rescue operations, while Captain H.E. Burton of the TEE took the Tynemouth Lifeboat Henry Vernon in to help take off survivors. Apart from many awards made to those directly concerned in the "Rohilla" disaster, Major Burton received the Gold Medal of the R.N.L.I., the thanks of the Lords of the Admiralty and his services entered in the records by order of the Army Council, Gold Medal of the Borough of Tynemouth and clasp to Gold Medal of the Tynemouth Trust and silver tea and coffee service by public subscriptions. Later, he was awarded the American Gold Cross of Honour, given once in two years by the United States to a foreign national. This was only the second occasion for such an award. His task completed, he resigned from active life-boat service, knowing that the local men, led by Coxswain Smith, shared his faith in the powered boat.

The second world war brought new responsibilities; the Tyne defence and the work in Training Schools. Here, his specialised knowledge of engineering, signalling, telephony, bombing and anti-gas instruction made heavy demands on him. As Commandant, with six instructors, the strength went up to well over a thousand. The measure of his work may be judged by the fact that 10,000 officers and 18,000 NCOs passed through the schools. Apart from other awards, for these services he received the O.B.E., the Coronation Medal as a personal gift from the King and the E.G.M. for gallantry, later exchanged by the King for the George Cross.

Burton was awarded the Empire Gallantry Medal in 1924, which was converted into the George Cross in 1940. He was also awarded the Tynemouth Medal Trusts Gold medal and bar. Here, is an extract from the TMT files. "Captain HERBERT EDGAR BURTON, Royal Engineers (Tyne Submarine Miners) - For gallant service in the Tynemouth Lifeboat “Henry Vernon” on the occasion of the wreck of the steamship “Dunelm” at Blyth on 11 January 1913. The steamship ran ashore in a severe storm on the Sow and Pig Rocks outside of the North Pier at Blyth. Rescue from the shore was proving very difficult and several men were injured in the attempts. Later one rescuer died, so a message was sent to Tynemouth to ask for the motor lifeboat to come and try a rescue in seas where the local pulling lifeboats could not live. The lifeboat set out from the Tyne in atrocious weather under the command of Robert “Scraper” Smith, with Captain Burton on board as mechanical superintendent to tend the engine. By the time they reached Blyth, however, the crew had been rescued. The next morning the lifeboat returned to the Tyne through still mountainous seas and Coxswain Smith was badly injured by a sea which came on board. For their efforts, the following awards were made by the Tynemouth Medal Trust : To Captain Burton, the second Gold Medal; to Coxswain Smith, Frederick Luter of the crew of the “Dunelm” and Coastguard William Marsden of Blyth Coastguard, Silver Medals; to J.G. Smith, Thomas Cummings, J.R. Grant, J.R. Brownlee, and J.S. Brownlee, all of the crew of the Tynemouth lifeboat, Anthony Nixon, Robert Lisle Dawson, Ralph Macarthy, George Renner Armstrong, Adam Robertson and Emanuel Morgan Kelsey, Parchment Certificates. Captain Burton had previously been awarded the Tynemouth Medal Trust's silver medal in August 1904. In 1914, he was also awarded a bar, the only bar awarded to date (1998) to his gold medal for the rescue of part of the crew of the hospital ship “Rohilla” at Whitby."

Early in the war, a new minefield was laid in the mouth of the Tyne by the Royal Marines and the TEE. Former submarine miners of the TEE were transferred or recalled, and provided many instructors for the new Royal Marine Submarine Miners, who laid and maintained minefields at anchorages all down the east and Channel coasts of the UK during World War I.

Also spun out of the TEE was the Northern Command School of Bombing, Signalling and Telephony, and Field Engineering, commanded by Major Burton (see above) until the end of the war.

The first German night air raids on the UK occurred on 19/20 January 1915. The first Anti-Aircraft (AA) searchlight in the Tyne Garrison was set up the following month by the RE on the roof of the CWS Flour Mills at Dunston, and later handed over to the TEE. This was an oxy-acetylene light. The first Zeppelin air raid on Tyneside, by Kapitanleutnant Mathy in L9, was on 14 April, and casualties were few. Afterwards an electric searchlight was set up at Carville power station, Wallsend, to work with a 3-inch AA gun operated by the Royal Garrison Artillery. This installation had just been completed when the second air raid on Tyneside took place on 15/16 June. Warning and blackout arrangements were inadequate, and L10 under Kapitanleutnant Hirsch caused considerable damage and casualties to industrial sites, including Palmer's.

The TEE at Clifford's Fort continued to be responsible for coast defence and AA searchlights and for telephones in the Tyne Garrison throughout the war, comprising No 1 (Depot), No 3 (Electric Light) and No 4 (AA) Companies, the latter later being split into Nos 34 and 35 (Tyne) AA Companies. The coastal defences were progressively increased, especially at Sunderland and Blyth.

=== Haslar ===
One of the first duties of the TEE on arrival at Portsmouth was to set up telephone links. During the war, the TEE telephone section based at Milldam Barracks, Portsmouth, became responsible for the entire military telephone system for the Southern Coast Defences, including Portsmouth, Southampton and the Isle of Wight. The skills of the former submarine miners were employed when a cable linking the sea forts had to be repaired.

The remainder of the TEE sent to Portsmouth on the outbreak of war supplemented the Hampshire (Fortress) Engineers (TF), manning a number of coastal light stations on both shores of the Solent and the three sea forts of Spitbank Fort, No Man's Land Fort and Horse Sand Fort. In November 1915, the TEE formed an additional company (No 5) from Haslar to supplement the Scottish coast defences of the Firth of Forth and to set up coast and AA searchlights to defend the explosives works at Ardeer. These were handed over to local forces by June 1916

As the war progressed, the London Electrical Engineers (LEE) and Tyne Electrical Engineers (TEE) gradually took full responsibility for the RE's searchlight operations. By December 1915, the LEE set up and ran an experimental establishment, while the TEE took over the RE School of Electric Lighting at Stokes Bay, Gosport. As AA defence became more important, the school's name was changed to AA Searchlight and Sound Locator School, based at Ryde on the Isle of Wight.

=== Western Front ===
In August 1915, a detachment of volunteers from the TEE (72 men) and LEE (39 men) proceeded to join the British Expeditionary Force (BEF) in France. They were formed into 13 small detachments, each assigned to a Field Company, RE to operate small oxy-acetylene searchlights to detect enemy raiding parties in No-Man's Land. Although these were used with some success for a few months, exposing a light drew heavy fire from the enemy, and the dangerous work earned the detachments the nickname of 'the suicide brigade'.

In November 1915, a joint LEE/TEE company was formed for service in France, designated No 1 (London and Tyne) Electrical & Mechanical Company, RE. It assembled at the LEE's HQ in London, and landed at Le Havre on 15 December, where it was attached to General Headquarters (GHQ) of the BEF. It carried out a variety of duties, ranging from installing electric lighting for hospitals, water pumps and laundry equipment, to erecting a printing works and building a trench locomotive. After the Battle of the Somme, it was decided to form an E & M Company for each of the Armies of the BEF and the London & Tyne Company was split to form 351 Company (Second Army) and 354 Company (Fifth Army). 354 Company was later responsible for the development of air-lift and belt water pumps to supply drinking water. During the German spring offensive of 1918, 351 and 354 E &M Companies were entrusted with destroying electrical installations and water supplies ahead of the advancing enemy. These then had to be replaced during the Hundred Days advance.

=== Home AA Defence ===
Prior to the outbreak of war, searchlights were still being used in the coastal defence role, and had yet to be seen as an AA asset, but as early as August 1914 the TEE set up the first AA searchlight in the Portsmouth defences, at Lumps Fort. In the early part of 1915 the TEE was involved in pioneering AA defences in NE England (see above)

In December 1915, the War Office urgently required AA searchlight units to defend London and other vital points. Immediately, the LEE provided No 1 Company and the TEE formed No 2 (Tyne) Company, which took over responsibility for NW London in May 1916. Further companies were despatched at intervals to London, Hull and other districts subject to Zeppelin raids. Early in 1916, mobile AA brigades began to be formed, with batteries of 13-pounder guns, supported by a searchlight company. No 9 (Tyne) Mobile SL Company was one of the first formed at Haslar, proceeding to London to complete mobilisation on 11 March. In the early stages, the coordination of AA guns and searchlights was poor, but improvements were made, a barrage of lights was established down the East Coast, and searchlight units soon became adept at picking up Zeppelins. A detachment of No 9 Mobile Company was in action at Darenth when the first Zeppelin destroyed over England (L15, Kapitanleutnant Breithaupt) was shot down into the Thames Estuary by AA guns on 31 March, and members of the detachment were awarded gold medals by the Lord Mayor of London.

In April, the Royal Flying Corps began to form home defence squadrons, and each had a searchlight section attached. The 'aeroplane lights' were trained to work in close cooperation with the aircraft and were distinct from the 'gun lights'. The TEE formed No 33 (Tyne) AA Company to cooperate with home defence aircraft in Northern England, including No 36 Squadron RFC at Cramlington near Newcastle, while No 22 (Tyne) Aeroplane Squadron Searchlight Section from Haslar operated at Sutton's Farm in Essex with No 39 Squadron RFC and at Beverley in East Yorkshire with No 52 Squadron RFC.

On 2 September, the Germans attempted a mass Zeppelin attack on London, but only two airships reached the capital and one of these, SL 11, was held in the searchlight beams of 22 (Tyne) Company while it was shot down by Lt W. Leefe Robinson of 39 Squadron. On 23 September, another mass raid bombed Nottingham, but L32, endeavouring to avoid the London defences, was shot down by 2/Lt F. Sowrey of 39 Squadron cooperating with lights from Nos 9 and 22 Companies.

On 25 September 1916, the only air attack on Portsmouth during World War I occurred when Kapitänleutnant Mathy, this time commanding L31, hovered over the harbour in the searchlight beams, without actually dropping any bombs. By October 1916, the Zeppelin threat had all but ended and the Germans attentions turned to use of bomber aircraft.

Late in 1916, the AA defences of Britain were expanded to include the industrial towns of the North and Midlands. No 2 (Tyne) Company was moved from London to the Midlands and renumbered 42, and a series of new gun light companies were formed, No 4 AA Company TEE being split into Nos 34 and 35 (Tyne) AA Companies, and Nos 37 (Tyne) at Leeds, 38 (Tyne) at Hull and 40 (Tyne) at Sheffield being formed by drafts from Haslar. The mobile companies (including the aeroplane units) were mobilised at the Royal Army Medical Corps HQ at Queen Alexandra Military Hospital at Millbank in London before being despatched around the country.

By July 1917, when German raids by fixed wing aircraft became common, there were 42 AA Companies of the RE located around the country. These included the following TEE units, manning some 300 lights:

- No 9 (Tyne) Mobile Searchlight Company – attached to No 3 Mobile AA Brigade, RGA
- No 10 (Tyne) Mobile Searchlight Company, Harwich
- No 33 (Tyne) Aeroplane Squadron Searchlight Company, Cramlington
- Nos 34–35 (Tyne) AA Companies, Newcastle
- No 37 (Tyne) AA Company, Leeds
- No 38 (Tyne) AA Company, Hull
- No 40 AA Company, Sheffield
- No 41 AA Company, Birmingham
- No 42 (Tyne) AA Company, Coventry – formerly No 2 Company TEE
- No 50 AA Company, Gretna
- No 56 AA Company, York – formerly No 29 (Tyne) Aeroplane Squadron Company
- No 57 AA Company, Lincoln – formerly No 25 (Tyne) Aeroplane Squadron Company
- No 58 AA Company, Cranwell – formerly No 22 (Tyne) Aeroplane Squadron Company
- No 60 AA Company, Selby – formerly No 27 (Tyne) Aeroplane Squadron Company
- No 63 AA Company, Nottingham

In November 1917, the air defences of Great Britain were reorganised: the number of AA searchlight companies was considerably reduced, instead RE sections were attached to the AA gun batteries, while 12 new AA companies of the RE were formed. The TEE units in the new organisation were as follows:

London Air Defence Area

- No 1 Mobile Brigade, HQ at Epping, with Nos 8, 9 & 10 Batteries
- No 2 Mobile Brigade, HQ at Sevenoaks, with Nos 7, 11 & 12 Batteries
- Portsmouth AA defences

Northern Air Defences

- Tyne AA Defence Command
  - No 1 AA Company, RE, HQ at Newcastle, covering Alnwick to Hartlepool, cooperating with 36 Sqn RFC – formed from Nos 34 and 35 AA Company
  - No 19 AA Company, RGA – formed from No 34 AA Company
  - No 20 AA Company, RGA
  - No 21 AA Company, RGA – formed from No 50 AA Company
- Leeds AA Defence Command
  - No 2 AA Company, RE, HQ at Ripon – formed from No 37 AA Company
  - No 3 AA Company, RE, HQ at York – formed from Nos 56 and 60 AA Companies
  - No 24 AA Company, RGA – formed from No 37 AA Company
  - No 25 AA Company, RGA – formed from No 37 AA Company
  - No 28 AA Company, RGA – formed from No 60 AA Company
- Humber AA Defence Command
  - No 4 Company, RE, HQ at Gainsborough, cooperating with 33 Sqn RFC – formed from Nos 38 and 57 AA Companies
  - No 27 AA Company RGA – formed from No 38 AA Company
- Nottingham AA Defence Command
  - No 5 AA Company, RE, HQ at Grantham, cooperating with 38 Sqn RFC – formed from No 58 AA Company
  - No 29 AA Company, RG – formed from No 40 AA Company
  - No 30 AA Company, RGA – formed from No 57 AA Company
  - No 33 AA Company, RGA – formed from No 63 AA Company
- Birmingham AA Defence Command
  - No 12 AA Company, RGA – formed from No 41 AA Company

During 1918, enemy air raids were concentrated on London and Norfolk, and the Northern Air Defences were hardly involved. On 19 May, No 9 Mobile Battery, operating under the Dover AADC, was engaged when 40 Giant and Gotha bombers made the biggest raid of the war; the battery illuminated 24 of these raiders during the night, when eight were shot down. 2nd Lieutenant Metcalf of the TEE, commanding this battery, developed a new system of height determination, which was adopted throughout the AA defences.

=== Western Front AA defence ===
Between 1915 and 1918, the RE formed 76 AA Searchlight Sections for overseas service. The TEE is known to have found 21 of these: Nos 6, 8, 10, 11, 13, 15, 17, 19, 20, 26–8, 32, 34, 36, 38, 40, 42, 44 and 46, together with No 22, which was formed in France from Nos 1–8 AAS sections. Others were formed by the Regular RE (No 1) and by the LEE. The parent units of a further 29 AAS sections are not known, but the cadres were probably mixed TEE and LEE personnel.

Most of the early AAS sections were posted to guard targets such as railway yards, ammunition dumps and lines of communications that were the target of night bomber attacks. When No 19 Section arrived in France in March 1917, it was stationed at a large ammunition dump at Zeneghem, but was given the additional task of setting up a dummy target. This consisted of rows of electric lights on poles laid out to resemble the real dump; when bombers approached these lights were the last to be blacked out, in imitation of the dump receiving the alarm late. Dummy rail tracks were laid and the decoy target was protected by 12 AA guns; on one occasion, paraffin fires were lit to resemble a successful raid on the 'dump'. The area around Nieuport and Dunkirk, where many of the supply dumps were concentrated received regular raids, and 14 AAS sections were concentrated on this part of the front.

During and after the 3rd Battle of Ypres, some of the searchlights were established close to the front, to illuminate bombers as they crossed the lines. These light sections regularly became bombing targets themselves. During the winter of 1917–18, some sections were moved south from the Ypres Salient to the Somme area around Bapaume and Péronne, though enemy night activity in this sector was low. One morning, a German aircraft bombed horse lines near to No 17 (Tyne) AASS, and was shot down by Sapper G. Bage using a Lewis gun. Sapper Bage was awarded the Military Medal.

When the German spring offensive opened on 21 March 1918, Nos 8, 10 and 15 (Tyne) AASS were with Third Army around Bapaume, and No 17 with Fifth Army at Péronne. These sections had to be withdrawn hastily ahead of the advancing Germans. No 10 AASS retired to Méaulte, where Third Army HQ was subject to continuous night bombing and the lights themselves were bombed and machine-gunned. On 25 March, in the face of German advances and the absence of transport, No 10 AASS had to disable its equipment and withdraw.

The second phase of the German offensive (the Battle of the Lys) hit First Army and Second Army, and here Nos 11 and 44 (Tyne) AASS and No 14 (London) AASS were forced to retreat under enemy artillery fire. After the German advance was halted, the AA defences were re-established, with a belt of searchlights now cooperating with AA guns and with Sopwith Camel night-fighter aircraft (forming the 'Camel Line'). Each searchlight team was also equipped with a Lewis gun for AA defence. The number of enemy night bombers brought down began to rise.

The Allied advances of the Hundred Days Offensive meant that to maintain an unbroken AA barrage along the whole front the searchlight sections were frequently shifted forwards through traffic-clogged roads, across damaged bridges, often under shell-fire. After the Armistice, the lights were found useful for illuminating round-the-clock work by sappers to repair bridges and railways. Several sections moved into Germany with the British Army of the Rhine, and some were used in policing river traffic on the Rhine. Demobilisation began early in 1919 and the last AAS sections were demobilised at Haslar in March 1920.

=== Italy ===
In January 1918, No 34 AASS was transferred from France to join the British forces on the Italian Front. The men were split up to train Italian searchlight teams, but this was not a success. At the end of March, three sets of highly mobile Italian equipment were purchased, and the section operated these for the rest of the war. German night bombers were withdrawn from the Italian Front in April 1918, but No 34 AASS acted as directors for Allied night insertion operations by air, and in front-line illumination for heavy artillery.

=== Independent Air Force ===
During May 1918, the RAF's Independent Air Force was established at airfields in Lorraine for strategic bombing of Germany. The airfields in turn were frequently bombed, and AA guns and AAS sections, including No 27 (Tyne), were sent to help defend them, joined in August by No 10 (Tyne) AASS.

=== Manpower ===
When GHQ in France requested an increase in AA searchlight provision in August 1917, the shortage of manpower meant that the new sections consisted of approximately 30 per cent TEE and LEE personnel and 60 per cent Medical Category B personnel transferred from the infantry and trained in the existing sections. Canadian and US sappers were also attached to the sections for training during 1918.

As the war progressed, most of the 'A1' category men in home forces were withdrawn for overseas duty, and the AA defences were manned by personnel of lower medical category. A large contingent of the Women's Army Auxiliary Corps took over administrative duties at the Haslar depot and the AA establishments, while the Women's League provided motor transport drivers. Late in 1918, a large draft of men was dispatched to France from Haslar, intended to reinforce infantry units, but they were appropriated by the Inspector of Searchlights on arrival and sent to searchlight sections. At the time of the Armistice, the TEE comprised 143 officers and approximately 5,000 other ranks, of whom 50 officers and 700 other ranks were serving overseas.

During the war, the TEE established a war savings scheme, which became one of the largest in the army. Two military aircraft were named after the TEE in recognition of these deposits.

== Interwar ==
The Territorial Force was re-established and renamed the Territorial Army after the war. Recruitment to the postwar TEE commenced on 16 February 1920, but it was not until November that year that the title and establishment of the revived unit was fixed as:
Tyne Electrical (Fortress) Royal Engineers

- No 1 Works Company
- No 2 Electric Light Company

Responsibility for fortress telephones came under the new Royal Corps of Signals. The former Durham Fortress Engineers at Jarrow was not reformed at this time and was subsumed into the TEE until 1947.

In the coal strike of April 1921, a Defence Force was raised from the Territorials, with personnel from the TEE forming an HQ and two Electrical and Mechanical (E&M) Companies, whose role would have been to run electricity generation and water supply plant if required. Apart from erecting some barbed-wire defences, the companies were never actually employed, and were demobilised after three months.

Postwar, a TA air defence organisation had been established in the London area, with the LEE forming 26 and 27 AA Battalions, RE (301–306 AA Searchlight Companies). Further independent AASL companies were then organised in other parts of the UK. In September 1924, the TEE's No 1 Works Company was more than doubled in size and converted back into a searchlight unit, designated 307th (Tyne) AASL Company, RE (Tyne Electrical Engineers). (The other independent companies were numbered 309–18: the number 308 was kept vacant in case of expansion of the TEE). No 307 AASL Company and No 2 (later No 1) Electric Light Company remained part of the TEE as a single corps, but each was responsible to a different command structure.

Because of the inconvenient location of Clifford's Fort, the unit also used a small drill hall at Rockcliffe Avenue, Whitley Bay, formerly the HQ of G Company of the disbanded Northern Cyclist Battalion, which the TEE shared with a squadron of the Northumberland Hussars. In 1927, the TEE exchanged Clifford's Fort for a new site adjoining Tynemouth station, where it built a new HQ.

On 10 December 1936, as part of the expansion of AA defences in the TA, 307 AA Company was expanded into a full battalion, 37th (Tyne) AA Bn (Tyne Electrical Engineers), RE (TA), with HQ, 307 and 308 Companies at Station Rd, Tynemouth, and 348 and 349 Companies at Heaton, Newcastle. The battalion formed part of 30th (Northumbrian) AA Group (later Brigade) based at Sunderland, in 2 AA Division.

At about the same time (certainly by 1941) No 1 Electric Light and Works Company was redesignated 128 Electrical and Mechanical Company, RE (Tyne Electrical Engineers) and became an independent unit.

When the TA doubled in size following the Munich Crisis, the TEE formed a duplicate unit as a Light Anti-Aircraft (LAA) regiment of the Royal Artillery (RA). This was designated 37th (Tyne Electrical Engineers) LAA Regiment, RA (TA).

== World War II ==
=== 37 Searchlight Regiment ===
In common with other AA units of the RE, 37th AA Battalion was transferred to the Royal Artillery early in 1940, becoming 37th (TEE) Searchlight Regiment, RA. The Battle of France had already begun when 37 S/L Regiment embarked for France. Part of the regiment landed at Dunkirk on 16 May 1940, but because of the rapid advance of the Germans, they were withdrawn to take up positions protecting Le Havre while the main BEF was being evacuated from Dunkirk. Other parts of the regiment subsequently landed at Cherbourg and were deployed in Normandy. By now, Le Havre was under continuous bombing attacks, and detachments of 37 S/L Regiment were deployed to reinforce the ground defences. On 9–10 June, the regiment was withdrawn to St Malo, the detachments north of the River Seine destroying their equipment and escaping by sea to Cherbourg. On 17 June, the regiment destroyed its remaining equipment and was evacuated to Southampton, one of the last British units to leave France. Some of the regiment's personnel were aboard the Lancastria when she was sunk off St Nazaire, but all except two were rescued.

37th S/L Regiment was re-equipped and deployed to defend South Wales and the Severn Valley, where it remained until early 1944.

In May 1944, the regiment transferred to Essex, where from June it was in action against 'Divers', the codename for V-1 flying bombs. In the winter of 1944–45, the regiment was deployed to establish a searchlight line along the Essex and Suffolk coast to support the AA guns engaging the V-1s. 'Diver' alerts continued until the end of March 1945. After VE Day, the regiment moved to Widnes, except one battery conducting War Office trials.

37 Searchlight Regiment was placed in suspended animation in 1947.

=== 37 Light Anti-Aircraft Regiment ===
37 LAA Regiment was still in course of formation at Tynemouth when World War II broke out in September 1939. During the winter of 1939–40, detachments of the regiment were deployed to RAF stations and other vital points in North East England, which they defended during the Battle of Britain and The Blitz.

In May 1941, the regiment handed over its VPs and began training for mobile warfare. At the end of August it embarked for Iraq, landing at Basra and moving up to Baghdad for further training. Early in 1942, it moved to Lebanon under Ninth Army, and then to Egypt, where its batteries were dispersed defending VPs around the Nile Delta and Suez Canal zones.

After the Second Battle of El Alamein, 37 LAA Regiment concentrated its batteries and followed the subsequent advance of Eighth Army, defending the ports of Benghazi and Tripoli, and then airfields in Tunisia used by the USAAF

37 LAA Regiment returned to training in Egypt and Palestine after the Tunisian Campaign. After the cancellation of operations in the Dodecanese for which it was earmarked, the regiment was disbanded and placed in suspended animation in September 1944.

=== 128 E&M Company ===
This company formed part of the War Office reserve until January 1942. No other details of its service are known. In 1942 stationed in Middle East Force

== Postwar ==
When the TA was reconstituted in 1947, no less than seven units were reformed in the Tyne Electrical Engineers' lineage, in three different corps of the British Army:

- 537 Searchlight Regiment (Tyne Electrical Engineers) RA
- 104 (Tyne) Army Engineer Regiment, RE
- 105 (Northumberland) Construction Regiment, RE
- 132 Field Engineer Regiment, RE – from Durham Fortress Engineers
- 128 Electrical & Mechanical Squadron, RE
- 322 Electrical & Mechanical Squadron, RE
- 86 (Field) Army Group Royal Artillery Workshop (TEE), Royal Electrical and Mechanical Engineers (REME)

=== Royal Artillery ===
537 Searchlight Regiment reformed at Tynemouth as part of 83 AA Brigade (the old 57 LAA Bde at Newcastle). Two years later, it was redesignated as a (Mixed) Light Anti-Aircraft/Searchlight Regiment (the 'mixed' referring to the fact that members of the Women's Royal Army Corps were integrated into the regiment).

When AA Command was disbanded in 1955, the regiment was amalgamated with 669 (Durham) LAA/SL Regiment at South Shields and 670 (Tyneside Scottish, Black Watch) LAA Regiment at Newcastle into 439 Light Anti-Aircraft Regiment, RA (TA):

- HQ Battery – from 537 LAA/SL Regiment
- P (Tyne Electrical Engineers) Battery
- Q (Tyne Electrical Engineers) Battery
- R (South Shields) Battery
- T (Tyneside Scottish) Battery

In 1956, the regiment absorbed 404 (Tynemouth) Coast Regiment, which formed P (Tynemouth) Battery, while Q Battery retained the Tyne Electrical Engineers title. At the same time, the whole regiment adopted the subtitle '(Tyne)'. In 1964, it was redesignated 439 (Tyne) Light Air Defence Regiment, but in 1967 it was amalgamated with several others into 101st (Northumbrian) Medium Regiment and only the Tyneside Scottish lineage was continued.

=== Royal Engineers ===
Two of the RE units reformed in the TA (104 and 105 Regts) were considered descendants of the TEE and took their Army precedence from the 1st Newcastle EV of 1860, while a third (132) was considered to be the successor of the 1st Durham EV. The three units together comprised 22 Engineer Group in Northern Command, based at Gateshead:
104 (Tyne) Army Engineer Regiment, RE

- HQ Gateshead
- 303 Field Squadron
- 304 Field Squadron
- 307 Field Squadron – transferred to 118 Construction Regiment 1950
- 317 Field Park Squadron

105 (Northumberland) Construction Regiment, RE

- HQ Newcastle
- 233 Construction Squadron
- 234 Construction Squadron
- 507 Construction Squadron
- 508 Plant Park Squadron

132 Field Engineer Regiment, RE

- HQ Sunderland
- 333 Field Squadron – became 608 Field Sqn 1953
- 334 Field Squadron
- 335 Field Squadron – transferred to 118 Construction Regiment 1950
- 336 Field Park Squadron – became 336 Crane Operating Sqn 1956

In 1950, 104 and 105 Regiments were amalgamated as 105 Construction Regiment, which in 1955 was redesignated 105 (Tyne Electrical Engineers) Engineer Regiment, RE. The independent 128 Squadron RE based on Tyneside was attached to the regiment as a field squadron from 1955 to 1961. The other independent squadron at Newcastle, 322 Sqn, was probably disbanded before 1961.

In 1957, 132 Field Engineer Regiment was redesignated a Corps Engineer Regiment, but in 1961 it was disbanded and the remnants absorbed into 233 Squadron of 105 (TEE) Regiment.

In the reduction of the TA and formation of the Territorial and Army Volunteer Reserve (TAVR) in 1967, 105 Regiment and 128 Squadron together were reduced to create 105 (Durham) Plant Squadron RE, based at Gateshead and forming part of 72 Engineer Regiment, RE. (The regimental HQ and 103 (Newcastle) Field Squadron came from the former 50th (Northumbrian) Divisional Engineers, descended from the Newcastle RE (V) of 1888, thus uniting the lineages of all the Newcastle and Durham Engineer Volunteers of 1860 and 1874).

In 1999, the whole of 72 Engineer Regiment was reduced to 72 (Tyne Electrical Engineers) Air Support Field Squadron, Royal Engineers in 71 Engineer Regiment, RE.

However, 72 (Tyne Electrical Engineers) Engineer Regiment (V) reformed in 2006 as a Close Support RE regiment, with the following organisation:

- 103 Field Squadron at Newcastle and Sunderland
- 106 Field Squadron at Sheffield and Bradford
- 299 Parachute Squadron at Wakefield and Hull

Under the Future of the British Army (Army 2020) plans, 72 Engineer Regiment was disbanded in 2014, and its squadrons assigned to regular RE regiments: 103 Sqn to 21 Engineer Rgt, 106 Sqn to 32 Engineer Rgt, and 299 Sqn to 23 Parachute Engineer Rgt.

=== Royal Electrical and Mechanical Engineers ===
86 (Field) AGRA Workshop (TEE), REME, was formed in Newcastle in 1947 to support the RA units of 86 (Field) Army Group Royal Artillery (AGRA), a Nottingham-based successor of the wartime 6 AGRA. However, the REME workshop continued an independent existence (as 186 Vehicle Workshop (TEE)) after the disbandment of 86 AGRA in 1956.

In 1967, 186 Vehicle Workshop (TEE) merged with 124 Corps Recovery Company at Gateshead, 149 (Sunderland) Infantry Workshop, 151 Infantry Workshop at Middlesbrough (all of the REME) and 51 Company (Motor Ambulance), Royal Army Service Corps, at Newton Aycliffe. From this merger were formed:

- 124 (Tyne Electrical Engineers) Recovery Company at Newton Aycliffe
- 186 (Tyne Electrical Engineers) Workshop Company at Walker, Newcastle

Both companies formed part of 102 Battalion REME and continue to do so. There are no plans to change this arrangement under the Army 2020 proposals.

However, under the Army 2020 Refine (announced in 2015/16), 186 Coy was reduced to 186 (B) (Tyne Electrical Engineers) Detached Platoon in Newcastle under 124 (Tyne Electrical Engineers) Theatre Support Company in Newton Aycliffe.

== Insignia ==
In December 1911, War Office authority was obtained for officers of the Tyne Electrical Engineers to have the word 'TYNE' embroidered on the scroll beneath the RE grenade badge in place of the honour 'UBIQUE' worn by the Regular RE. The word 'TYNE' was also added beneath the 'T/RE' of the shoulder titles of all ranks.

On 31 October 1922, the crest of the Tyne Electrical Engineers was registered at the College of Arms: 'issuant out of a mural crown or, a dexter cubit arm grasping a winged arrow inflamed proper'. In the old crest carved above the gateway to Clifford's Tower, the arm had been grasping a thunderbolt: this was the form used by the Submarine Mining Service and was derived from the crest of the Master-General of the Ordnance used on the Blue Ensign flown by RE vessels.

During World War II, 37 S/L Regiment wore a regimental arm flash of a stylised lighthouse with one beam pointing upwards, embroidered in yellow with a black edging.

On formation in 1947, 537 LAA/SL Regiment wore an additional arm title bearing the word 'TYNE' embroidered in red on navy blue beneath the normal RA shoulder title. In 1953, this was replaced by the TEE winged arrow crest embroidered in yellow on navy blue, and the unit probably also wore the RA grenade badge with 'Tyne' in place of 'UBIQUE'.

186 Workshop Company still uses the TEE winged arrow crest.

== Traditions ==
The TEE formed a pipe band in 1902, but it was not successful. However, the unit retained two pipers (playing Highland rather than Northumbrian pipes), who wore Clan Fergusson tartan (two of the unit's officers at the time were Fergussons). In 1932, two pipers were again added to the establishment of No 1 Electric Light Company, once more wearing Fergusson tartan with the permission of the Clan chief.

The pipe band was transferred from 72 Engineer Regt to 102 Bn REME in 1999 and is active today.

== Honorary Colonels ==
The following have served as Honorary Commandant or Colonel of TEE units:

- Sir Charles Palmer, 1st Baronet (25 February 1888–died 4 June 1907)
- Alan Percy, 8th Duke of Northumberland (20 March 1912–died 23 August 1930)
- Col. Ernest Robinson, CBE, TD (25 October 1930 – 1935) (see below)
- Matthew White Ridley, 3rd Viscount Ridley (18 December 1935 – 1940)

124 Company (TEE), REME:

- Major David Francis Howard, appointed 1 April 1987.

102 Battalion, REME:

- Col T.G.E. Gillanders, appointed 1 August 2000.

== Commanding officers ==
The following served as Commanding Officer of TEE units:

- Lieutenant-Colonel W. Johnson (3 March 1888 – 31 October 1911)
- Lieutenant-Colonel F.C. Scott (1 November 1911 – 4 February 1915, transferred to Royal Marine Submarine Miners)
- Lieutenant-Colonel C.R. Toomer (5 February 1915 – 30 August 1918)
- Brevet-Colonel E. Robinson (31 August 1918 – 31 October 1925)
- Lieutenant-Colonel N.H. Firmin (1 November 1925 – 31 October 1929)
- Lieutenant-Colonel E.H.E. Woodward (1 November 1929– )
- Lieutenant-Colonel B.H. Leeson (5 November 1938– )

== Prominent members ==
- Lieutenant Sir Ulick Temple Blake, 16th Baronet of Menlough – 37 LAA Regt
- Lieutenant-Colonel Hon J.R.H.T Cumming-Bruce, younger son of 6th Baron Thurlow – 37 LAA Regt
- Major H.E. Burton, GC (see above)
- Captain Viscount Castlereagh (later 8th Marquess of Londonderry) – 37 LAA Regt
- Major I.F. Fairbairn-Crawford, general manager of Armstrong Whitworth Aircraft
- Bombardier George Newby, GM – 37 LAA Regt

== External sources ==
- British Military History
- Land Forces of Britain, the Empire and Commonwealth (Regiments.org)
- The Royal Artillery 1939–45
- 102 Bn REME at British Army Website
- Army Reserve changes and future basing
- British Army units from 1945 on
- Orders of Battle at Patriot Files
- Graham Watson, The Territorial Army 1947
