= 50th (Northumbrian) Signal Regiment =

50th (Northumbrian) Divisional Signals 50 (Northumbria) Signal Regiment 50 (Northumbrian) Signal Squadron
- Insignia of the Royal Corps of Signals (Post-1953)
- Active: 1920–2009
- Country: United Kingdom
- Branch: Territorial Army
- Role: Signals
- Size: Regiment
- Part of: 50th (Northumbrian) Infantry Division; 23rd (Northumbrian) Infantry Division; 34 (Northern) Signal Regiment
- Garrison/HQ: Darlington
- Engagements: Battle of France; Dunkirk evacuation Western Desert Campaign; Tunisian Campaign; Allied invasion of Sicily; Normandy Landings; North West Europe

50 (Northumbrian) Signal Regiment was a Territorial Army (TA) unit of the British Army's Royal Corps of Signals. It had its origins in a signal company and a cyclist battalion formed in 1908 and it provided the divisional signals for the 50th (Northumbrian) Division and its duplicates during World War II. Its successors continued in the postwar TA until 2009.

== Origin ==
When the Royal Corps of Signals (RCS) was created in 1920, the 50th (Northumbrian) Divisional Signals (Note: Divisional signal units of the Royal Signals 1920–45 were battalion-sized and commanded by a Lieutenant-Colonel; they were not termed 'regiments' until 1946.) was formed in the Territorial Army (TA). It combined the former 50th (Northumbrian) Signal Company of the Royal Engineers (RE) with the 5th (Cyclist) Battalion, East Yorkshire Regiment.

When the old Volunteer Force was subsumed into the Territorial Force (TF) after the Haldane reforms in 1908, the 1st Newcastle Engineer Volunteers provided the RE components of the TF's Northumbrian Division, including the Northumbrian (The Newcastle) Divisional Telegraph Company, RE, with the following organisation:

- Company Headquarters (HQ) at Barras Bridge, Newcastle upon Tyne
- No 1 Section at Barras Bridge
- No 2 (Northumberland) Section
- No 3 (York & Durham) Section
- No 4 (Durham Light Infantry) Section

Nos 2–4 Sections were attached to and largely manned by the three infantry brigades of the division. The Telegraph Company was redesignated a Signal Company in 1911.

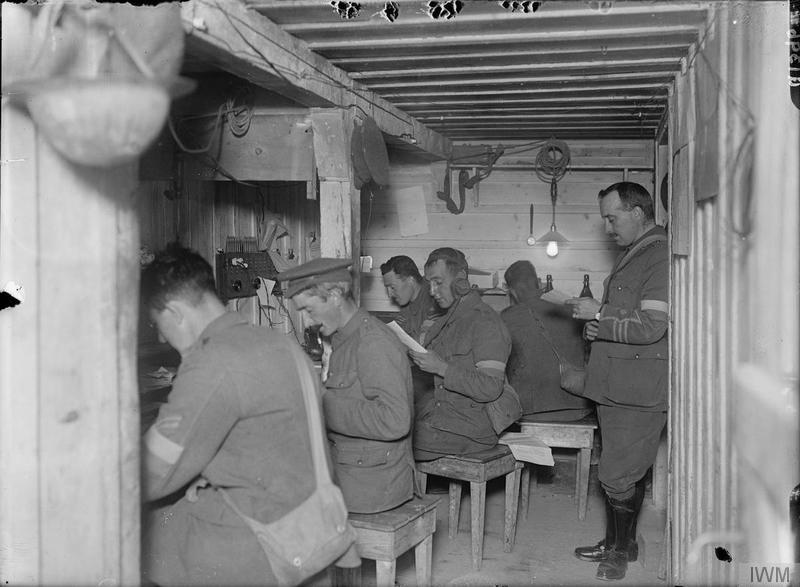
RE Signal Company at work on the Western Front.

The Northumbrian Division mobilised on the outbreak of World War I in August 1914 and in April 1915 it was sent to join the British Expeditionary Force on the Western Front, where it was numbered as the 50th (Northumbrian) Division. The division was immediately sent into action in the Second Battle of Ypres, and was engaged in many of the major actions on the Western Front for the rest of the war, including the later stages of the Battle of the Somme, the Battle of Arras, and the last phase of the Battle of Passchendaele. The division was virtually destroyed during the German spring offensive of 1918. The Divisional RE remained with the 50th while it was reconstituted with units brought back from other fronts. The division re-entered the line for the last month of the Allies' victorious Hundred Days Offensive. It was demobilised in March 1919.

After mobilisation, the TF units of the Northumbrian Division raised 2nd Line units with the same titles as the parents, but with a '2/' prefix, including the 2/1st Northumbrian Divisional Signal Company, RE. These units later constituted the 63rd (2nd Northumbrian) Division, responsible for coastal defence in North East England while supplying drafts to the 50th Northumbrian on the Western Front. However, the drain of supplying drafts was such that the division could not be kept up to strength: in July 1916 it was broken up and its number transferred to the 63rd (Royal Naval) Division. While the RE field companies were sent overseas, 63rd (2/1st Northumbrian) Signal Company was broken up for drafts in the UK.

== Royal Corps of Signals ==
The new 50th (Northumbrian) Divisional Signals was initially formed in 1920, with headquarters at Gateshead, and had absorbed the 5th (Cyclist) Bn, East Yorkshire Rgt by the following year when its HQ moved to 4 West Parade in Hull. It had the following organisation:

- 1 Company at Darlington
- 2 Company at Middlesbrough
- 3 Company at Gateshead

The first Commanding Officer (CO) was Major C.L. Bagnall, a former officer in 9th Battalion, Durham Light Infantry, who had commanded No 4 Section of the company in 1914. He later became the unit's Honorary Colonel.

By the 1930s, 50th (Northumbrian) Signals HQ had moved to the Drill Hall at Darlington and also administered:

- 206th Medium Artillery Signal Section, Drill Hall, The Green, Sunderland
- No 3 (Northumbrian) Air Squadron Signal Section (Supplementary Reserve, (SR)), Elmgrove Terrace Drill Hall, Gateshead-on-Tyne
- No 5 (Northumbrian) Air Squadron Signal Section (SR), Drill Hall, Darlington
- No 12 (Northumbrian) Air Squadron Signal Section (SR)
- No 14 (Northumbrian) Air Squadron Signal Section (SR)

By 1939, the SR units had left, but the unit was responsible for administering two newly-formed TA signal sections at Middlesbrough:

- 271st Army Tank Brigade Signal Section
- 253rd Light Anti-Aircraft Regiment Signal Section

== World War II ==
50th (Northumbrian) Division's formation sign in World War II.

=== Mobilisation ===
Following the Munich Crisis, the TA was doubled in size. Once again, 50th (Northumbrian) Division formed a duplicate, 23rd (Northumbrian) Division, with its own divisional signals. 50th Division was mobilised on 3 September 1939 and 23rd Division became active on 2 October 1939. The unit probably also provided the cadre to form 7th Anti-Aircraft Division Divisional Signals at Darlington.

=== 50th (Northumbrian) Divisional Signals ===
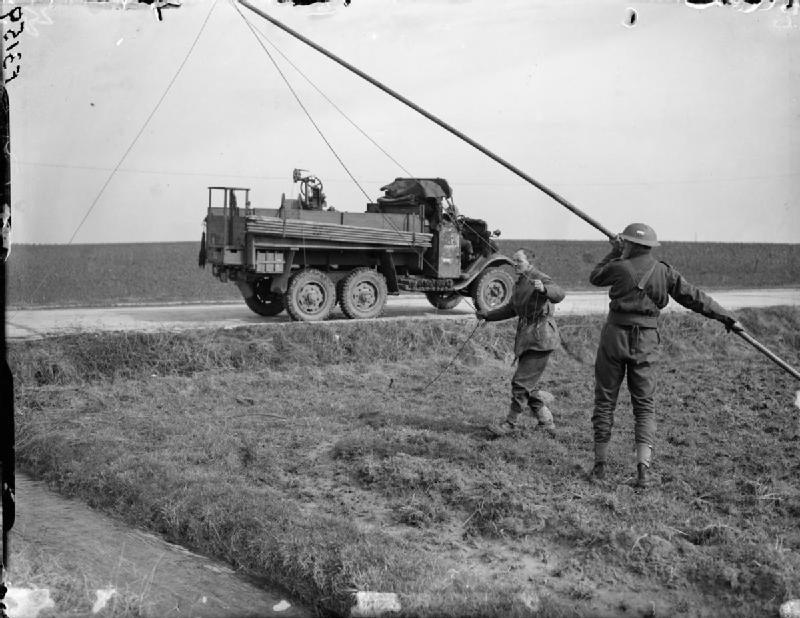
Royal Signals erecting cable poles in France, 1940.

==== Battle of France ====
The 50th Division joined the new British Expeditionary Force (BEF) in France in February 1940. When the Germans attacked in May, the division moved up into Belgium with the rest of the BEF and took up positions on the River Dendre. However, the Germans broke through French lines and the BEF was forced to retreat. By 19 May, 50th Division was moved back to Vimy Ridge north of Arras to prepare for a counter-attack as part of 'Frankforce', in what became known as the Battle of Arras After this brief check, the Germans continued to advance. By now the BEF was cut off from the bulk of the French armies and began its retreat towards Dunkirk. 50th Division guarding an open flank and suffering heavy casualties. The division, less its heavy equipment, was evacuated from Dunkirk on 1 June and landed in the United Kingdom the following day.

==== North Africa ====
After re-equipping and retraining in the United Kingdom, 50th Division sailed on 23 April 1941 to join Middle East Forces. Following spells in Cyprus, Iraq and Syria, it joined British Eighth Army for the Battle of Gazala (26 May–21 June 1942), where part of the division was captured. (Note: 150 Bde, presumably including the signal section attached to brigade HQ.) Eighth Army fell back to the El Alamein position, which it successfully defended. 50th Division then took part in the Second Battle of El Alamein and the subsequent advance across North Africa to Tunisia, including the battles of Mareth and Wadi Akarit.

==== Sicily ====
For the Allied invasion of Sicily, 50th Division was in the first assault wave and then fought its way up the east side of the island, including the Battle of Primosole Bridge. With its experience of amphibious assaults, 50th Division was earmarked for the forthcoming invasion of Normandy (Operation Overlord) and sailed for Britain in October 1943.

==== North West Europe ====
On D Day, 50th Division was heavily reinforced to carry out the landings on Gold Beach. Once off the beach, 50th Division pushed inland towards Bayeux, and then consolidated its gains over the next few days against German counter-attacks. Progress towards Villers-Bocage was held up by strong Panzer units.

For the next two months, the division fought its way slowly through the Bocage country before being relieved on 5 August. However, it was back in action on 9 August, attacking against stiff opposition in the advance beyond Mont Pincon as the Allies closed the Falaise Gap. Once the Seine was crossed and the pursuit began, 50th Division supported 11th Armoured Division's rapid advance, protecting the flank and 'mopping up' local resistance. On 1 September, the division secured bridges over the River Somme near Amiens and reached Arras. On 3 September it took part in the Liberation of Brussels.

More resistance was met at the Albert Canal, and 50th Division had to make an assault crossing in storm boats, following which the infantry pushed on and captured Gheel after bitter fighting. (7–11 September). The division was due to play a minor role in Operation Market Garden, holding the bridgehead from which Guards Armoured Division advanced, and later defending the road and bridge at Nijmegen, but the latter turned into a major defensive battle after the defeat at Arnhem.

The defence of the Nijmegen bridgehead was 50th Division's last operation. It was by now very weak, and in December 1944 it was broken up to provide reinforcements for other units in 21st Army Group. Most of the division's units returned to the UK as training cadres to turn surplus Royal Navy and Royal Air Force personnel into infantry, but divisional HQ and signals was kept together. Divisional Signals was demobilised on 31 July 1945, shortly before divisional HQ went to Norway to become HQ British Land Forces Norway.

=== 23rd (Northumbrian) Divisional Signals ===
23rd (Northumbrian) Divisional Signals did not accompany the division when its infantry were sent to France to act as labour troops in April 1940. They got caught up in the fighting during the retreat to Dunkirk and suffered such heavy casualties in rearguard actions that the division was disbanded at the end of June after its return to England. The divisional signal unit was converted into a training school for non-commissioned officers at Harrogate, in which role it continued until the end of the war.

== Postwar ==
When the TA was reconstituted in 1947, the unit reformed at Darlington from elements of 50th and 23rd Divisional Signals as 50 (Northumbrian) Infantry Divisional Signal Regiment. It adopted the title 50 (Northumbria) Division Signal Regiment in 1956. When the TA was reorganised in 1961, the division became 50th (Northumbrian) Division/District and the regiment (as 50 (Northumbrian) Signal Rgt) absorbed elements of 60th (Mixed) Signals Rgt at York, also taking over responsibility for two brigade signal squadrons:

- 338 Sqn formed at Gateshead in 1959 from 149th Infantry Brigade Signals
- 339 Sqn formed at Middlesbrough in 1959 from 151st Infantry Brigade Signals

When the TA was converted into the Territorial and Army Volunteer Reserve (TAVR) in 1967, the regiment was reduced to 50 (Northumbrian) Signal Squadron in 34 (Northern) Signal Regiment.

34 (Northern) Signal Regiment, in 12 Signal Brigade, had the NATO role of providing communications between the Channel Ports and the rear boundary of I (British) Corps in British Army of the Rhine. After 1993, this became the provision of theatre-level communications support for the Allied Rapid Reaction Corps as part of 11 Signal Brigade. However, 34 Signal Regiment was disbanded in 2009, and the squadron was transferred to 32 (Scottish) Signal Regiment. The squadron was re-titled as 50 (Northern) Signal Squadron, and in 2018 re-subordinated to 37 Signal Regiment.

== Commanding Officers ==
The following served as Commanding Officer of the unit and its successors:

50th (Northumbrian) Divisional Signals

- Maj C.L. Bagnall, DSO, MC, TD, 19 July 1920
- Lt-Col W. Dennis, 1923
- Brevet Col A. MacLeod, 4 September 1925
- Bt Col G.H. Walton, 4 September 1930
- Lt-Col T.T.J. Sheffield, TD, 4 September 1936
- Lt-Col R. Stevenson-Wight, 1941
- Lt-Col A.B. De Lise, 1942
- Lt-Col G.B. Stevenson, 1943
- Lt-Col C.L. Ommanney, OBE, 1944

23rd (Northumbrian) Divisional Signals

- Lt-Col R. Stevenson-Wight

50 (Northumbrian) Infantry Divisional Signal Regiment

- Lt-Col R.M. Percival, TD, 1947
- Lt-Col W.A. Lee, OBE, TD, 1950
- Lt-Col G.F.H. Walker, OBE, TD, 1953

== Honorary Colonels ==
The following served as Honorary Colonel of the unit:

- Maj C.L. Bagnall, DSO, MC, TD, appointed 28 November 1923
- Lt-Col H. Bowes, CB, TD, appointed 25 December 1935
- Brig Sir George Walton, KBE, CB, TD, appointed 1953

50 (Northern) Signal Squadron

- Brigadier Paul Baker, OBE

== External sources ==
- The Long, Long Trail
- Orders of Battle at Patriot Files
- Land Forces of Britain, the Empire and Commonwealth – Regiments.org (archive site)
- Wartime Memories Project
