= 1st Durham Engineers =

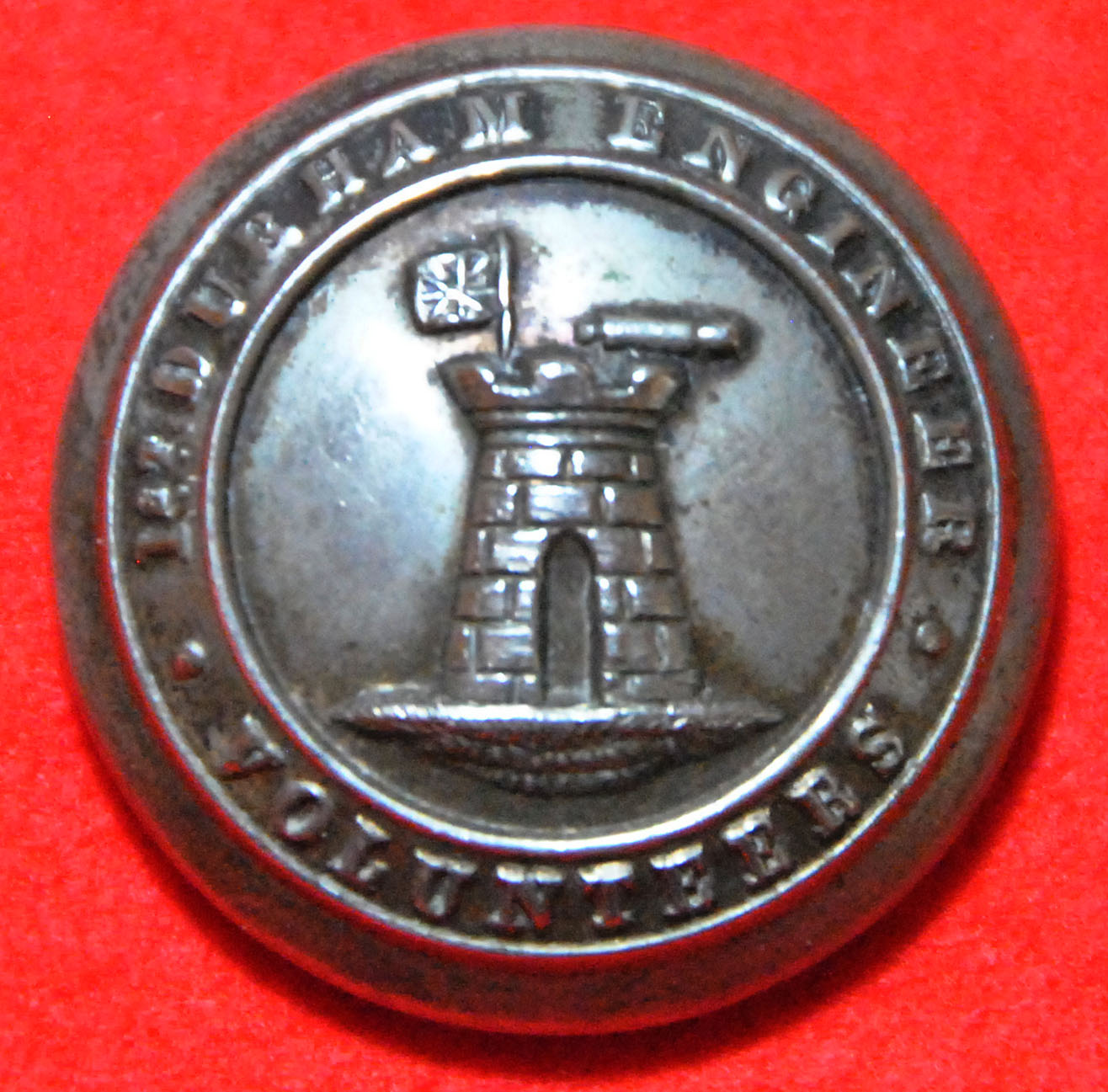
- Tunic button of the 1st Durham Engineer Volunteers
- Active: 1868–1919; 1947–1961
- Country: United Kingdom
- Branch: Territorial Army
- Role: Coast Defence; Field Engineering
- Garrison/HQ: Jarrow
- Engagements: Suakin Expedition; Second Boer War; Western Front (World War I); Italian Front (World War I)

Commanders
- Notable commanders: Sir Charles Palmer, Bt

The 1st Durham Engineers, later Durham Fortress Engineers, was a Volunteer unit of the British Army's Royal Engineers. First founded in 1868 it was sometimes united with the Tyne Electrical Engineers, at other times it formed an independent unit. Although its main role was defence of the North East Coast of England, the unit sent detachments on active service to the Suakin Expedition, the Second Boer War, and the Western Front and Italy during the First World War.

== Volunteer Force ==
In 1868 a new unit of Engineer Volunteers (EV) was formed at Jarrow on the County Durham bank of the River Tyne. The 1st Durham EV was raised and commanded by Charles Palmer (1822–1907), founder of Palmers Shipbuilding and Iron Company and later the first mayor and Member of Parliament for Jarrow. The 1st Durham initially comprised six companies and Palmer was commissioned as Lieutenant-Colonel Commandant.

By 1874 the 1st Durham EV (now 8 companies strong) and the 1st Newcastle EV (1 company) were united into the 1st Durham Administrative Battalion EV, consolidated in 1880 as the 1st Newcastle upon Tyne and Durham EV, with Palmer as commanding officer and an establishment of 1300 men.

In 1885, the Inspector-General of Fortifications, Lieutenant-General Sir Andrew Clarke, sent a detachment of Volunteers to the Red Sea port of Suakin to assist the Regular Royal Engineers (RE) in railway construction for the British force engaged there. The detachment of 40 men was drawn from the 1st Newcastle & Durham EV and the 1st Lancashire EV.

Palmer, by now created Sir Charles Palmer, 1st Baronet of Grinkle Park, retired from the unit in 1888 with the rank of Colonel. The same year, the 1st Newcastle & Durham was split into three separate units: the 1st Durham RE (Volunteers), at Jarrow, and the Tyne Division RE (V), Submarine Miners, at North Shields, with Palmer as Honorary Commandant of both units, together with a new 1st Newcastle-on-Tyne RE (V) at Newcastle.

The 1st Durham RE (V) sent a detachment of one officer and 25 other ranks to assist the regular REs during the Second Boer War in 1900, and a second section the following year.

== Territorial Force ==
When the Volunteers were subsumed into the new Territorial Force (TF) under the Haldane Reforms of 1908, the original plan was for the 1st Durham RE to provide the 1st Northumbrian Field Company and Divisional Signal Company in the TF's Northumbrian Division. However, by 1910 this plan had been altered, and instead the 1st Durham was redesignated the Durham Fortress Engineers, with the addition of an Electric Light Company provided by the Tyne Electrical Engineers (formerly Submarine Miners).

The organisation of the unit on the eve of the First World War was as follows:

Durham Fortress Engineers, RE

- HQ at Western Road, Jarrow
- No 1 Works Company at Jarrow
- No 2 Works Company at Jarrow
- No 3 Works Company at Gateshead

The unit formed part of North Eastern Coastal Defences.

== First World War ==
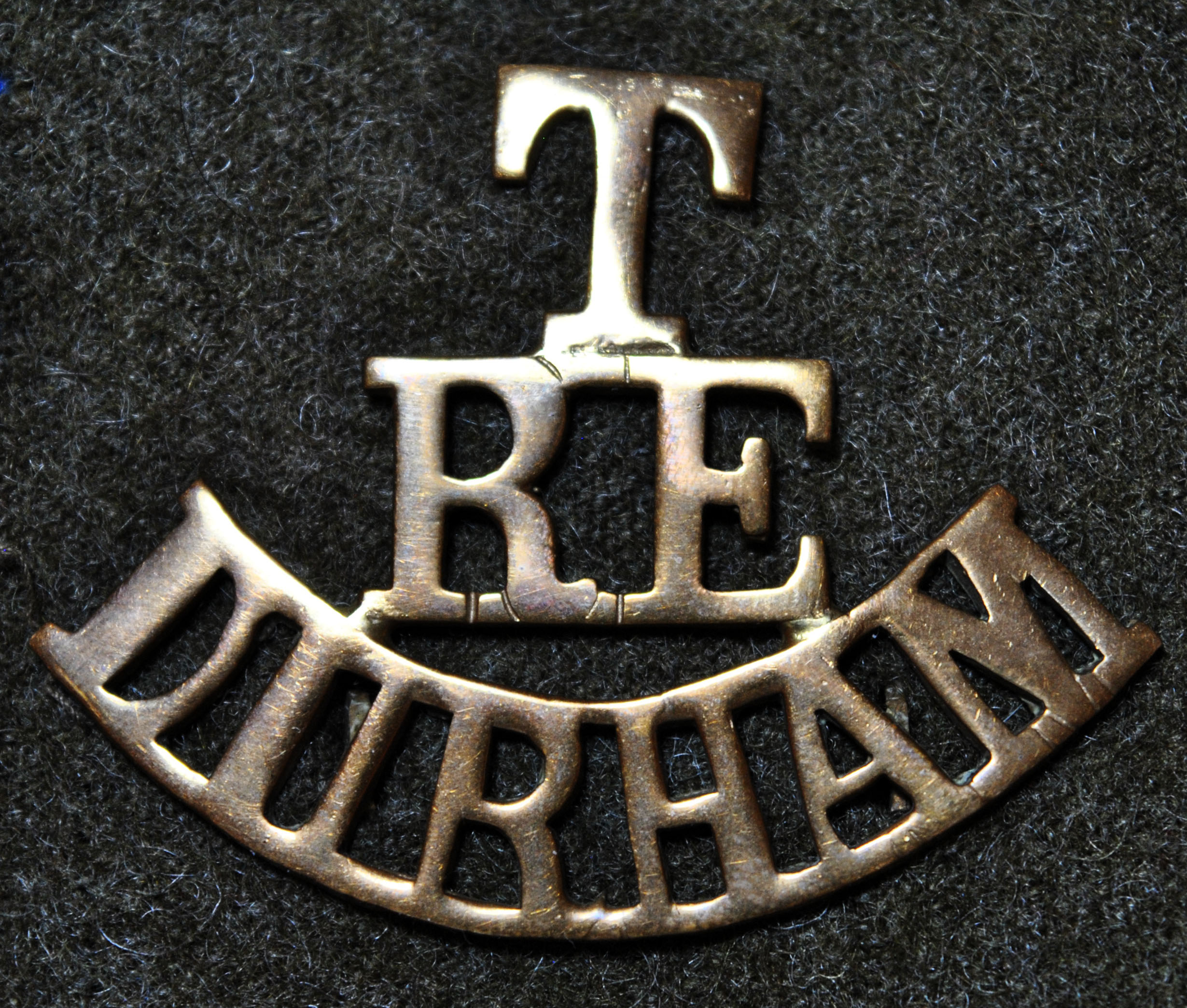
Shoulder title of Durham Territorial Engineers

When the TF was mobilised on the outbreak of war in August 1914, the Durham Fortress Engineers took up their places in the North Eastern Coastal Defences. At first they were employed on constructing field defences, erecting hutted camps, etc. By the summer of 1915 there were three strong lines of entrenchments, bomb-proof shelters and dug-outs linking strongpoints and gun positions along the coast as well as the fixed defences at Tynemouth and Hartlepool. In August 1916 the Durham Fortress Engineers overcame shifting sand dunes to construct Link House Battery to defend Blyth Harbour.

Although the coastal towns of NE England were bombarded by the German Navy on 16 December 1914 (Raid on Scarborough, Hartlepool and Whitby) and by Zeppelins in January and June 1915, it became clear that a fullscale German invasion of Britain was unlikely, while the armies in the field required large numbers of engineers. The Fortress Engineer units therefore began organising field companies for overseas service.

The Durham Fortress Engineers found three field companies, while the remainder of the unit continued to be employed around the Tyne Garrison. These companies were numbered 1st to 3rd (or formally 1/1st to 1/3rd, since they were composed of '1st-Line' Territorials who had volunteered for overseas service) and went to France in September 1915. A 530th (Durham) Reserve Field Company was also formed, from 2nd or even 3rd Line Territorials. This did not proceed overseas, and was probably quickly absorbed into the central training organisation.

=== 1st Durham Field Company ===
1st Durham Field Company joined 4th Division in France on 20 September 1915 and served with it on the Western Front to the end of the war. It was renumbered 526th (Durham) Field Company, RE, in February 1917.

=== 2nd Durham Field Company ===
2nd Durham Field Company joined 5th Division in France on 20 September 1915 and served with it on the Western Front until November 1917, when the division was transferred to the Italian Front. 5th Division returned to the Western Front in April 1918 and fought there until the end of the war. It was renumbered 527th (Durham) Field Company, RE, in February 1917.

=== 3rd Durham Field Company ===
3rd Durham Field Company landed at Le Havre on 18 September 1915 and joined 51st (Highland) Division on 19 September, during the latter part of the Battle of the Somme. On 30 January 1916 it transferred to 7th Division (in exchange for a Highland Field Company) and served with it on the Western Front until November 1917 when the division was transferred to the Italian front. 7th Division then served in Italy until the end of the war. It was renumbered 528th (Durham) Field Company, RE, in February 1917.

== Inter-War period ==
When the TF was reconstituted (as the Territorial Army (TA)) in 1920, the Durham Fortress Engineers was not reformed, but was absorbed into the Tyne Electrical Engineers.

== Post-Second World War ==
When the TA was reconstituted again in 1947, no less than seven units were reformed in the Tyne Electrical Engineers' lineage. These included 132 Field Engineer Regiment, RE, which was considered to be the successor of the Durham Fortress Engineers, with the following organisation:

132 Field Engineer Regiment, RE (TA)

- HQ at Sunderland
- 333 Field Squadron – redesignated 608 Field Squadron in 1953
- 334 Field Squadron
- 335 Field Squadron – transferred to 118 Construction Regiment, RE, in 1950
- 336 Field Park Squadron

The unit formed part of 22 Engineer Group in North East England, which was composed of units derived from the Tyne Electrical Engineers.

On 31 October the regiment was joined by a new field squadron formed by conversion of 426th (Durham) Coast Regiment, Royal Artillery. It was numbered 336 Fd Sqn and absorbed the existing 336 Fd Park Sqn; it was redesignated 336 (Durham Coast) Crane Operating Squadron by 31 December 1956.

The regiment was redesignated 132 Corps Engineer Regiment in 1957, but was disbanded in 1961. 336 Crane Operating Sqn had left the regiment in 1957; in 1965 it transferred to the Royal Corps of Transport. The regiment was disbanded in 1961, 608 Sqn disbanding and 334 Fd Sqn being absorbed into the Sunderland-based 233 Field Squadron of 105 Construction Regiment (Tyne Electrical Engineers).

== Honorary Colonel ==
- Sir Charles Palmer, Bt, appointed 17 November 1888, died 1907.

== Memorials ==
A memorial plaque was set up in Jarrow Town Hall to honour the two service sections of the 1st Durham RE who went to South Africa during the 2nd Boer War.

A war memorial to the men of the Durham Fortress Engineers and the three field companies who served in the First World War was unveiled in Jarrow Drill Hall in 1928. An additional inscription to 233 Field Company, RE, was added after the Second World War. The memorial is now in the RE TA Centre at Debdon Gardens, Gateshead.

== External sources ==
- British Army units from 1945 on
- Great War Forum
- London Gazette
- The Long, Long Trail
- North East War Memorials Project
- Land Forces of Britain, the Empire and Commonwealth (Regiments.org)
- RE Museum
