= 34th (Northern) Signal Regiment =

- Royal Signals Cap Badge
- Active: 1967-2009
- Country: United Kingdom
- Branch: Territorial Army
- Type: Royal Corps of Signals
- Size: 3 Squadrons and band
- Part of: 12 Signal Group; 11 Signal Brigade
- Mottos: Certa Cito (“Swift and Sure”)
- Colors: Sky Blue, Navy and Green (Air, Sea and Land)
- Mascot: Mercury (“Jimmy”)

Insignia
- Tactical Recognition Flash

34 (Northern) Signal Regiment was a Territorial Army regiment in the Royal Corps of Signals in the British Army. The regiment formed part of 12 Signal Group, providing command and control communication for NATO's Allied Rapid Reaction Corps (ARRC). As a result of the Strategic Review of Reserves it was announced on 28 April 2009 that the regiment was to be disbanded The regiment consisted of three squadrons plus the band:

== History ==
The 34th Signal regiment was originally formed in 1967 as a result of the merger between the 50th (Northumbrian), 49th (West Riding), 90th (North Riding) Signals Regiments and 339 Signal Squadron. Upon formation the regiment immediately joined the 12th Signal Group to help provide communications between the Channel Ports and the rear of the 1st British Corps. After the Options for Change the regiment moved to the 11th Signal Brigade where it was the theater communications support regiment for the Allied Rapid Reaction Corps.

== Structure before disbandment ==
- HQ Squadron
- 49 (West Riding) Signal Squadron -- SHQ and 703 (Trunk Node) Troop, Leeds and 745 Troop, Hull
- 50 (Northumbrian) Signal Squadron -- SHQ, Darlington and 742 (Access) Troop, Heaton
- 90 (North Riding) Signal Squadron -- SHQ Hartlepool and 704 (Trunk Node) Troop, Middlesbrough
- Royal Signals (Northern) Band -- Darlington

== Alliances ==
The regiment during its time took a number of affiliations and freedoms including the following:

- Freedom of the City of Teesside
- Freedom of the City of Middlesbrough
- Freedom of the City of Darlington
- Affiliated with the Officers' Training Corps of Leeds University
- Affiliated with the Officers' Training Corps of Northumbria University
