= 1st Newcastle Engineers =

Royal Engineer unit of Britain's Force and Army

1st Newcastle Engineers, RE
- Active: 1 September 1860 – present
- Country: United Kingdom
- Branch: Territorial Army
- Type: Field Engineer
- Role: Divisional Engineers
- Part of: 50th (Northumbrian) Division; 63rd (2nd Northumbrian) Division; 15th Indian Division; 23rd (Northumbrian) Division; 72 (Tyne Electrical Engineers) Engineer Regiment (V)
- Garrison/HQ: Newcastle upon Tyne
- Engagements: Second Boer War; World War I: * Gravenstafel Ridge * St Julien * Frezenberg Ridge * Bellewarde Ridge * Flers–Courcelette * Morval * Le Transloy * Butte de Warlencourt * First Scarpe * Second Scarpe * Second Passchendaele * First Somme (1918) * Rosières * Estaires * Third Aisne * Beaurevoir * Cambrai * Selle * Sambre * Macedonia * Mesopotamia; World War II: * Arras * Dunkirk * Gazala * Mersa Matruh * Alamein * Sicily landings * Primosole Bridge * Normandy landings * Villers-Bocage * Mont Pincon * Operation Market Garden * Operation Plunder

Commanders
- Notable commanders: Col Sir Charles Palmer

The 1st Newcastle Engineer Volunteers, later Northumbrian Divisional Engineers, was a Royal Engineer (RE) unit of Britain's Volunteer Force and Territorial Army founded in 1860. Its companies saw action in both World Wars, particularly at the Battle of Rosières and the assault crossing of the River Selle in 1918, and on D-Day in 1944. Its successors continue to serve in today's Army Reserve.

== Early history ==
The 1st Newcastle Engineer Volunteers (EV) was raised at company strength in Newcastle upon Tyne during the enthusiasm for the Volunteer movement engendered by the invasion scare of 1859; its first officers' commissions were dated 1 September 1860. Many early volunteers came from Armstrong's engineering works at Elswick. The company was attached for administrative purposes to the 1st Newcastle upon Tyne Rifle Volunteer Corps.

In 1874, the Newcastle company was united with the larger (8 companies) 1st Durham EV at Jarrow on the opposite (County Durham) bank of the River Tyne. This unit had been raised and commanded by Charles Palmer (1822–1907), founder of Palmers Shipbuilding and Iron Company and later the first mayor and Member of Parliament for Jarrow. The two units were formed into the 1st Durham Administrative Battalion EV, consolidated in 1880 as the 1st Newcastle upon Tyne and Durham EV, with Palmer as commanding officer and an establishment of 1300 men.

Palmer, by now created Sir Charles Palmer, 1st Baronet of Grinkle Park, retired from the unit in 1888 with the rank of Colonel. The same year, the 1st Newcastle & Durham EV was split into three separate units: the 1st Newcastle upon Tyne RE (Volunteers), the 1st Durham RE (V), and the Tyne Division RE (V), Submarine Miners, which later became the Tyne Electrical Engineers. Both the 1st Newcastle RE (V) and the Tyne Submarine Miners derived their seniority from the original 1st Newcastle EV established in 1860.

The Lieutenant-Colonel Commandant of the new 1st Newcastle RE was Sir Charles Palmer's younger brother, Alfred Septimus Palmer (1834–1910), a Newcastle mining engineer who had been a major in the 1st Newcastle & Durham EV. The honorary Colonel was William Henry Allinson (1827–1917), who had been second-in-command of the 1st Newcastle & Durham.

The unit sent a detachment of one officer and 25 other ranks to assist the regular REs during the Second Boer War in 1900.

== Territorial Force ==
When the Volunteers were subsumed into the new Territorial Force (TF) under the Haldane Reforms of 1908, the original plan was for the 1st Newcastle RE to provide the 2nd Northumbrian Field Company in the Northumbrian Infantry Division while the remainder of the unit would be merged into the Tyne Electrical Engineers as the Northumberland (Fortress) RE. However, by 1910, this plan had been altered, and the 1st Newcastle RE provided the whole of the divisional RE, with its commanding officer becoming Commanding Royal Engineer (CRE). This organisation was in place on the outbreak of World War I:

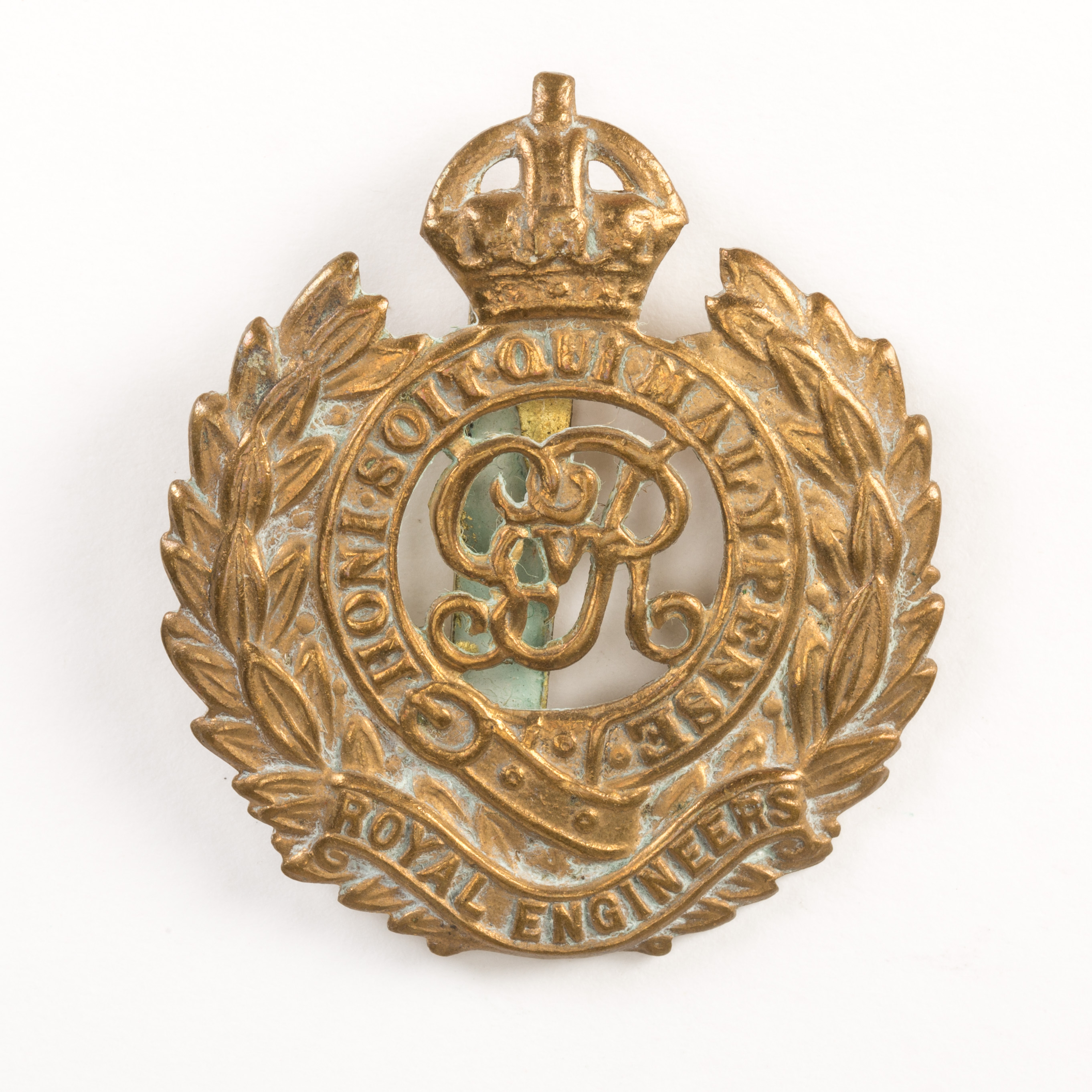
RE Cap badge (King George V cipher)

Northumbrian Divisional Engineers

- HQ: Barras Bridge, Newcastle
- CRE: Lt-Col Frederick S. Crawford (from 23 May 1907 to 16 April 1915)
- 1st (The Newcastle) Northumbrian Field Company (Maj G.C. Pollard)
- 2nd (The Newcastle) Northumbrian Field Company (Maj J.E. McPherson)
- Northumbrian (The Newcastle) Divisional Telegraph Company – designated Signal Company from 1911
  - HQ & No 1 Section: Barras Bridge (Capt W.H. Dodds)
  - No 2 (Northumberland) Section – attached to the Northumberland Brigade
  - No 3 (York and Durham) Section – attached to the York and Durham Brigade
  - No 4 (Durham Light Infantry) Section – attached to the Durham Light Infantry Brigade

== World War I ==
=== Mobilisation ===
On 3 August 1914, the men of the Northumbrian Division came home from their annual training camp. The next day the order to mobilise was received, and they returned to their drill halls. The mobilised division garrisoned the Tyne Defences as part of Central Force of Home Defence, and began training for war.

On 31 August, the TF was authorised to raise '2nd Line' units, initially for home defence, composed of men who had not volunteered for overseas service, together with new volunteers who were flooding in. Later, the home service men were transferred to home defence units, the 2nd Line were prepared for overseas service, and '3rd Line' units were organised to find drafts for the 1st and 2nd Lines. The units were distinguished by the prefixes '1/', '2/' and '3/', and the 2nd Line units of the Northumbrian Division formed the 2nd Northumbrian Division.

=== 28th Division ===
1/1st Northumbrian Field Company left the Northumbrian Division on 26 December 1914 to join 28th Division forming at Winchester. This was a formation of Regular infantry battalions returned from India, with engineers, signals and medical services provided by Territorial companies. The company disembarked at Le Havre on 19 January 1915 and served with 28th Division in France for the first half of the year, including the battles of Gravenstafel Ridge (22–23 April), St Julien (24 April–4 May), Frezenberg Ridge (8–13 May) and Bellewarde Ridge (24–25 May).

When 1/1st Northumbrian Field Company returned to the 1st Northumbrian Division, it was replaced by 2/1st Northumbrian Field Company from the 2nd Northumbrian Division, which joined 28th Division on 10 July 1915. For the remainder of the war 2/1st Company served with this division in France and Macedonia. In 1917 it was numbered 449th Field Company. It remained with 28th Division after the Armistice with Bulgaria (30 September 1918) and in November 1918 it moved to the Dardanelles with the division. During 1919 it served in Turkey with 28th Division.

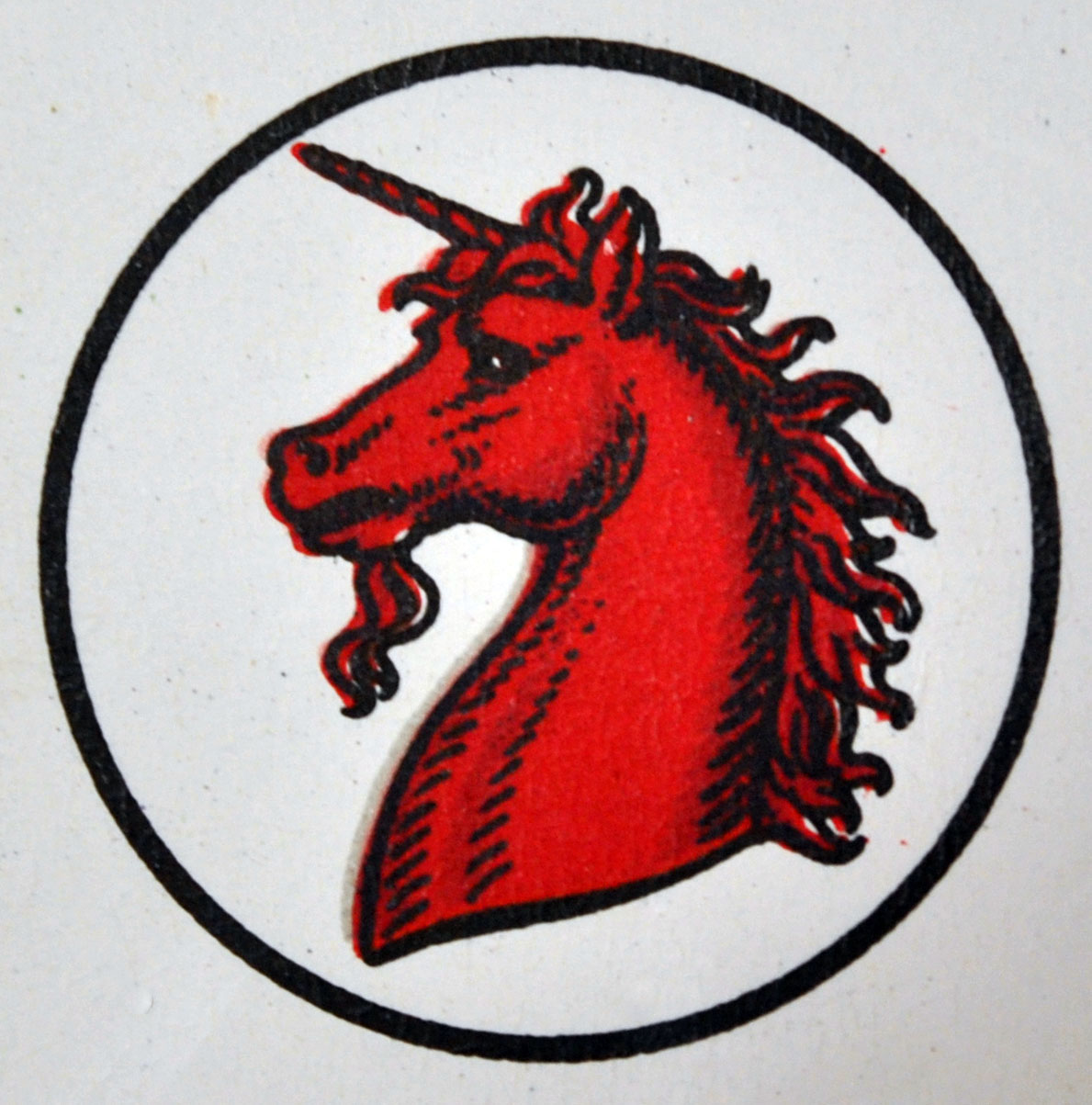
Formation sign of 50th (Northumbrian) Division in World War I.

=== 50th Division ===
Early in April 1915, the Northumbrian Division was informed that it would shortly be sent to France, and on 16 April it began to entrain for the ports of embarkation (Southampton and Folkestone). The division completed its concentration in the vicinity of Steenvoorde on 23 April. It was thrown into action the very next day at the Battle of St Julien, taking up positions along the Yser Canal and then counter-attacking. The infantry of the division were involved in bitter fighting. Meanwhile, the divisional engineers were left at Steenvorde, but from 26 April they were sent up each night to work on a new defence line near Hill 60, to which the division retired on the night of 2–3 May.

The Northumberland Division was now made responsible for holding a section of the line and learnt the techniques of trench warfare in which the engineers were kept busy improving defences. Like the 28th Division, the Northumberland Division also fought through the battles of Frezenberg Ridge and Bellewarde Ridge, and again at Bellewarde on 16 June. It was then moved south into quieter sectors for the rest of 1915.

Soon after arriving in France, the division received its number, becoming 50th (Northumbrian) Division, the brigades being numbered 149, 150 and 151, and the Signal Company numbered 50. 1/1st Northumbrian Field Company rejoined the division on 2 June 1915, and the divisional engineers were further reinforced on 17 June by 7th Field Company, RE, a Regular unit. 7th Field Company had landed in France with 4th Division on 22 August 1914, and had served through the Retreat from Mons, and the battles of the Marne, Aisne and Armentières. It had been attached to 48th (South Midland) Division for a few weeks before joining 50th Division.

1916
50th Division moved back into the Ypres Salient in December 1915. This meant more intense trench warfare, with the divisional engineers and signallers constantly engaged in repairing defences and communications. In August 1916, the division was transferred to the Somme sector, moving into the line at Bazentin-le-Petit by 10 September, where it immediately began digging assembly and jumping-off trenches for a new phase of the Battle of the Somme. This attack (the Battle of Flers–Courcelette) opened on 15 September, with 50th Division attacking between High Wood and Martinpiuch. 7th Field Company with part of the pioneer battalion set to repairing the road towards Martinpuich, while 1/1st and 1/2nd Northumrian Field Companies were held in reserve around Railway Trench. As the attack developed, by the afternoon of 15 September they were engaged in digging communication trenches, repairing roads and building gun emplacements under fire. This continued throughout the seven days of the battle, and casualties among the sappers were heavy.

The fighting was renewed on 25 September (the Battle of Morval) and 50th Division continued in action throughout October and into November (the battles of Le Transloy and Butte de Warlencourt). The division's last action on the Somme before being relieved was an attack on Gird Trench and Hook Sap on 14 November, which gained no ground. The division was withdrawn on the night of 17–18 November and went into Corps Reserve.

1917
' When the TF engineer companies were numbered on 3 February 1917, 1/1st Northumbrian became 446th (1st Northumbrian) and 1/2nd became 447th (2nd Northumbrian).

In mid-February, the division moved south to take over a section of the line from the French Army. The trenches were in poor condition, and had to be repaired by working parties directed by the field companies. In late March, the division moved north again, to take part in the Arras offensive. It consolidated ground captured in the First Battle of the Scarpe (9–14 April) and then attacked at the Second Battle of the Scarpe (23–24 April), when it suffered heavy losses. The engineers were engaged in road repair, clearing dugouts, digging and wiring trenches, and laying and repairing telephone lines, all under shellfire, and their casualties were numerous.

After a spell in Army Reserve, 50th Division returned to the line, and the summer of 1917 was spent in vigorous trench warfare, with constant patrols, raids, and constructing or repairing defences. It then moved to join the last phase of the Third Ypres Offensive, known as the Second Battle of Passchendaele. Because of the waterlogged nature of the ground, the German defences were based on concrete pillboxes and shell-holes rather than dugouts and trenches. 149th Brigade attacked on 26 October, with 446 Field Company in support. The attack was a failure and the attacking companies were virtually wiped out. Over succeeding days the rest of the division made small gains, at heavy cost. The division was relieved on 9 November.

1918
When the German spring offensive opened on 21 March 1918, 50th Division was in GHQ Reserve west of the Somme Canal, behind the Fifth Army front that was attacked. During the night the division was ordered up to occupy the rear line of defences known as the 'Green Line', where they came under attack the following day. The division held its positions, but the adjoining division fell back, and the bridges on 149 Brigade's flank had to be held by some of the engineers before they were demolished. The following day, the division was ordered to retreat behind the Somme Canal, and fell back over 10 miles, fighting rearguard actions.

On 24–25 March, the 50th Division defended the canal crossings, then as Fifth Army continued to retreat, it fell back again during the night of 25/26 March, taking part in the Battle of Rosières over the following two days. On the morning of 27 March, the CRE was ordered to form a composite infantry battalion from the 7th and 447th Field Companies and some details of 150th Brigade. The composite battalion took up a position to guard the flank of 149th Brigade but no enemy attack developed on that front. At 11.30, however, divisional HQ received a report that the enemy had broken through at Proyart, and the RE battalion was sent to cooperate with two battalions of the adjacent division (24th Division) in a counter-attack. This counter-attack was held up short of Proyart, but the existing trenches were held during the night and the following day, until the division withdrew towards Moreuil, where the German offensive was finally halted on 31 March.

50th Division was relieved on 1 April, and was sent north. It took over billets around Estaires on 8 April, just in time to be hit by the second phase of the German Spring Offensive (the Battle of the Lys) the following day, resulting in the Battle of Estaires. The front line held by the 40th Division and Portuguese 2nd Division collapsed, and after they had passed through, 50th Division defended a string of fortified farms and bridgeheads. The troops fought hard all day, and then retired over the rivers Lawe and Lys, destroying the bridges that night. The Germans took Estaires on 10 April, despite counter-attacks, and the division was pressed back through 11–12 April, fighting rearguard actions. The much-reduced division was relieved at dawn on 13 April.

After rest for the division and training for the replacement troops received, 50th Division moved south and relieved French troops in the River Aisne sector. Unfortunately, it was right in the path of the third phase of the German Spring Offensive (the Third Battle of the Aisne), which opened on 27 May. Several battalions were overrun, all the brigade commanders became casualties, and the division effectively ceased to exist by the end of the day. The Divisional Engineers had been sent up with the pioneers and reserves to occupy the Yellow (reserve) line, but were unable to reach it, meeting the advancing enemy before they reached the position. The remnants of the division were withdrawn two nights later.

The Northumbrian battalions of the 50th Division were reduced to cadres, training fresh US Army units, while the division was reconstituted with battalions brought back from the Macedonian front. The Divisional Engineers were among the few original parts that remained with the reconstituted division.

The rebuilt 50th Division re-entered the fighting during the Allied Advance to Victory, at the Battle of Beaurevoir (3–8 October). Considerable opposition was encountered. On 6 October, 150th Bde forced its way into the Beaurevoir Line, but subsequent attacks the following day by 149th Bde failed to progress. 7th Field Company then laid out the jumping-off tapes under cover of darkness and heavy rain, and 151st Bde broke through before dawn on 8 October.

After breaking the Beaurevoir Line, the BEF pursued the Germans to the River Selle, which had to be forced by a set-piece operation (the Battle of the Selle). There was only one sector where 50th Division could cross the river. The CRE, Lt-Col P. de H Hall, and the officers of 7th, 446th and 447th Field Companies reconnoitred the position and drew up plans to use 12 duckboard bridges and four floating bridges for the assault crossing. The bridges were made up with timber from a captured German dump and were concealed about 50 yards from the chosen site. The engineers began work at 01.00 on 17 October, cutting through hedges ahead of the infantry. When the artillery barrage came down at Zero Hour (05.20), the bridging parties (one RE officer and one pioneer officer, 17 sappers and 50 pioneers for each group of four bridges) advanced and assembled their bridges in ten minutes: 'all this, thanks to the thick mist, was done under the noses of the enemy without a casualty'. The division then crossed the river and embarked on bitter fighting for the 'Railway Triangle' on the outskirts of Le Cateau.

After a period in reserve, the division rejoined the offensive, forcing its way through the Forest of Mormal and across the River Sambre by plank bridges (4–5 November). The division continued the pursuit until it was relieved on 10 November, and the following day the Armistice with Germany came into force. Demobilisation began in December, and by March 1919 the division and its elements had been reduced to cadre and had gone home.

The following officers served as CRE of 50th (Northumbrian) Division:

- Col F.S. Crawford, 23 May 1907 – 16 April 1915
- Lt-Col J.E. McPherson (previously OC 2nd Northumbrian Field Company), from 16 April 1915
- Lt-Col C.W. Singer, 16 July 1915 – 23 December 1916, 25 March–4 April 1917
- Maj E.C. Henderson (temporary), 23 December 1916 – 25 March 1917
- Lt-Col H.E.F. Rathbone, 9 April 1917 – 5 February 1918
- Lt-Col J.A. McQueen (previously acting, 4–9 April 1917), 5 February–24 June 1918
- Lt-Col P.de H. Hall, from 30 July 1918

=== 63rd Division ===
2nd Northumbrian Division, numbered 63rd (2nd Northumbrian) Division from August 1915, was an exact duplicate of the 50th Division. It began to assemble in and around Newcastle in January 1915 as part of Northern Command. Its divisional RE comprised the 2/1st and 2/2nd Northumbrian Field Companies and the 2/1st Northumbrian Signal Company, all based at Newcastle.

The division was responsible for the Seaham Harbour–Sunderland–Newcastle coastal stretch in the defence of North East England. As early as January 1915, the 2nd Line units of the division began to be called upon to provide drafts to the 1st Line, and were rarely up to strength thereafter. 2/1st Northumbrian Field Company was replaced in 63rd Division by 3/1st, and when divisional RE establishments were increased to three field companies, a new 1/3rd was added by January 1916. The divisional signal company was numbered 63rd.

In November 1915, 63rd Division moved to Nottinghamshire, with the divisional RE at Worksop. At this period the division formed part of the Eighth New Army. But the drain of drafts to 50th Division fighting on the Western Front was so great that the division's infantry units were never up to strength. The decision was made in Spring 1916 to break up the division. The 63rd (2nd Northumbrian) Division ceased to exist on 21 July 1916. Its number (together with the divisional artillery) was transferred to the Royal Naval Division, but the divisional field companies were transferred to the 15th Indian Division, serving in Mesopotamia.

63rd (2/1st Northumbrian) Divisional Signal Company did not go overseas and was broken up for drafts in England.

The following officer served as CRE of 63rd (2nd Northumbrian) Division:

- Lt-Col J.E. McPherson (previously CRE, 50th Division), from 18 November 1915

=== 15th Indian Division ===
The division was formed on 7 May 1916 in Mesopotamia, and had already seen action. The Northumbrian engineers joined the division on the Euphrates front as follows:

- 2/2nd Northumbrian Field Company, joined on 1 December 1916, numbered 448th (Northumbrian) Field Company on 6 March 1917
- 3/1st Northumbrian Field Company, joined on 10 March 1917, numbered 450th (Northumbrian) Field Company on 6 March
- 1/3rd Northumbrian Field Company, joined on 10 January 1917, numbered 451st (Northumbrian) Field Company on 6 March

The division took part in the Capture of Ramadi on 28–9 September 1917, the occupation of Hit on 9 March 1918, and the action of Khan Baghdadi on 26–7 March 1918.

At the end of the war the division was rapidly run down, and was formally disbanded in March 1919.

The following officers served as CRE of 15th Indian Division while the Northumbrian companies were attached:

- Lt-Col C.B.L. Greenstreet, 28 October 1916 – 7 February 1917
- Lt-Col J.F. Turner, from 7 February 1917

=== 641st (Northumbrian) Field Company ===
In May 1915, all TF men who had only signed up for Home Service were transferred to Home Defence brigades (termed Provisional Brigades). 2nd Provisional Brigade was formed in North East England from the home service men of 50th (Northumbrian) and 49th (West Riding) Divisions, including 2nd Provisional Field Company, RE. By March 1916, the Provisional Brigades were concentrated along the South East Coast of England. The Military Service Act 1916 swept away the Home/Foreign service distinction, and all TF soldiers became liable for overseas service, if medically fit. The provisional brigades and units received numbers and henceforth part of their role was physical conditioning to render men fit for drafting overseas. 2nd Provisional Brigade became the 222nd Infantry Brigade, and in March 1917 the field company was redesignated 641st (Northumbrian) Field Company. The unit never served overseas but lasted until at least August 1917.

454th (Northumbrian) Reserve Field Company was also formed (probably from 2nd or 3rd Line Territorials) and existed from January to December 1917. Little is known about it, but it did not proceed overseas, and was probably absorbed into the central training organisation in 1918.

== Interwar ==
The 50th (Northumbrian) Infantry Division reformed in April 1920 in what was now termed the Territorial Army, with its engineers organised as follows:
50th (Northumbrian) Divisional Engineers, RE

- 232nd (Northumbrian) Field Company
- 233rd (Northumbrian) Field Company
- 234th (Northumbrian) Field Company

Signals units were transferred from the RE to the newly formed Royal Corps of Signals in 1920: 50th Divisional Signals at Gateshead absorbed 5th (Cyclist) Battalion, East Yorkshire Regiment and moved to Hull. Later, each division was assigned a 'Field Park Company', which acted as a base for the field companies and held specialist equipment, including the divisional bridging platoon. 50th Division's Field Park Company was numbered 235 in sequence after the field companies.

After the Munich Crisis in 1938 the TA was doubled in size, with most existing units and formations creating duplicates. 232–235 Companies of 50th (Northumbrian) Divisional Engineers were duplicated by 505–508 Companies, but instead of the new units being assigned to the new 2nd Line division (23rd (Northumbrian) Division), they were mixed, as follows:

50th (Northumbrian) Divisional Engineers, RE

- 232nd (Northumbrian) Field Company
- 505th Field Company
- 235th (Northumbrian) Field Park Company

23rd (Northumbrian) Divisional Engineers, RE

- 233rd (Northumbrian) Field Company
- 507th Field Company
- 508th Field Park Company

Northern Command

- 234th (Northumbrian) Field Company at Gateshead
- 506th Field Company at Newcastle

== World War II ==
=== Battle of France ===
Formation sign of the 50th (Northumbrian) Division in World War II.

==== 50th Division ====
The 50th Division joined the British Expeditionary Force (BEF) in France in February 1940. When the Germans attacked in May, the division moved up into Belgium with the rest of the BEF and took up positions on the River Dendre. However, the Germans broke through French lines and the BEF was forced to retreat. By 19 May, 50th Division was moved back to Vimy Ridge north of Arras to prepare for a counter-attack as part of 'Frankforce.'

On 21 May, part of the division attacked, supported by tanks, in what became known as the Battle of Arras. However, after this brief check, the Germans continued to advance, and Arras became a dangerous salient and a further attack was cancelled. By now the BEF was cut off from the bulk of the French armies, and began its retreat towards Dunkirk. 50th Division was sent north to Ypres, where it found an open flank where the Belgians had already retreated. It began a planned withdrawal, providing a rearguard for the eastern flank of the BEF, suffering heavy casualties from bombardment as it did so. By the night of 31 May–1 June the division was back across the French frontier, in reserve to the French defenders. The division, less its heavy equipment, was evacuated from Dunkirk on 1 June and landed in the United Kingdom the following day.

==== 23rd Division ====
23rd (Northumbrian) Division only became operational on 2 October 1939, and almost immediately, 506 Field Company was withdrawn to join the reforming 5th Infantry Division and then 2nd Infantry Division, which it served throughout the war. Partly trained, 23rd Division was sent to France in an incomplete state primarily to provide labour behind the lines, but after the German breakthrough it was ordered up to defend a frontage of 16 miles along the Canal du Nord. Outflanked, and faced with five German Panzer divisions, the infantry and engineers fell back towards Arras, doing what they could to hold up the enemy and suffering heavy casualties in the process. The division played a peripheral part in the Battle of Arras and by 27 May had retreated into the Dunkirk perimeter, by which time it was incapable of further action.

After evacuation from Dunkirk, 23rd Division was broken up. 233 Field Company rejoined 50th Division, while 507 Field Company and 508 Field Park Company transferred to London Defence Troops RE. 507 Field Company later went to Northern Ireland with 148 Brigade Group until mid-1942, when it joined 47th (London) Infantry Division, a reserve formation, with which it remained until the end of the war. 508 Field Park Company was assigned to VIII Corps Troops, Royal Engineers by February 1941 and apart from a brief interval it served with that unit in home defence and throughout the campaign in North West Europe.

=== North Africa ===
After re-equipping and retraining in the United Kingdom, 50th Division sailed on 23 April 1941 for Egypt. Following spells in Cyprus, Iraq and Syria, it joined British Eighth Army for the Battle of Gazala (26 May–21 June 1942). 150th Brigade, with 232 Field Company under command, had formed an independent brigade group and had been in the Western Desert since the previous November. It rejoined the division in February 1942, but during the 'Battle of the Cauldron' at Gazala the whole brigade, including 232 Field Company, was captured on 1 June and never reformed.

235 Field Park Company also disappeared from the division's order of battle on the same day, being temporarily replaced by 142 Field Park Squadron from 1st Armoured Brigade, but returned in September.

For the battles of Mersa Matruh and Alamein and for the remainder of the North African Campaign, the division operated with just its two surviving field companies (233 and 505) and field park (295). After Mersah Matruh, they were engaged in developing a reserve position behind the main defence line at El Alamein. During the pursuit to Tripoli after the battle they were kept busy repairing roads demolished by the retreating enemy. They also suffered casualties while clearing mines.

50th Division moved up from Tripoli to lead the attack at the Battle of Mareth on 20 March 1943. The enemy position was behind the Wadi Zigzaou, 200 feet (61 m) wide, with almost unclimbable sides 20 feet (6.1 m) high. The divisional engineers under their CRE, Lt-Col C.E.A. Browning, made quantities of fascines and scaling ladders, with which they and the infantry advanced 'as though at the storm of Badajoz', according to the RE's historian. The infantry stormed three or four strongpoints and formed a bridgehead. Under accurately ranged shellfire and enfiladed by machine guns, the sappers began to build fascine causeways for tanks and vehicles. Casualties were extremely heavy, but they managed to complete one causeway for tracked vehicles. They were unable to improve it for wheeled vehicles, and the first light tanks to cross it caused such damage in the mud that the heavier tanks could not follow. On the night of 21/22 March, heavy rain produced a spate in the Wadi that further damaged the crossing. The 'shattered and weary' 50th Divisional RE were reinforced by Sappers and Miners from 4th Indian Division, and started work in the evening of 22 March on two new causeways, while the enemy were counter-attacking: the wadi was under heavy close-range fire and the rising moon silhouetted the men working on the far bank. The causeways were completed at 03.30 on 23 March under a heavy barrage preceding another enemy counter-attack. The sappers then withdrew without hurrying, so as not to alarm the defending infantry. 50th Division was also in the forefront of the attack on Wadi Akarit on 6 April, when the divisional engineers had the task of clearing gaps in the minefields and making crossings over the anti-tank ditch.

=== Sicily ===
In April 1943, in preparation for the invasion of Sicily (Operation Husky), 50 Division was joined by 168 (London) Infantry Brigade (consisting of 1st London Scottish, 1st London Irish Rifles and 10th Royal Berkshire Regiment) from 56th (London) Infantry Division, which brought 501 Field Company with it, which was soon replaced with 295th Fd Co, another London unit. The 50th Infantry Division was in the first assault wave and then fought its way up the east side of the island, including the Battle of Primosole Bridge.

After the fighting was over in Sicily, 168 (London) Brigade was replaced by 231 Independent Infantry Brigade (2nd Devonshire Regiment, 1st Dorset Regiment and 1st Hampshire Regiment), together with 295 Field Company, a Territorial Army unit originally recruited in London. These had fought through the Sicilian campaign and the assault landing in Italy in September. They now became permanent parts of the 50th (Northumbrian) Division. The divisional bridging platoon became an independent unit (as 15 Bridging Platoon) within the Divisional RE in August.

With its experience of amphibious assaults, 50th Division was earmarked for the forthcoming invasion of Normandy (Operation Overlord) and sailed for Britain in October 1943.

=== North-West Europe ===
On D-Day, 6 June 1944, 50th Division carried out the landings on Gold Beach. For this it was heavily reinforced, including two squadrons (81 and 82) of 6th Assault Regiment RE from 79th Armoured Division equipped with AVREs, and two additional field companies RE (73 and 280) carrying explosives to deal with beach obstacles. These troops were the first to reach the beach and begin work under fire before the assault infantry arrived. The division's own 235 Field Park Company formed specialist detachments, driving bulldozers etc. Once off the beach, 50th Division pushed inland towards Bayeux, and then consolidated its gains over the next few days against German counter-attacks. Progress towards Villers-Bocage was held up by strong Panzer units.

For the next two months, the division fought its way slowly through the Bocage country before being relieved on 5 August. However, it was back in action on 9 August, attacking against stiff opposition in the advance beyond Mont Pincon as the Allies closed the Falaise Gap. Once the Seine was crossed and the pursuit began, 50th Division supported 11th Armoured Division's rapid advance, protecting the flank and 'mopping up' local resistance. On 1 September the division secured bridges over the River Somme near Amiens and reached Arras. On 3 September, it took part in the Liberation of Brussels.

More resistance was met at the Albert Canal, and 50th Division had to make an assault crossing in storm boats, after which the engineers erected (and maintained under heavy fire) a folding bridge, while the infantry pushed on and captured Gheel after bitter fighting. (7–11 September). The division was due to play a minor role in Operation Market Garden, holding the bridgehead from which Guards Armoured Division advanced, and later defending the road and bridge at Nijmegen, but the latter turned into a major defensive battle after the defeat at Arnhem. Again, damage to the bridges had to be made good by the engineers.

The defence of the Nijmegen bridgehead was 50th Division's last operation. It was by now very weak, and in December 1944 it was broken up to provide replacements for other units in 21st Army Group. Most of the division's units returned to the United Kingdom as training cadres to turn surplus Royal Navy and Royal Air Force personnel into infantry. However, the Divisional RE continued its frontline engineering role, the four companies becoming 50th GHQ Troops RE within 21st Army Group until the end of the war in Europe.

=== 50th GHQ Troops RE ===
For the assault crossing of the Rhine (Operation Plunder) 50th GHQTRE's field companies constructed a vital access road, dubbed 'Caledonian Road', along the river bank to allow amphibious Buffalos and trucks carrying rafting equipment to cross a flooded area to reach the bank. The stores for the first 800 yards (730 m) of this road were brought forward, dumped, and camouflaged during the night of 22/23 March. At dusk the following evening, as the assault crossing began, the field companies started work and although hampered by enemy fire (the RE and Pioneers assisting them suffered over 50 casualties) they completed their 800 yards before dawn, when fire from Rees across the river halted further work. After the town was subdued the road was completed to its full length. At first it was made from channel tracks, which were later covered with soil so that carriers could run over them. But rain on 26 March turned this into slippery mud and the soil had to be scraped off again and replaced with coir matting and Sommerfeld tracking.

== Postwar ==
When the TA was reconstituted in 1947, 50th Divisional RE was reformed as 103 Field Engineer Regiment, RE, with 232, 505 and 506 Companies and 235 Park Company now designated as squadrons. When the division was reorganised as a division/district command in 1961, 103 Regiment was broken up and 505 Fd Sqn was disbanded, but 232 and 506 Fd Sqns and 235 Fd Park Sqn continued to be assigned to the divisional HQ. A major reorganisation in 1967 saw the division/district disbanded, and its RE component reformed as HQ Squadron and 103 (1st Newcastle) Field Squadron of 72 Engineer Regiment. The remainder of 72 Engineer Regiment was formed by the lineal descendants of the Tyne Electrical Engineers, thus uniting the lineages of all the Newcastle and Durham Engineer Volunteers of 1860 and 1874).

72 Engineer Regiment was reduced to a single squadron in 1999 but reformed in 2006 as 72 (Tyne Electrical Engineers) Engineer Regiment (V), as a Close Support RE regiment, with the following organisation:

- 103 (1st Newcastle) Field Squadron at Newcastle and Sunderland
- 106 Field Squadron at Sheffield and Bradford
- 299 Parachute Squadron at Wakefield and Hull

72 Engineer Regiment supported 21 and 23 (Air Assault) Engineer Regiments of the Regular RE.

Under the Future of the British Army (Army 2020) plans, 72 Engineer Regiment was withdrawn from the Army's order of battle by December 2016, but 103 Field Squadron, based in Tyneside, continued after being resubordinated to 21 Engineer Regiment as part of a hybrid Regular and Reserve Unit.

In November 2017, 103 Field Squadron was resubordinated from 21 Engineer Regiment in Ripon to 71 Engineer Regiment, based out of RAF Leuchars. 103 Field Squadron continues to operate as a detached Squadron from the Army Reserve Centre in Debdon Gardens, Newcastle.

== Memorials ==
A World War I memorial to the men of the Durham Fortress Engineers and its three field companies was unveiled in Jarrow Drill Hall in 1928. An additional inscription to 233rd Field Company (of the Northumbrian Divisional Engineers) was added after World War II. The memorial is now in the RE Army Reserve Centre at Debdon Gardens, Newcastle.

== External sources ==
- British Army units from 1945 on
- Great War Forum
- The Long, Long Trail
- Family Tree at Eric Palmer's Home Page
- Orders of Battle at Patriot Files
- The Regimental Warpath 1914–1918 (archive site)
- RE Museum
- The Thompsons, Shipbuilders of Sunderland
- North East War Memorials Project
