= 103 (Tyne Electrical Engineers) Field Squadron =

72nd (Tyne Electrical Engineers) Engineer Regiment 106 (Tyne Electrical Engineers) Field Squadron
- Active: 1967—1992; 1993—1999; 2006—Present
- Country: United Kingdom
- Branch: British Army: Corps of Royal Engineers
- Type: Engineers
- Role: Military Engineering
- Size: Squadron
- Part of: 71st Engineer Regiment (V)
- Garrison/HQ: Gateshead

The 72nd (Tyne Electrical Engineers) Engineer Regiment was a territorial regiment of the Royal Engineers, British Army, for three periods between 1967 and 2014. The regiment was later reduced to squadron size and renamed as 103 (Tyne Electrical Engineers) Field Squadron within 71 Engineer Regiment.

== History ==
=== 72nd Engineer Regiment ===
The 72nd Engineer Regiment was formed when the Territorial Army was re-organised in the 1960s. It was created from the 50th (Northumbrian) Infantry Division's engineer regiment and some other separate squadrons. Its first and only headquarters were at Gateshead. From 1967 - 1992 it was assigned to the 29th Engineer Brigade. Both 103 and 188 Squadrons were assigned to the "Harrier Support Group" from 1972 - 1982. In 1999 the regiment was disbanded but one squadron remained 72 (Tyne Electrical Engineers) Air Support Field Squadron which was a reserve air support squadron within the 71st Engineer Regiment. In 2006 the regiment was reformed and 72 Squadron became the new headquarters squadron. Under Army 2020 the regiment will disband but the squadrons will be reassigned to other regiments.

During its time, the regiment had the following structure;

- Regimental Headquarters, Gateshead
  - Regimental Pipes and Drums of the Tyne Electrical Engineers (moved to 102 Battalion REME and later disbanded)
- 103 (Tyne Electrical Engineers) Field Squadron, Newcastle upon Tyne (moved to 21 Engineer Regiment)
  - 2 Troop, Sunderland
- 106 (West Riding) Field Squadron, Sheffield (moved to 32 Engineer Regiment)
  - Troop, Bradford
- 299 Parachute Squadron, Wakefield (moved to 23 Parachute Engineer Regiment)
  - 1 Troop, Hull
  - 3 Troop, Gateshead

=== 72 and 103 (TEE) Field Squadron ===
Under the Army 2020 refine, 72 Engineer Regiment was disbanded with most of its units being re-designated and moving to other regiments. Part of the changes was the renaming of 72 (Tyne Electrical Engineers) Air Support Field Squadron to become 103 (Tyne Electrical Engineers) Field Squadron. Another change was the moving under control of 21st Engineer Regiment. Following this change, the squadron is now the reserve squadron of the regiment, supporting the 1st Strike Brigade. The squadron currently maintains 2 Troop in Sunderland, while the rest of the squadron is based in Heaton. Following the Field Army changes on 1 August 2019, the squadron was moved from the 21st Engineer Regiment to 71st Engineer Regiment (V) headquartered at Leuchars Station.
