= Cecil William Haydon =

Brigadier Cecil William Haydon DSO MC
- Born: 23 February 1896; Newton Abbot, Devon, England
- Died: 1 June 1942 (aged 46)
- Burial place: Alamein Memorial, El Alamein, Egypt
- Military career
- Allegiance: United Kingdom
- Branch: British Army
- Service years: 1914–1942
- Rank: Brigadier
- Service number: 5985
- Unit: Middlesex Regiment
- Commands: 2nd Battalion, Middlesex Regiment; 150th Infantry Brigade
- Conflicts: World War I Irish War of Independence; World War II †
- Awards: Distinguished Service Order; Military Cross; Mentioned in dispatches

Brigadier Cecil William Haydon DSO MC (23 February 1896 − 1 June 1942) was a British Army officer who served in both World War I and World War II. He was killed in action while commanding the 150th Infantry Brigade during the North African campaign in mid-1942.

== Early life ==
Cecil William Haydon was born in Newton Abbot, Devon on 23 February 1896, the son of Edgar and Edith Haydon. He was educated at the Imperial Service College and was commissioned into the Middlesex Regiment, a line infantry regiment of the British Army, on 1 October 1914, shortly after the outbreak of World War I.

== World War I ==
Haydon served on the Western Front, where he was twice wounded in action. He served as a General Staff Officer Grade 3 (GSO3) from November 1917 to May 1918 and then, from May 1918 until April 1919, as a brigade major with the 167th (1st London) Brigade, part of the 56th (1st London) Division. He was awarded the Military Cross (MC) in November 1918. The citation for Haydon's MC reads:

For conspicuous gallantry and devotion to duty. He carried out two valuable reconnaissances, obtained important information, and succeeded in clearing up a very obscure situation. His skilful work was of great value at a time when information was urgently required.

== Postwar period ==
With the war over in November 1918 due to the armistice, Haydon remained in the army in the immediate aftermath of the war and throughout the difficult interwar period. After relinquishing his post as brigade major of the 167th Brigade, he was then made a GSO3 while serving with the British Army of the Rhine (BAOR) and then again a brigade major to a brigade serving with the BAOR. In 1919, he was mentioned in dispatches for his service during World War I. From August 1920 until January 1922 he served, yet again as a brigade major, in Irish Command during the Anglo-Irish War.

In 1931 Haydon served briefly with the 1st Battalion of his regiment before being employed with the Royal West African Frontier Force, a position he held for six years, from June 1931 until June 1937. While he was serving with them he received several promotions, to the local rank of major, which he held from 12 September 1931 until 17 January 1936, to the permanent rank of major on 11 October 1937, and the local rank of lieutenant colonel on 18 January 1936. He was promoted to the brevet rank of lieutenant colonel on 1 July 1939. In January 1939 he returned to the Middlesex Regiment, this time the 2nd Battalion, then stationed in Gosport, Hampshire, serving with them for the next few months until he succeeded Gerard Bucknall as the battalion's commanding officer (CO) just before the beginning of World War II in September, receiving a promotion to the acting rank of lieutenant colonel in the process.

== World War II ==
Haydon commanded the 2nd Battalion for the next seven months, during which time it crossed over to France as part of the British Expeditionary Force (BEF). In late April 1940 he gave up command of the battalion, which eventually went to Brian Horrocks, to assume command of the 150th Infantry Brigade, part of the 50th (Northumbrian) Infantry Division, which soon fought in the Battle of France, followed by the retreat to Dunkirk and the subsequent Dunkirk evacuation, from where the majority of the BEF was returned to the United Kingdom, although a significant amount of equipment was left behind. Haydon was, however, rewarded with the Distinguished Service Order (DSO), "for gallant and distinguished services in action in connection with recent operations", for the brief campaign in France and Belgium.

Remaining in command of the brigade, Haydon oversaw it in its anti-invasion duties against an expected German invasion of the United Kingdom, although this never materialized. Sent overseas to the Mediterranean theatre with the rest of the 50th Division in the first half of 1941, the brigade did not see action until mid-1942 during the Battle of Gazala, where Haydon was killed in action on 1 June 1942, aged 46. His name is commemorated at the Alamein Memorial.
