= Milldam Barracks =

Former military installation at Hampshire

- Portsmouth
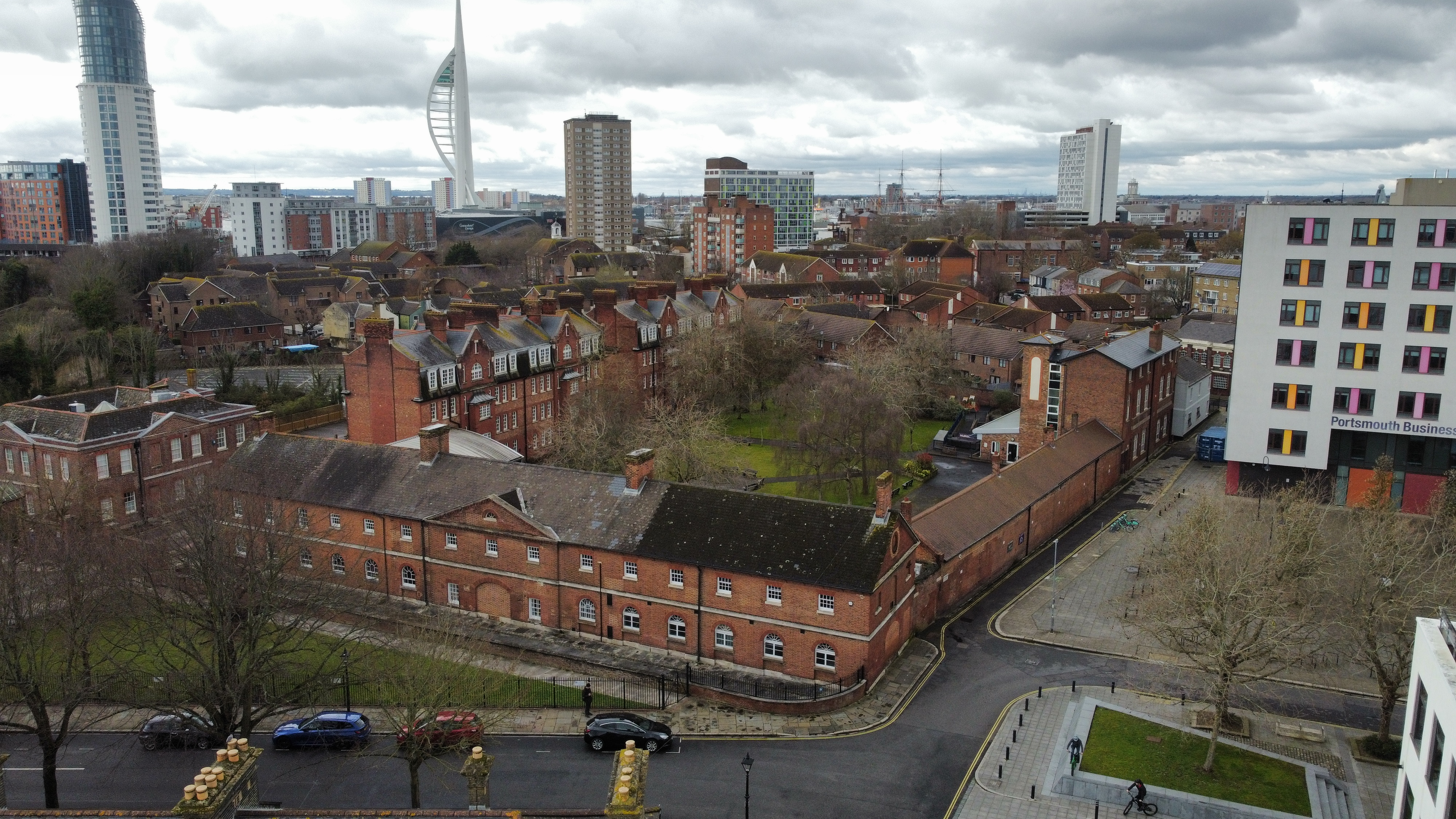
- The former Milldam Barracks, viewed from the east.

Site information
- Type: Barracks

Location
- Location within Hampshire
- Coordinates: 50.79693°N 1.09954°W

Site history
- Built: c. 1800
- Built for: Board of Ordnance
- In use: c.1800-1969

Garrison information
- Garrison: Portsmouth Garrison
- Occupants: Corps of Royal Engineers

Milldam Barracks is a former military installation at Portsmouth, Hampshire. The complex includes two Grade II listed buildings.

== History ==
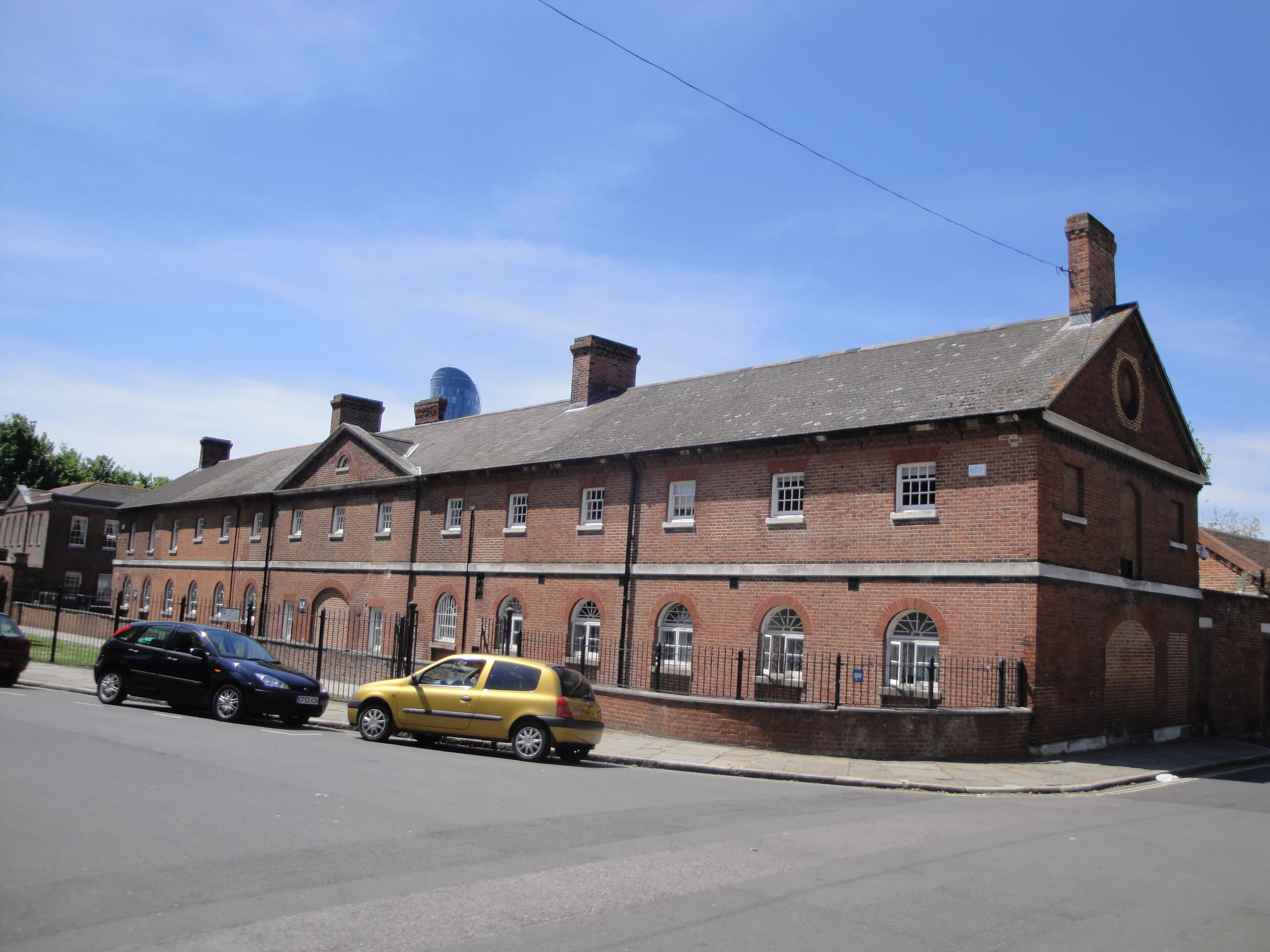
Milldam Barracks: the oldest part of the complex, dating from c. 1800.

Milldam here refers to a mill pond which used to extend across a large area, 'many acres in extent', between Old Portsmouth and Portsea. It was used to drive a tidal mill, of medieval origin, which was rebuilt by one Thomas Beeston after 1574 and sold to the Crown in the early 1700s (after which it was known as the King's Mill). Standing within the fortifications and protected by its own 'Mill Redoubt' it produced flour for the Victualling Commissioners of the Royal Navy. When the Gunwharf was built, the mill and a channel to the mill pond was preserved within it.

Not long after 1800 the mill pond was reconfigured and reduced in area, and a large brick building (pictured) was built on part of the reclaimed ground. It served as offices (and adjoining stores) for the Royal Engineer department of the Garrison, which at the time was responsible for all building works and for upkeep of the fortifications. (Barrack accommodation at this time was provided separately, at Landport.) In 1834 the decision was taken to put future garrison engineering works out to contract: the local detachment of Sappers and Miners departed, their barracks at Landport were sold and the store buildings at Milldam were let. A small staff of just 'one or two officers and foremen of work' were retained, however, to superintend the work of the contractors.

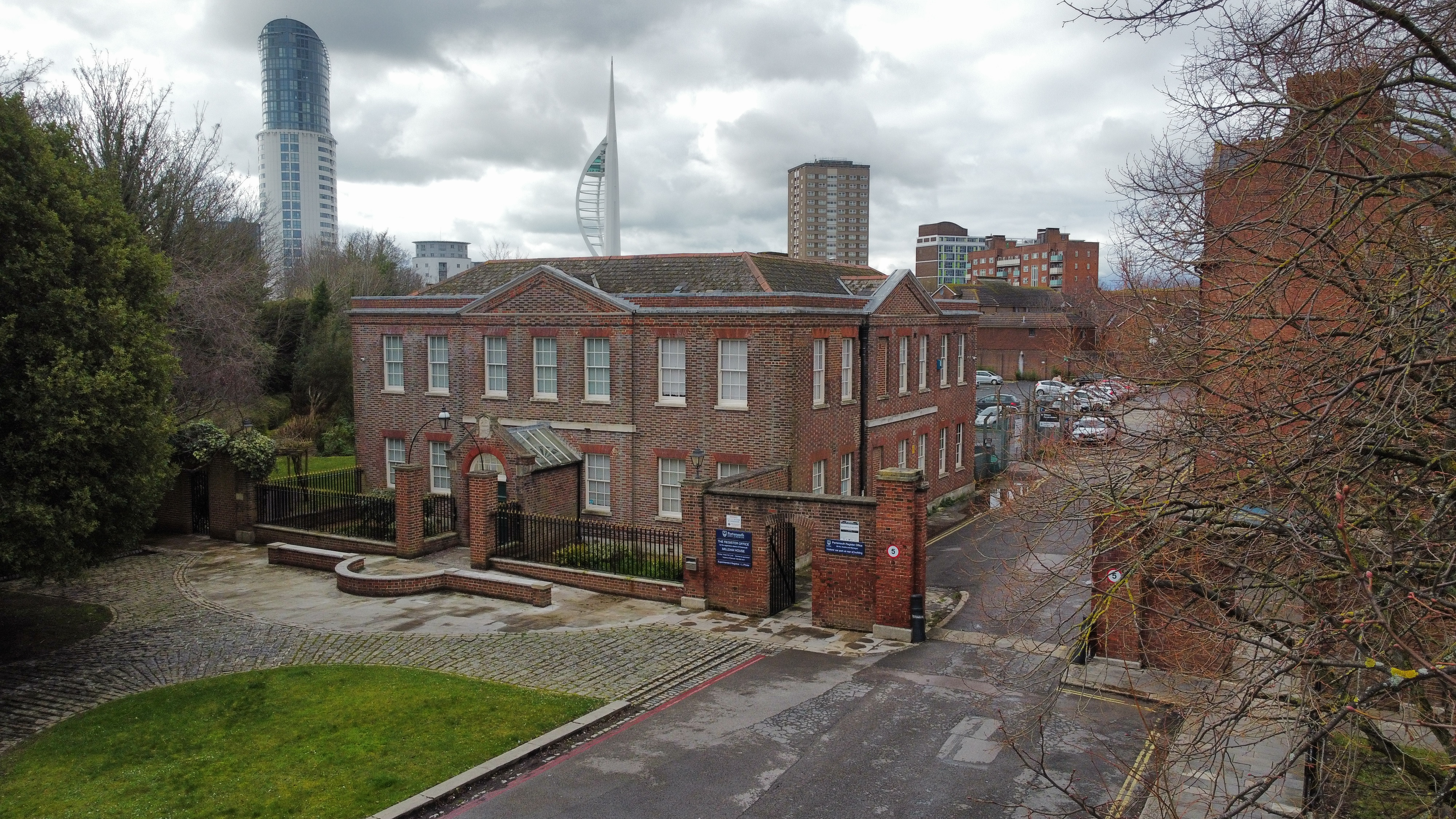
The main gate and former offices of 1846 (Milldam House).

The neighbouring building (now known as Milldam House) was built in 1846 to serve as the Royal Engineers' Office (as inscribed on a stone shield above the front door). The Commanding Royal Engineer, Portsmouth was based here, and the complex as a whole was described at the time as 'the offices and workshops of the Ordnance department, to which belongs the superintendence and repair of all castles, forts and fortifications in the south-west district of England'.

By 1865 soldiers' quarters had been added to the site, which also contained a variety of workshops, stores and other amenities arranged around two open spaces. The King's Mill burned down in 1868, after which the mill pond was filled in; the recovered land went on to serve as a Recreation Ground for the non-commissioned officers and men of the garrison (and for the officers, who were provided with a cricket ground on part of the site).

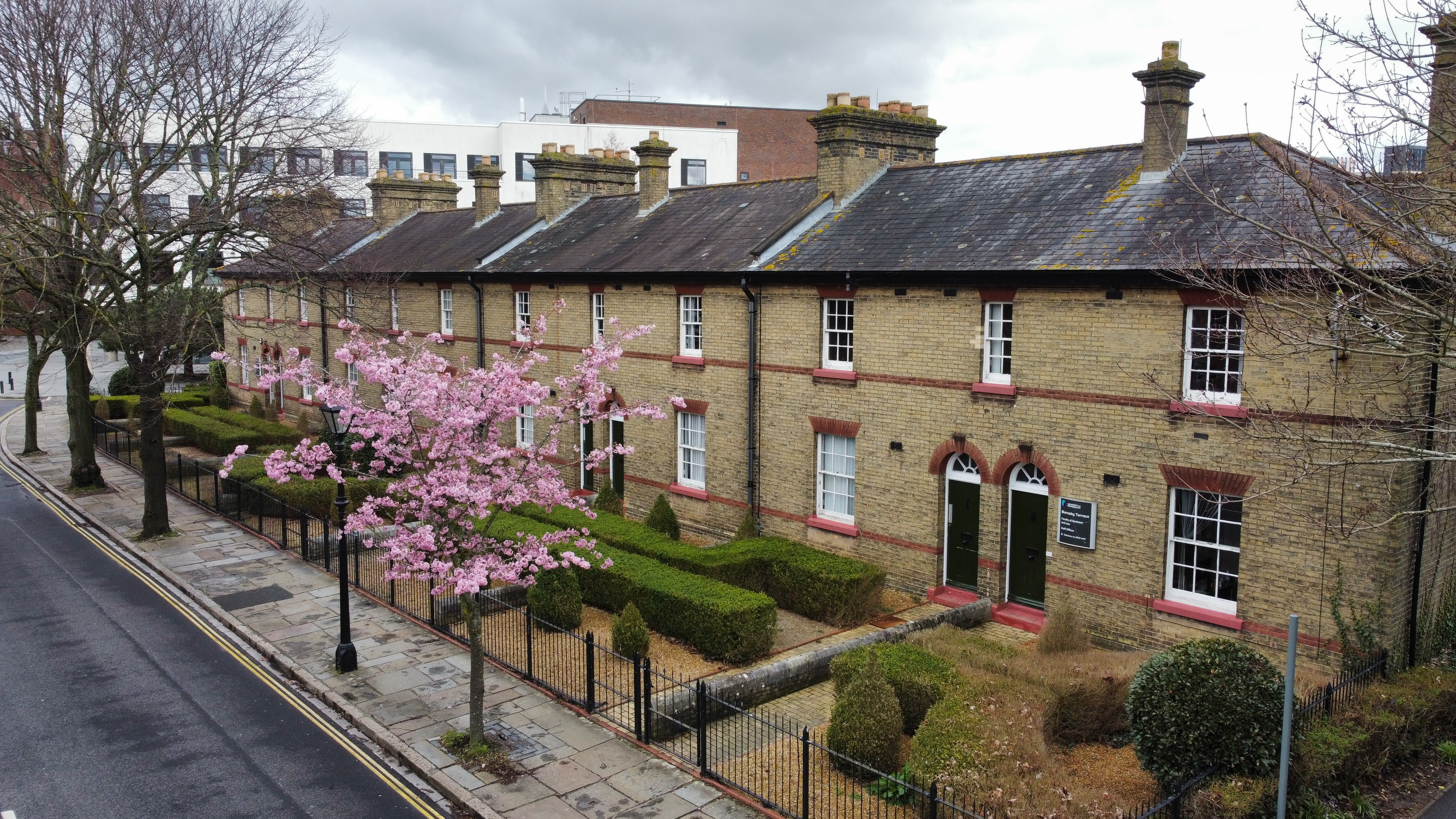
Burnaby Terrace, former married quarters (1917) across the road from the barracks.

During the First World War the Tyne Electrical Engineers telephone section, based at Milldam Barracks, became responsible for the entire military telephone system for the Southern Coast Defences, including Portsmouth, Southampton and the Isle of Wight. The skills of the former submarine miners were employed when a cable linking the sea forts had to be repaired. A set of sixteen Married Soldiers' Quarters were added to the site in 1917. The barracks continued to be the base of the Commanding Royal Engineer, Wessex Area (East) during the inter-war period. After the Second World War the barracks continued to be home to technical units such as the Weapons Systems Tuning Group.

The barracks complex eventually became surplus to requirements and it was decommissioned in 1969. In 1976-7 most of the buildings were acquired by Portsmouth Polytechnic and today they house the School of Social and Historical Studies of the University of Portsmouth. Milldam House, on the other hand, was acquired by Portsmouth City Council and serves as the Portsmouth Register Office.

== Sources ==
- Short, Major O.M., Sherlock, Major H., Perowne, Captain L.E.C.M., and Fraser, Lieutenant M.A., (1933) The History of the Tyne Electrical Engineers, Royal Engineers, 1884–1933, ISBN 1-84574-796-8.
