= 150th Infantry Brigade (United Kingdom) =

Infantry formation of British Army during World War II

- Active: 1939–1942
- Country: United Kingdom
- Branch: British Army
- Type: Infantry
- Size: Brigade
- Part of: 50th (Northumbrian) Infantry Division
- Engagements: Battle of France (1940); Battle of Gazala

The 150th Infantry Brigade was an infantry formation of the British Army that saw active service in the Second World War. A 1st Line Territorial Army brigade, it was part of the 50th (Northumbrian) Infantry Division. It served in the Battle of France and was evacuated from Dunkirk. Later it served in the Middle East and was overrun and forced to surrender during the Battle of Gazala in the North African Campaign. For almost 72 hours (29–31 May 1942) during the battle the 150th Brigade and the 44th Royal Tank Regiment held out against Erwin Rommel's concentrated attacks, without any support. On 1 June the German Army finally forced their surrender. The brigade was not reformed.

== Order of battle ==
The following units constituted the 150th Brigade:

- 4th Battalion, East Yorkshire Regiment
- 4th Battalion, Green Howards
- 5th Battalion, Green Howards
- 150th Infantry Brigade Anti-Tank Company – 8 December 1939 to 1 January 1941

== Battle of France ==
50th (Northumbrian) Division was mobilised on the outbreak of war in September 1939. After training it travelled to France in January 1940 to join the new British Expeditionary Force (BEF).

The Battle of France began on 10 May with the German invasion of the Low Countries. The BEF followed the pre-arranged Plan D and advanced into Belgium to take up defences along the River Dyle. 50th (N) Division was in reserve for the divisions along the Dyle line by 15 May. However, the German Army had broken through the Ardennes to the east, forcing the BEF to withdraw again across a series of river lines. By the end of 19 May the whole force was back across the Escaut, with 50th (N) Division concentrating on Vimy Ridge above Arras and preparing to make a counter-attack on the German forces sweeping past towards the sea. The attack (the Battle of Arras) was made on 21 May, but 150th Bde was not involved, being sent to strengthen the garrison of Arras and to hold the line of the River Scarpe. It carried out a raid across the river during the day. As the Germans continued to move west, behind the BEF, Arras was becoming a dangerous salient, and 150th Bde came under attack on 23 May. It fought its way out of Arras via Douai that night as the BEF scrambled to form a defensive ring round Dunkirk. 50th (N) Division was then thrown into a gap left near Ypres when the Belgian Army surrendered. By now the decision had been made to evacuate the BEF through Dunkirk (Operation Dynamo), and 50th (N) Division held the line to allow this to proceed. All day on 29 May it was bombarded as it pulled back, still in contact with the enemy. The rest of II Corps was evacuated on the night of 31 May/1 June, while 50th (N) Division continued to hold the line. Finally, 150th Bde's turn came, and it was evacuated to England on 2 June.

50th (N) Division spent almost a year re-equipping and training in the UK, taking its place in the anti-invasion defences, before it was chosen for renewed overseas service.

== North Africa ==
50th (N) Division sailed to reinforce Middle East Forces on 23 April 1941, landing in Egypt on 13 June. It was then sent to garrison Cyprus, but 150th Bde was detached to Western Desert Force (WDF). However, the WDF's Operation Battleaxe had failed, 150th Bde was not immediately required, and in August it rejoined 50th (N) Division in Cyprus. In November the division moved by sea and road to Iraq, but once again 150th Bde was detached to Egypt as an independent brigade group, arriving on 29 November and joining Eighth Army on 22 December.

While operating as an independent brigade group it included the following additional units:

- 72nd (Northumbrian) Field Regiment, Royal Artillery
- 232nd (Northumbrian) Field Company, Royal Engineers
- 50th Recce Battalion – until 22 December 1941
- 'B' Company, Royal Army Service Corps
- Sections, Royal Army Ordnance Corps

Operation Crusader was just ending as the brigade arrived in the desert, and there was a lull of some months before active operations restarted. The rest of 50th (N) Division arrived in February, and 150th Bde reverted to its command on 22 February, but all of its brigades were to operate as independent groups in the next phase of fighting (the Battle of Gazala).

=== Battle of Gazala ===
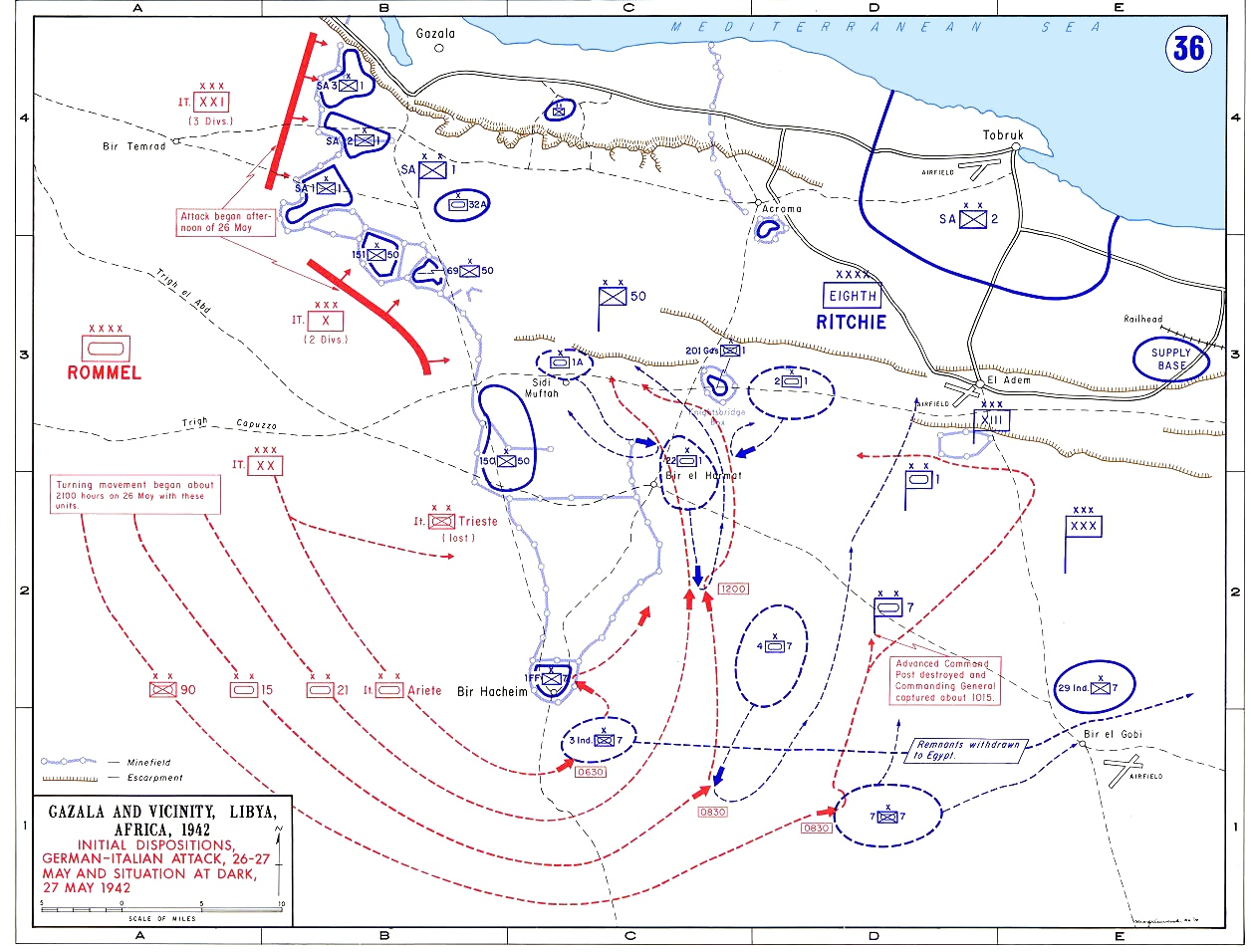
150th Brigade's position at the start of the battle can be seen in the map

The "Gazala Line" was a series of occupied "boxes" each of brigade strength set out across the desert with minefields and wire watched by regular patrols between the boxes. When General Erwin Rommel attacked on 26 May, 150th and 69th Bdes of 50th Division occupied two boxes: there was a gap of 6 miles (9.7 km) between 150th Bde at Sidi Muftah and 69th Bde to the north, and another gap of 13 miles (21 km) between 150th Bde and 1st Free French Brigade's box at Bir Hakeim to the south. The line was not equally manned, a greater number of troops covering the coast leaving the south less protected. 1st South African Division was nearest the coast, with 1st and 7th Armoured divisions waiting behind the main line as a mobile counter-attacking force. 2nd South African Division formed a garrison at Tobruk and 5th Indian Infantry Division (which had arrived in April to relieve 4th Indian Infantry Division) was held in reserve.

The German advance was spotted by the 4th South African Armoured Car Regiment at first light on 27 May. At about 08:30 they overran the 7th Armoured Divisional HQ. This scattered the 7th Motor Brigade, which withdrew to the Retma Box, fifteen miles east of Bir Hakeim, while 4th Armoured Brigade, fought all day to stem the attackers. By the afternoon, the German attack had shattered the 7th Armoured Division and they were in position to assault the 201st Guards Motor Brigade, in the Knightsbridge Box. The Germans now attacked the Retma Box, which was garrisoned by the Rangers (9th King's Royal Rifle Corps), 2nd Rifle Brigade, C Bty 4th RHA, and a Rhodesian anti-tank unit. Accompanied by heavy artillery fire the Panzers swarmed in, swiftly overrunning the 9th KRRC, with the rest of the garrison then moving back to east of Bir El Gubi. The Germans now pushed their Panzers on to the north, moving behind the Gazala Boxes, where British resistance stiffened in what became known as the Battle of the Cauldron. By the evening of 28 May it was clear to Brigadier C.W. Haydon that his 150th Bde was going to be attacked from this direction, and he pulled in his southern battalion and prepared for all-round defence, reinforced by part of 1st Army Tank Bde, including 30 tanks. The garrison of 150th Bde Box now stood at:

- 150th Infantry Brigade HQ (Brig C.W. Haydon)
  - 4th East Yorkshires
  - 4th Green Howards
  - 5th Green Howards
  - D Company, 2nd Cheshire Regiment (machine guns)
  - 72nd (Northumbrian) Field Rgt, RA
  - 25/26 Battery, 7th Medium Rgt, RA
  - 259 Battery, 55th (Norfolk Yeomanry) Anti-Tank Rgt, RA
  - 81 Battery, 25th Light Anti-Aircraft Rgt, RA
  - 232 (Northumbrian Field Company, RE
- Tactical HQ, 1st Army Tank Bde (Brig W.O.L. O'Carroll)
  - One squadron, 42nd Royal Tank Regiment
  - 44th Royal Tank Regiment

To shorten their supply lines the Axis began clearing two paths through the minefield either side of the 150th Bde Box along the Trigh el Abd and Trigh Capuzzo. The brigade kept the supply lines under artillery fire and, although it was unable to stop the flow of traffic, it made the route so ineffective that the enemy armoured divisions to the east of the minefields were reduced to a parlous state for petrol, ammunition and food. Their water ration was down to half a cup a man.

Early on 30 May elements of the Afrika Korps attempted to break through the brigade's position but drew off after taking losses. Next day the Italian Trieste Division and German 90th Light Division attacked, but made little progress against a defence that they described as 'skilful and stubborn'. On 1 June Rommel reinforced the attackers with the 21st Panzer Division and more artillery, and the assault was resumed after heavy dive-bombing. Early in the afternoon 150th Bde was overcome by a series of concentric attacks and overrun, Brigadier Haydon was killed, and the survivors (including Brigadier O'Carroll) became prisoners of war.

Panzerarmee Afrika said in its daily battle report. "The encircled enemy, supported by numerous infantry tanks, again resisted most stubbornly", "Each separate element within the fortress-like strengthened defences had to be fought for. The enemy suffered extraordinary heavy, bloody losses. Eventually the operation, which also caused considerable losses to our troops, ended in complete success"

== Commanders ==
The following commanded the brigade:

- Brigadier H.S. Kreyer (on outbreak of war)
- Lieutenant-Colonel W.E. Bush (acting from 9 April 1940)
- Brigadier C.W. Haydon (from 26 April 1940; killed in action 1 June 1942)

== Postwar ==
150th Brigade was not reformed when 50th (Northumbrian) Division was reconstituted in the Territorial Army in 1947. Instead, the reformed 4th East Yorkshires and 4th Green Howards became part of 151 Infantry Brigade, now subtitled 'Yorkshire & Durham'.

== External sources ==
Ramsden, Colin (5 September 2005). "W. H. C. Ramsden C.B., C.B.E., D.S.O., M.C." Archived from the original on 17 May 2007.

- Graham Watson, The Territorial Army 1947
