= 71 Engineer Regiment (United Kingdom) =

- Country: United Kingdom
- Branch: British Army
- Role: Combat engineering
- Size: Three field squadrons 584 personnel

71 Engineer Regiment is an Army Reserve regiment of the Royal Engineers, British Army. Its headquarters is at RAF Leuchars, Fife, and has units across Scotland, northern England and Northern Ireland. Its regular army paired unit is 39 Engineer Regiment, at Kinloss, Moray.

== History ==
The regiment was formed on 1 April 1967 from 52 Lowland Divisional Engineers, 80 (Scottish) Port Regiment, 432 (City of Edinburgh) Corps Engineer Regiment, Royal Engineers and 102 Corps Engineer Regiment (Paisley) The first CO was Lt Col Donald Macey. 432 Corps Engineer Regiment became 104 (City of Edinburgh) Squadron Royal Engineers.102 Regiment became 102 Field Squadron (AER). 80 Port regiment became RHQ. 52 Lowland divisional engineers became 124 Field Squadron. The other two Scottish regiments were 51 (Highland) Divisional Engineer Regiment and 117 Corps Engineer Regiment. They formed 117 Field Support Squadron with Hq and two troops in Dundee, and a Plant Troop in Aberdeen. 117 came under command 71 Regiment at a later date

== Current organisation ==
The regiment's current organisation is as follows:

- Regimental Headquarters and Headquarters Troop, at Waterloo Lines, Leuchars Station
- 102 (Clyde) Field Squadron (Air Support), at Anzio Lines, Paisley
  - 2 Troop, in Cumbernauld
- 103 (Tyne Electrical Engineers) Field Squadron, at Debdon Gardens, Heaton, Newcastle upon Tyne
  - 2 Troop, in Hartlepool
- 124 (Lowland) Field Squadron, in Cumbernauld
  - 2 Troop, at Waterloo Lines, Leuchars Station
  - 10 (Orkney) Troop, in Kirkwall, Orkney
  - 236 (Logistics) Troop, at Kinloss Barracks, Kinloss
- 591 (Antrim Artillery) Field Squadron, in Bangor
  - 2 Troop, at Lowfield Camp, Ballymena
  - 3 Troop, in Portadown
