= 129th Regiment =

129th Regiment may refer to:

- 129th Duke of Connaught's Own Baluchis, British Indian Army
- 129th Field Artillery Regiment, United States
- 129th Infantry Regiment (United States)
- 129th Regiment of Foot, British Army

== American Civil War regiments ==
- 129th Illinois Infantry Regiment
- 129th Indiana Infantry Regiment
- 129th New York Infantry Regiment, later the 8th New York Heavy Artillery Regiment
- 129th Ohio Infantry Regiment
- 129th Pennsylvania Infantry Regiment

== See also ==
- 129th Brigade (disambiguation)
- 129th Division (disambiguation)
- 129th (disambiguation)
