= 129th Division =

129th Division may refer to:

- 129th Division (People's Republic of China)
- 129th Infantry Division (Wehrmacht), Germany
- 129th Division (Imperial Japanese Army)
- 129th Guards Machine-Gun Artillery Division, Russia/Soviet Union
- 129th Guards Rifle Division, Soviet Union
- 129th Motor Rifle Division, Soviet Union
- 129th Rifle Division, Soviet Union

== See also ==
- List of military divisions by number
- 129th Brigade (disambiguation)
- 129th Regiment (disambiguation)
- 129th (disambiguation)
