= 2nd East Riding Artillery Volunteers =

2nd East Riding Artillery Volunteers 2nd Northumbrian Brigade, RFA 62nd (Northumbrian) HAA Regiment, RA 462 (Northumbrian) HAA Regiment, RA 440 (Humber) LAA Regiment
- Active: 1860–1992
- Country: United Kingdom
- Branch: Territorial Force
- Role: Coast Artillery; Field Artillery; Air Defence Artillery
- Garrison/HQ: Kingston upon Hull; Middlesbrough (1930s)
- Nickname: The Humber Artillery
- Engagements: Western Front (World War I); Battle of Britain; The Blitz; North Africa; Italy

The 2nd East Riding Artillery Volunteers was a part-time unit of Britain's Royal Artillery based at Hull and along the Humber Estuary. Its successor units provided field artillery on the Western Front during World War I and air defence artillery during and after World War II. Latterly it formed part of the Humber Artillery based at Hull.

== Early history ==
At times of national crisis, volunteers were regularly called upon to defend the vulnerable harbours on the coast of the East Riding of Yorkshire. At the time of the Jacobite rising of 1745, the Wardens and Brethren of Hull Trinity House formed four volunteer artillery companies, equipped with 20 nine-pounder cannon taken from a ship lying in Hull Roads. These were the first volunteer artillery units formed in Yorkshire, though there may have been others manning the cannon in the fort covering Bridlington harbour. The companies were stood down after the Jacobite defeat at Culloden.

Hull Trinity House organised a new artillery company during the French Revolutionary Wars, and a mixed unit of infantry and artillery manned the fort at Bridlington harbour. These units existed from 1794 until the Treaty of Amiens in 1802. When the peace broke down in 1803, the Bridlington Volunteer Artillery reformed, but the guns at Hull were manned by the Sea Fencibles and by Regulars.

== Volunteer Force ==
A number of new artillery companies were formed in the East Riding during the first enthusiasm for the Volunteer Movement in 1859–60. The 1st Company East Yorkshire Artillery Volunteers formed at Bridlington, the 2nd at Hunmanby, and the 3rd at Hull (from personnel of the Hull Dock Company), all in 1859. In 1860, the 4th to 9th Companies followed at Hull and these were formed into a battalion on 12 May, becoming the 4th Yorkshire (East Riding) Artillery Volunteer Corps under the command of Lieutenant-Colonel Martin Samuelson, a prominent local engineer and shipbuilder, whose brother Alexander Samuelson served as Captain of the 6th Company.

The 4th AVC competed with other Hull volunteer units for recruits, luring officers and non-commissioned officers (NCOs) away from the 2nd East Riding Rifle Volunteer Corps and recruits from the 3rd East Riding Artillery Volunteer Corps, which was disbanded in 1860. The 4th continued to expand, increasing its establishment in 1877 from eight to 12 batteries with a total of 965 men in 1878. One battery was formed by employees of Messrs Rose, Downs & Thompson (a manufacturer of oilseed crushing machinery), and another from members of the Hull Gymnastic Society. The 1st and 2nd Companies having combined to form the 1st East Riding Artillery Volunteers, the 4th was renumbered 2nd East Riding Artillery Volunteers in September 1880.

The unit leased from Hull Corporation a hall that had been built for a working men's exhibition adjacent to the Corporation Field in Park Street. The government supplied 32-pounder muzzle-loading guns in June 1860. Eight were used for drill purposes at the Hull Citadel and four were placed in a battery built on the Humber Bank adjacent to Earle's shipyard. The unit took part in national gunnery competitions, and won the Queen's Prize on several occasions. From 1886, the coastal artillery batteries were supplemented by minefields, and the 2nd East Riding AV trained with the Humber Division Submarine Miners.

As well as manning fixed coast defence artillery, some of the early Artillery Volunteers manned semi-mobile 'position batteries' of smooth-bore field guns pulled by agricultural horses. But the War Office refused to pay for the upkeep of field guns for Volunteers and they had largely died in the 1870s. In 1888, the 'position artillery' concept was revived and some Volunteer companies were reorganised as position batteries to work alongside the Volunteer infantry brigades. On 14 July 1892, the 2nd East Riding Volunteer Artillery were reorganised as one position battery and 10 garrison companies. By 1893 the War Office Mobilisation Scheme had allocated the unit to the Humber defences.

In 1882, the 2nd East Riding AV became part of the Northern Division of the Royal Artillery (later transferring to the Western Division). All Volunteer Artillery units became part of the Royal Garrison Artillery (RGA) in 1899 and with the abolition of the divisions the unit was redesignated 2nd East Riding Royal Garrison Artillery (Volunteers) on 1 January 1902.

== Territorial Force ==
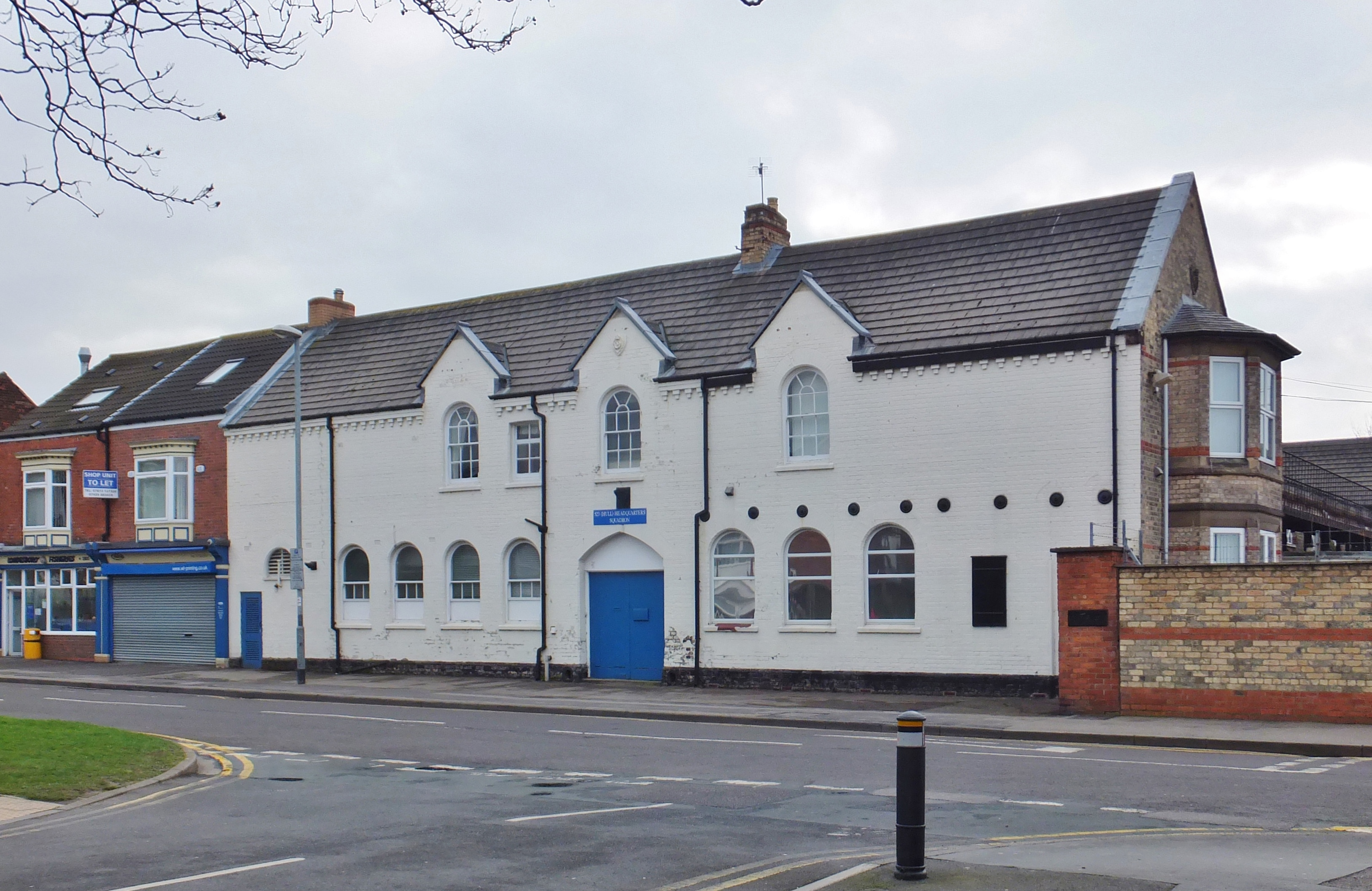
Londesborough Barracks.

With the creation of the Territorial Force by the Haldane Reforms in 1908, the RGA Volunteers were extensively reorganised. In the original plans, the 2nd East Riding RGA would have become the 3rd Northumbrian Brigade in the Royal Field Artillery (RFA), comprising 1st–3rd East Riding Batteries and 3rd Northumbrian Ammunition Column. However, these plans were revised in 1910, so that the Hull-based RGA formed two field batteries and an ammunition column in the 2nd Northumbrian Brigade, RFA, and a separate East Riding RGA with four companies of coast defence artillery. The 2nd (or II) Northumbrian Bde was completed by a North Riding Battery from the former 1st East Riding RGA.

The 2nd Northumbrian Brigade had its headquarters (HQ) at Wenlock Barracks, Anlaby Road, Hull, while the 1st and 2nd East Riding Batteries and the ammunition column shared Londesborough Barracks in Park Street with the East Riding RGA and other TF units. The North Riding Battery was at the Drill Hall in Castle Street, Scarborough.

The three batteries were each equipped with four 15-pounder guns. The brigade was part of the Northumbrian Division of the TF.

== World War I ==
=== Mobilisation ===
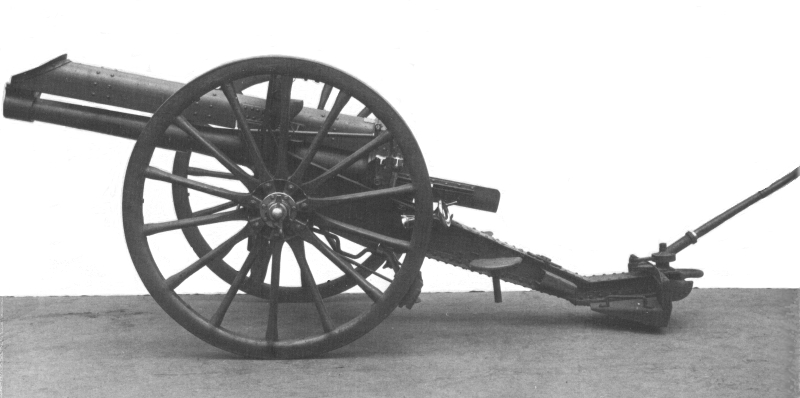
15-pounder gun, known to the gunners in France as the 'pip-squeak'.

In late July 1914, the units of the Northumbrian Division were at their annual training camp in North Wales. On 3 August, they were ordered to return to their respective headquarters, where at 17.00 next day they received orders to mobilise. This was particularly difficult for the divisional artillery, which had to gather requisitioned horses and mules and fit them with harness, and collect ammunition from Ordnance stores. The units went to their war stations along the coast, where there were numerous alerts. In October the division became part of Central Force in Home Defence and manned the Tyne Defences.

On the outbreak of war, TF units were invited to volunteer for Overseas Service and the large majority of the Northumbrian Division accepted. On 15 August, the War Office (WO) issued instructions to separate those men who had signed up for Home Service only, and form these into reserve units. On 31 August, the formation of a reserve or 2nd Line unit was authorised for each 1st Line unit where 60 per cent or more of the men had volunteered for Overseas Service. The titles of these 2nd Line units would be the same as the original, but distinguished by a '2/' prefix. In this way duplicate battalions, brigades and divisions were created, mirroring those TF formations being sent overseas.

=== 1/II Northumbrian Brigade ===
==== Ypres ====
The Northumbrian Division trained hard while manning the Tyne Defences, and orders to proceed to France to join the British Expeditionary Force (BEF) arrived on 16 April 1915. The division completed its concentration in the area of Steenvoorde on 23 April and went straight into action the next day in the Second Battle of Ypres. Casualties among the infantry were heavy during the fighting to stabilise the British line (Battle of St Julien 24–28 April), but the divisional artillery did not take part. Part of the divisional artillery first went into action at the Battle of Frezenberg Ridge (8–13 May), but 1/II Northumbrian Bde was not involved until the end. At 17.00 on 13 May it was ordered forward under the orders of the Commander, Royal Artillery, (CRA) of 28th Division, and occupied its gun positions in pitch darkness at 23.00. The batteries were south of Potijze, between the Menin and Ypres–Potijze roads, where they covered the zone between the Ypres–Westroosebeke road and the Ypres–Roulers (Roeselare) railway.

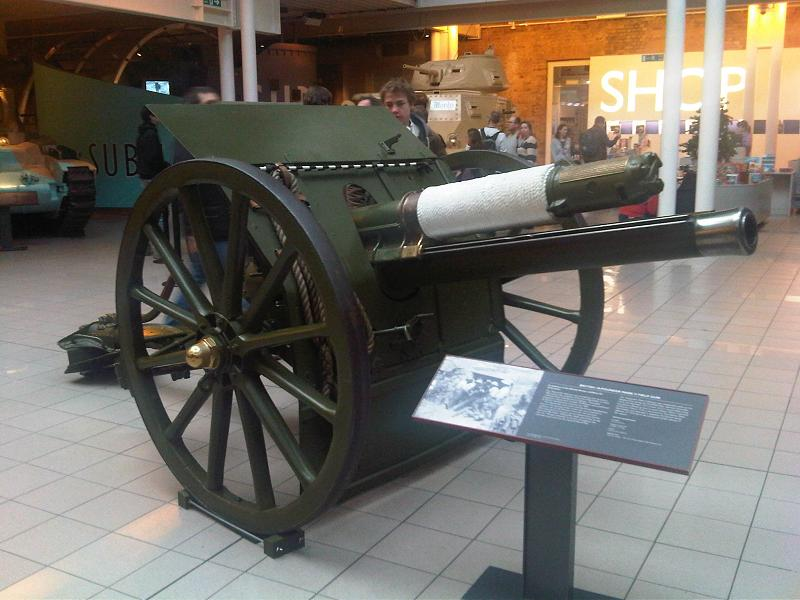
18-pounder preserved at the Imperial War Museum.

The Northumbrian Division officially became the 50th (Northumbrian) Division on 14 May. For the next 10 days, the situation was quiet apart from desultory artillery fire (the BEF was short of artillery ammunition) but on 24 May the Germans launched another serious attack accompanied with gas (the Battle of Bellewaarde Ridge). The 50th Division had been split up to reinforce other formations and the infantry were heavily engaged for two days, but with ammunition being scarce there was little the gunners could do to support them.

Over the following months, the division was concentrated and took over its own section of the line south of Ypres, with its own artillery in support. At first the 1/II Northumbrian Bde was south-east of Wippenhoek. By the end of July, the division had moved to the Armentières sector, with 1st and 2nd East Riding Btys west of Ferme de la Buterne, and 3rd North Riding Bty just east of the lunatic asylum and the railway. The division stayed in this quiet sector until mid-November, when it moved to Merris. On 23 November 1915, the brigade was re-equipped with four modern 18-pounder guns to each battery, replacing the obsolete, short-ranged 15-pounders known to the gunners as 'pip-squeaks' .

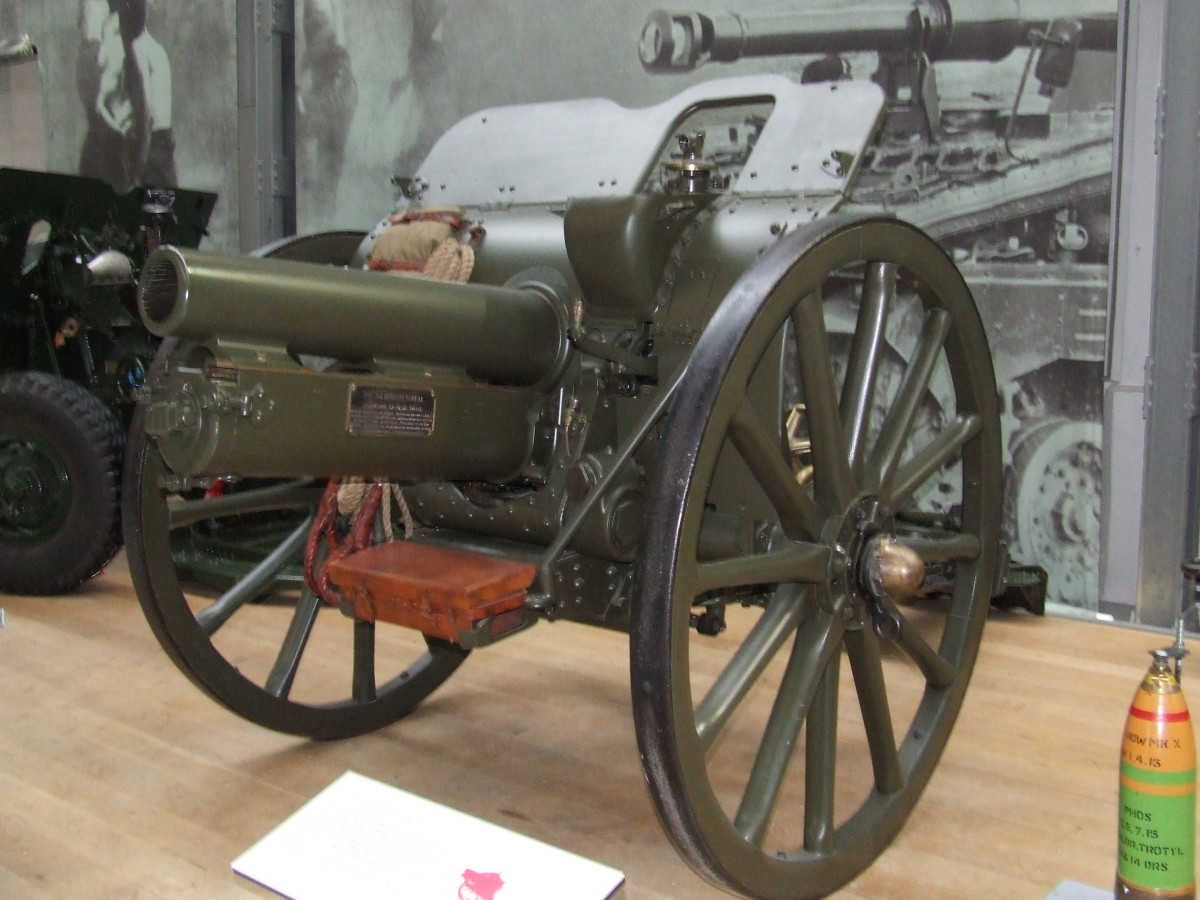
4.5-inch howitzer preserved at the Royal Artillery Museum.

In December 1915, the division returned to the Ypres Salient, in the Hill 60 sector, with the divisional artillery distributed around Zillebeke Lake, in appalling conditions. There was almost constant low-level fighting until the division was relieved at the beginning of April 1916 and moved to the Wytschaete sector. Here the observation posts on Mont Kemmel gave the gunners some advantage.

During May 1916, the BEF's artillery was reorganised. The 1/II Northumbrian Bde was numbered CCLI Brigade RFA (251 Bde) and the batteries were lettered A, B and C. The brigade formed a fourth battery, D, which was exchanged with 5th Durham Bty from the IV Northumbrian Brigade (CCLIII or 253 Bde), equipped with 4.5-inch howitzers. This became D (H) Bty. The brigade ammunition columns were merged into the divisional ammunition column.

==== Somme ====
50th (Northumbrian) Division was not involved in the Somme Offensive until its third phase (the Battle of Flers–Courcelette). CCLI Brigade, under Lt-Col F.B. Moss-Blundell, moved into position at Contalmaison on 19 August 1916, while the infantry took over the front line between 7 and 10 September. The attack was to be delivered on 15 September, preceded by three days' bombardment by the divisional artillery during which the 4.5-inch howitzers pounded the enemy defences during daylight and fired harassing gas shell at night, while the 18-pounders fired shrapnel all night to disrupt repair parties. The infantry attacked behind a creeping barrage of 18-pounder shells, the first time the divisional artillery had fired one. It started 150 yards (140 m) ahead of the British front line at Zero hour (06.20) and then advanced at 50 yards per minute until 200 yards (180 m) beyond the first objective, where it paused for an hour, providing a protective curtain of fire while the infantry reorganised. This procedure was then to be repeated for the second and third objectives. CCLI Brigade, with one battery of CCL Bde attached, fired the inner right-hand portion of the divisional barrage, supporting the advance of 7th Battalion, Northumberland Fusiliers. (On other parts of the front the attacking infantry were supported by Mark I tanks.)

7th Northumberland Fusiliers took their first objective (Hook Trench) with little trouble, but 47th (1/2nd London) Division to the right was unable to capture High Wood, and the Fusiliers suffered severe flanking fire from that dominant position. 7th Battalion was unable to follow the barrage to the second objective (the Starfish Line) and only reached it an hour late. Follow-up attacks were beaten back. However, the advance on the flank of High Wood did assist the 47th Division in finally capturing that position. An attempt to continue the attack the following morning after a 15-minute intense bombardment was a failure. It took a week of fighting for the division to reach its final objective.

The division made further piecemeal advances during the Battle of Morval (25–28 September) and then made another setpiece attack at the Battle of the Transloy Ridges at 15.15 on 1 October. The barrage laid down by the divisional artillery was described by participants as 'a perfect wave of fire without any gaps', and by a Royal Flying Corps observer as 'a most magnificent barrage. The timing ... was extremely good. Guns opened simultaneously ... As seen from the air the barrage appeared to be a most perfect wall of fire, in which it was inconceivable that anything could live'. The creeping barrage also acted as a smokescreen, and infantry advancing close behind it were onto their objectives with few casualties.

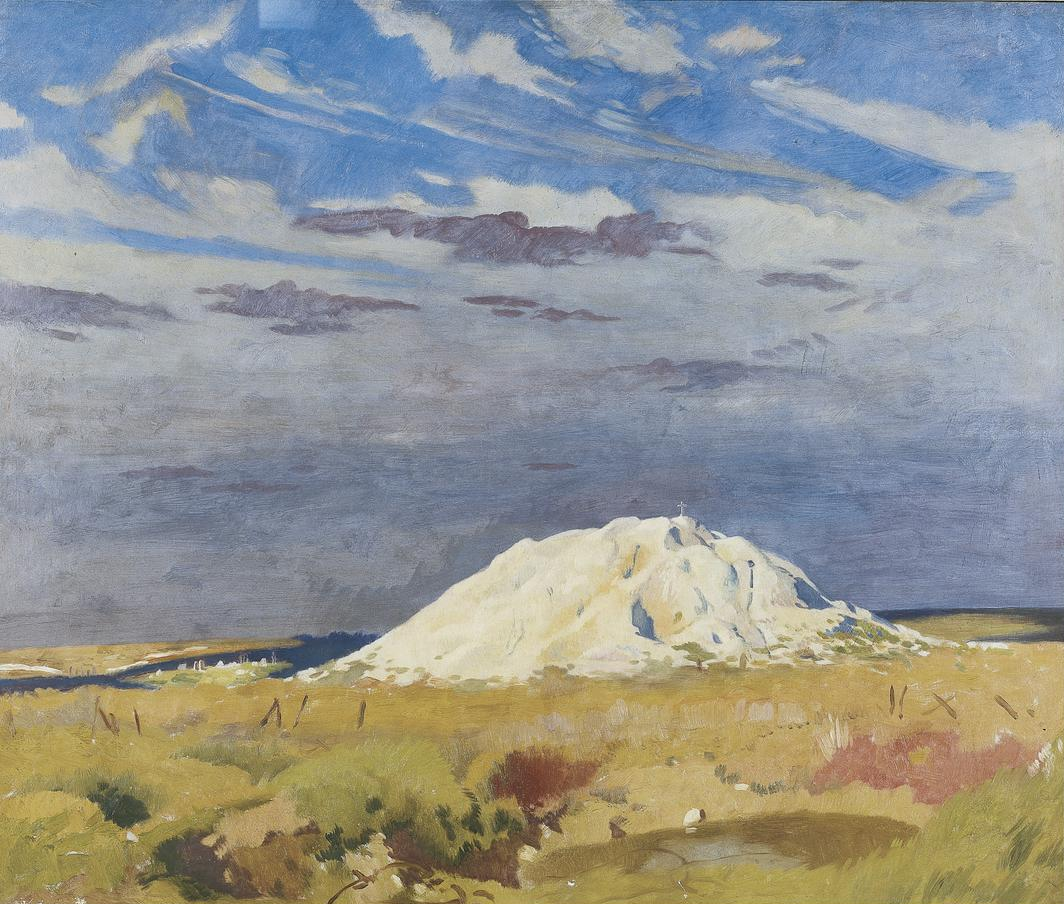
William Orpen: The Butte de Warlencourt.

On the night of 3/4 October, the division was relieved, but the artillery remained in the line, supporting other formations. The division returned on 24 October for an attack on the Butte de Warlencourt, which was several times delayed. 151st (Durham Light Infantry) Brigade finally attacked on 5 November, supported by all available guns. Because the infantry could only move slowly through the mud, the barrage advanced at only 25 yards (23 m) per minute. Although 9th Bn Durham Light Infantry crept forward behind the barrage and took their objective, the rest of the assault bogged down. After strong German counter-attacks, the infantry had been pushed back to their start line by 13.00 on 6 November, despite the efforts of the gunners to break up the counter-attacks. Further lodgements made in the enemy positions on 14 November were also driven back, and the divisional artillery was relieved that night. The task of hauling the guns out of the mud was particularly onerous.

On 16 November, a further reorganisation of field artillery was carried out, when the four-gun 18-pounder batteries were increased to six guns each. The two sections of B/253 Bty (the former D/251 Bty) rejoined, together with a section of C/253 Bty, and one two-gun section was assigned to each battery of 251st Bde. D (H) Battery continued with just four howitzers until 16 January 1917, when it was joined by Left Section of D (H)/252 Bty (the former 3rd Northumbrian Bde).

==== Arras ====
After a winter spent trench-holding, 50th Division was moved to the Arras sector for the forthcoming Arras offensive. On 25 March 1917 the divisional artillery was temporarily transferred to VII Corps and CCLI Bde moved up on 31 March to positions between Beaurains and Agny under the command of 56th (1/1st London) Division. 1 April was spent getting ammunition up to the guns and in registering targets, then from 2 April until Z Day for the First Battle of the Scarpe (9 April) the guns were engaged in the general bombardment, wire-cutting and gas shelling. The attack went in behind a barrage that was described as a 'tornado of shell fire' and was generally successful. 50th Division took over some of the captured ground on 12/13 April, and then became involved in heavy fighting round Wancourt Tower. A German counter-attack on 18 April was completely dispersed by the divisional artillery.

The advance was renewed on 23 April in the Second Battle of the Scarpe, 50th Division attacking towards Wancourt Tower, supported by the artillery of 14th (Light) Division as well as its own. The heavy barrage rolled forwards too slowly, and the infantry suffered casualties by advancing into it. They took their early objectives, but had been forced back by midday. The division attacked with a fresh brigade in the afternoon, preceded by another barrage, and held its objectives by nightfall. During the summer of 1917 the division held a section of the line, with frequent raids and exchanges of artillery fire.

==== Passchendaele ====
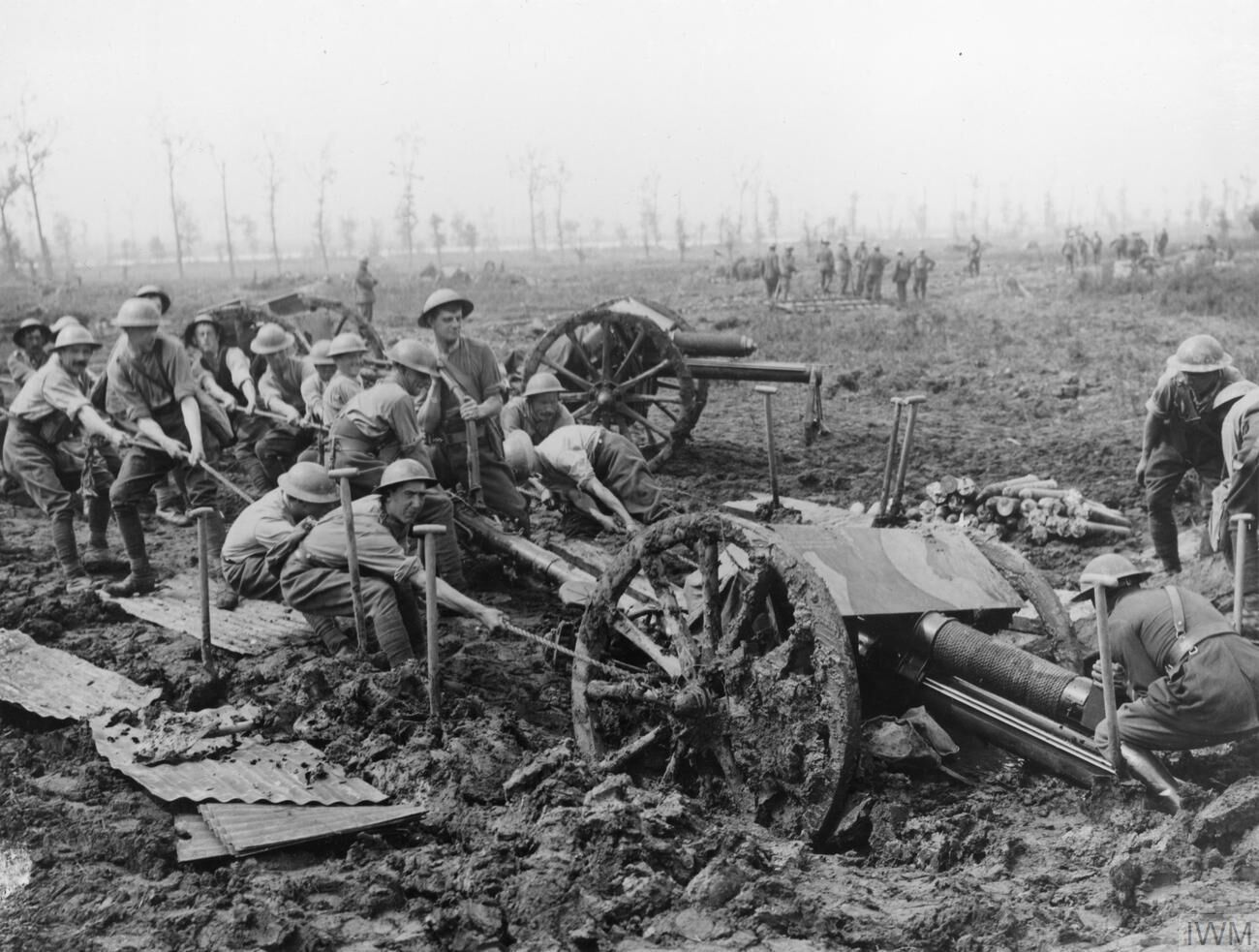
18-pounder being hauled out of mud at Ypres, 1917.

In October, 50th Division returned to the Ypres sector to take part in the last and worst phase of the Third Ypres Offensive, the Second Battle of Passchendaele. Here the problem was to get the guns up through the mud close enough to the line to fire a barrage to support the infantry through the Germans' deep defences. Five separate barrages were fired, the field guns participating in the creeping barrage and then the standing barrage. Zero hour was at 05.40 on 26 October, but from the first the infantry struggling through the mud could not keep up with the barrage, which had no effect on the concrete pillboxes. The three attacking battalions of the Northumberland Fusiliers suffered appalling casualties and gained almost no ground, while the gunners suffered heavily from shellfire, both high explosive and mustard gas. Some advances were made on 30 and 31 October, and the division was finally withdrawn for rest and training on 9 November.

==== Spring Offensive ====
50th (Northumbrian) Division was 20–25 miles behind the lines in GHQ Reserve when the German spring offensive opened on 21 March 1918 (the Battle of St Quentin), but the divisional artillery moved out that afternoon, CCLI Bde marching via Cartigny and Bouvincourt to Vraignes, and 02.00 on 22 March the batteries went into action east of Poeuilly (B/251), east and west of Sailor's Wood (D/251 and A/251) and west of Soyécourt (C/251), covering the zone near Caulières Wood. The brigade fired bursts on pre-arranged 'SOS lines' from 09.00, but the batteries were blinded by fog. The infantry of the division had crossed the River Somme and was deployed for action on the 'Green Line' by 08.00 that morning. There they attempted to improve the partially-dug defences before the troops retreating from the German advance passed through them. The division came under attack at 16.30. Unfortunately, the protective barrage from the divisional artillery came down on the defence line rather than on the attackers. A vital ridge was lost, and although the attack ceased at nightfall, the division pulled back towards the Somme Canal, covered by the darkness and next morning's mist.

At 05.30 on 23 March, CCLI Bde moved south to cover the retreat of 24th Division, and put down a protective barrage, communication being maintained by officer patrols. The brigade's guns were in turn shelled with considerable accuracy by German guns directed by reconnaissance aircraft. The brigade was then ordered to retire across the Somme Canal, which was achieved under heavy shellfire.

The division's infantry played little part in the Battle of the Somme Crossings on 24 March, but CCLI Bde had a busy day. Informed at 10.00 by 24th Infantry Bde that the enemy were crossing the largely dry canal and advancing on Morchain, A/251 Bty moved in sections to the crest of a hill and caught large numbers of Germans in the open, firing on them over open sights. C/251 and D/251 Btys fell back with 24th Bde, but it was not until 11.30 that A/251 and B/251 received orders to retire, which they did by alternate sections. The batteries came into action again between Marchélepot and Licourt for the rest of the day, firing on roads crowded with enemy troops, guns and transport, while being attacked by low-flying German aircraft.

There was further heavy fighting on 25 March. The gunners were hampered by fog in the morning, but afterwards supported the hard-pressed infantry all day. From Marchélepot and Licourt, CCLI Bde finally fetched up at Vermandovillers under the command of 24th Division. At one point in the evening, its batteries found themselves in front of the front line, the infantry having fallen back. The division was thoroughly split up and fought piecemeal during the Battle of Rosieres on 26 and 27 March, but the stubborn fighting during the retreat had slowed the German advance, which came to a halt by the end of the month. However, even when the division was relieved, its artillery remained in action with other formations, with CCLI Bde in the area of Gentelles until 8 April, under fire (particularly on 4 April) while fighting swirled back and forth round Hangard Wood before settling down.

The division had been moved to the Estaires sector, which was where the next German offensive (the Battle of Estaires) opened on 9 April. That morning the Northumbrian infantry had to advance from reserve and were committed piecemeal to relieve the Portuguese Expeditionary Force that had been driven from its positions. There followed three days of bitter fighting until the enemy advance was held. The German offensive was renewed on 12 April (the Battle of Hazebrouck), during which the division was relieved on 13 April.

==== Captured ====
The 50th Division was moved to a quiet sector to rest and absorb reinforcements. Unfortunately, the location chosen, the Chemin des Dames ridge in the French sector, was the target of the third phase of the German offensive (the Third Battle of the Aisne), which opened on 27 May. The division got word of the impending German attack, and at 20.00 on 26 May CCLI Bde was ordered to put down a bombardment on roads and approaches behind the enemy front line from 21.00 to midnight. The German guns did not reply, but at 01.00 on 27 May they opened a heavy preparation, which immediately cut all the telephone lines. The German infantry came on at 03.30, supported by tanks, and the division's front line dissolved by 05.30. Soon the enemy infantry were approaching the gunpits, where the gunners – fighting in respirators because of gas shelling – suffered heavy casualties from shellfire.

CCLI Brigade HQ was overrun and taken prisoner virtually to a man, including the CO, Lt-Col F.B. Moss-Blundell. The batteries had their left flanks turned and were taken in rear. A Battery fired point blank at the advancing infantry at a range of 60 yards and all the guns fired to the last minute. Most of the brigade's guns were put out of action by enemy shellfire, in the case of those remaining in action the breechblocks and dial sights were removed before capture. The enemy only captured the gun positions after hand-to-hand fighting. CCLI Brigade's total casualties were 19 officers and about 250 other ranks, chiefly missing.

==== Hundred Days Offensive ====
After the disaster on the Chemin des Dames, 50th (Northumbrian) Division was reduced to a training cadre. When it was reformed in the summer of 1918, all the original battalions had been replaced by others (mainly from the Macedonian front), but the artillery brigades were reconstituted under their old numbers.

The division re-entered combat in the Battle of Beaurevoir (3–5 October). By now, the Allied Hundred Days Offensive was gathering pace, the main Hindenburg Line had been crossed, and the division encountered little opposition until the second day, when the artillery greatly assisted its advance through Gouy and Le Catelet onto the high ground of Prospect Hill. On 6 October, the division forced its way into the Beaurevoir Line, the last support line of the Hindenburg defences.

After a short rest, 50th Division attacked again on 8 October (the Second Battle of Cambrai) advancing from Gouy towards Le Cateau. This was followed by the division's assault crossing of the River Selle (17 October), and then the Battle of the Sambre (4 November), where protected by a very accurate artillery barrage it quickly advanced through the Forêt de Mormal, overran the German positions and pushed on to establish bridgeheads over the River Sambre.

On 5 November, 151st Infantry Bde resumed the advance, supported by CCLI Bde. They crossed the Sambre, followed by the artillery and made for the high ground beyond. The infantry got across the Helpe Majeure river, but the crossings were impassable for the artillery. By 7 November, some guns were across, and 151st Bde, with two 18-pounders accompanying each battalion, advanced to the high ground at St Aubin and Dourlers. By 9 November the division was pursuing the defeated Germans with mobile columns.

The 50th Division had been relieved and was in billets when the Armistice with Germany came into effect on 11 November. Demobilisation began in December 1918, and the division ceased to exist in France on 19 March 1919. It began to reform in England under its old name of Northumbrian Division in April 1920.

=== 2/II Northumbrian Brigade ===
The 2nd Line TF units of the Northumbrian Division slowly assembled around Newcastle upon Tyne, where 2nd Northumbrian Divisional HQ opened in January 1915. By May 1915, all the division's Home Service men had been transferred to separate units and thenceforth the 2nd Line units had the role of training drafts for the 1st Line serving in France. While under training they were responsible for defending the stretch of coast from Seaham Harbour through Sunderland to Newcastle. The division became 63rd (2nd Northumbrian) Division on 16 August. In November the division moved into winter quarters around York and Doncaster.

In May 1916, the RFA brigades were reorganised, 2/II Northumbrian Bde becoming CCCXVI (316) Brigade, RFA and the batteries becoming A, B and C. 2/5th Durham (H) Bty joined from 2/IV Northumbrian (318) Bde and became D (H) Bty. 63rd Divisional Artillery then moved to Heytesbury to train on Salisbury Plain for overseas service. However, the decision had been made to break up the weak 63rd (2nd Northumbrian) Division and its number was transferred to the Royal Naval Division, veterans of Antwerp and Gallipoli, now arriving on the Western Front. Since the RN Division had no artillery of its own, 63rd Divisional Artillery was now assigned to it.

The brigade disembarked at Le Havre on 3 July 1916. On 26 July it was reorganised, 1/5th Kent (H) Bty joining from IV Home Counties (223) Bde as D (H) Bty. However, 316 Bde was broken up among the other RFA brigades of 63rd (RN) Division at the end of August 1916 before seeing any significant action as a unit.

== Interwar ==
When the TF was reconstituted as the Territorial Army (TA), the 2nd Northumbrian Bde reformed on 7 February 1920 with an extra battery (formerly the Northumbrian Division's Heavy Battery). In 1921 the brigade and its batteries were renumbered:

73rd (Northumbrian) Brigade, RFA

- HQ at Wenlock Barracks, Hull (moving to Artillery Barracks, Lytton Street, Middlesbrough in the 1930s)
- 289 (1st East Riding) Battery at Hull
- 290 (2nd East Riding) Battery at Hull
- 291 (1st North Riding) Battery at Upgang Lane, Whitby
- 292 (2nd North Riding) Battery (Howitzers) at Grange Road, Middlesbrough (moving to the Artillery Barracks, Lytton Street, before 1930) – formerly the Northumbrian (North Riding) Heavy Battery
  - No 1 Cadet Battery (St Mary's College, Middlesbrough) attached to 292 Bty

The unit continued to form part of 50th (Northumbrian) Division. In 1924, the Royal Field Artillery was subsumed into the Royal Artillery (RA) after which RFA brigades were termed Field Brigades, RA.

=== Anti-Aircraft conversion ===
In the 1930s, the increasing need for anti-aircraft (AA) defence for Britain's cities was addressed by converting a number of TA units to that role. 73rd (Northumbrian) Field Bde became 62nd (Northumbrian) AA Bde on 10 December 1936, and the four batteries were renumbered 172 (1st ER) to 175 (2nd NR). The unit formed part of 30th (Northumbrian) AA Group in 2 AA Division.

As international tensions increased, the TA's AA strength grew rapidly, much of this expansion being achieved by splitting existing units. In March 1938, the two North Riding batteries (174 and 175) were transferred to form a new 85th (Tees) AA Bde at Middlesbrough, while 73rd Bde's HQ returned to Hull and the unit was brought up to strength with 221 (1st West Riding) Bty at York converted from a battery of 54th (West Riding and Durham) Medium Bde. It also formed a new 266 (3rd East Riding) Bty at Hull on 29 October 1938. On 1 January 1939, all RA AA brigades were redesignated as regiments. The last change in 62 AA Rgt's composition before the outbreak of war came on 7 March 1939, when 221 Bty left to form part of another new regiment, 91st AA Rgt.

== World War II ==
=== Mobilisation and Phoney War ===
The TA's AA units were mobilised on 23 September 1938 during the Munich Crisis, with units manning their emergency positions within 24 hours, even though many did not yet have their full complement of men or equipment. The emergency lasted three weeks, and they were stood down on 13 October. In February 1939 the existing AA defences came under the control of a new Anti-Aircraft Command. In June, a partial mobilisation of TA units was begun in a process known as 'couverture', whereby each AA unit did a month's tour of duty in rotation to man selected gun positions. On 24 August, ahead of the declaration of war, AA Command was fully mobilised at its war stations.

On mobilisation, the regiment manned gunsites in the Humber Gun Zone as part of 39 AA Bde in 2 AA Division (although a new 7 AA Division was being formed to cover the area north of the Humber, its exact responsibilities had still to be worked out), and drew its ammunition from the magazine at Paull. On the outbreak of war, the Humber Gun Zone had 30 heavy AA guns, of which 28 were operational.

Shortly after the outbreak of war, a number of the regiment's TA officers volunteered to transfer to the Regular 4th AA Rgt, which was deploying to France with the British Expeditionary Force.

On 23 September 1939, 62nd AA Rgt and the Humber Gun Zone were transferred to the command of 31 (North Midland) AA Bde in 7 AA Division, but returned to 39 AA Bde in 2 AA Division in May 1940.

39 AA Brigade already referred to its AA units equipped with heavy AA guns (3-inch, 3.7-inch or 4.5-inch) as HAA (to distinguish them from the newer light AA or LAA units that were being formed; this became official across the Royal Artillery on 1 June 1940 and the regiment became 62nd (Northumbrian) HAA Rgt on 1 June.

=== Battle of Britain and Blitz ===
After the Fall of France, German day and night air raids and mine laying began along the East Coast of England, intensifying through June 1940. Several times the Humber HAA guns (62nd and 91st HAA Rgts) were in action against aircraft attacking the Salt End and North Killingholme oil installations north and south of the estuary, and the guns scored their first 'kill' on the night of 26/27 June. At this time, 62nd HAA Rgt had 173 (2nd East Riding), 198 (from 67th (York and Lancaster) HAA Rgt) and 409 HAA Btys under command; in August, it had 172 (1st East Riding) and 198 HAA Btys, while 173 was in the Sheffield Gun Zone under 67th HAA Rgt and 409 HAA Bty had gone to the Derby Gun Zone. As of 11 July, the Humber Gun Zone had 38 operational HAA guns.

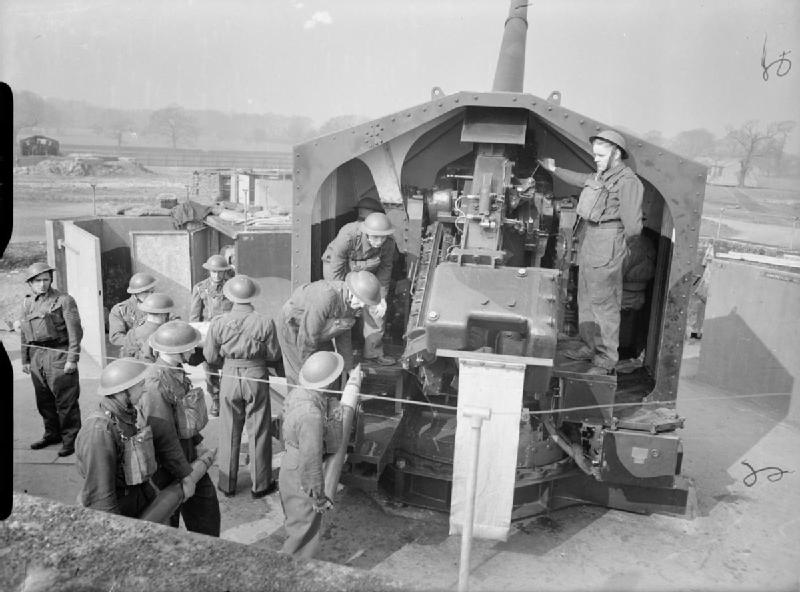
4.5-inch gun and crew in Yorkshire during the Blitz.

Luftwaffe night raids over the Humber increased during August while the Battle of Britain was under way, but were still small in scale. By October, 62nd HAA Rgt on the north bank of the Humber had all three of its own batteries back under command, manning static 4.5-inch guns, together with 198 HAA Bty until that went to reinforce the defences of London as The Blitz got under way. The AA Defence Commander (AADC) and Gun Operations Room (GOR) for the Humber Gun Zone (later Gun Defence Area, GDA) were based at Wenlock Barracks.

A new 10 AA Division was created in November 1940, and 39th AA Bde was transferred to it, retaining its responsibility for the defence of the Humber Estuary and Scunthorpe.

Throughout the night of 12/13 December the Humber guns engaged large numbers of bombers passing over on their way to attack Sheffield and Rotherham (the Sheffield Blitz). In February 1941 the Luftwaffe began a campaign of intensive minelaying in the Humber, and 'barrage fire' against the circling raiders was pretty much guesswork. However, barrage fire partially disrupted a heavy raid against Hull and Grimsby on the night of 23/24 February. Predicted concentrations, using Gun Laying (GL) Radar, were more effective if there were not too many targets.

The regiment sent a cadre of experienced officers and other ranks to 206th Training Regiment at Arborfield to provide the basis of a new 407 HAA Bty; this was formed on 16 January 1941 and joined the regiment temporarily on 10 April and then permanently from 10 June. 62nd HAA Rgt was also reinforced from 26 March to 19 May by 242 HAA Bty of 77th (Welsh) HAA Rgt on loan from Cardiff.

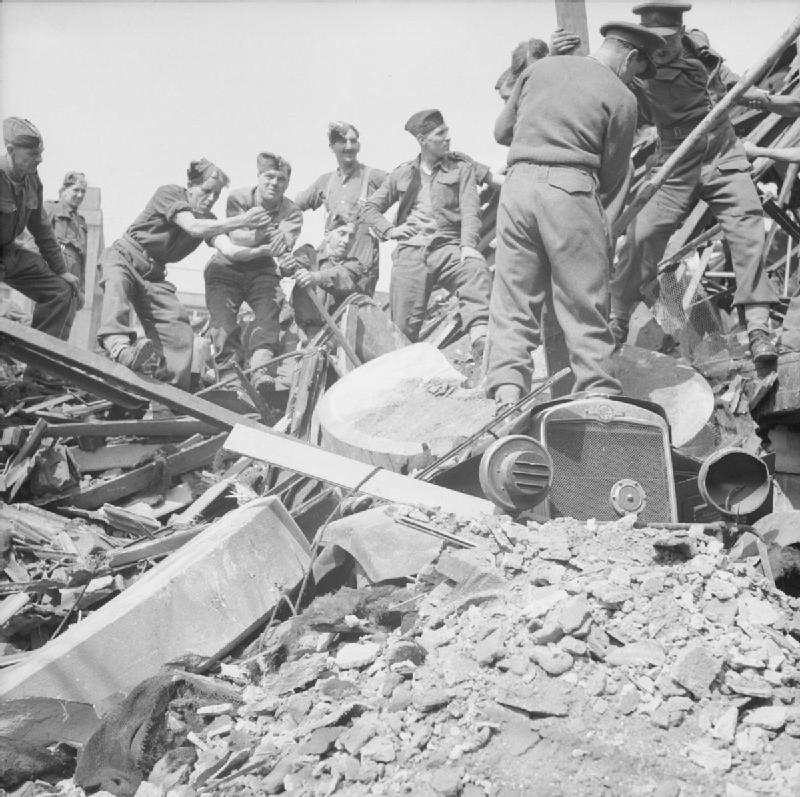
Troops of 9th Battalion, The Hampshire Regiment, helping to clear bomb damage in Hull.

Hull was raided regularly during the better weather of March 1941 (the Hull Blitz), with a serious raid on 13/14 March leaving many fires burning and numerous casualties, while Hull Docks was attacked on 31 March/1 April. The most concentrated attacks came on the nights of 7/8 and 8/9 May. On the first night, fires started in the city acted as a beacon for subsequent waves of bombers, and the telephone lines to the GOR were cut. The Humber guns fired 1950 rounds that night. On the second night, the bombers starting dive-bombing the still-burning city in groups, making predicted fire difficult, but the guns fired about 3400 rounds. The two-night blitz resulted in over 400 deaths in the city. However, after mid-May the number of raids against the UK tailed away and the Blitz is considered to have ended on 16 May, though periodic raids still occurred.

The regiment provided further cadres. One was for 442 HAA Bty formed on 12 June 1941 at 210th HAA Training Rgt, Oswestry, which joined 130th (Mixed) HAA Rgt ('Mixed' units being those into which women of the Auxiliary Territorial Service were integrated). Another cadre was for 466 HAA Bty formed on 7 August 1941 at 210th HAA Training Rgt, which became Mixed on 3 September and joined 135th (M) HAA Rgt.

The number of 4.5-inch HAA guns in the Humber GDA continued to increase during 1941, and on 5 September the regiment was reinforced by 184 HAA Bty from 66th (Leeds Rifles) HAA Rgt, replaced in November by 340 HAA Bty from 95th HAA Rgt until 10 December. In November, RHQ, including the GOR, left Wenlock Barracks and moved out of the city to Wawne Hall.

=== Mobile training ===
62nd HAA Regiment now became a unit of the field force rostered for overseas service. On 15 February 1942 it left 39 AA Bde, and joined 11 AA Bde for mobile training at Yeovil, while 407 HAA Bty transferred to 128th HAA Rgt as the 62nd adopted the three-battery organisation of field force HAA regiments. Between training, field force AA units were loaned back to AA Command, and by April the 62nd had joined 70 AA Bde in 4 AA Division in North West England.

In July 1942, 62nd HAA Rgt left AA Command and came under direct WO control. By November it had attached to it the ancillary sub-units to make it fully mobile to take part in Operation Torch:

- RHQ
- 172, 173, 266 Btys
- 62 HAA Rgt Signal Section, Royal Corps of Signals
- 62 HAA Workshop, Royal Electrical and Mechanical Engineers (REME)
- 62 HAA Rgt Platoon, Royal Army Service Corps

=== North Africa ===
The regiment landed in North Africa with 62 AA Bde and had joined Allied Force Headquarters by 18 December 1942. 62 AA Bde was the second AA formation to arrive, and its role was to relieve the most mobile AA units at Algiers and allow them to advance with the Allied Forces as they drove eastwards. 62nd HAA Regiment had one battery deployed at the port of Algiers by mid-January 1943. Further arrivals allowed 62 AA Bde to extend its area eastwards, and by mid-March 62nd HAA Rgt had 4-gun troops at Algiers, at Blida and Maison Blanche airfields, and 1 1(1/2) batteries (12 guns) at Bougie harbour. Algiers and Bougie were defined as Vulnerable Areas (VAs) and were designated as Inner Artillery Zones (IAZs) where the guns were permitted to fire at any aircraft within 12,000 yards (11,000 m) unless they returned Identification friend or foe (IFF) signals.

In the final phase of the campaign, Operation Vulcan in mid-May, the regiment was deployed with two batteries at Bougie and one at Djidjelli airfield, now under 25 AA Bde.

=== Italy ===
Until April 1944, the regiment remained in North Africa with 52 AA Bde, protecting the ports of Bizerta, Bône and Philippeville from which the invasions of Sicily and Italy were launched and supplied. The brigade landed at Barletta in south-east Italy on 22 April 1944. It moved up to the Foggia Airfield Complex and in July it relieved 8 AA Bde. 62nd HAA Regiment then moved with 8 AA Bde across Italy, first to Civitavecchia and the US airfields on the Tiber plain, then back across to Ancona. In the second half of 1944, with the threat from the Luftwaffe greatly reduced, AA units in Italy began to be withdrawn for disbandment. By January 1945, most of 8 AA Bde had left, but 62nd HAA Rgt remained deployed at Ancona until early May, when all AA defence commitments ended and the regiment instead formed a transport pool for the Allied occupying force.

Regimental HQ with 172, 173 and 266 HAA Btys was placed in suspended animation on 10 December 1945.

== Postwar ==
When the TA was reconstituted on 1 January 1947, the regiment reformed at Hull as 462 (Northumbrian) HAA Rgt and, on 14 July the following year, it became a 'Mixed' unit, indicating that members of the Women's Royal Army Corps (WRAC) were integrated into it. It also had a HAA Workshop of the REME at the Walton Street TA Centre in Hull. The regiment formed part of 57 AA Bde (the former 31 AA Bde) based at Immingham, but that formation was disbanded in 1948. On 1 January 1954, the regiment absorbed 676 HAA Rgt, a short-lived unit that had been formed postwar at Hull.

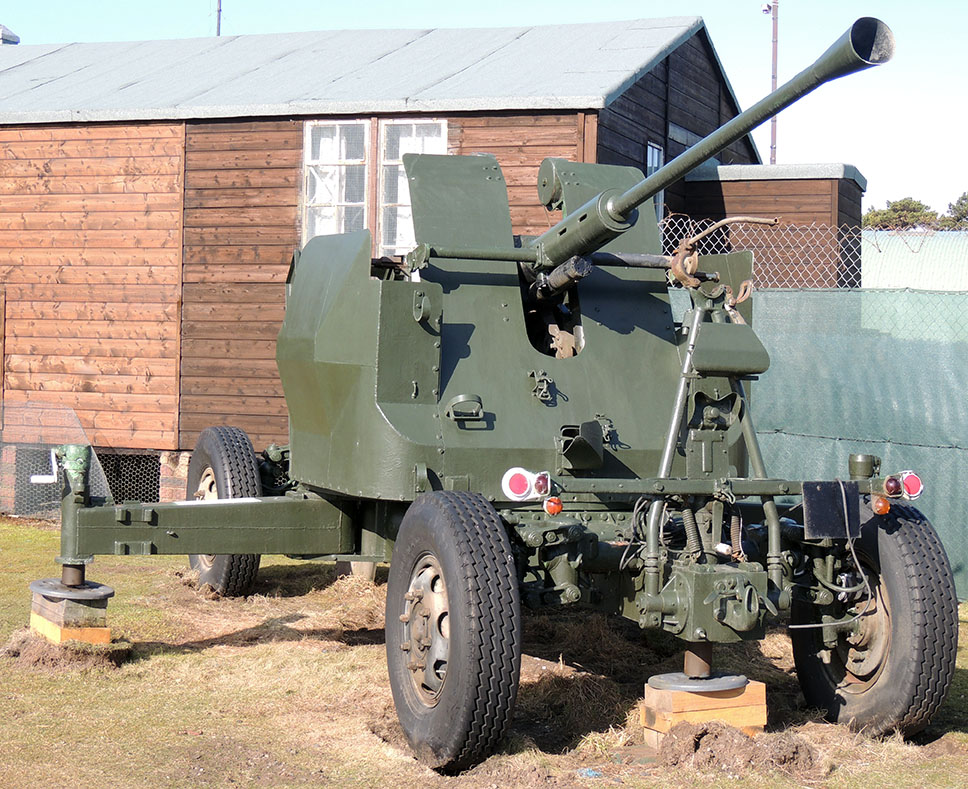
Bofors 40 mm L/70 LAA gun preserved at Montrose Air Station Heritage Centre.

AA Command was disbanded in 1955 and there were wholescale disbandments and mergers among the TA's AA units. On 10 March 1955, 462 HAA Rgt amalgamated with the Lincolnshire-based 529 LAA Rgt and 581 (5th Bn The Royal Lincolnshire Regiment) HAA Rgt to form 440 (Humber) LAA Rgt with the following organisation by 1960:

- RHQ at Wenlock Barracks, Hull
- P Battery at Hull
- Q Battery at Grimsby and Louth
- R (5th Royal Lincolnshire Regt) Battery at Scunthorpe, later Grimsby
- S Battery (ex 529 LAA Rgt, disbanded 1 May 1960)
- 440 (Humber) Light Aid Detachment, REME, at Hull

Many of the WRACs who could not be accommodated in the merged regiment transferred to a squadron of the Royal Corps of Signals that was also based at Wenlock Barracks. The merged regiment was equipped with electrically operated L/70 Bofors guns to deal with low-flying aircraft, and training was handled by the men of the former 529 LAA Rgt. In 1961 the LAA part of its title was dropped, and then in 1964 it became a Light Air Defence regiment. In the 1960s the regiment was granted the Freedom of the City of Hull and the Boroughs of Scunthorpe and Grimsby, and formed its own band.

A further reduction in 1967 saw the TA reorganised as the TAVR and, on 1 April 1967, the regiment became The Humber Regiment RA (Territorials), without guns:

- P (East Riding) Battery at Hull
- Q Battery at Grimsby (absorbed elements of 594 Ambulance Squadron, Royal Corps of Transport)
- R (5 Lincoln) Battery at Scunthorpe

On 1 January 1969, the Humber Regiment was reduced to an eight-man cadre located with 250 (Hull) Field Ambulance, Royal Army Medical Corps; part of P Bty went to 129 (East Riding) Field Squadron, Royal Engineers, at Hull (descended from the East Riding Royal Garrison Artillery); part of Q Bty formed a platoon in 16 Independent Company, Parachute Regiment, at Grimsby.

However, on 1 April 1971, the unit was reconstituted from the cadre at Hull as A (The Humber Artillery) Battery, 2nd Battalion, Yorkshire Volunteers at Wenlock Barracks. The battery became an infantry company in 1975 and, on 1 December 1977, it was amalgamated with B Company of the battalion at Londesborough Barracks. The Humber Artillery lineage was discontinued until 1 April 1991, when E (The Humber Artillery) Company reformed at Mona House, Hull, from elements of 2nd Bn and of 129 Field Sqn.

Finally, on 4 April 1992, E Company was reabsorbed by B Company and the Humber Artillery lineage ended.

== Honorary Colonel ==
The following served as Honorary Colonel of the unit:

- William Denison, 1st Earl of Londesborough, appointed 11 August 1860
- Beilby Lawley, 3rd Lord Wenlock, appointed 30 March 1881
- O. Sanderson, appointed 8 August 1914
- Colonel F.B. Moss-Blundell, CMG, DSO, TD, appointed 21 September 1927
- Major Lawrence Dundas, 2nd Marquess of Zetland, appointed 30 November 1932

== Memorial ==
A memorial plaque was placed in Holy Trinity Church, Hull, in 1960 to mark the centenary of the East Yorkshire Artillery Volunteers. Its full wording is:

THIS TABLET WAS PLACED HERE TO MARK THE CENTENARY/ YEAR IN 1960 OF THE FORMATION OF THE EAST YORKSHIRE/ ARTILLERY VOLUNTEERS AND IN RECOGNITION OF THE/ FAITHFUL AND GALLANT SERVICES OF THOSE CITIZENS OF/ KINGSTON UPON HULL AND OTHERS WHO SERVED IN PEACE AND/ WAR AS ARTILLERY MEN IN THE UNDERMENTIONED REGIMENT/ 3RD EAST YORKSHIRE ARTILLERY VOLUNTEERS 2ND EAST YORKSHIRE ARTILLERY VOLUNTEERS 2ND EAST RIDING OF YORKSHIRE/ RGA VOLUNTEERS 2ND NORTHUMBRIAN BRIGADE RFA T.F. EAST RIDING RGA T.F. 77TH SIEGE BATTERY RGA T.F./ 165 SIEGE BATTERY RGA T.F. 251ST BRIGADE T.F. 73RD NORTHUMBRIAN FIELD BRIGADE RA T.A. EAST RIDING HEAVY/ BRIGADE RA T.A. 62ND HEAVY A.A. REGIMENT RA T.A. 422 EAST RIDING COAST REGIMENT RA T.A. 462 MIXED HEAVY/ A.A. REGIMENT RA T.A. 676 A.A. REGIMENT RA T.A. 440 HUMBER LIGHT A.A. REGIMENT RA T.A.

== Sources ==
- Ian F.W. Beckett, Riflemen Form: A Study of the Rifle Volunteer Movement 1859–1908, Aldershot, The Ogilby Trusts, 1982, ISBN 0 85936-271 X.
- Maj A.F. Becke,History of the Great War: Order of Battle of Divisions, Part 2a: The Territorial Force Mounted Divisions and the 1st-Line Territorial Force Divisions (42–56), London: HM Stationery Office, 1935/Uckfield: Naval & Military Press, 2007, ISBN 1-847347-39-8.
- Maj A.F. Becke,History of the Great War: Order of Battle of Divisions, Part 2b: The 2nd-Line Territorial Force Divisions (57th–69th), with the Home-Service Divisions (71st–73rd) and 74th and 75th Divisions, London: HM Stationery Office, 1937/Uckfield: Naval & Military Press, 2007, ISBN 1-847347-39-8.
- Maj A.F. Becke,History of the Great War: Order of Battle of Divisions, Part 3b: New Army Divisions (30–41) and 63rd (R.N.) Division, London: HM Stationery Office, 1939/Uckfield: Naval & Military Press, 2007, ISBN 1-847347-41-X.
- David Blanchard, Aisne 1918, Barnsley: Pen & Sword, 2015, ISBN 978-178337605-6.
- Gregory Blaxland, Amiens: 1918, London: Frederick Muller, 1968/Star, 1981, ISBN 0-352-30833-8.
- Basil Collier, History of the Second World War, United Kingdom Military Series: The Defence of the United Kingdom, London: HM Stationery Office, 1957.
- Brig-Gen Sir James E. Edmonds & Lt-Col R. Maxwell-Hyslop, History of the Great War: Military Operations, France and Belgium 1918, Vol V, 26th September–11th November, The Advance to Victory, London: HM Stationery Office, 1947/Imperial War Museum and Battery Press, 1993, ISBN 1-870423-06-2.
- Maj L.F. Ellis, "History of the Second World War: United Kingdom Military Series: Victory in the West", Volume II: "The Defeat of Germany", London: HMSO, 1968/Uckfield: Naval & Military, 2004, ISBN 1 845740 59 9.
- Gen Sir Martin Farndale, History of the Royal Regiment of Artillery: Western Front 1914–18, Woolwich: Royal Artillery Institution, 1986, ISBN 1-870114-00-0.
- Gen Sir Martin Farndale, History of the Royal Regiment of Artillery: The Years of Defeat: Europe and North Africa, 1939–1941, Woolwich: Royal Artillery Institution, 1988/London: Brasseys, 1996, ISBN 1-85753-080-2.
- J.B.M. Frederick, Lineage Book of British Land Forces 1660–1978, Vol II, Wakefield, Microform Academic, 1984, ISBN 1-85117-009-X.
- Peter Hart, Bloody April: Slaughter in the Skies over Arras, 1917, London: Weidenfeld & Nicolson, 2005, ISBN 0-297-84621-3.
- Joslen, H. F. (2003) [1960]. Orders of Battle: Second World War, 1939–1945. Uckfield, East Sussex: Naval and Military Press. ISBN 978-1-84342-474-1.
- Norman E.H. Litchfield, The Territorial Artillery 1908–1988 (Their Lineage, Uniforms and Badges), Nottingham: Sherwood Press, 1992, ISBN 0-9508205-2-0.
- Norman Litchfield & Ray Westlake, The Volunteer Artillery 1859–1908 (Their Lineage, Uniforms and Badges), Nottingham: Sherwood Press, 1982, ISBN 9780950820507.
- J. McWilliams & R.J. Steel, Gas! The Battle for Ypres, 1915, St Catharines, Ontario: Vanwell Publishing, 1985, ISBN 0-920277-01-2.
- Martin Middlebrook, The Kaiser's Battle, 21 March 1918: The First Day of the German Spring Offensive, London: Allen Lane, 1978/Penguin, 1983, ISBN 0-14-017135-5.
- R.W.S. Norfolk, Militia, Yeomanry and Volunteer Forces of the East Riding 1689–1908, York: East Yorkshire Local History Society, 1965.
- Titles and Designations of Formations and Units of the Territorial Army, London: War Office, 7 November 1927.
- Everard Wyrall, The Fiftieth Division 1914–1919, 1939/Uckfield: Naval & Military, nd, ISBN 1-84342-206-9.

=== External sources ===
- Land Forces of Britain, the Empire and Commonwealth
- Grace's Guide to British Industrial History
- Imperial War Museum War Memorials Register.
- The Long, Long Trail Archived 15 October 2015 at the Wayback Machine
- The Regimental Warpath 1914–1918
- The Royal Artillery 1939–45
- Yorkshire Volunteers Regimental Association
