= 12/9 =

12/9 may refer to:

- December 9 (month-day date notation)
- September 12 (day-month date notation)
- 12 shillings and 9 pence in UK predecimal currency

== See also ==
- 129 (disambiguation)
- 9/12 (disambiguation)
