= 129 =

129 may refer to:

- AD 129, a year of the Julian calendar
- 129 (number), the natural number following 128 and preceding 130
- 129 BC, a year of the Julian calendar
- 129 (East Riding) Field Squadron, Royal Engineers
- 129 (New Jersey bus)
- LZ 129 Hindenburg, an airship
- Henschel Hs 129, a German World War II ground-attack aircraft
- K129 (disambiguation)
- 129 (barge), an American whaleback barge
- 129 Antigone, a main-belt asteroid

== See also ==
- 129th (disambiguation)
- List of highways numbered 129
