= Londesborough Barracks =

- Kingston upon Hull
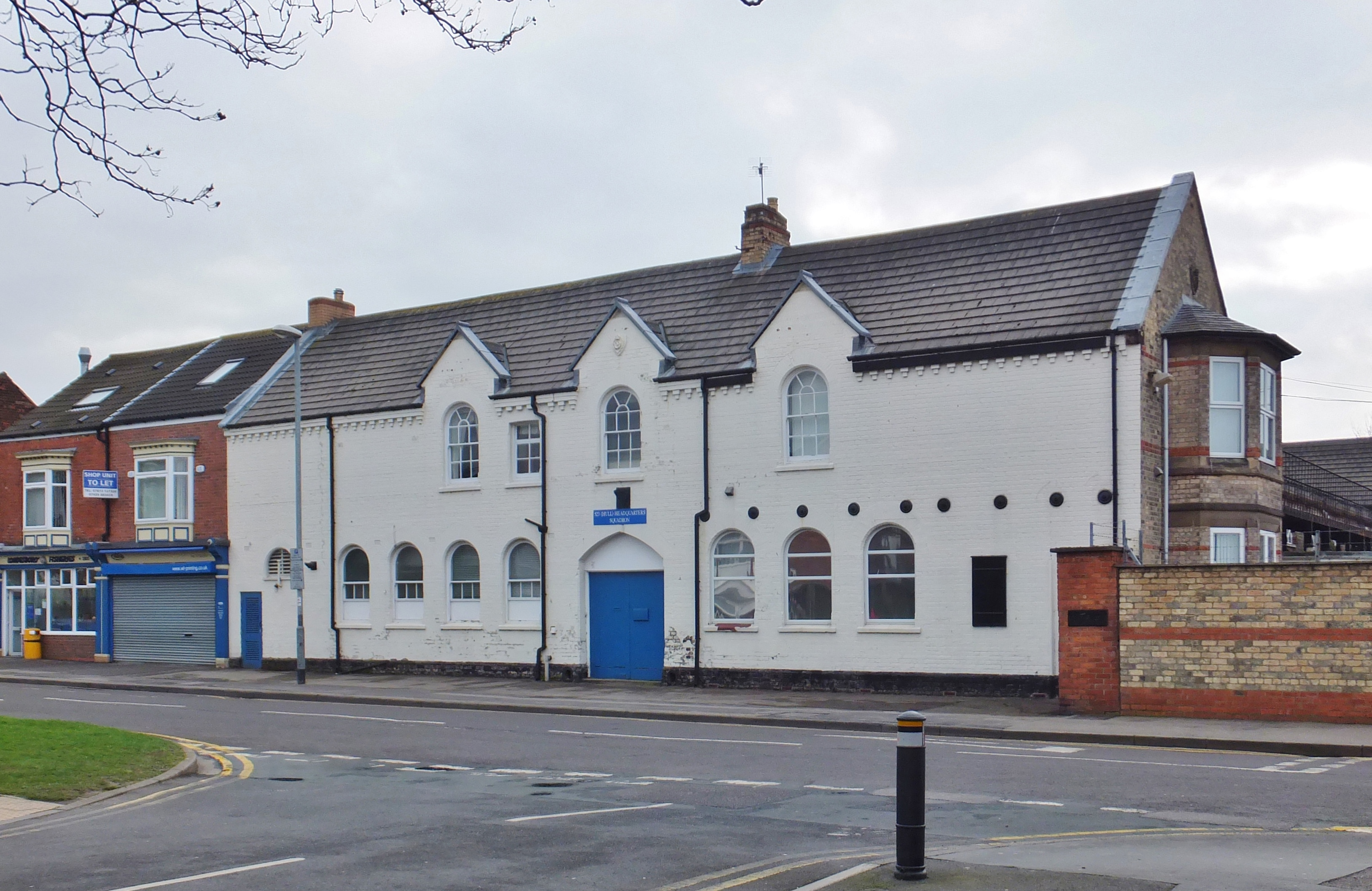
- Londesborough Barracks

Site information
- Type: Drill hall

Location
- Location within East Riding of Yorkshire
- Coordinates: 53.74620°N 0.35447°W

Site history
- Built: 1864
- Built for: 1st Yorkshire (East Riding) RVC
- In use: 1864-Present

Londesborough Barracks is a military installation in Kingston upon Hull, England.

== History ==
The building was designed as the headquarters of the 1st Yorkshire (East Riding) Rifle Volunteer Corps and was completed in 1864. The barracks were named after Lord Londesborough, honorary colonel of the corps. This unit evolved to become the 1st Volunteer Battalion, The East Yorkshire Regiment in 1883 and the 4th Battalion, The East Yorkshire Regiment in 1908. The battalion was mobilised at the drill hall in August 1914 before being deployed to the Western Front. The 1st and 2nd East Riding Batteries and Ammunition Column of the II Northumbrian Brigade, Royal Field Artillery, were also based at Londesborough Barracks, although their brigade HQ was at Wenlock Barracks in Anlaby Road.

Elements of the 4th Battalion, The East Yorkshire Regiment continued to use the drill hall until the battalion amalgamated with the 5th Battalion The West Yorkshire Regiment (Prince of Wales's Own) to form the 3rd Battalion the Prince of Wales's Own Regiment of Yorkshire in 1960. After the new battalion was established at Lumley Barracks in York, the barracks were handed over to the Royal Logistic Corps ('RLC') and 150 Regiment RLC was formed at Londesborough Barracks in 1967.

== Current units ==
The following units are currently based at the barracks:

- Regimental Headquarters, 150 Regiment, Royal Logistic Corps
  - Band of 150 Regiment RLC
  - 523 (Headquarters) Squadron
