= East Riding Royal Garrison Artillery =

- Cap Badge of the Royal Artillery (pre-1953)
- Active: 1908–1992
- Country: United Kingdom
- Branch: Territorial Force
- Role: Coast Artillery; Siege Artillery; Field Engineers; Air Defence Artillery
- Garrison/HQ: Kingston upon Hull
- Engagements: Battle of the Somme; Third Battle of Ypres; Hundred Days Offensive

The East Riding Royal Garrison Artillery (ERRGA) was a part-time unit of Britain's Royal Artillery based at Hull in the East Riding of Yorkshire. It provided coastal defence artillery for the Humber Estuary from 1908 to 1956, manned siege batteries on the Western Front during World War I at the Somme and Ypres and played a role in the pursuit of the German army during the Hundred Days Offensive. It served as infantry in Allied-occupied Germany after World War II. Its successor units in the Territorial Army included anti-aircraft artillery and field engineers.

== Early history ==
At times of national crisis, volunteers were regularly called upon to defend the vulnerable harbours on the coast of East Yorkshire. During the Jacobite rising of 1745, the Wardens and Brethren of Hull Trinity House formed four volunteer artillery companies, equipped with 20 nine-pounder cannon from a ship lying in Hull roads. These were the first volunteer artillery units formed in Yorkshire, though there may have been others manning the cannon in the fort covering Bridlington harbour. The companies were stood down after the Jacobite defeat at Culloden.

Hull Trinity House organised a new artillery company during the French Revolutionary Wars, and a mixed unit of infantry and artillery manned the fort at Bridlington harbour. These units existed from 1794 until the Treaty of Amiens in 1802. When the peace broke down in 1803, the Bridlington Volunteer Artillery reformed, but the guns at Hull were manned by the Sea Fencibles and by Regulars.

== Volunteer Force ==
See main article: 2nd East Riding Artillery Volunteers

A number of new artillery companies were formed in the East Riding during the first enthusiasm for the Volunteer Movement in 1859–60, including the 4th to 9th Companies at Hull. These were formed into a battalion in 1860, becoming the 4th (Yorkshire East Riding) Artillery Volunteer Corps under the command of Lieutenant-Colonel Martin Samuelson, a prominent local engineer and shipbuilder, whose brother Alexander Samuelson served as captain of the 6th Company.

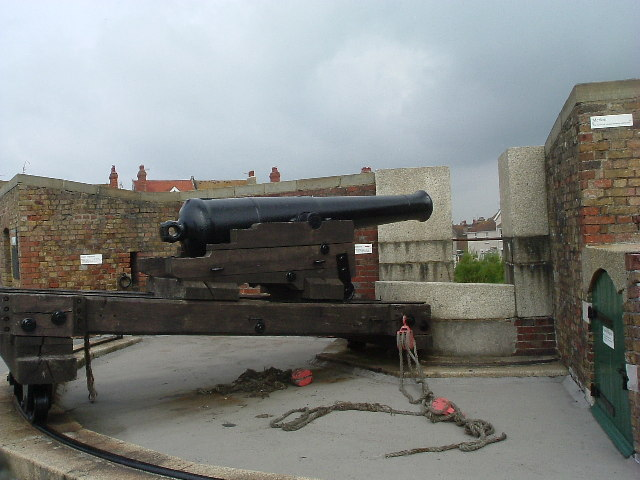
Preserved 32-pounder gun on traversing carriage.

The 4th East Riding AVC competed with other Hull volunteer units for recruits, increasing its establishment in 1877 from eight to twelve batteries with a total of 965 men in 1878. One battery was formed by employees of Messrs Rose, Downs & Thompson (a manufacturer of oilseed crushing machinery), and another from members of the Hull Gymnastic Society. Other units having disappeared, the 4th was renumbered 2nd East Riding Artillery Volunteers in 1881.

The unit leased from Hull Corporation a hall that had been built adjacent to the Corporation Field in Park Street for a working men's exhibition. The government supplied 32-pounder muzzle-loading guns in June 1860. Eight were used for drill purposes at the Hull Citadel and four were placed in a battery built on the Humber Bank adjacent to Earle's shipyard. The unit took part in national gunnery competitions, and won the Queen's Prize on several occasions. From 1886, the coastal artillery batteries were supplemented by minefields, and the 2nd East Riding AV trained with the Humber Division Submarine Miners.

In 1882, the 2nd East Riding AV became part of the Northern Division of the Royal Artillery (later transferring to the Western Division). All Volunteer Artillery units became part of the Royal Garrison Artillery (RGA) in 1899 and in 1902 the unit was redesignated 2nd East Riding Royal Garrison Artillery (Volunteers).

== Territorial Force ==
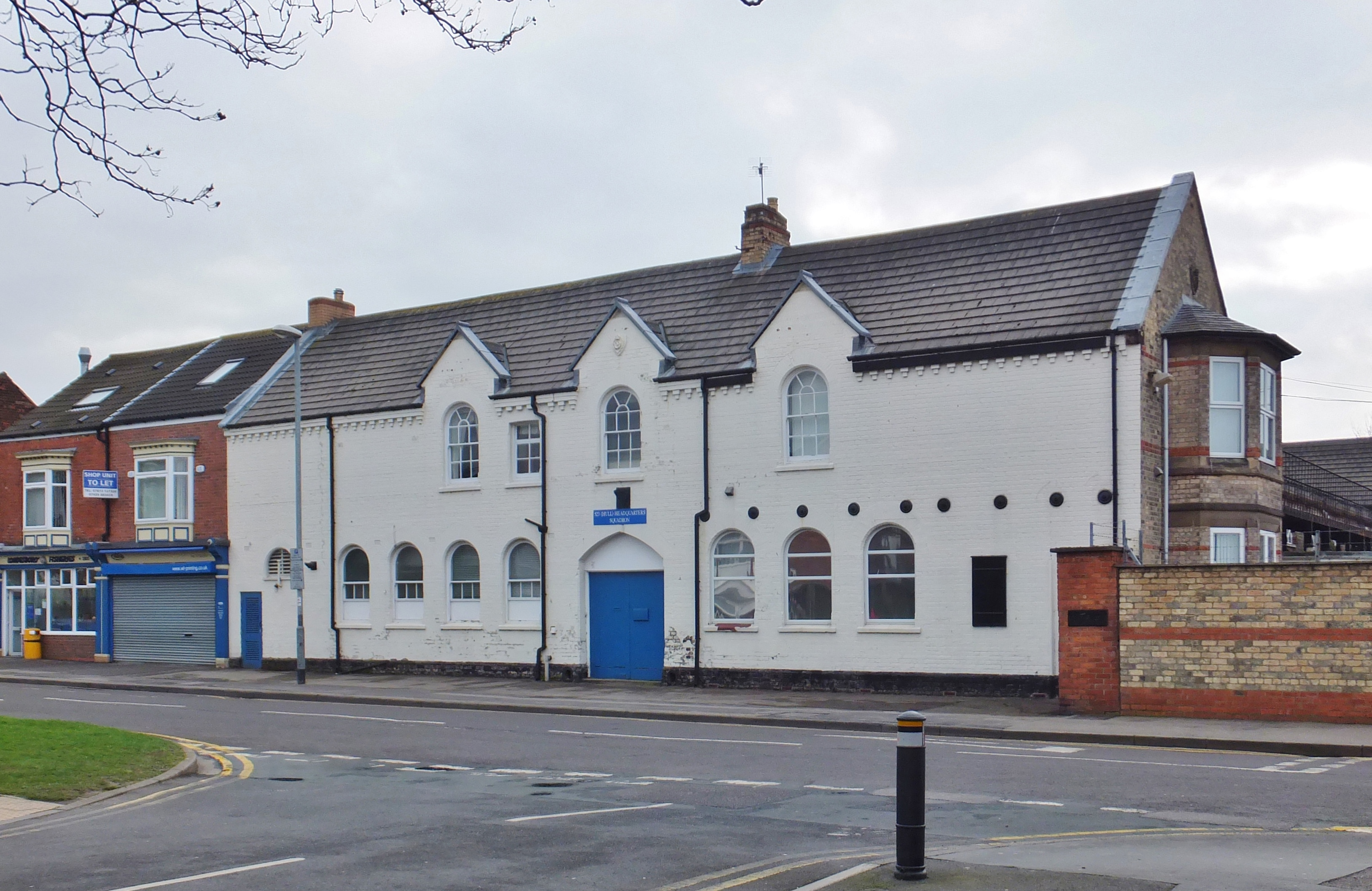
Londesborough Barracks.

With the creation of the Territorial Force by the Haldane Reforms in 1908, the RGA Volunteers were extensively reorganised. In the original plans, the 2nd East Riding RGA would have become the 3rd Northumbrian Brigade in the Royal Field Artillery (RFA). However, these plans were revised in 1910, so that the Hull-based RGA formed two field batteries and an ammunition column in the 2nd Northumbrian Brigade, RFA, and a separate East Riding RGA (ERRGA) with four companies of coast defence artillery.

The East Riding RGA shared Londesborough Barracks in Park Street with the 1st and 2nd East Riding Batteries and the ammunition column of the 2nd Northumbrian RFA and other TF units.

== World War I ==
=== Mobilisation ===
The East Riding RGA's wartime role, together with other TF and Regular RGA units, was to man guns defending major ports on the North East Coast of England. It was responsible for the four 6-inch and four 4.7-inch guns of the Humber defences. During the early part of World War I in the Humber Garrison under No 15 Coastal Fire Command (Spurn Point) and No 16 Coastal Fire Command (Hull).

== Home Defence ==
Although the existing battery at Fort Paull was disarmed as the war progressed, a number of new batteries were established to defend the Humber Estuary, so that by April 1918 the dispositions of the Humber Garrison in Nos 15 and 16 Fire Commands were as follows:

- Sunk Island Battery – 2 × 6-inch Mk VII
- Stallingborough Battery – 2 × 6-inch Mk VII
- Killingholme Battery – 2 × 12-pounder QF
- Green Battery – 2 × 9.2-inch Mk X
- Spurn Point Battery – 2 × 4-inch QF
- Haile Sand Battery – 2 × 4-inch QF
- Godwin's Battery – 2 × 6-inch Mk VII

The ERRGA companies were distributed as follows:

- No 1 Co at Stallingborough
- No 2 Co at Spurn
- No 3 Co at Kilnsea and Spurn
- No 4 Co at Spurn
- No 5 Co – a war-formed unit – at Sunk Island

As the war progressed, RGA coastal units supplied trained manpower to batteries raised for other purposes. The RGA opened a Siege Artillery School in the Humber Garrison and the ERRGA manned 77th and 164th Siege Batteries, RGA, and it appears that by the end of 1916 many of its remaining TF gunners had been mobilised to man anti-aircraft batteries.

=== 77th Siege Battery ===
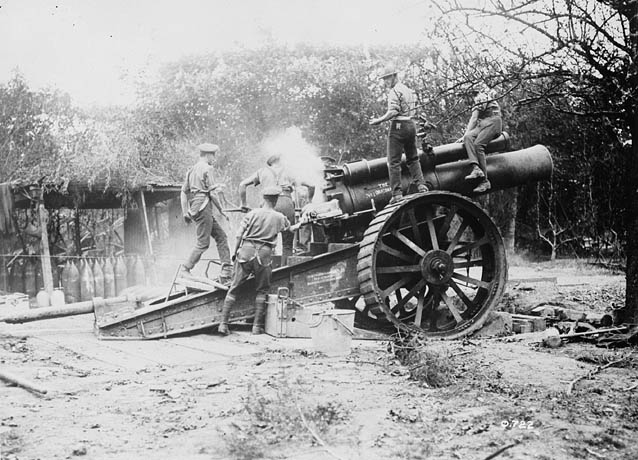
An 8-inch Howitzer in action, September 1916.

In March 1916, 77th Siege Battery was stationed at Fort Borstal in Kent together with 654 Company, Army Service Corps, formed that month to operate the Ammunition Column (Motor Transport) for 77th Siege Bty. The two units entrained for Folkestone, where they embarked on the SS Princess Victoria on 27 March and landed at Boulogne the same day.

On 9 April, the battery and MT company went to Beauval to collect its 8-inch howitzers and the Holt 75 caterpillar tractors to tow them. The battery was posted to 17th Heavy Artillery Group (HAG) in VIII Corps of Fourth Army and began moving to Sailly-au-Bois to dig gun positions, collect ammunition and stores, and move in the guns. On 2 May 1916 it began firing registering shots against targets in its area and later constructed its Observation post (OP). The battery fired 16 rounds against Beaucourt Redoubt on 30 May, only two of which burst properly, reflecting the notoriously unreliable fuzes of the 8-inch shells at that time.

==== Somme ====
77th Siege Battery had been positioned at Sailly to take part in the artillery preparation for the Battle of the Somme. During June the battery was engaged in shoots against targets such as Hawthorn Ridge Redoubt and Beaumont-Hamel, the preliminary bombardment of the German trenches beginning on 6 June. On the First day on the Somme, VIII Corps had one heavy gun for every 44 yards of its attack frontage. 77th Siege Battery joined in the 'general bombardment' that began at 06.00, and then after the infantry 'went over' at 07.30 the guns extended their range in six 'lifts'. 77th 'took part in lifts through Beaumont Hamel, Beaucourt-sur-l'Ancre, Beaucourt Redoubt and finished up at Baillescourt Farm'. Unfortunately, these lifts were premature, the Germans being able to man their trenches once the guns lifted, and the infantry of VIII Corps failed to penetrate much beyond the enemy front line trench. Gunner T. Tharratt, ERRGA, was later awarded the Military Medal (MM) for conspicuous good work as a telephonist and line repairman under heavy shellfire on 1 July.

As the battle continued, 77th Siege Bty concentrated on counter-battery (CB) fire, sometimes directed by aircraft of the Royal Flying Corps. On 14 July the battery commander, Major W.N. Leggett, and his driver were killed when the battery car was hit by a shell. (Note: Major Wilfred Noel Leggett, RGA, killed 14 July 1914, was buried in Martinsart British Cemetery.) After a short period under a temporary commander, Captain C.D. Allderidge, a pre-war officer of the ERRGA, was promoted to take command on 2 August.

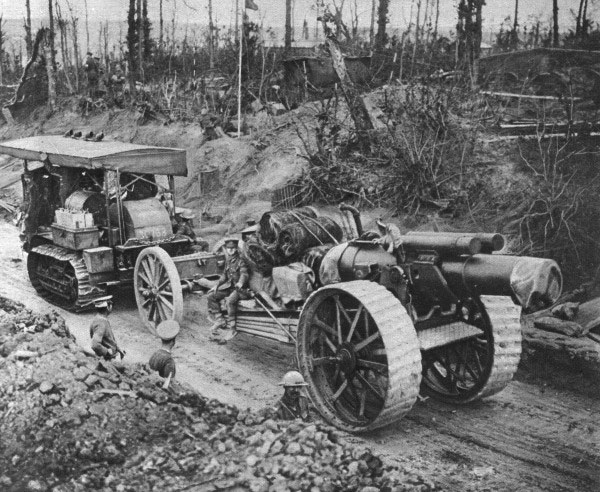
8-inch Howitzer being towed by a Holt 75 caterpillar tractor during the Battle of the Somme, 1916.

During August, the battery remained at Sailly, but it dug new gun pits closer to Hébuterne, which gave it an arc of fire from the sunken lane north of Serre to Thiepval, covering the whole northern sector of the Somme battlefield. After registering new targets, the battery carried out a 'steady bombardment of trenches' on 26 August, and then on 3 September fired a large number of rounds in support of an unsuccessful attack by V Corps along the Ancre. In November, six months after the bombardment began, 77th Siege Bty was still firing at Beaucourt Redoubt.

During the Somme fighting, the battery had been transferred to 4th HAG on 4 July, back to 17th HAG on 12 July, to 16th HAG on 29 July, to 56th HAG (V Corps in Reserve Army) on 14 August, which moved to XIII Corps and then returned to V Corps on 16 October – all without the battery shifting its position from Sailly.

During the winter, 77th Siege Bty moved to 72nd HAG (still in Reserve Army, now designated Fifth Army) on 15 December and then was rested from 15 February 1917 until early March, when it joined 43rd HAG. In February, Lieutenant G.W. Sainsbury was awarded the Military Cross (MC) 'for conspicuous gallantry in action. He displayed great courage and determination while observing under very heavy fire. Later, although wounded, he continued to remain at his post. He has previously done fine work'.

In March 1917, the Germans began a phased retreat to the Hindenburg Line; when they reached the intermediate Bucquoy Line they passed out of range of 77th Siege Bty's howitzers, so on 9 and 10 March they were moved up from Sailly to Hebuterne and opened fire again on 12 March. Soon, however, the Germans had moved many miles out of range.

Acting-Major Allderidge was Mentioned in dispatches in January 1917 and awarded the Distinguished Service Order (DSO) in June 1917.

==== Ypres ====
The British now also reorganised their front, Fifth Army HQ and its Army Troops, including 40th HAG (which 77th Siege Bty joined on 9 July), moving north to the Ypres Salient in preparation for the Third Ypres Offensive. Fifth Army opened the offensive on 31 July with the Battle of Pilckem Ridge, which was preceded by a preliminary bombardment lasting 18 days, during which British batteries suffered badly from CB fire. The attack was generally successful, but the guns had to be moved forward to prepare for the next phase.

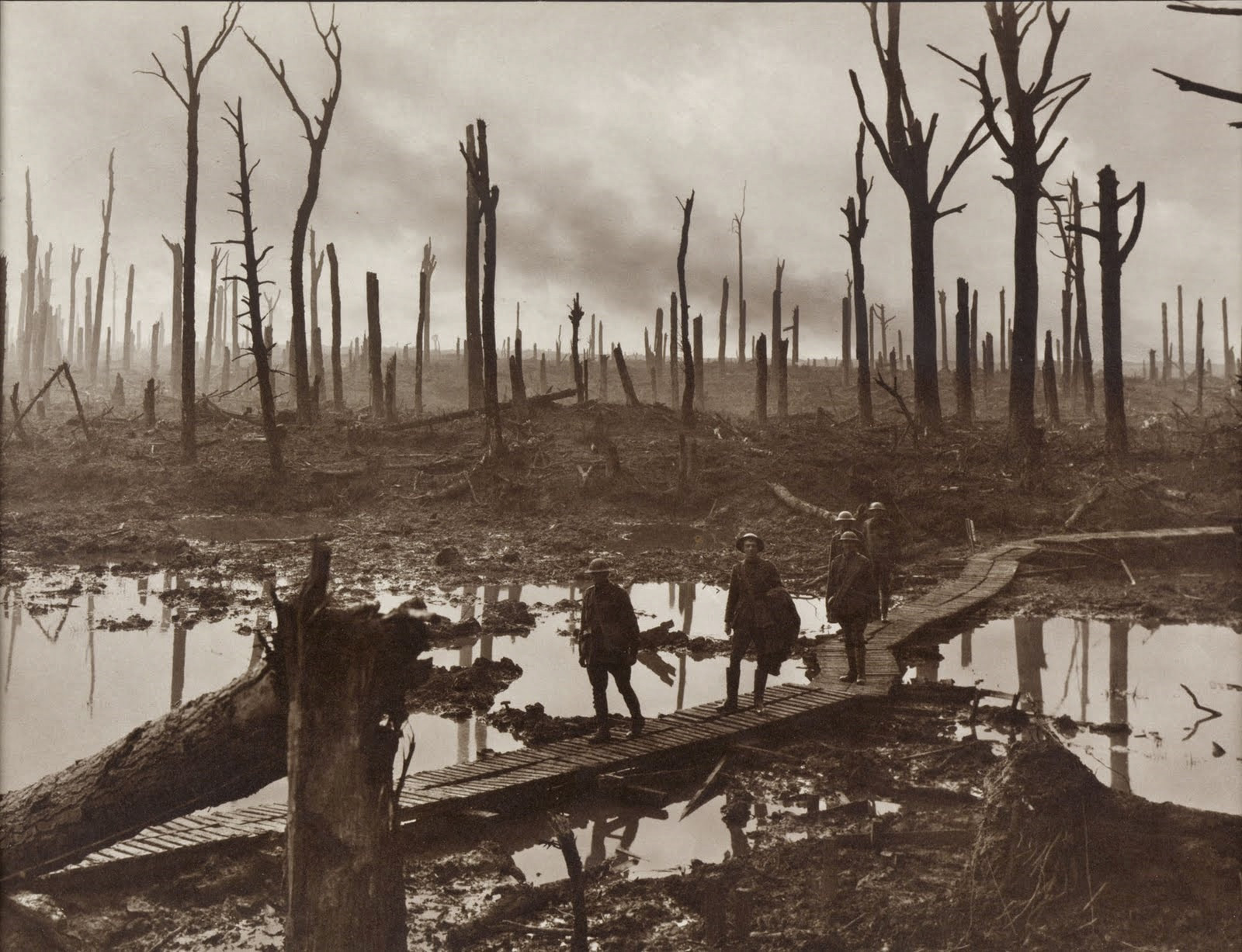
Chateau Wood, near Hooge, 29 October 1917.

77th Siege Bty was transferred to 68th HAG in Third Army on 2 August 1917, then back to 40th HAG with Third Army on 4 September. On 19 September, 40th HAG joined Second Army, which had taken over responsibility for part of the Third Ypres offensive. This included the successful Battle of the Menin Road Ridge (20–25 September), Battle of Polygon Wood (26 September – 3 October), Battle of Broodseinde (4 October) and Battle of Poelcappelle (9 October), all of which were characterised by extremely heavy artillery support.

However, the wet weather and consequent mud was now so bad that it was extremely difficult to move guns and ammunition. The next phases of the offensive (the First (12 October) and Second Battle of Passchendaele (26 October – 10 November)) were disastrous.

On 4 November, 77th Siege Bty was at Hooge engaged in CB work when No 2 gun, a Mk V 8-inch howitzer, was put completely out of action by direct hit from a German 24 cm shell. Again, on 26 November, after the end of the major fighting, 77th Siege Bty lost a number of men killed and wounded from German CB fire.

==== Reorganisation ====
The battery joined 84th HAG in Fourth Army on 14 December, with which (except for a short detachment to 50th HAG later that month) it remained for the rest of the war.

On 16 December 1917, the battery was joined by a section of 218th Siege Bty, bringing it up to a strength of six 8-inch howitzers. 218th Siege Battery had been formed at Plymouth on 31 July 1916. and had arrived in France on 17 January 1917. It had served with various HAGs until December when it was broken up to reinforce other batteries and subsequently re-raised as a 6-inch howitzer unit.

84th HAG became LXXXIV or 84th (Mixed) Brigade, RGA, on 1 February 1918, and joined Third Army on 14 March 1918.

==== Hundred Days Offensive ====
During the Second Battle of Cambrai on 8 October 84th was among the six heavy artillery brigades that supported the attack of VI Corps (2nd and 3rd Divisions), which made an advance of over 300 yards and took about 500 prisoners.

By now the German line was breaking up, and during 10 October, VI Corps ordered Guards Division to continue the pursuit across 8 miles towards the River Selle, supported by cavalry, cyclists, tanks and artillery, including 84th Heavy Bde. Once the Selle was reached, Third Army ordered it to be crossed by a surprise moonlight attack on 20 October without preliminary bombardment but with heavy artillery support once the attack was launched (the Battle of the Selle). Once again, 84th Bde supported VI Corps in this successful attack, the heavy gunners taking care to avoid hitting the town of Solesmes, which was occupied by French civilians.

VI Corps pushed on after its success at the Selle, and on 26 October 84th Bde once again joined the cavalry and cyclists in supporting the pursuit, this time by 3rd Division. During the Battle of the Sambre, the last set-piece battle of the war, 84th Bde was up in support of the attack by 62nd (2nd West Riding) Division.

After the war, 77th Siege Bty was disbanded on 26 October 1919.

=== 164th Siege Battery ===
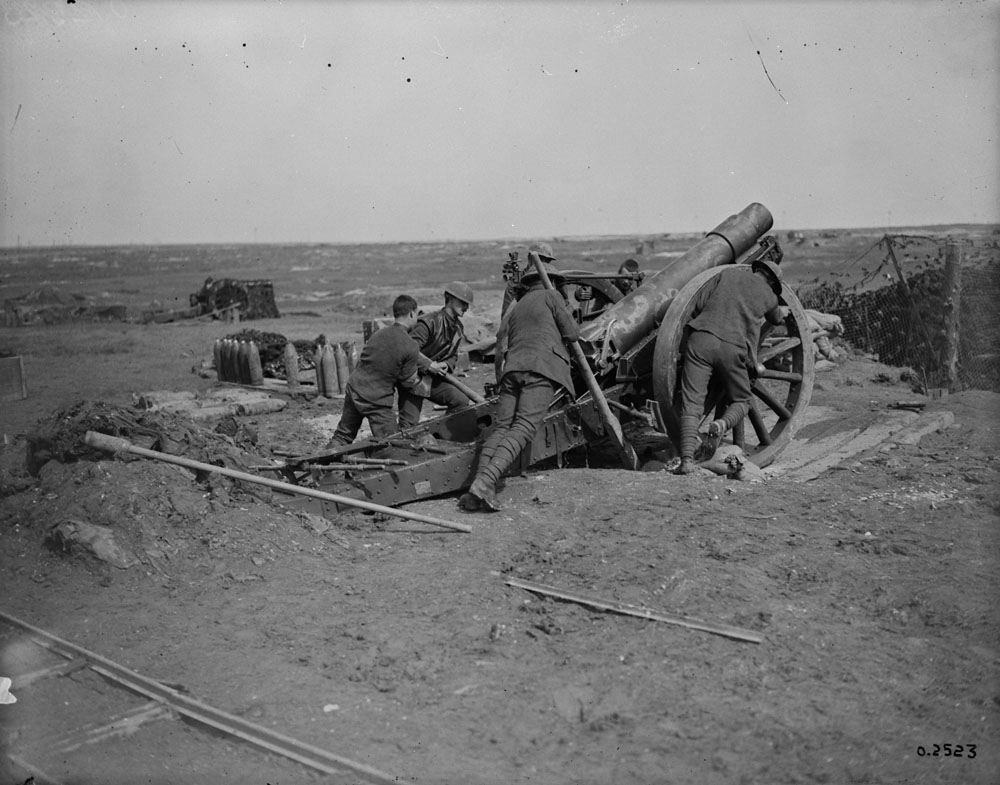
A 6-inch 26 cwt Howitzer in action, February 1918.

164th Siege Battery, RGA, was raised from the Humber Garrison on 23 May 1916, and disembarked in France on 4 September. It was equipped with four 6-inch (26 cwt) Howitzers.

The battery joined 5th HAG with Second Army on 11 September 1916, moving to 1 HAG with Reserve Army on 4 October 1916, during the Battle of the Ancre Heights.

==== Vimy Ridge ====
164th Siege Bty moved to First Army where it was attached to the Canadian Corps from 22 March 1917 (joining 28 March) and to 1st Canadian HAG from 8 April. The artillery preparation for the Battle of Vimy Ridge had begun on 20 March, with the batteries of 1st Canadian HAG firing from behind Bois de Berthonval in 1st Canadian Division's sector. The artillery plan for the heavy guns emphasised counter-battery fire in the days before the assault. Then at Zero hour, while the field guns laid down a Creeping barrage to protect the advancing infantry, the howitzers would switch to laying down a 'standing barrage' on the German support trench. When the creeping barrage reached this line, the standing barrage would then lift onto the phase two objectives (the 'Blue Line'). Once the infantry had achieved their phase two objectives, the field guns would move forward into No man's land and the 6-inch howitzers would move up into their vacated positions to shorten the range to targets deeper behind the German lines. The attack went in on 9 April with Canadian Corps and I Corps successfully capturing Vimy Ridge while Third Army attacked further south near Arras. The only hold-up on 9 April was at Hill 145, near the north end of the Canadian attack, and the capture of this position was completed the next day. Fighting in the southern sector (the Battle of Arras) continued into May.

==== Later war ====
The battery moved again to 64th HAG on 15 April, to 78th HAG (Third, then First Army) on 13 July and to 12th HAG (Third Army) on 7 September. Finally it moved to 52nd HAG in Second Army on 27 September 1917 with which it remained until the Armistice with Germany. The battery was therefore with Second Army during the later stages of the Third Ypres offensive, and remained with it when it was redesignated Fourth Army in December 1917.

On 6 April 1918, 164th Siege Bty was joined by a section of 522nd Siege Bty, bringing it up to a strength of six 6-inch howitzers. (Note: 522nd Siege Battery had been formed in November 1917 and arrived on the Western Front on 2 April 1918.It joined Second Army on 6 April and was immediately broken up to reinforce existing batteries: one section was posted to 15th Siege Bty, the other to 164th.) 52nd HAG (redesignated LII or 52nd Brigade, RGA, from 1 February) moved to First Army on 1 May 1918. Officially, 52nd Brigade was a 9.2-inch Howitzer unit, but in fact three out of its four batteries were equipped with 6-inch howitzers.

52nd Brigade served with Fifth Army from 7 July until the Armistice, taking part in the pursuit to the Scheldt in October 1918, when the 'heavies' were principally employed on harassing fire on the roads used by the retreating enemy and concentrations of fire on HQs and exits from villages.

Postwar, 164th Siege Bty was intended to become C Battery in a new 64th Brigade, RGA, but these plans were scrapped after the Treaty of Versailles and the battery was disbanded.

== Interwar ==
The TF was reconstituted on 7 February 1920, and the ERRGA was reformed, with Nos 1–4 Companies reorganised as two batteries initially titled A & B, then 1 & 2. The TF was reorganised as the Territorial Army (TA) the following year and the unit was redesignated as the East Riding Coast Brigade, RGA, with the two batteries numbered 182 and 183 and Major Allderidge as Adjutant. In 1924, the RGA was subsumed into the Royal Artillery, and the 'Coast Brigades, RGA' became 'Heavy Brigades, RA'. The unit served as coastal defence troops under 50th (Northumbrian) Divisional Area. In 1927, it was decided that the UK's coast defences would be manned by the TA alone.

The RA's heavy brigades were redesignated as regiments on 1 November 1938.

== World War II ==
=== Coast Artillery ===
==== Mobilisation ====
On the outbreak of war, the East Riding Heavy Rgt comprising Regiment Headquarters (RHQ), 182 and 183 Btys mobilised at Hull and formed part of the coastal defences under Northern Command. The Humber Estuary (the Defended Port of Humber) was defined as a Class A Port with defences already in place and the East Riding Heavy Rgt was responsible for manning the following guns:

- 2 × 9.2-inch
- 6 × 6-inch
- 2 × 4.7-inch

After the German invasion of the Low Countries in May 1940 the War Office and the Admiralty agreed a programme of coast defence emergency batteries, which included amongst its highest priorities the installation of two 6-inch Mk VII guns (initially manned by the Royal Navy) at Grimsby on the south side of the Humber Estuary.

In July 1940, while Britain faced the threat of invasion, the East Riding Heavy Rgt expanded to form two regiments:

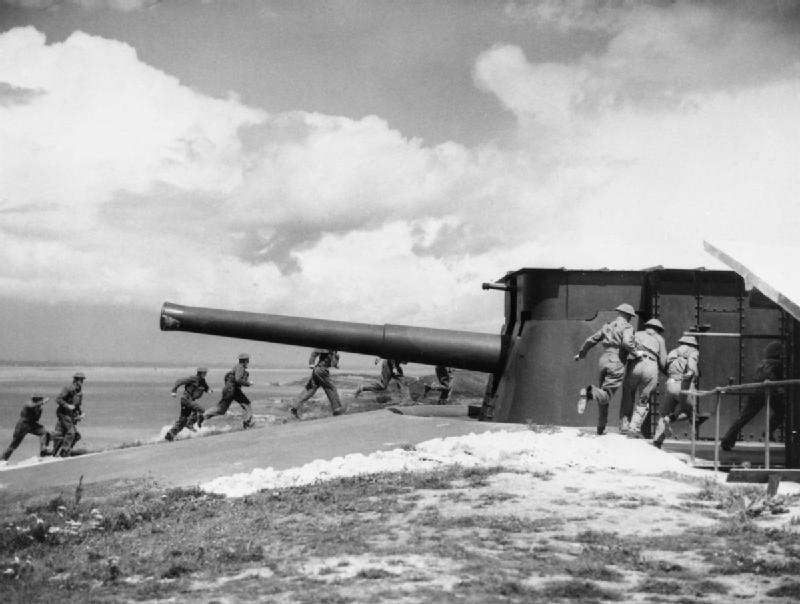
A 9.2-inch coastal defence gun in August 1941.

- 512th (East Riding) Coast Regiment at Spurn Point
- 513th (East Riding) Coast Regiment at Grimsby

Each regiment was initially organised as A and B Btys.

==== Mid-War ====
In June 1941, 7 Coast Artillery Group at Skegness across the Humber was redesignated as 545th Special Coast Rgt; at this point the three regiments had the following organisation:

- 512th (East Riding) Coast Rgt
  - 269, 270 Btys – from A Bty 1 April 1941
  - 271, 272, 273 Btys – from B Bty 1 April 1941
  - 383 Bty – formed at Paull 31 December 1940, at Sunk Island by December 1941
  - 350 Bty – at Hornsea, joined from 6 Coast Artillery Group 1 February 1941
  - 349 Bty – at Filey, joined from 544th Coast Rgt 1 July 1941
  - 193 Bty – at Ringbrough, formed as a 6-inch battery at 72nd Coast Training Rgt 19 June, joined 26 September 1941
  - 64, 65 Coast Observer Detachments – joined by December 1941
- 513th (East Riding) Coast Rgt
  - 274, 275 Btys – from A Bty 1 April 1941
  - 276 Bty – from B Bty 1 April 1941
  - 318 Bty – at Grimsby, formed 10 June 1940, originally from Royal Navy personnel, transferred 31 September 1940
  - 351 Bty – formed at Stallingborough 31 December 1940
  - Coast Artillery Searchlight Detachment formed 11 December 1941
  - 77 Coast Observer Detachment – joined January 1942
- 545th Coast Rgt
  - 319 Bty – at Grimsby
  - 320 Bty – at Filey
  - 321 Bty
  - 30 Coast Observer Detachment – joined January 1942 from 553rd Coast Rgt at Worthing

By the peak of coastal defences, in September 1941, the Humber Estuary had the following guns installed:

- 2 × 9.2-inch
- 6 × 6-inch
- 4 × 4.7-inch
- 3 × 4-inch
- 6 × 6-pounder

In early 1942, these regiments were assigned to I Corps, which commanded both the field forces and coast defences in Yorkshire and Lincolnshire until November 1942, when a new HQ Coast Artillery, East Riding and Lincolnshire District, was established.

Between May and July 1942, the three regiments were completely reorganised:

- 512th (East Riding) Coast Rgt
  - RHQ at Kilnsea in Spurn Head Fire Command by 7 December 1942
  - 269, 271, 272, 273, 274, 275, 276 Btys
  - 193 Bty joined 521st (Kent and Sussex) Coast Rgt at Newhaven on 6 July 1943
  - 100 Bty joined from 521st (K&S) Coast Rgt on 6 July 1943
  - 270 Bty commenced disbandment 10 October, completed by 1 November 1942
  - 65 Coast Observer Detachment
  - 94 Coast Observer Detachment – joined October 1942
- 513th (East Riding) Coast Rgt
- RHQ at Filey by 7 December 1942
  - 349, 350 Btys to 545th Coast Rgt 7 July 1942
  - 320, 383 Btys from 545th Coast Rgt 7 July 1942
  - 64, 77 Coast Observer Detachments
  - 66 Coast Observer Detachment – joined October 1942 from 544th Coast Rgt at Scarborough, North Yorkshire
- 545th Coast Rgt
  - 318, 319, 349, 351 Btys
  - 320, 383 Btys to 513th (ER) Coast Rgt 7 July 1942
  - 349 Bty from 513th (ER) Coast Rgt 7 July 1942
  - 350 Bty from 513th (ER) Coast Rgt 7 July 1942 (at Sunk Island by November 1942)
  - 321 Bty became independent 20 August 1942 (disbanded on 3 February 1944)
  - 437 Bty new battery joined 20 August 1942
  - 30 Coast Observer Detachment
  - 90 Coast Observer Detachment – joined October 1942

==== Late War ====
By late 1942, the threat from German attack had diminished and there was demand for trained gunners for the fighting fronts. A process of reducing the manpower in the coast defences began. 270 and 320 Coast Btys had disappeared from the order of battle before the end of the year, and 350 Bty in April 1943. The regiments guarding the Humber Estuary did, however, receive a number of reinforcements: 316 and 317 Btys joined 513rd (ER) Rgt from 526th (Durham) Coast Rgt in March 1943, a newly formed 445 Bty joined 545th Rgt in June, and 545th also took over 29 Coast Observer Detachment from 526th (Durham) Coast Rgt by November 1943. In March 1944, the East Riding and Lincolnshire Coast Artillery HQ was scrapped, and the regiments came directly under Northern Command.

The manpower requirements for the forthcoming Allied invasion of Normandy (Operation Overlord) led to further reductions in coast defences in April 1944. On 1 April 1944, 513th (ER) Coast Rgt passed into suspended animation (later regarded as having disbanded) and the war-formed 545th Coast Rgt was disbanded; 316, 317 and 320 Btys went to 526th (Durham) Coast Rgt, the remainder (319, 349, 351, 383, 437 and 445) all came under 512th (ER) Coast Rgt; all the attached coast observation detachments were also disbanded. But, by this stage of the war, many of the coast battery positions were manned by Home Guard detachments or in the hands of care and maintenance parties. (Note: As an established TA unit 513rd (ER) Rgt was placed in 'suspended animation', but it was disbanded in 1947.)

=== 617 Infantry Regiment, RA ===
Then, in January 1945, the War Office began to reorganise surplus coastal artillery regiments in the UK into infantry battalions, primarily for line of communication and occupation duties in North West Europe, thereby releasing trained infantry for frontline service. In consequence, 512th Regiment handed its batteries over to 526th (Durham) Coast Rgt and became RHQ of 617 Infantry Regiment, RA in 301st Infantry Brigade. The RHQ details of 512nd Coast Rgt were disbanded on 15 February 1945 and the remaining batteries transferred to 526th (Durham) Coast Rgt

After infantry training in Scotland, 301st Brigade came under the orders of 21st Army Group on 9 May 1945, and landed on the Continent on 15 May (a week after VE Day), where it came under the command of First Canadian Army. Following the end of the war, 617 Regiment carried out occupation duties until it was placed in suspended animation on 31 October 1945.

== Postwar ==
When the TA was reconstituted in 1947, the 512th and 513th Coast Rgts reformed at Hull as 422 (East Riding) Coast Regiment and 423 (East Riding) Coast Regiment respectively. The two regiments formed part of 103 Coast Brigade based at Darlington.

=== 422 (East Riding Coast) Squadron ===
When coastal artillery was abolished in the TA on 31 December 1956, 422 (ER) Coast Rgt transferred to the Royal Engineers as 422 (East Riding Coast) Field Park Squadron at Hull, in 129 Construction Rgt based at Leeds.

The TA was reduced in 1967, and 129 Construction Rgt became 129 (East Riding) Sqn at Hull, joining 72nd (Tyne Electrical Engineers) Rgt. In 1969, the squadron absorbed part of P Bty of The Humber Regiment, RA, lineal successor to the other half of the 2nd East Riding Artillery Volunteers.

Then, in 1977, 129 (ER) Sqn, based at Hull and Goole, transferred to 73 Engineer Rgt based at Bilborough, Nottingham.

In 1991, 73 Engineer Rgt re-roled as an air support unit and 129 (ER) Sqn was broken up: part was absorbed by a Commando Sqn, but part of it went to form 'E' (Humber Artillery) Company in 2nd Battalion Yorkshire Volunteers, recreating the Humber Artillery lineage of the former 2nd East Riding Artillery Volunteers until it was absorbed by another company in 1992.

=== 676 Heavy Anti-Aircraft Regiment ===
The War Office deemed that as 513th Coast Rgt had been disbanded, it was inappropriate for the second Hull regiment to be assigned the number 423, and it had been decided to reduce the number of TA coast regiments. The new regiment was therefore renumbered on 21 February 1948 as 676 (East Riding) Coast Rgt. Shortly afterwards it was converted into 676th (East Riding) Heavy Anti-Aircraft Rgt. In 1954, it was amalgamated with 462nd (Northumbrian) Heavy Anti-Aircraft Rgt, descended from the 2nd East Riding Artillery Volunteers.

== Honorary Colonel ==
The following served as Honorary Colonel of the unit:

- Major A.T. Downs, TD, appointed 13 November 1909
- R. Hall, TD, appointed 20 May 1921
- Brevet-Colonel F. Holman, TD, appointed 2 February 1938

== Memorial ==
In 1960, a memorial plaque was placed in Holy Trinity Church, Hull to mark the centenary of the East Yorkshire Artillery Volunteers. Its full wording is: (Note: '165 Siege Battery' is either an error on the tablet, or a mistranscription in the War Memorials register: authoritative sources confirm that it was 164th Siege Bty that was raised from the Humber Garrison on 23 May 1916, and that 165th Siege Bty was a Canadian unit.)

THIS TABLET WAS PLACED HERE TO MARK THE CENTENARY/ YEAR IN 1960 OF THE FORMATION OF THE EAST YORKSHIRE/ ARTILLERY VOLUNTEERS AND IN RECOGNITION OF THE/ FAITHFUL AND GALLANT SERVICES OF THOSE CITIZENS OF/ KINGSTON UPON HULL AND OTHERS WHO SERVED IN PEACE AND/ WAR AS ARTILLERY MEN IN THE UNDERMENTIONED REGIMENT/ 3RD EAST YORKSHIRE ARTILLERY VOLUNTEERS 2ND EAST YORKSHIRE ARTILLERY VOLUNTEERS 2ND EAST RIDING OF YORKSHIRE/ RGA VOLUNTEERS 2ND NORTHUMBRIAN BRIGADE RFA T.F. EAST RIDING RGA T.F. 77TH SIEGE BATTERY RGA T.F./ 165 SIEGE BATTERY RGA T.F. 251ST BRIGADE T.F. 73RD NORTHUMBRIAN FIELD BRIGADE RA T.A. EAST RIDING HEAVY/ BRIGADE RA T.A. 62ND HEAVY A.A. REGIMENT RA T.A. 422 EAST RIDING COAST REGIMENT RA T.A. 462 MIXED HEAVY/ A.A. REGIMENT RA T.A. 676 A.A. REGIMENT RA T.A. 440 HUMBER LIGHT A.A. REGIMENT RA T.A.
