= Wenlock Barracks =

- Kingston upon Hull
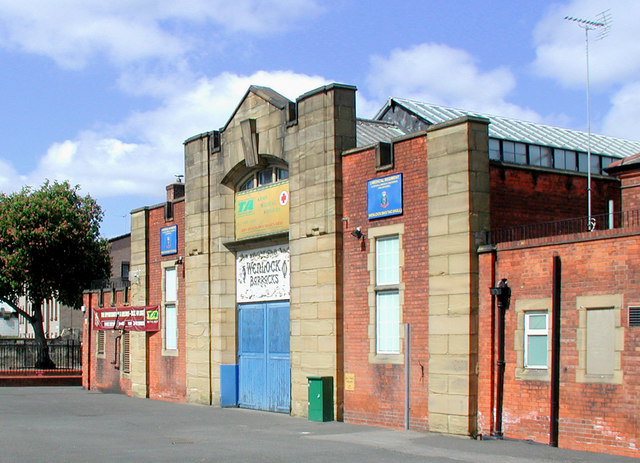
- Wenlock Barracks

Site information
- Type: Drill hall

Location
- Location within East Riding of Yorkshire
- Coordinates: 53.74403°N 0.37546°W

Site history
- Built: 1911
- Built for: War Office
- In use: 1911-Present

Wenlock Barracks is a military installation on Anlaby Road in Kingston upon Hull, England.

== History ==
The building was designed as the headquarters of the 2nd Northumbrian Brigade, Royal Field Artillery and opened in April 1911. The riding school of the East Riding of Yorkshire Yeomanry, which was accessed from Walton Street and had been completed in 1905, formed part of the site. The barracks were named after Lord Wenlock who had been honorary colonel of both 2nd Northumbrian Brigade and the East Riding of Yorkshire Yeomanry. The 2nd Northumbrian Brigade was mobilised at the drill hall in August 1914 and, after being deployed to France and being re-designated 251 Brigade in May 1916, it saw action at the Battle of Passchendaele in autumn 1917, the First Battle of Bapaume in March 1918 and the Second Battle of the Somme in August 1918 as well as the Second Battle of Bapaume later that month.

After the First World War the drill hall became home of 73 (Northumbrian) Regiment Royal Artillery, a formation which evolved to become 62nd (Northumbrian) Anti-Aircraft Brigade Royal Artillery in 1936. The AA Defence Commander (AADC) and Gun Operations Room (GOR) for the Humber Gun Zone (later Gun Defence Area, GDA) were based at Wenlock Barracks during the early part of the Second World War.

The 62nd (Northumbrian) Anti-Aircraft Brigade Royal Artillery evolved to become 462nd (Northumbrian) (Mixed) Heavy Anti-Aircraft Regiment Royal Artillery after the war. The regiment amalgamated with 529 Light Anti-Aircraft Regiment Royal Artillery and 581 (5th Battalion The Royal Lincolnshire Regiment) Heavy Anti-Aircraft Regiment Royal Artillery to form 440th (Humber) Light Anti-Aircraft Regiment Royal Artillery, with its headquarters at Wenlock Barracks, in 1955. Following the defence cuts in 1967, the regiment was reduced to cadre strength sponsored by 250 Field Ambulance Royal Army Medical Corps. The building remains an active Army Reserve Centre and is home to C (250) Medical Squadron, 254 (East of England) Medical Regiment.
