= 301st Infantry Brigade (United Kingdom) =

- Brigade insignia, incorporating crossed cannons in Royal Artillery colours
- Active: 15 January 1945 –
- Country: United Kingdom
- Branch: British Army
- Type: Infantry Brigade
- Role: Lines of Communication
- Engagements: Second World War

The 301st Infantry Brigade was a formation of the British Army organised from surplus Royal Artillery (RA) personnel retrained as infantry towards the end of the Second World War.

== Origin ==
By the end of 1944, 21st Army Group was suffering a severe manpower shortage, particularly among the infantry. At the same time the German Luftwaffe was suffering from such shortages of pilots, aircraft and fuel that serious aerial attacks on the United Kingdom could be discounted. In January 1945 the War Office began to reorganise surplus anti-aircraft and coastal artillery regiments in the UK into infantry battalions, primarily for line of communication and occupation duties in North West Europe, thereby releasing trained infantry for frontline service. The 301st Brigade was the first of seven brigades formed from these new units.

== Order of Battle ==
The 301st Infantry Brigade was formed on 15 January 1945 within Scottish Command from the following Territorial Army RA units:

- 616th Infantry Regiment, Royal Artillery formed by 508th (Tynemouth) Coast Regiment RA (TA)
- 617th Infantry Regiment, Royal Artillery formed by 512th (East Riding) Coast Regiment RA (TA)
- 619th Infantry Regiment, Royal Artillery formed by 524th (Lancashire and Cheshire) Coast Regiment RA (TA)

== Service ==
Brigadier J. Vicary was appointed to command the 301st Brigade on 26 January 1945. After infantry training, the brigade came under the orders of 21st Army Group on 9 May, and landed on the Continent on 15 May (a week after VE Day), where it came under the command of First Canadian Army.

== External sources ==
- The Royal Artillery 1939–45
