= 9/12 =

9/12 may refer to:

- September 12 (month-day date notation)
- December 9 (day-month date notation)
- 9/12 (podcast), hosted by Dan Taberski.
- 9-12 Project, a group created by American television and radio personality Glenn Beck

== See also ==
- 12/9 (disambiguation)
