= 130th Division (Imperial Japanese Army) =

- 第130師団
- Active: 1945–1945
- Country: Empire of Japan
- Allegiance: 23rd army
- Branch: Imperial Japanese Army
- Type: Infantry
- Garrison/HQ: Panyu District
- Nickname: Shoki division
- Engagements: none

The 130th Division (第130師団, Dai-hyakusanjū Shidan) was an infantry division of the Imperial Japanese Army. Its call sign was the Shoki Division (鍾馗兵団, Shoki Heidan). It was formed 12 April 1945 in Daya Bay as a type C(hei) security division, simultaneously with the 129th division. The nucleus for the formation was the parts of the 19th Independent Mixed Brigade.

== Action ==
The 93rd infantry brigade was garrisoning Zhongshan while 94th infantry brigade (organized 5 May 1945) was garrisoning Shantou.

Parts of the 130th division were sent to Shunde District for labour in October 1945. The bulk of 130th division was evacuated back to Japan in March - April 1946, arriving to Tanabe, Wakayama and Kagoshima. The headquarters of the 130th division have departed Port of Humen 26 March 1946, arrived to Uraga, Kanagawa 2 April 1946, and were dissolved 5 April 1946.

== See also ==
- List of Japanese Infantry Divisions
- Independent Mixed Brigades (Imperial Japanese Army)

== Notes and references ==
- This article incorporates material from Japanese Wikipedia page 第130師団 (日本軍), accessed 5 July 2016
- Madej, W. Victor, Japanese Armed Forces Order of Battle, 1937–1945 [2 vols], Allentown, PA: 1981.
