= 129th =

129th may refer to:

== Military units ==
- 129th (Bristol) Heavy Battery, Royal Garrison Artillery, a British Army unit during the First World War
- 129th Duke of Connaught's Own Baluchis, an infantry regiment of the British Indian Army raised in 1846 as the 2nd Bellochee Battalion
- 129th Field Artillery Regiment, a regiment of the Field Artillery Branch of the United States Army
- 129th Illinois Infantry Regiment, an American infantry regiment that served in the Union Army during the American Civil War
- 129th Infantry Brigade (United Kingdom), 1st Line Territorial Army brigade during the Second World War
- 129th Infantry Division (Wehrmacht), an Infantry Division of the German Army during World War II
- 129th Infantry Regiment (United States), a United States military unit of the Illinois National Guard
- 129th Ohio Infantry Regiment (or 129th OVI), an infantry regiment in the Union Army during the American Civil War
- 129th Regiment of Foot, an infantry regiment of the British Army, created in 1794 and disbanded in 1796
- 129th Rescue Squadron, a unit of the California Air National Guard
- 129th Rescue Wing, a unit of the California Air National Guard
- 129th Strategic Reconnaissance Squadron, an inactive United States Air Force unit
- 129th (Wentworth) Battalion, CEF, a unit in the Canadian Expeditionary Force during the First World War

== Other uses ==
- 129th Delaware General Assembly, a meeting of the legislative branch of the Delaware state government
- 129th Kentucky Derby or 2003 Kentucky Derby
- 129th meridian east, a line of longitude across the Arctic Ocean, Asia, Australia, the Indian Ocean, the Southern Ocean and Antarctica
- 129th meridian west, a line of longitude across the Arctic Ocean, North America, the Pacific Ocean, the Southern Ocean and Antarctica
- 129th Ohio General Assembly, the current legislative body of the state of Ohio for 2011 and 2012
- 129th Street station, a station on the IRT Third Avenue Line in the New York City Subway system
- 129th Street (Manhattan), a street in Manhattan
- 129th Toronto Scouting Group in Ontario, Canada
- Pennsylvania's 129th Representative District or Pennsylvania House of Representatives

== See also ==
- 129 (number)
- AD 129, the year 129 (CXXIX) of the Julian calendar
- 129 BC
