= 129th Guards Rifle Division =

- Active: 1943–1946
- Country: Soviet Union
- Branch: Red Army (1943–46)
- Type: Division
- Role: Infantry
- Engagements: Zhitomir–Berdichev offensive Lvov–Sandomierz offensive Battle of the Dukla Pass; Carpathian-Uzhgorod offensive Western Carpathian offensive Moravia–Ostrava offensive
- Decorations: Order of the Red Banner; Order of Suvorov
- Battle honours: Zhitomir

Commanders
- Notable commanders: Maj. Gen. Sergei Mikhailovich Bushev; Maj. Gen. Timofei Ustinovich Grinchenko

The 129th Guards Rifle Division was formed as an elite infantry division of the Red Army in October 1943, based on the 1st formation of the 176th Rifle Division. It was the highest-numbered Guards division designated by the Red Army, although not the last to be formed.

Following the German 17th Army's evacuation of the Kuban bridgehead the Soviet 18th Army, where the 129th Guards was formed, was transferred to 1st Ukrainian Front which was in need of reinforcements during a partly-successful German counteroffensive west of Kiev. The division was instrumental in the re-capture of the city of Zhitomir on December 31, for which it was awarded a battle honor. In the spring it was moved to the 1st Guards Army and remained under that command for the duration of the war. During the Lvov–Sandomierz Offensive the division was transferred to the 107th Rifle Corps and would remain there for the duration; shortly after the 1st Guards Army became part of 4th Ukrainian Front. Under these commands the 129th Guards fought through the Carpathian Mountains into Slovakia and eventually southern Poland and its subunits won several battle honors and decorations in the course of this difficult campaigning, including the Order of Lenin by its artillery regiment. In spite of its fine record of service and many distinctions the division was disbanded in May 1946.

== Formation ==
On October 9, 1943 the 176th officially became the 129th Guards in the 18th Army of North Caucasus Front where it was serving as a separate rifle division; it would be presented with its Guards banner on October 24. Once the division completed its reorganization its order of battle was as follows:

- 320th Guards Rifle Regiment (from 109th Rifle Regiment)
- 325th Guards Rifle Regiment (from 404th Rifle Regiment)
- 330th Guards Rifle Regiment (from 591st Rifle Regiment)
- 299th Guards Artillery Regiment (from 300th Artillery Regiment) (later 327th Guards Artillery Regiment)
- 115th Guards Antitank Battalion
- 110th Guards Reconnaissance Company
- 124th Guards Sapper Battalion
- 127th Guards Signal Battalion
- 119th Guards Medical/Sanitation Battalion
- 113th Guards Chemical Defense (Anti-gas) Company
- 112th Guards Motor Transport Company
- 108th Guards Field Bakery
- 116th Guards Divisional Veterinary Hospital
- 1535th Field Postal Station
- 288th Field Office of the State Bank

The division remained under the command of Maj. Gen. Sergei Mikhailovich Bushev who had been in command of the 176th since November 20, 1942. It inherited the Order of the Red Banner that the 176th had been awarded on December 13, 1942 in recognition of its role in the fighting in the Caucasus, particularly counterattacks against 1st Panzer Army near Mozdok and Ordzhonikidze, as did the 299th Guards Artillery Regiment. In addition, the 320th Guards and 330th Guards Rifle Regiments retained the Orders of the Red Banner that they had been presented under their previous designations on March 27, 1942 and February 8, 1943 respectively.

By the start of November the 129th Guards was under 20th Rifle Corps and on November 19 it was transferred to the Reserve of the Supreme High Command along with the rest of 18th Army and began moving northwest from the Taman Peninsula to the northern Ukraine where it joined the 1st Ukrainian Front west of Kiev on November 30, being reassigned to 22nd Rifle Corps. At about this time the division's personnel were noted as being roughly 60 percent of several Caucasian nationalities and roughly 40 percent Russian.

== Into Western Ukraine ==
1st Ukrainian Front had liberated Kiev on November 6 and had continued its offensive westward toward Fastov, Korosten, Zhitomir and Berdichev; Fastov was taken the following day and Zhitomir fell to 38th Army on November 12. The defending 4th Panzer Army was reinforced by the XXXXVIII Panzer Corps and went over to the counteroffensive, recapturing Zhitomir and Korosten before being halted. The commander of the Front, Army Gen. N. F. Vatutin, appealed for reinforcements and was sent both the 18th Army and 1st Tank Army. Meanwhile, the commander of Army Group South, Field Marshal E. von Manstein, suspended the counteroffensive on December 24, hours before he received news that elements of 1st Tank Army and 1st Guards Army were advancing west on both sides of the Kiev–Zhitomir road. This offensive expanded over the next two days and by early on December 28 18th Army had joined it. While von Manstein wrangled with Hitler over tactics the left flank of 4th Panzer Army was in full retreat west of Korosten and an early 60km-wide gap had opened in its lines north of Zhitomir, which the German forces soon evacuated. In recognition of its role in the re-liberation of the city the division was granted an honorific:

ZHITOMIR... 129th Guards Rifle Division (Major General Bushev, Sergei Mikhailovich)... The troops who participated in the liberation of Zhitomir, by the order of the Supreme High Command of 1 January 1944, and a commendation in Moscow, are given a salute of 20 artillery salvoes from 224 guns.

Through January and February the Front continued trekking westward via Novohrad-Volynskyi, Shepetivka and Rovno, reaching Lutsk and Dubno by March 1. By the beginning of April the 18th Army had only the three divisions of 22nd Corps (161st and 317th Rifle, 129th Guards) under its command.

=== Lvov–Sandomierz Offensive ===
Later that month the 129th Guards was transferred to the 30th Rifle Corps of 1st Guards Army, joining the 141st and 30th Rifle Divisions. The division would remain in this Army for the duration of the war. On June 7 General Bushev advanced to command of 30th Rifle Corps but within weeks took over the 52nd Rifle Corps for the duration. He was replaced by his deputy commander, Lt. Col. Efim Vasilevich Fesenko for several weeks until Col. Timofei Ustinovich Grinchenko took over on July 6; this officer had previously commanded the 276th Rifle Division and would be promoted to the rank of major general on September 13.

When the Lvov-Sandomierz Offensive began on July 13 the 1st Guards Army was deployed on a 118km-wide sector with 17 rifle divisions, of which 5 were in reserve. 30th Corps was roughly in the center of the Army's front, west of the Seret River and east of Pidhaitsi, facing the German 371st Infantry Division. The Army was assigned a supporting role in the offensive, prepared to back up 38th Army to its north with its reserve divisions and the 4th Guards Tank Corps once that Army penetrated the German front.

From July 14-20 the Front's northern armies successfully penetrated the deep German defenses on the Rava-Ruska and Lviv axes and with all available German reserves committed or already destroyed the Front prepared to expand the offensive on the direction of Drohobych. 1st Guards and 18th Armies had been fighting local actions during this first week in order to pin German forces in place while the reserve 107th Rifle Corps and 4th Guards Tanks had shifted to 38th Army's sector to exploit its breakthrough toward Lvov. On the night of July 19/20 forward elements of the 30th and 74th Rifle Corps conducted a reconnaissance-in-force to determine German dispositions; 20 prisoners were taken and on several sectors the forward defenses were penetrated. In order to exploit these successes the forward detachments of 30th Corps, including those of the 129th Guards, went over to the offensive after noon and soon determined that the German forces had begun to withdraw to the west, covered by strong rearguards.

1st Guards Army went over to the general offensive on the morning of July 21 and after dislodging the rearguards advanced from 6-22km during the day. The Army's commander, Col. Gen. A. A. Grechko, was now ordered to develop an aggressive offensive and capture Stanislav by the end of July 24. During July 23 units of 30th Corps forced a crossing of the Dniestr River near Petryluv and fought to expand the bridgehead while driving back German counterattacks. From July 24-26 the Army continued to advance against stubborn resistance and took Stanislav on the 26th. At about this time the 129th Guards was transferred to 107th Corps. In order to prevent any German regrouping in the Drohobych–Borislav region, Grechko was ordered on the morning of the 27th accelerate his drive even further, up to 70km in three days. Despite these directions the advance on Drohobych slowed in the face of a stubborn defense along the Dniestr and repeated counterattacks by tanks and infantry. Effective at 2400 hours on August 5 the 1st Guards Army came under command of 4th Ukrainian Front, where it would remain for the duration. The next day Drohobych was finally liberated and the 330th Guards Rifle Regiment (Lt. Col. Ryabov, Aleksandr Vasilevich) was awarded its name as a battle honor. On August 16 the 320th Guards Rifle Regiment would receive the Order of Bogdan Khmelnitsky, 3rd Degree, while the 124th Guards Sapper Battalion was given the Order of the Red Star, both for their roles in this victory.

== Into the Carpathians ==
4th Ukrainian Front had been transferred from the Crimea following the liberation of Sevastopol to the foothills of the Carpathian Mountains in part because many of its formations, having fought in the Caucasus, were experienced in mountain warfare. The 129th Guards, as the former 176th Rifle Division, had such experience. 107th Corps at the start of September had the 129th Guards, the 167th and 276th Rifle Divisions under command.

Beginning on September 9 the Front attempted to break through the positions of First Panzer Army into the Dukla Pass in the Laborec Highlands toward Uzhhorod. This made slow progress to begin with but by the start of October began to make headway in part due to the removal of a panzer division and on October 6 the pass was taken. By the 14th the Front was on the move again, slowly advancing south of Dukla Pass through German fortified positions; 1st Guards Army was attempting to force some of the smaller passes farther east. In recognition of its part in this fighting, on October 31 the 325th Guards Rifle Regiment would be decorated with the Order of the Red Banner. Through November and into December, as the 2nd and 3rd Ukrainian Fronts encircled Budapest, the 107th Corps pushed on toward the towns of Humenné and Michalovce and on December 16 the 325th Guards Regiment would also receive the Order of Bogdan Khmelnitsky, 2nd Degree, for its role in taking these towns.

=== Western Carpathian Offensive ===
General Grechko launched his Army on its next operation on January 18, 1945 against the German XI Army Corps over the Ondava River through such mountainous terrain that only 42 tanks could be effectively used. The 107th and 11th Rifle Corps heavily damaged the 253rd Infantry Division, throwing back its remnants up to 22km and on January 20 took the city of Prešov; the 320th Guards Rifle Regiment (Col. Fokin, Andrei Petrovich) was recognized with its name as an honorific. For their roles in the same victory on February 19 the 325th Guards Regiment would be awarded the Order of Suvorov, 3rd Degree, while the 330th Guards Regiment received the Order of Bogdan Khmelnitsky, 2nd Degree. On the same date the 115th Guards Antitank Battalion was granted the Order of Bogdan Khmelnitsky, 3rd Degree, for its part in the fighting for Nowy Targ. Near the end of the offensive the division took part in the capture of the city of Bielsko; in an unusual distinction the 299th Guards Artillery Regiment was awarded the Order of Lenin on April 5.

== Moravia–Ostrava Offensive and Postwar ==
The 129th Guards' last offensive began on March 24 into what is now the eastern part of the Czech Republic. The advance crossed the upper reaches of the Oder River but was then held up by German resistance east of Frenštát pod Radhoštěm until April 5. By the time of the German surrender the division was on the approaches to Olomouc; its personnel were now noted as being about 50 percent Russian, 30 percent Ukrainian and 20 percent Bessarabian. On May 28 it was awarded the Order of Suvorov, 2nd Degree, for its part in the capture of Ostrava. The men and women of the division now shared the full title of 129th Guards Rifle, Zhitomir, Order of the Red Banner, Order of Suvorov Division. (Russian: 129-я гвардейская стрелковая Житомирская Краснознамённая ордена Суворова дивизия.) On June 29 Colonel Fokin of the 320th Guards Rifle Regiment would be made a Hero of the Soviet Union. The division was transferred to 38th Army and soon moved to Ternopil where it was disbanded in May 1946 along with the 107th Rifle Corps; General Grinchenko retired from the Red Army in September.
