= 129th Division (Imperial Japanese Army) =

- 第129師団
- Active: 1945–1945
- Country: Empire of Japan
- Allegiance: 23rd army
- Branch: Imperial Japanese Army
- Type: Infantry
- Garrison/HQ: Shilong, Guangdong
- Nickname: Shinbu division
- Engagements: none

Commanders
- Notable commanders: Naonobu Uzawa

The 129th Division (第129師団, Dai-hyakunijūkyū Shidan) was an infantry division of the Imperial Japanese Army. Its call sign was the Shinbu Division (振武兵団, Shinbu Heidan). It was formed 12 April 1945 in Daya Bay as a type C(hei) security division, simultaneously with the 130th division. The nucleus for the formation was the parts of the 19th Independent Mixed Brigade.

== Action ==
14 May 1945, the 91st infantry brigade organization was complete at Huiyang District, and 20 May 92nd infantry brigade was incorporated around Daya Bay, but overall organization was incomplete by the time of surrender of Japan 15 August 1945. The 129th division was expected to counter Allied attack on Hong Kong, but the invasion has failed to materialize.

The 91st brigade of the 129th division has sailed from Port of Humen 2 April 1946 and 12 April 1946, arriving to Uraga, Kanagawa 19 May 1946 and 18 May 1946, respectively. The 92nd brigade of the 129th division has sailed the same route 9 April 1946, arriving to Uraga, Kanagawa 17 May 1946. The disembarkation was delayed until 20 May 1946 because of cholera outbreak on board.

== See also ==
- List of Japanese Infantry Divisions
- Independent Mixed Brigades (Imperial Japanese Army)

== Notes and references ==
- This article incorporates material from Japanese Wikipedia page 第129師団 (日本軍), accessed 5 July 2016
- Madej, W. Victor, Japanese Armed Forces Order of Battle, 1937–1945 [2 vols], Allentown, PA: 1981.
