= 129th Brigade =

129th Brigade may refer to:

- 129th International Brigade, an international unit during the Spanish Civil War fighting for Republican faction
- 129th Infantry Brigade (United Kingdom), a unit of the British Army during the First and Second World Wars
- 129th Heavy Mechanized Brigade, a unit of the Ukrainian Territorial Defense Forces

== See also ==
- 129th Division (disambiguation)
- 129th Regiment (disambiguation)
