= 129th Regiment of Foot =

Infantry regiment of the British Army

The 129th Regiment of Foot was an infantry regiment of the British Army. It was created in 1794 and disbanded in 1796. The regiment was raised at Coventry, and was originally titled the Gentlemen of Coventry's Regiment of Foot, being retitled the 129th a few days later.
