= 129th Ohio Infantry Regiment =

- Active: August 10, 1863, to March 11, 1864
- Country: United States
- Allegiance: Union
- Branch: Infantry
- Engagements: Battle of Cumberland Gap

The 129th Ohio Infantry Regiment, sometimes 129th Ohio Volunteer Infantry (or 129th OVI) was an infantry regiment in the Union Army during the American Civil War.

== Service ==
The 129th Ohio Infantry was organized at Camp Cleveland near Cleveland, Ohio, and mustered in August 10, 1863, for six months service under the command of Colonel Howard D. John.

The regiment was attached to DeCourcy's Brigade, Willcox's Left Wing Forces, Department of the Ohio, to October 1863. 3rd Brigade, 2nd Division, IX Corps, Army of the Ohio, to January 1864. District of the Clinch, Department of the Ohio, to March 1864.

The 129th Ohio Infantry mustered out of service at Cleveland, Ohio, on March 11, 1864.

== Detailed service ==
Moved to Camp Nelson, Ky., August 10. Expedition under DeCourcy to Cumberland Gap, Tenn., August 20-September 8, 1863. Capture of Cumberland Gap September 9. Duty at Cumberland Gap picketing and foraging until December 1. March toward Clinch River December 1–2. Patrol duty along Clinch River until December 29. Moved to Tazewell, then to Cumberland Gap, and duty there until January 11, 1864. Ordered to Camp Nelson, Ky. Skirmish at Barbourville, Ky., February 8. Ordered to Cleveland, Ohio, March 1864.

== Casualties ==
The regiment lost 25 enlisted men during service, all due to disease.

== Commanders ==
- Colonel Howard D. John

== See also ==
- List of Ohio Civil War units
- Ohio in the Civil War
