= Anlaby Road, Kingston upon Hull =

Arterial road and residential district in west Hull, East Riding of Yorkshire, England

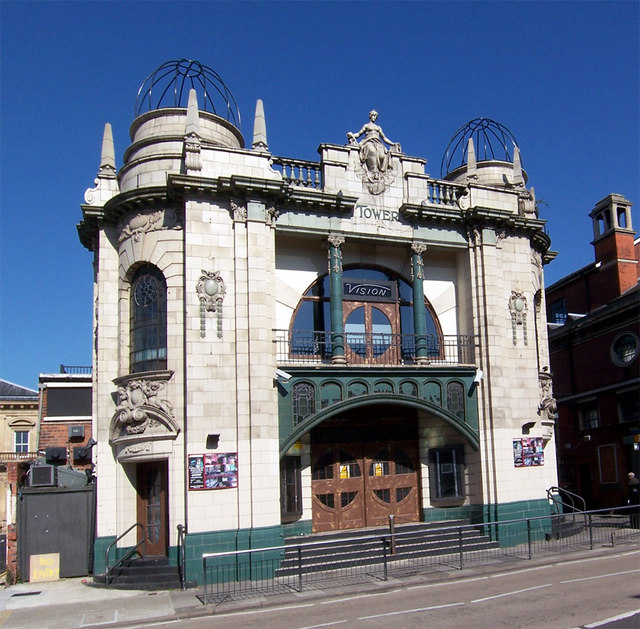
Tower Cinema, Anlaby Road

Anlaby Road is a major arterial road and residential district in west Hull, East Riding of Yorkshire in the north of England. It runs west from the city centre to the city boundary, designated A1105 to its junction with Boothferry Road and then B1231 from there to the city boundary.

== Description ==
Anlaby Road is the site of Hull Royal Infirmary, Hull's main general hospital. It is an ancient route from Hull city centre via Carr Lane and crossing Ferensway leading to the western outer suburbs of Hull and the East Riding of Yorkshire villages of Anlaby, Kirk Ella and West Ella. Once a major Victorian thoroughfare, at its eastern end, it is the backbone of a district of Hull containing a warren of side streets with a high proportion of urban decay and run-down and slum housing in the process of regeneration. Other landmarks are the main depot of East Yorkshire Motor Services Ltd. (EYMS), the local bus and coach operator. The construction of a modern flyover taking traffic over the main railway line greatly altered the character of the area.

Anlaby Road is the home of Hull's Northern Academy of Performing Arts (NAPA). The building itself dates to 1904 and was designed in 1901 by Lanchester, Steward & Rickards, opening in September 1905 as a school of art. The Anlaby Road front has a slightly recessed centre with a pedimented gable containing a mosaic designed by Alfred Garth Jones and executed by the Bromsgrove Guild. Today, NAPA offers classes in musical theatre, drama and dance to young people from 11–19 years of age.

== Tower Cinema ==
The Hull Daily Mail has reported that the former Tower Cinema (see inset), built 1914 is the subject of an appeal by local film enthusiasts for a new owner to restore the building to its former glory.

== See also ==
- Closed cinemas in Kingston upon Hull
