= List of units of the British Army Territorial Force (1908) =

The following is a list of units transferred to the Territorial Force on 1 April 1908, or raised in that year under the terms of the Territorial and Reserve Forces Act 1907, and the associations by which they were administered. The County Association of Rutland did not have charge of any units, but did provide facilities for sub-units of the Leicestershire Yeomanry and the 5th Battalion Leicestershire Regiment. A number of units, particularly those attached to the Royal Garrison Artillery and Royal Engineers, had their titles altered again in 1910.

== Yeomanry ==
Yeomanry regiments formed the cavalry arm of the TF, and were grouped into mounted brigades of three regiments each.

County Association	Unit of the Yeomanry or Volunteers	Unit of the Territorial Force
City of Aberdeen	Scottish Horse (part)	2nd Scottish Horse (part)
Aberdeenshire	Scottish Horse (part)	2nd Scottish Horse (part)
Argyllshire	Scottish Horse (part)	2nd Scottish Horse (part)
Ayrshire	Ayrshire Imperial Yeomanry	Ayrshire (Earl of Carrick's Own) Yeomanry
Bedfordshire	Bedfordshire Imperial Yeomanry (part)	Bedfordshire Yeomanry (part)
Berkshire	Berkshire Imperial Yeomanry	Berkshire Yeomanry
Berwickshire	Lothians and Berwickshire Imperial Yeomanry (part)	Lothians and Border Horse (part)
Buckinghamshire	Buckinghamshire Imperial Yeomanry (Royal Bucks Hussars)	Royal Buckinghamshire Yeomanry (Royal Bucks Hussars)
Cambridgeshire	Suffolk Imperial Yeomanry (part)	Suffolk Yeomanry (The Duke of York's Own Loyal Suffolk Hussars) (part)
Cardiganshire	Denbighshire Imperial Yeomanry (part)	Denbighshire Hussars (part)
Carnarvonshire	Denbighshire Imperial Yeomanry (part)	Denbighshire Hussars (part)
Carmarthenshire	Pembroke Imperial Yeomanry (Castlemartin) (part)	Pembroke Yeomanry (Castlemartin) (part)
Cheshire	Cheshire Imperial Yeomanry	Cheshire Yeomanry (Earl of Chester's)
Cheshire	Denbighshire Imperial Yeomanry (part)	Denbighshire Hussars (part)
Cornwall	Royal 1st Devon Imperial Yeomanry (part)	Royal 1st Devon Yeomanry (part)
Cumberland	Westmorland and Cumberland Imperial Yeomanry (part)	Westmorland and Cumberland Yeomanry (part)
Denbighshire	Denbighshire Imperial Yeomanry (part)	Denbighshire Hussars (part)
Derbyshire	Derbyshire Imperial Yeomanry	Derbyshire Yeomanry
Devonshire	Royal 1st Devon Imperial Yeomanry (part)	Royal 1st Devon Yeomanry (part)
Devonshire	Royal North Devon Imperial Yeomanry	Royal North Devon Yeomanry
Dorset	Dorset Imperial Yeomanry	Queen's Own Dorset Yeomanry
Dumfriesshire	Lanarkshire Imperial Yeomanry (part)	Lanarkshire Yeomanry (part)
Durham	Northumberland Imperial Yeomanry (part)	Northumberland Hussars (part)
City of Edinburgh	Lothians and Berwickshire Imperial Yeomanry (part)	Lothians and Border Horse (part)
Elginshire	Scottish Horse (part)	2nd Scottish Horse (part)
Essex	Essex Imperial Yeomanry	Essex Yeomanry
Fifeshire	Fife and Forfar Imperial Yeomanry (part)	Fife and Forfar Yeomanry (part)
Forfarshire	Fife and Forfar Imperial Yeomanry (part)	Fife and Forfar Yeomanry (part)
Glamorganshire	Glamorganshire Imperial Yeomanry	Glamorganshire Yeomanry
City of Glasgow	Lanarkshire Imperial Yeomanry (Queen's Own Royal Glasgow and Lower Ward of Lanarkshire) (part)	Lanarkshire Yeomanry (Queen's Own Royal Glasgow and Lower Ward of Lanarkshire) (part)
Gloucestershire	Gloucestershire Imperial Yeomanry	Royal Gloucestershire Hussars
Haddingtonshire	Lothians and Berwickshire Imperial Yeomanry (part)	Lothians and Border Horse (part)
Hertfordshire	Hertfordshire Imperial Yeomanry	Hertfordshire Yeomanry
Huntingdonshire	Bedfordshire Imperial Yeomanry (part)	Bedfordshire Yeomanry (part)
Inverness-shire	Lovat's Scouts (part)	1st Lovat Scouts
Inverness-shire	Lovat's Scouts (part)	2nd Lovat Scouts (part)
Kent	Royal East Kent Imperial Yeomanry	Royal East Kent Yeomanry (The Duke of Connaught's Own)
Kent	West Kent Imperial Yeomanry	Queen's Own West Kent Yeomanry
Lanarkshire	Lanarkshire Imperial Yeomanry (part)	Lanarkshire Yeomanry (part)
Lanarkshire	Lanarkshire Imperial Yeomanry (Queen's Own Royal Glasgow and Lower Ward of Lanarkshire) (part)	Lanarkshire Yeomanry (Queen's Own Royal Glasgow and Lower Ward of Lanarkshire) (part)
Lancashire	Duke of Lancaster's Own Imperial Yeomanry	The Duke of Lancaster's Own Yeomanry
Lancashire	Lancashire Hussars Imperial Yeomanry	Lancashire Hussars Yeomanry
Leicestershire	Leicestershire Imperial Yeomanry	Leicestershire Yeomanry (Prince Albert's Own)
Lincolnshire	Lincolnshire Imperial Yeomanry	Lincolnshire Yeomanry
City of London	City of London Imperial Yeomanry	The City of London Yeomanry (Rough Riders)
County of London	King's Colonials	The King's Colonials
County of London	Middlesex Imperial Yeomanry	1st County of London Yeomanry (Middlesex, The Duke of Cambridge's Hussars)
County of London	2nd County of London Imperial Yeomanry	2nd County of London Yeomanry (Westminster Dragoons)
County of London	3rd County of London Imperial Yeomanry	3rd County of London Yeomanry (Sharpshooters)
Montgomeryshire	Montgomeryshire Imperial Yeomanry (part)	Montgomeryshire Yeomanry (part)
Norfolk	Norfolk Imperial Yeomanry	Norfolk Yeomanry (The King's Own Royal Regiment)
Northamptonshire	Northamptonshire Imperial Yeomanry	Northamptonshire Yeomanry
Northumberland	Northumberland Imperial Yeomanry (part)	Northumberland Hussars (part)
Nottinghamshire	Nottinghamshire Imperial Yeomanry (Sherwood Rangers)	Nottinghamshire Yeomanry (Sherwood Rangers)
Nottinghamshire	Nottinghamshire Imperial Yeomanry (South Nottinghamshire Hussars)	Nottinghamshire Yeomanry (South Nottinghamshire Hussars)
Oxfordshire	Oxfordshire Imperial Yeomanry	Queen's Own Oxfordshire Hussars
Pembrokeshire	Pembroke Imperial Yeomanry (Castlemartin) (part)	Pembroke Yeomanry (Castlemartin) (part)
Perthshire	Scottish Horse (part)	1st Scottish Horse
Radnorshire	Montgomeryshire Imperial Yeomanry (part)	Montgomeryshire Yeomanry (part)
Ross and Cromarty	Lovat's Scouts (part)	2nd Lovat Scouts (part)
Shropshire	Shropshire Imperial Yeomanry	Shropshire Yeomanry (Dragoons)
Somersetshire	North Somerset Imperial Yeomanry	North Somerset Yeomanry
Somersetshire	West Somerset Imperial Yeomanry	West Somerset Yeomanry
Southampton	Hampshire Imperial Yeomanry	Hampshire Yeomanry (Carabiniers)
Staffordshire	Staffordshire Imperial Yeomanry	Staffordshire Yeomanry (Queen's Own Royal Regiment)
Suffolk	Suffolk Imperial Yeomanry (part)	Suffolk Yeomanry (Duke of York's Own Loyal Suffolk Hussars) (part)
Surrey	Surrey Imperial Yeomanry	Surrey Yeomanry (Princess of Wales's)
Sussex	Sussex Imperial Yeomanry	Sussex Yeomanry
Sutherlandshire	Lovat's Scouts (part)	2nd Lovat Scouts (part)
Warwickshire	Warwickshire Imperial Yeomanry	Warwickshire Yeomanry
Westmorland	Westmorland and Cumberland Imperial Yeomanry (part)	Westmorland and Cumberland Yeomanry (part)
Wiltshire	Royal Wiltshire Imperial Yeomanry (Prince of Wales's Own Royal Regiment)	Royal Wiltshire Yeomanry (Prince of Wales's Own Royal Regiment)
Worcestershire	Worcestershire Imperial Yeomanry	Queen's Own Worcestershire Hussars
East Riding of Yorkshire	East Riding of Yorkshire Imperial Yeomanry	East Riding of Yorkshire Yeomanry
North Riding of Yorkshire	Yorkshire Hussars Imperial Yeomanry (Alexandra, Princess of Wales's Own) (part)	Yorkshire Hussars (Alexandra, Princess of Wales's Own) (part)
West Riding of Yorkshire	Yorkshire Hussars Imperial Yeomanry (Alexandra, Princess of Wales's Own) (part)	Yorkshire Hussars (Alexandra, Princess of Wales's Own) (part)
West Riding of Yorkshire	Yorkshire Dragoons Imperial Yeomanry (Queen's Own)	Queen's Own Yorkshire Dragoons

== Royal Horse Artillery ==
Royal Horse Artillery units formed artillery support to the mounted brigades. Most of the batteries were newly raised in 1908.

County Association	Unit of the Volunteers	Unit of the Territorial Force
Ayrshire	Raised 1908	Ayrshire Battery, Royal Horse Artillery
Berkshire	Raised 1908	Berkshire Battery, Royal Horse Artillery
City of London†	Honourable Artillery Company (part)	1st City of London Horse Artillery Battery, HAC; 2nd City of London Horse Artillery Battery, HAC
Essex	Raised 1908	Essex Battery, Royal Horse Artillery
Glamorganshire	2nd Volunteer Battalion, The Welsh Regiment (part)	Glamorganshire Battery, Royal Horse Artillery
Inverness-shire	Raised 1908	Inverness-shire Battery, Royal Horse Artillery
Leicestershire	Raised 1908	Leicestershire Battery, Royal Horse Artillery
Nottinghamshire	Raised 1908	Nottinghamshire Battery, Royal Horse Artillery
Shropshire	1st Shropshire and Staffordshire Royal Garrison Artillery (Volunteers) (part)	Shropshire Battery, Royal Horse Artillery
Somersetshire	Raised 1908	Somerset Battery, Royal Horse Artillery
Southampton	Raised 1909	Hampshire Battery, Royal Horse Artillery
Wiltshire††	Proposed 1908	Wiltshire Battery, Royal Horse Artillery
Warwickshire	Raised 1908	Warwickshire Battery, Royal Horse Artillery
West Riding of Yorkshire	Raised 1908	West Riding Battery, Royal Horse Artillery

†The HAC had its property and privileges protected by the Honourable Artillery Company Act 1908.
††On 18 March 1908, Wiltshire RHA was proposed to be raised as a new unit. However, poor recruiting led to a change in plans and the Hampshire RHA was raised in 1909 instead.

== Royal Field Artillery ==
Royal Field Artillery brigades formed parts of each territorial division, and were mobile and equipped with medium calibre ordnance.

County Association	Unit of the Volunteers	Unit of the Territorial Force
City of Aberdeen	1st Aberdeenshire Royal Garrison Artillery (Volunteers) (part)	2nd Highland Brigade (part) (actually formed 1st Highland Brigade (part))
Ayrshire	1st Ayrshire and Galloway Royal Garrison Artillery (Volunteers) (part)	3rd Lowland Brigade (part) (actually formed 2nd Lowland Brigade (part))
Banffshire	1st Banffshire Royal Garrison Artillery (Volunteers) (part)	1st Highland Brigade (part)
Cheshire	1st Cheshire Royal Garrison Artillery (Volunteers)	3rd Welsh Brigade (Cheshire Brigade from 1913)
Cumberland	1st Cumberland Royal Garrison Artillery (Volunteers)	4th East Lancashire Brigade (The Cumberland Artillery)
Derbyshire		4th North Midland (Howitzer) Brigade raised 1908
Devonshire	1st Devonshire Royal Garrison Artillery (Volunteers)	3rd Wessex Brigade (part) (actually formed 4th Wessex Brigade)
Dorsetshire	1st Dorsetshire Royal Garrison Artillery (Volunteers)	3rd Wessex Brigade (part)
City of Dundee	1st Forfarshire Royal Garrison Artillery (Volunteers) (part)	1st Highland Brigade (part) (actually formed 2nd Highland Brigade (part))
Durham	1st Durham Royal Garrison Artillery (Volunteers) (part) 2nd Durham Royal Garrison Artillery (Volunteers)	1st Northumbrian Brigade
Durham	3rd Durham Royal Garrison Artillery (Volunteers)	4th Northumbrian (County of Durham) (Howitzer) Brigade (part)
Durham	1st Newcastle upon Tyne Royal Garrison Artillery (Volunteers) (part)	4th Northumbrian (Howitzer) Brigade (part)
City of Edinburgh	1st Midlothian Royal Garrison Artillery (Volunteers) (part)	1st Lowland Brigade
Essex	1st Essex Royal Garrison Artillery (Volunteers) (part)	1st East Anglian Brigade (changed to 2nd East Anglian Brigade)
Fife	1st Fifeshire Royal Garrison Artillery (Volunteers) (part)	2nd Highland Brigade (part)
Forfarshire	1st Forfarshire Royal Garrison Artillery (Volunteers) (part)	1st Highland Brigade (part) (actually formed 2nd Highland Brigade (part))
Glamorganshire	2nd Volunteer Battalion, The Welsh Regiment (part)	2nd Welsh Brigade
Glamorganshire	1st Glamorganshire Royal Garrison Artillery (Volunteers)	1st Welsh Brigade
City of Glasgow	1st Lanarkshire Royal Garrison Artillery (Volunteers)	1st Lowland Brigade (actually formed 3rd Lowland Brigade)
City of Glasgow	1st Lanarkshire Royal Garrison Artillery (Volunteers)	4th Lowland (Howitzer) Brigade
Gloucestershire	1st Gloucestershire (Gloucester and Somerset) Royal Garrison Artillery (Volunteers)	2nd South Midland Brigade (actually formed 1st South Midland Brigade)
Hertfordshire	1st (Hertfordshire) Volunteer Battalion, The Bedfordshire Regiment (part) 2nd (Hertfordshire) Volunteer Battalion, The Bedfordshire Regiment (part)	4th East Anglian Brigade (part)
Kent	1st Cinque Ports Royal Garrison Artillery (Volunteers)	1st Home Counties Brigade (actually formed 3rd Home Counties (Cinque Ports) Brigade) (4th Home Counties (Howitzer) Brigade also raised in Kent in 1908)
Kirkcudbrightshire	1st Ayrshire and Galloway Royal Garrison Artillery (Volunteers) (part)	3rd Lowland Brigade (part) (actually formed 2nd Lowland Brigade (part))
Lancashire	2nd Lancashire Royal Garrison Artillery (Volunteers)	1st West Lancashire Brigade
Lancashire	3rd Lancashire Royal Garrison Artillery (Volunteers)	1st East Lancashire Brigade
Lancashire	4th Lancashire Royal Garrison Artillery (Volunteers)	4th West Lancashire (Howitzer) Brigade
Lancashire	5th Lancashire Royal Garrison Artillery (Volunteers)	2nd West Lancashire Brigade
Lancashire	6th Lancashire Royal Garrison Artillery (Volunteers)	3rd West Lancashire Brigade
Lancashire	7th Lancashire (The Manchester Artillery) Royal Garrison Artillery (Volunteers)	2nd East Lancashire Brigade
Lancashire	9th Lancashire Royal Garrison Artillery (Volunteers)	3rd East Lancashire Brigade (The Bolton Artillery)
Lincolnshire	1st Lincolnshire Royal Garrison Artillery (Volunteers)	1st North Midland Brigade
City of London	1st City of London Royal Garrison Artillery (Volunteers) (part)	1st City of London Brigade
County of London	1st City of London Royal Garrison Artillery (Volunteers) (part)	6th County of London Brigade
County of London	1st City of London Royal Garrison Artillery (Volunteers) (part)	7th County of London Brigade
County of London	3rd Kent (Royal Arsenal) Royal Garrison Artillery (Volunteers)	2nd County of London Brigade
County of London	2nd Middlesex Royal Garrison Artillery (Volunteers)	3rd County of London Brigade
County of London	2nd Kent Royal Garrison Artillery (Volunteers) (part)	4th County of London (Howitzer) Brigade
County of London	3rd Middlesex Royal Garrison Artillery (Volunteers)	5th County of London Brigade
County of London	2nd Kent Royal Garrison Artillery (Volunteers) (part)	8th County of London (Howitzer) Brigade
Midlothian	1st Midlothian Royal Garrison Artillery (Volunteers) (part)	2nd Lowland Brigade (part)
Monmouthshire	1st Monmouthshire Royal Garrison Artillery (Volunteers)	4th Welsh Brigade
Norfolk	1st Norfolk Royal Garrison Artillery (Volunteers) (part)	2nd East Anglian Brigade (changed to 1st East Anglian Brigade)
Northamptonshire	1st Volunteer Battalion, The Northamptonshire Regiment (part)	4th East Anglian Brigade (part)
Northumberland	1st Newcastle upon Tyne Royal Garrison Artillery (Volunteers) (part) 1st Northumberland Royal Garrison Artillery (Volunteers)	2nd Northumbrian Brigade
Renfrewshire	1st Renfrew and Dumbarton Royal Garrison Artillery (Volunteers) (part)	3rd Highland (Howitzer) Brigade
Shropshire	1st Shropshire and Staffordshire Royal Garrison Artillery (Volunteers) (part)	2nd North Midland Brigade (part)
Southampton	2nd Hampshire Royal Garrison Artillery (Volunteers)	1st Wessex Brigade
Southampton	2nd Hampshire Royal Garrison Artillery (Volunteers)	2nd Wessex (Howitzer) Brigade
Staffordshire	1st Shropshire and Staffordshire Royal Garrison Artillery (Volunteers) (part)	2nd North Midland Brigade (part)
Staffordshire		(3rd North Midland Brigade raised 1908)
Suffolk	1st Norfolk Royal Garrison Artillery (Volunteers) (part)	3rd East Anglian (Howitzer) Brigade
Sussex	1st Sussex Royal Garrison Artillery (Volunteers)	2nd Home Counties Brigade (actually formed 1st)
Sussex	2nd Sussex Royal Garrison Artillery (Volunteers)	3rd Home Counties Brigade (actually formed part of 2nd)
Sussex	2nd Cinque Ports Royal Garrison Artillery (Volunteers)	2nd Home Counties Brigade (part)
Warwickshire	1st Warwickshire Royal Garrison Artillery (Volunteers)	3rd South Midland Brigade (4th South Midland (Howitzer) Brigade also raised in Warwickshire in 1908)
Wigtownshire	1st Ayrshire and Galloway Royal Garrison Artillery (Volunteers) (part)	3rd Lowland Brigade (part) (actually formed 2nd Lowland Brigade (part))
Worcestershire	1st Worcestershire Royal Garrison Artillery (Volunteers)	2nd South Midland Brigade
East Riding of Yorkshire	2nd East Riding of Yorkshire Royal Garrison Artillery (Volunteers)	3rd Northumbrian Brigade (actually formed 2nd Northumbrian Brigade)
West Riding of Yorkshire	1st West Riding Royal Garrison Artillery (Volunteers)	1st West Riding Brigade
West Riding of Yorkshire	2nd West Riding Royal Garrison Artillery (Volunteers)	2nd West Riding Brigade
West Riding of Yorkshire	4th West Riding Royal Garrison Artillery (Volunteers)	3rd West Riding Brigade
West Riding of Yorkshire	2nd (Leeds) Yorkshire (West Riding) Royal Engineers (Volunteers)	4th West Riding (Howitzer) Brigade

== Royal Garrison Artillery ==
Royal Garrison Artillery units of the TF were "defended ports" units guarding coastal facilities, with the exception of the 4th Highland Brigade, which was equipped as mountain artillery.

County Association	Unit of the Volunteers	Unit of the Territorial Force
City of Aberdeen	1st Aberdeenshire Royal Garrison Artillery (Volunteers) (part)	North Scottish Royal Garrison Artillery (part)
Argyllshire	1st Argyll and Bute Royal Garrison Artillery (Volunteers) (part)	Forth and Clyde Royal Garrison Artillery (part)
Argyllshire	1st Argyll and Bute Royal Garrison Artillery (Volunteers) (part)	4th Highland (Mountain) Brigade Royal Garrison Artillery (part)
Carnarvonshire	1st Carnarvonshire Royal Garrison Artillery (Volunteers) (part)	Welsh (Carnarvonshire) Royal Garrison Artillery
Cornwall	1st Cornwall Royal Garrison Artillery (part)	Devon and Cornwall Royal Garrison Artillery (part) (actually formed Cornwall (Duke of Cornwall's) Royal Garrison Artillery)
Devonshire	2nd Devonshire Royal Garrison Artillery (Volunteers)	Devonshire Royal Garrison Artillery
Devonshire	2nd Devonshire Royal Garrison Artillery (Volunteers)	Devon and Cornwall Royal Garrison Artillery (part) (not formed)
Dorsetshire	1st Dorsetshire Royal Garrison Artillery (Volunteers) (part)	Hants and Dorset Royal Garrison Artillery (part) (soon split into separate Dorset and Hampshire units)
Durham	4th Durham Royal Garrison Artillery (Volunteers)	Durham and Yorkshire Royal Garrison Artillery (part)
City of Edinburgh	1st Edinburgh Royal Garrison Artillery (Volunteers) (part)	Lowland (City of Edinburgh) Royal Garrison Artillery
Essex	1st Essex Royal Garrison Artillery (Volunteers) (part)	Essex and Suffolk Royal Garrison Artillery (part)
Essex	1st Essex Royal Garrison Artillery (Volunteers) (part)	East Anglian (Essex) Royal Garrison Artillery
Fife	1st Fife Royal Garrison Artillery (Volunteers) (part)	North Scottish Royal Garrison Artillery (part)
Forfarshire	1st Forfarshire Royal Garrison Artillery (Volunteers) (part)	North Scottish Royal Garrison Artillery (part)
Glamorganshire	2nd Glamorganshire Royal Garrison Artillery (Volunteers)	Glamorgan and Pembroke Royal Garrison Artillery (soon split into separate Glamorgan and Pembroke units)
Inverness-shire	Highland Royal Garrison Artillery (Volunteers) (part)	North Scottish Royal Garrison Artillery (part)
Kent	1st Kent Royal Garrison Artillery (Volunteers)	Kent and Sussex Royal Garrison Artillery (part)
Kent	1st Kent Royal Garrison Artillery (Volunteers)	Home Counties (Kent) Royal Garrison Artillery
Lancashire	1st Lancashire Royal Garrison Artillery (Volunteers)	Lancashire and Cheshire Royal Garrison Artillery
Lancashire	8th Lancashire Royal Garrison Artillery (Volunteers)	1st Lancashire Heavy Battery, Lancashire Heavy Brigade
Lancashire	8th Lancashire Royal Garrison Artillery (Volunteers)	2nd Lancashire Heavy Battery, Lancashire Heavy Brigade
County of London	1st London Royal Engineers (Volunteers)	1st London Heavy Battery, London Heavy Brigade
County of London	1st London Royal Engineers (Volunteers)	2nd London Heavy Battery, London Heavy Brigade
Northumberland	Tynemouth Royal Garrison Artillery (Volunteers)	Tynemouth Royal Garrison Artillery (TF)
Orkney	1st Orkney Royal Garrison Artillery (Volunteers)	Orkney Royal Garrison Artillery
Renfrewshire	1st Renfrew and Dumbarton Royal Garrison Artillery (Volunteers)	Forth and Clyde Royal Garrison Artillery (part)
Suffolk	1st Suffolk and Harwich Royal Garrison Artillery (Volunteers)	Essex and Suffolk Royal Garrison Artillery (part)
Southampton	1st Hampshire Royal Garrison Artillery (Volunteers)	Hants and Dorset Royal Garrison Artillery (part) (soon split into separate Dorset and Hampshire units)
Southampton	2nd Hampshire Royal Garrison Artillery (Volunteers) (part)	Wessex (Hampshire) Royal Garrison Artillery (actually formed Wessex (Hampshire) Heavy Battery)
Sussex	1st Sussex Royal Garrison Artillery (Volunteers) (part)	Kent and Sussex Royal Garrison Artillery (part)
East Riding of Yorkshire	1st East Riding of Yorkshire Royal Garrison Artillery (Volunteers) (part)	Durham and Yorkshire Royal Garrison Artillery (part)
East Riding of Yorkshire	1st East Riding of Yorkshire Royal Garrison Artillery (Volunteers) (part)	West Riding Royal Garrison Artillery
East Riding of Yorkshire	2nd East Riding of Yorkshire Royal Garrison Artillery (Volunteers)	2nd Northumbrian Brigade, Royal Field Artillery
North Riding of Yorkshire	1st North Riding of Yorkshire Royal Garrison Artillery (Volunteers)	Northumbrian (North Riding) Royal Garrison Artillery

== Royal Engineers ==
Each division of the TF was supported by two field companies and a telegraph company of the Royal Engineers. In addition there were a number of fortress units consisting of works and electric lights companies, providing coastal defence.

County Association	Unit of the Volunteers	Unit of the Territorial Force
City of Aberdeen	1st Aberdeenshire Royal Engineers (Volunteers)	City of Aberdeen (Fortress) Royal Engineers (No.1 Fortress Works Company)
City of Aberdeen	1st Aberdeenshire Royal Engineers (Volunteers)	1st Highland Field Company
City of Aberdeen	1st Aberdeenshire Royal Engineers (Volunteers)	Highland Divisional Telegraph Company
Bedfordshire	1st Bedfordshire Royal Engineers (Volunteers)	1st East Anglian Field Company
Bedfordshire	1st Bedfordshire Royal Engineers (Volunteers)	2nd East Anglian Field Company
Bedfordshire	1st Bedfordshire Royal Engineers (Volunteers)	East Anglian Divisional Telegraph Company
Cheshire	1st Cheshire Royal Engineers (Volunteers) (part)	2nd Welsh Field Company
Cheshire	2nd Cheshire (Railway) Royal Engineers (Volunteers)	Cheshire Railway Battalion
Cornwall	Raised 1908	Cornwall (Fortress) Royal Engineers (No.1 Electric Light Company, Nos. 2 and 3 Works Companies)
Devonshire	1st Devonshire and Somersetshire Royal Engineers (Volunteers) (part)	Devonshire (Fortress) Royal Engineers (Nos.1, 2 and 3 Works Companies, Nos. 4 and 5 Electric Light Companies)
Devonshire	1st Devonshire and Somersetshire Royal Engineers (Volunteers) (part)	2nd Wessex Field Company
Dorset	Raised 1908	Dorsetshire & Wiltshire (Fortress) Royal Engineers (Dorsetshire Electric Lights Company)
Durham	1st Durham Royal Engineers (Volunteers)	1st Northumbrian Field Company
Durham	1st Durham Royal Engineers (Volunteers)	Northumbrian Divisional Telegraph Company
City of Dundee	Raised 1908	City of Dundee (Fortress) Royal Engineers (No.1 Works Company)
City of Edinburgh	Forth Division, Electrical Engineers (Volunteers)	City of Edinburgh (Fortress) Royal Engineers (No.1 Works Company and No.2 Electric Light Company)
Essex	Raised 1908	Essex (Fortress) Royal Engineers (No.1 Electric Light Company)
Glamorganshire	Severn Division Electrical Engineers (Volunteers)	Glamorganshire (Fortress) Royal Engineers (Nos.1 and 2 Works Companies, No. 3 Electric Light Company)
Glamorganshire	Severn Division Electrical Engineers (Volunteers)	Welsh Divisional Telegraph Company
City of Glasgow	1st Lanarkshire Royal Engineers (Volunteers)	1st Lowland Field Company
City of Glasgow	1st Lanarkshire Royal Engineers (Volunteers)	Scottish Wireless Telegraph Company
City of Glasgow	1st Lanarkshire Royal Engineers (Volunteers)	Scottish Air-line Telegraph Company
City of Glasgow	1st Lanarkshire Royal Engineers (Volunteers)	Scottish Cable Telegraph Company
Gloucestershire	2nd Gloucestershire (The Bristol Engineer Volunteer Corps) Royal Engineers (part)	1st South Midland Field Company
Gloucestershire	2nd Gloucestershire (The Bristol Engineer Volunteer Corps) Royal Engineers (part)	2nd South Midland Field Company
Gloucestershire	2nd Gloucestershire (The Bristol Engineer Volunteer Corps) Royal Engineers (part)	South Midland Divisional Telegraph Company
Hampshire	1st Hampshire Royal Engineers (Volunteers)	Hampshire (Fortress) Royal Engineers (Nos. 1 to 3 Works Companies and Nos. 4 to 6 Electric Light Companies)
Kent	1st Sussex Royal Engineers (Volunteers) (part)	Kent (Fortress) Royal Engineers (Nos. 1 to 3 Works Companies and Nos. 4 to 6 Electric Light Companies)
Kent	1st Sussex Royal Engineers (Volunteers) (part)	Cinque Ports (Fortress) Royal Engineers (No. 1 Electric Light Company)
Lanarkshire	2nd Lanarkshire Royal Engineers (Volunteers)	2nd Highland Field Company
Lanarkshire	2nd Lanarkshire Royal Engineers (Volunteers)	Lanarkshire (Fortress) Royal Engineers
Lanarkshire	2nd Lanarkshire Royal Engineers (Volunteers)	2nd Lowland Field Company
Lanarkshire	2nd Lanarkshire Royal Engineers (Volunteers)	Lowland Divisional Telegraph Company
Lancashire	1st Lancashire Royal Engineers (Volunteers)	Lancashire (Fortress) Royal Engineers (No.1 Works Company)
Lancashire	1st Lancashire Royal Engineers (Volunteers)	West Lancashire Divisional Telegraph Company
Lancashire	2nd Lancashire Royal Engineers (Volunteers)	1st West Lancashire Field Company
Lancashire	2nd Lancashire Royal Engineers (Volunteers)	2nd West Lancashire Field Company
Lancashire	3rd Lancashire Royal Engineers (Volunteers)	1st East Lancashire Field Company
Lancashire	3rd Lancashire Royal Engineers (Volunteers)	2nd East Lancashire Field Company
Lancashire	3rd Lancashire Royal Engineers (Volunteers)	East Lancashire Divisional Telegraph Company
Lancashire	Mersey Division Electrical Engineers (Volunteers)	Lancashire (Fortress) Royal Engineers (Nos. 2 and 3 Electric Light Companies)
County of London	East London (Tower Hamlets) Royal Engineers (Volunteers)	1st London Field Company
County of London	East London (Tower Hamlets) Royal Engineers (Volunteers)	2nd London Field Company
County of London	East London (Tower Hamlets) Royal Engineers (Volunteers)	London Air-Line Telegraph Company
County of London	London Division Electrical Engineers (Volunteers)	London (Fortress) Royal Engineers
County of London	London Division Electrical Engineers (Volunteers)	1st London Divisional Telegraph Company
County of London	London Division Electrical Engineers (Volunteers)	London Wireless Telegraph Company
County of London	London Division Electrical Engineers (Volunteers)	London Cable Telegraph Company
County of London	London Division Electrical Engineers (Volunteers)	London Balloon Telegraph Company
County of London	1st Middlesex Royal Engineers (Volunteers)	3rd London Field Company
County of London	1st Middlesex Royal Engineers (Volunteers)	4th London Field Company
County of London	1st Middlesex Royal Engineers (Volunteers)	2nd London Divisional Telegraph Company
Northumberland	1st Newcastle upon Tyne Royal Engineers (Volunteers)	Northumberland (Fortress) Royal Engineers (part)
Northumberland	1st Newcastle upon Tyne Royal Engineers (Volunteers)	2nd Northumbrian Field Company
Northumberland	Tyne Division Electrical Engineers (Volunteers)	Northumberland (Fortress) Royal Engineers
Renfrewshire	Clyde Division, Electrical Engineers (Volunteers)	Renfrewshire (Fortress) Royal Engineers (No.1 Fortress Works Company and No.2 Electric Light Company)
Somersetshire	1st Devonshire and Somersetshire Royal Engineers (Volunteers) (part)	1st Wessex Field Company
Somersetshire	1st Devonshire and Somersetshire Royal Engineers (Volunteers) (part)	Wessex Divisional Telegraph Company
Southampton	1st Hampshire Royal Engineers (Volunteers)	Hampshire (Fortress) Royal Engineers (Nos. 1, 2 and 3 Works Companies, Nos. 4, 5 and 6 Electric Light Companies)
Staffordshire	1st Volunteer Battalion, The South Staffordshire Regiment (part)	1st North Midland Field Company
Sussex	1st Sussex Royal Engineers (Volunteers) (part)	Sussex (Fortress) Royal Engineers
Sussex	1st Sussex Royal Engineers (Volunteers) (part)	1st Home Counties Field Company
Sussex	1st Sussex Royal Engineers (Volunteers) (part)	2nd Home Counties Field Company
Sussex	1st Sussex Royal Engineers (Volunteers) (part)	Home Counties Divisional Telegraph Company
Wiltshire	Raised 1908	Dorsetshire & Wiltshire (Fortress) Royal Engineers (Wiltshire Works Company)
East Riding of Yorkshire	Raised 1908	East Riding (Fortress) Royal Engineers (No.1 Works Company and No.2 Electric Light Company)
North Riding of Yorkshire	Tees Division Electrical Engineers (Volunteers)	North Riding (Fortress) Royal Engineers (No.1 Electric Light Company)
West Riding of Yorkshire	1st Yorkshire (West Riding) Royal Engineers (Volunteers)	1st West Riding Field Company
West Riding of Yorkshire	1st Yorkshire (West Riding) Royal Engineers (Volunteers)	2nd West Riding Field Company
West Riding of Yorkshire	1st Yorkshire (West Riding) Royal Engineers (Volunteers)	West Riding Divisional Telegraph Company
West Riding of Yorkshire	2nd (Leeds) Yorkshire (West Riding) Engineer Volunteers (part)	Northern Wireless Telegraph Company
West Riding of Yorkshire	2nd (Leeds) Yorkshire (West Riding) Engineer Volunteers (part)	Northern Air-Line Telegraph Company
West Riding of Yorkshire	2nd (Leeds) Yorkshire (West Riding) Engineer Volunteers (part)	Northern Cable Telegraph Company

== Infantry and cyclist battalions ==
County Association	Unit of the Volunteers	Unit of the Territorial Force
City of Aberdeen	1st VB, The Gordon Highlanders	4th (City of Aberdeen) Bn, The Gordon Highlanders (part)
Aberdeenshire	2nd VB, The Gordon Highlanders	5th (Buchan and Formartin) Bn, The Gordon Highlanders (part)
Aberdeenshire	3rd (Buchan) VB, The Gordon Highlanders	5th (Buchan and Formartin) Bn, The Gordon Highlanders (part)
Aberdeenshire	4th (Donside Highland) VB, The Gordon Highlanders	6th (The Banff and Donside) Bn, The Gordon Highlanders (part)
Aberdeenshire	5th (Deeside Highland) VB, The Gordon Highlanders (part)	7th (Deeside Highland) Bn, The Gordon Highlanders (part)
Anglesey	3rd VB, The Royal Welsh Fusiliers (part)	6th Bn, The Royal Welsh Fusiliers 1909 redesignated: 6th (Caernarvonshire and Anglesey) Battalion, Royal Welch Fusiliers
Argyllshire	5th VB, Princess Louise's (Argyll and Sutherland Highlanders)	8th (The Argyllshire) Bn, Princess Louise's (Argyll and Sutherland Highlanders)
Ayrshire	1st VB, The Royal Scots Fusiliers	4th Bn, The Royal Scots Fusiliers
Ayrshire	2nd VB, The Royal Scots Fusiliers	5th Bn, The Royal Scots Fusiliers
Banffshire	6th VB, The Gordon Highlanders	6th (The Banff and Donside) Bn, The Gordon Highlanders (part)
Bedfordshire	3rd VB, The Bedfordshire Regiment	5th Bn, The Bedfordshire Regiment (part)
Berkshire	1st VB, The Princess Charlotte of Wales's (Royal Berkshire Regiment)	4th Bn, The Princess Charlotte of Wales's (Royal Berkshire Regiment)
Berwickshire	2nd (Berwickshire) VB, The King's Own Scottish Borderers	4th Bn, The King's Own Scottish Borderers (part)
Brecknockshire	1st (Brecknockshire) VB, South Wales Borderers	Brecknockshire Battalion, South Wales Borderers
Buckinghamshire	1st Buckinghamshire VRC (Volunteer Rifle Corps)	The Buckinghamshire Bn, The Oxfordshire Light Infantry
Caithness-shire	1st Sutherland (The Sutherland Highland) VRC (part)	5th (The Sutherland and Caithness Highland) Bn, Seaforth Highlanders (Ross-shire Buffs, The Duke of Albany's) (part)
Cambridgeshire	3rd (Cambridgeshire) VB, The Suffolk Regiment	Cambridgeshire Bn, The Suffolk Regiment 1909 redesignated: 1st Bn, The Cambridgeshire Regiment
Cardiganshire	1st (Pembrokeshire) VB, The Welsh Regiment (part)	4th Bn, The Welsh Regiment (part)
Carmarthenshire	1st (Pembrokeshire) VB, The Welsh Regiment (part)	4th Bn, The Welsh Regiment (part)
Carnarvonshire	3rd VB, The Royal Welsh Fusiliers (part)	6th Bn, The Royal Welsh Fusiliers 1909 redesignated: 6th (Carnarvonshire and Anglesey) Bn, The Royal Welsh Fusiliers
Cheshire	1st VB, The Cheshire Regiment	4th Bn, The Cheshire Regiment
Cheshire	2nd (Earl of Chester's) VB, The Cheshire Regiment	5th (Earl of Chester's) Bn, The Cheshire Regiment
Cheshire	3rd VB, The Cheshire Regiment	5th (Earl of Chester's) Bn, The Cheshire Regiment
Cheshire	4th VB, The Cheshire Regiment	6th Bn, The Cheshire Regiment
Cheshire	5th VB, The Cheshire Regiment	7th Bn, The Cheshire Regiment
Clackmannanshire	7th (Clackmannan and Kinross) VB, Princess Louise's (Argyll and Sutherland Highlanders) (part)	7th Bn, Princess Louise's (Argyll and Sutherland Highlanders) (part)
Cornwall	1st Volunteer Battalion, The Duke of Cornwall's Light Infantry	4th Battalion, The Duke of Cornwall's Light Infantry
Cornwall	2nd VB, The Duke of Cornwall's Light Infantry	5th Bn, The Duke of Cornwall's Light Infantry
Cumberland	1st (Cumberland) VB, The Border Regiment	4th (Cumberland and Westmorland) Bn, The Border Regiment (part)
Cumberland	3rd (Cumberland) VB, The Border Regiment	5th (Cumberland) Bn, The Border Regiment
Denbighshire	1st VB, Royal Welsh Fusiliers	4th (Denbighshire) Bn, Royal Welsh Fusiliers
Denbighshire	2nd VB, Royal Welsh Fusiliers (part)	5th Bn, The Royal Welsh Fusiliers 1909 redesignated: 5th (Flintshire) Bn, Royal Welsh Fusiliers
Derbyshire	1st VB, The Sherwood Foresters (Nottinghamshire and Derbyshire Regiment)	5th (Derbyshire) Bn, The Sherwood Foresters (Nottinghamshire and Derbyshire Regiment)
Derbyshire	2nd VB, The Sherwood Foresters (Nottinghamshire and Derbyshire Regiment)	6th Bn, The Sherwood Foresters (Nottinghamshire and Derbyshire Regiment)
Devonshire	1st (Exeter and South Devon) VB, The Devonshire Regiment	4th Bn, The Devonshire Regiment
Devonshire	2nd (Prince of Wales's) VB, The Devonshire Regiment	5th (Prince of Wales's) Bn, The Devonshire Regiment (part)
Devonshire	3rd VB, The Devonshire Regiment	4th Bn, The Devonshire Regiment (part)
Devonshire	4th VB, The Devonshire Regiment	6th Bn, The Devonshire Regiment
Devonshire	5th (The Hay Tor) VB, The Devonshire Regiment	5th (Prince of Wales's) Bn, The Devonshire Regiment (part)
Devonshire	Raised 1908	7th (Cyclist) Bn, The Devonshire Regiment
Dorsetshire	1st VB, Dorsetshire Regiment	4th Bn, Dorsetshire Regiment
Dunbartonshire	1st Dunbartonshire VRC	9th (Dunbartonshire) Bn, Princess Louise's (Argyll and Sutherland Highlanders)
Dumfriesshire	3rd (Dumfriesshire) VB, The King's Own Scottish Borderers	5th Bn, The King's Own Scottish Borderers (part)
City of Dundee	1st (City of Dundee) VB, The Black Watch (Royal Highlanders)	4th (City of Dundee) Bn, The Black Watch (Royal Highlanders)
City of Dundee	3rd (Dundee Highland) VB, The Black Watch (Royal Highlanders)	5th (Angus and Dundee) Bn, The Black Watch (Royal Highlanders) (part)
Durham	1st VB, The Durham Light Infantry	5th Bn, The Durham Light Infantry
Durham	2nd VB, The Durham Light Infantry	6th Bn, The Durham Light Infantry
Durham	3rd (Sunderland) VB, The Durham Light Infantry	7th Bn, The Durham Light Infantry
Durham	4th VB, The Durham Light Infantry	8th Bn, The Durham Light Infantry
Durham	5th VB, The Durham Light Infantry	9th Bn, The Durham Light Infantry
City of Edinburgh	The Queen's Rifle Volunteer Brigade (part)	4th (Queen's Edinburgh Rifles) Bn, The Royal Scots
City of Edinburgh	The Queen's Rifle Volunteer Brigade (part)	5th (Queen's Edinburgh Rifles) Bn, The Royal Scots
City of Edinburgh	9th VB, The Royal Scots (part)	9th (Highland) Bn, The Royal Scots
Elginshire	3rd (Morayshire) VB, Seaforth Highlanders (Ross-shire Buffs, The Duke of Albany's) (part)	6th (Morayshire) Bn, Seaforth Highlanders (Ross-shire Buffs, The Duke of Albany's) (part)
Essex	1st VB, The Essex Regiment	4th Bn, The Essex Regiment
Essex	2nd VB, The Essex Regiment	5th Bn, The Essex Regiment
Essex	3rd VB, The Essex Regiment	6th Bn, The Essex Regiment
Essex	4th VB, The Essex Regiment	7th Bn, The Essex Regiment
Essex	Raised 1908	The Essex and Suffolk Cyclist Battalion 1910 redesignated: 8th (Cyclist) Bn, The Essex Regiment
Fife	6th (Fife) VB, The Black Watch (Royal Highlanders)	7th (Fife) Bn, The Black Watch (Royal Highlanders)
Flintshire	2nd VB, Royal Welsh Fusiliers (part)	5th Bn, The Royal Welsh Fusiliers 1909 redesignated: 5th (Flintshire) Bn, Royal Welsh Fusiliers
Forfarshire	2nd (Angus) VB, The Black Watch (Royal Highlanders)	5th (Angus and Dundee) Bn, The Black Watch (Royal Highlanders) (part)
Glamorganshire	2nd (Glamorgan) VB, The Welsh Regiment (part)	7th (Cyclist) Bn, The Welsh Regiment
Glamorganshire	3rd (Glamorgan) VB, The Welsh Regiment	5th Bn, The Welsh Regiment
Glamorganshire	3rd Glamorganshire VRC	6th (Glamorgan) Bn, The Welsh Regiment
City of Glasgow	1st Lanarkshire (or Glasgow 1st Northern) RVC	5th Bn, Cameronians (Scottish Rifles)
City of Glasgow	3rd Lanarkshire RVC	7th Bn, The Cameronians (Scottish Rifles)
City of Glasgow	4th VB, The Cameronians (Scottish Rifles)	8th Bn, Cameronians (Scottish Rifles)
City of Glasgow	1st VB, The Highland Light Infantry	5th (City of Glasgow) Bn, The Highland Light Infantry
City of Glasgow	2nd VB, The Highland Light Infantry	6th (City of Glasgow) Bn, The Highland Light Infantry
City of Glasgow	3rd (The Blythswood) VB, The Highland Light Infantry	7th (Blythswood) Bn, Highland Light Infantry
City of Glasgow	5th (Glasgow Highland) VB, The Highland Light Infantry	9th (Glasgow Highland) Bn, Highland Light Infantry
Gloucestershire	1st (City of Bristol) VB, The Gloucestershire Regiment	4th (City of Bristol) Bn, The Gloucestershire Regiment
Gloucestershire	2nd VB, The Gloucestershire Regiment	5th Bn, The Gloucestershire Regiment
Gloucestershire	3rd VB, The Gloucestershire Regiment	6th Bn, The Gloucestershire Regiment
Haddingtonshire	6th VB, The Royal Scots (part) 7th VB, The Royal Scots (part)	8th Bn, The Royal Scots (part)
Herefordshire	1st Herefordshire (Hereford and Radnor) VRC (part)	Herefordshire Bn, The King's (Shropshire Light Infantry) (part) 1909 redesignated: 1st Bn The Herefordshire Regiment
Hertfordshire	1st (Hertfordshire) VB, The Bedfordshire Regiment (part)	The Hertfordshire Bn, The Bedfordshire Regiment 1909: redesignated: 1st Bn, The Hertfordshire Regiment
Hertfordshire	2nd (Hertfordshire) VB, The Bedfordshire Regiment (part)	The Hertfordshire Bn, The Bedfordshire Regiment 1909: redesignated: 1st Bn, The Hertfordshire Regiment
Huntingdonshire	4th (Huntingdonshire) VB, The Bedfordshire Regiment	5th Bn, The Bedfordshire Regiment (part)
Inverness-shire	3rd (Morayshire) VB, Seaforth Highlanders (Ross-shire Buffs, The Duke of Albany's) (part)	6th (Morayshire) Bn, Seaforth Highlanders (Ross-shire Buffs, The Duke of Albany's) (part)
Inverness-shire	1st (Inverness Highland) VB, The Queen's Own Cameron Highlanders	4th Bn, The Queen's Own Cameron Highlanders
Kent	1st VB, The Buffs (East Kent Regiment)	4th Bn, The Buffs (East Kent Regiment)
Kent	2nd VB, The Buffs (East Kent Regiment)	5th Bn, The Buffs (East Kent Regiment)
Kent	1st VB, The Queen's Own (Royal West Kent Regiment)	4th Bn, The Queen's Own (Royal West Kent Regiment)
Kent	1st VB, The Queen's Own (Royal West Kent Regiment)	5th Bn, The Queen's Own (Royal West Kent Regiment)
Kent	Raised 1908	6th (Cyclist) Bn, The Queen's Own (Royal West Kent Regiment) 1910 redesignated: The Kent Cyclist Battalion
Kincardineshire	5th (Deeside Highland) VB, The Gordon Highlanders (part)	7th (Deeside Highland) Bn, The Gordon Highlanders (part)
Kinross-shire	7th (Clackmannan and Kinross) VB, Princess Louise's (Argyll and Sutherland Highlanders) (part)	7th Bn, Princess Louise's (Argyll and Sutherland Highlanders) (part)
Kirkcudbrightshire	The Galloway VRC (part)	5th Bn, The King's Own Scottish Borderers (part)
Lanarkshire	2nd VB, The Cameronians (Scottish Rifles)	6th Bn, The Cameronians (Scottish Rifles)
Lanarkshire	9th Lanarkshire VRC, The Highland Light Infantry	8th (Lanark) Bn, The Highland Light Infantry
Lancashire	1st VB, The King's Own (Royal Lancaster Regiment)	4th Bn, The King's Own (Royal Lancaster Regiment)
Lancashire	2nd VB, The King's Own (Royal Lancaster Regiment)	5th Bn, The King's Own (Royal Lancaster Regiment)
Lancashire	1st VB, King's (Liverpool Regiment)	5th Bn, King's Regiment (Liverpool)
Lancashire	2nd VB, King's Regiment (Liverpool)	6th (Rifle) Bn, King's Regiment (Liverpool)
Lancashire	3rd VB, The King's Regiment (Liverpool)	Disbanded 1908
Lancashire	4th VB, The King's Regiment (Liverpool)	7th Bn, The King's Regiment (Liverpool)
Lancashire	5th (Irish) VB, King's Regiment (Liverpool)	8th Bn, King's Regiment (Liverpool) 1909: redesignated 8th (Irish) Bn, King's Regiment (Liverpool)
Lancashire	6th VB, The King's Regiment (Liverpool)	9th Bn, The King's Regiment (Liverpool)
Lancashire	8th (Scottish) VB, The King's Regiment (Liverpool)	10th (Scottish) Bn, The King's Regiment (Liverpool)
Lancashire	1st VB, The Lancashire Fusiliers	5th Bn, The Lancashire Fusiliers
Lancashire	2nd VB, The Lancashire Fusiliers	6th Bn, The Lancashire Fusiliers
Lancashire	3rd VB, The Lancashire Fusiliers	7th Bn, The Lancashire Fusiliers
Lancashire	3rd VB, The Lancashire Fusiliers	8th Bn, The Lancashire Fusiliers
Lancashire	1st VB, The East Lancashire Regiment	4th Bn, the East Lancashire Regiment
Lancashire	2nd VB, The East Lancashire Regiment	5th Bn, The East Lancashire Regiment
Lancashire	1st VB, The Prince of Wales's Volunteers (South Lancashire Regiment)	4th Bn, The Prince of Wales's Volunteers (South Lancashire Regiment)
Lancashire	2nd VB, The Prince of Wales's Volunteers (South Lancashire Regiment)	5th Bn, The Prince of Wales's Volunteers (South Lancashire Regiment)
Lancashire	1st VB, The Loyal North Lancashire Regiment	4th Bn, The Loyal North Lancashire Regiment
Lancashire	2nd VB, The Loyal North Lancashire Regiment	5th Bn, The Loyal North Lancashire Regiment
Lancashire	1st VB, Manchester Regiment	5th Bn, Manchester Regiment
Lancashire	2nd VB, Manchester Regiment	6th Bn, Manchester Regiment
Lancashire	4th VB, The Manchester Regiment	7th Bn, Manchester Regiment
Lancashire	5th (Ardwick) VB, The Manchester Regiment	8th (Ardwick) Bn, The Manchester Regiment
Lancashire	3rd VB, The Manchester Regiment	9th Bn, The Manchester Regiment
Lancashire	6th VB, The Manchester Regiment	10th Bn, The Manchester Regiment
Leicestershire	1st VB, Leicestershire Regiment	4th Bn, Leicestershire Regiment
Leicestershire	1st VB, Leicestershire Regiment	5th Bn, The Leicestershire Regiment
Lincolnshire	1st VB, The Lincolnshire Regiment 2nd VB, The Lincolnshire Regiment	4th Bn, The Lincolnshire Regiment
Lincolnshire	3rd VB, Lincolnshire Regiment	5th Bn, The Lincolnshire Regiment 6th Bn, The Lincolnshire Regiment (never formed)
Linlithgow	8th VB, The Royal Scots	10th (Cyclist) Bn, Royal Scots
City of London	1st VB, Royal Fusiliers	1st (City of London) Bn, London Regiment (Royal Fusiliers)
City of London	2nd VB, Royal Fusiliers	2nd (City of London) Bn, London Regiment (Royal Fusiliers)
City of London	3rd VB, Royal Fusiliers	3rd (City of London) Bn, London Regiment
City of London	4th VB, Royal Fusiliers	4th (City of London) Bn, London Regiment
City of London	1st London VRC (City of London Volunteer Rifle Brigade)	5th (City of London) Bn, London Regiment (London Rifle Brigade)
City of London	2nd London VRC	6th (City of London) Bn, London Regiment, (City of London Rifles)
City of London	3rd London VRC	7th (City of London) Bn, London Regiment
City of London	24th Middlesex VRC	8th (City of London) Bn, London Regiment (Post Office Rifles)
City of London	Honourable Artillery Company (part)	26th (City of London) Bn, The London Regiment (Honourable Artillery Company) Title not adopted, and unit continued to be known as: Honourable Artillery Company Infantry Battalion
County of London	1st Middlesex VRC (Queen Victoria's)	9th (County of London) Bn, London Regiment (Queen Victoria's) (part)
County of London	19th (St Giles and St George's Bloomsbury) Middlesex VRC	9th (County of London) Bn, London Regiment (Queen Victoria's) (part)
County of London	18th Middlesex VRC	10th (County of London) Bn, London Regiment (Paddington Rifles) Disbanded 1912, when a new 10th battalion was formed: 10th (County of London) Bn, London Regiment (Hackney)
County of London	21st Middlesex (Finsbury) VRC	11th (County of London) Bn, London Regiment (Finsbury Rifles)
County of London	22nd Middlesex VRC (Central London Rangers)	12th (County of London) Bn, London Regiment (Rangers)
County of London	2nd Middlesex VRC (South Middlesex) (part)	13th (County of London) Bn, London Regiment (Kensington) 1914 redesignated: 13th (County of London) Princess Louise's Kensington Bn, London Regiment
County of London	4th Middlesex VRC (West London)	13th (County of London) Bn, London Regiment (Kensington) 1914 redesignated: 13th (County of London) Princess Louise's Kensington Bn, London Regiment
County of London	7th Middlesex (London Scottish) VRC	14th (County of London) Bn, London Regiment (London Scottish)
County of London	12th Middlesex (Civil Service) VRC	15th (County of London) Bn, London Regiment (The Prince of Wales's Civil Service Rifles)
County of London	13th Middlesex VRC (Queen's Westminsters)	16th (County of London) Bn, London Regiment (Queen's Westminster Rifles)
County of London	2nd Tower Hamlets VRC	17th (County of London) Bn, London Regiment (Poplar and Stepney Rifles)
County of London	15th Middlesex VRC (Customs and Docks)	17th (County of London) Bn, London Regiment (Poplar and Stepney Rifles)
County of London	16th Middlesex VRC (London Irish)	18th (County of London) Bn, London Regiment (London Irish Rifles)
County of London	17th Middlesex VRC (North Middlesex) (3rd Volunteer Bn, Middlesex Regiment)	19th (County of London) Bn, London Regiment (St Pancras)
County of London	2nd VB, Queen's Own (Royal West Kent Regiment)	20th (County of London) Bn, The London Regiment (Blackheath and Woolwich)
County of London	3rd VB, Queen's Own (Royal West Kent Regiment)	20th (County of London) Bn, The London Regiment (Blackheath and Woolwich)
County of London	1st Surrey (South London) VRC (1st VB, East Surrey Regiment)	21st (County of London) Bn, London Regiment (1st Surrey Rifles)
County of London	3rd VB, Queen's (Royal West Surrey Regiment)	22nd (County of London) Bn, London Regiment (The Queen's)
County of London	4th VB, East Surrey Regiment	23rd (County of London) Bn, London Regiment
County of London	4th VB, Queen's (Royal West Surrey Regiment)	24th (County of London) Bn, London Regiment (The Queen's)
County of London	26th Middlesex (Cyclist) VRC	25th (County of London) (Cyclist) Bn, London Regiment
County of London	14th Middlesex VRC (Inns of Court)	27th (County of London) Bn, The London Regiment (Inns of Court) Title not adopted by unit. redesignated 1909 as: Inns of Court Officer Training Corps
County of London	20th Middlesex (Artists) VRC	28th (County of London) Bn, London Regiment (Artists Rifles)
Merionethshire	5th VB, South Wales Borderers (part)	7th Bn, The Royal Welsh Fusiliers (part) 1909 redesignated: 7th (Merionethshire and Montgomeryshire) Bn, Royal Welsh Fusiliers
Middlesex	1st VB, The Middlesex Regiment	7th Bn, The Middlesex Regiment
Middlesex	8th Middlesex (South West Middlesex) VRC	8th Bn, The Middlesex Regiment
Middlesex	5th Middlesex (West Middlesex) VRC	9th Bn, Middlesex Regiment
Middlesex	2nd Middlesex (South Middlesex) VRC (part)	10th Bn, Middlesex Regiment (considered a new unit)
Midlothian	4th Volunteer Battalion, Royal Scots	6th Bn, Royal Scots
Midlothian	5th VB, The Royal Scots	7th Bn, Royal Scots
Midlothian	6th VB, The Royal Scots (part) 7th VB, The Royal Scots (part)	8th Bn, The Royal Scots (part)
Monmouthshire	2nd VB, The South Wales Borderers	1st (Rifle) Bn, The Monmouthshire Regiment
Monmouthshire	3rd VB, The South Wales Borderers	2nd Bn, The Monmouthshire Regiment
Monmouthshire	4th VB, The South Wales Borderers	3rd Bn, The Monmouthshire Regiment
Montgomeryshire	5th VB, The South Wales Borderers (part)	7th Bn, The Royal Welsh Fusiliers (part) 1909 redesignated: 7th (Merionethshire and Montgomeryshire) Bn, The Royal Welsh Fusiliers
Nairnshire	3rd (Morayshire) VB, Seaforth Highlanders (Ross-shire Buffs, The Duke of Albany's) (part)	6th (Morayshire) Bn, Seaforth Highlanders (Ross-shire Buffs, The Duke of Albany's) (part)
Norfolk	1st VB, The Norfolk Regiment	4th Bn, The Norfolk Regiment
Norfolk	2nd VB, The Norfolk Regiment	5th Bn, The Norfolk Regiment
Norfolk	4th VB, The Norfolk Regiment	6th Bn, The Norfolk Regiment
Northamptonshire	1st VB, Northamptonshire Regiment (part)	4th Bn, Northamptonshire Regiment
Northumberland	1st VB, Northumberland Fusiliers	4th Bn, Northumberland Fusiliers
Northumberland	2nd VB, Northumberland Fusiliers	5th Bn, Northumberland Fusiliers
Northumberland	3rd VB, Northumberland Fusiliers (part)	6th Bn, Northumberland Fusiliers
Nottinghamshire	1st Nottinghamshire (Robin Hood) VRC	7th (Robin Hood) Bn, Sherwood Foresters (Nottinghamshire and Derbyshire Regiment)
Nottinghamshire	4th (Nottinghamshire) VB, Sherwood Foresters (Nottinghamshire and Derbyshire Regiment)	8th (Nottinghamshire) Bn, Sherwood Foresters (Nottinghamshire and Derbyshire Regiment)
Oxfordshire	2nd VB, Oxfordshire Light Infantry	4th Bn, Oxfordshire and Buckinghamshire Light Infantry
Pembrokeshire	1st (Pembrokeshire) VB, The Welsh Regiment (part)	4th Bn, The Welsh Regiment (part)
Peebles	6th VB, Royal Scots (part) 7th VB, Royal Scots (part)	8th Bn, Royal Scots (part)
Perthshire	4th (Perthshire) VB, The Black Watch (Royal Highlanders)	6th (Perthshire) Bn, The Black Watch (Royal Highlanders)
Perthshire	5th (Perthshire Highland) VB, The Black Watch (Royal Highlanders)	8th (Cyclist) Bn, The Black Watch (Royal Highlanders)
Radnorshire	1st Herefordshire (Hereford and Radnor) VRC (part)	Herefordshire Bn, King's (Shropshire Light Infantry) (part) 1909 redesignated: 1st Bn Herefordshire Regiment
Renfrewshire	1st (Renfrewshire) VB, Princess Louise's (Argyll and Sutherland Highlanders)	5th Bn, Princess Louise's (Argyll and Sutherland Highlanders)
Renfrewshire	2nd (Renfrewshire) VB, Princess Louise's (Argyll and Sutherland Highlanders)	6th Bn, Princess Louise's (Argyll and Sutherland Highlanders)
Renfrewshire	3rd (Renfrewshire) VB, Princess Louise's (Argyll and Sutherland Highlanders)	6th Bn, Princess Louise's (Argyll and Sutherland Highlanders)
Ross and Cromarty	1st (Ross Highland) VB, Seaforth Highlanders (Ross-shire Buffs, The Duke of Albany's)	4th (Ross-shire) Bn, Seaforth Highlanders (Ross-shire Buffs, The Duke of Albany's)
Roxburghshire	1st Roxburgh and Selkirk (The Border) VRC (part)	4th Bn, The King's Own Scottish Borderers (part)
Selkirkshire	1st Roxburgh and Selkirk (The Border) VRC (part)	4th Bn, The King's Own Scottish Borderers (part)
Shetland	7th VB, The Gordon Highlanders	4th (City of Aberdeen) Bn, The Gordon Highlanders (part)
Shropshire	1st VB, The King's (Shropshire Light Infantry)	4th Bn, The King's (Shropshire Light Infantry)
Shropshire	2nd VB, The King's (Shropshire Light Infantry)	4th Bn, The King's (Shropshire Light Infantry)
Somersetshire	1st VB, Prince Albert's (Somersetshire Light Infantry) 2nd VB, The Prince Albert's (Somersetshire Light Infantry)	4th Bn, The Prince Albert's (Somersetshire Light Infantry) 5th Bn, The Prince Albert's (Somersetshire Light Infantry)
Southampton	1st VB, The Hampshire Regiment	4th Bn, The Hampshire Regiment
Southampton	2nd VB, The Hampshire Regiment	5th Bn, The Hampshire Regiment
Southampton	3rd (Duke of Connaught's Own) VB, Hampshire Regiment	6th (Duke of Connaught's Own) Bn, Hampshire Regiment
Southampton	4th VB, The Hampshire Regiment	7th Bn, The Hampshire Regiment
Southampton	5th (Isle of Wight, Princess Beatrices's) VB, Hampshire Regiment	8th Bn, Hampshire Regiment (Princess Beatrice's Isle of Wight Rifles)
Staffordshire	1st VB, The South Staffordshire Regiment (part)	5th Bn, The South Staffordshire Regiment
Staffordshire	2nd VB, The South Staffordshire Regiment	5th Bn, The South Staffordshire Regiment
Staffordshire	3rd VB, The South Staffordshire Regiment	6th Bn, The South Staffordshire Regiment
Staffordshire	1st VB, The Prince of Wales's (North Staffordshire Regiment)	5th Bn, The Prince of Wales's (North Staffordshire Regiment)
Staffordshire	2nd VB, The Prince of Wales's (North Staffordshire Regiment)	6th Bn, The Prince of Wales's (North Staffordshire Regiment)
Stirlingshire	4th (Stirlingshire) VB, Princess Louise's (Argyll and Sutherland Highlanders)	7th Bn, Princess Louise's (Argyll and Sutherland Highlanders) (part)
Suffolk	1st VB, Suffolk Regiment	4th Bn, Suffolk Regiment
Suffolk	2nd VB, Suffolk Regiment	5th Bn, Suffolk Regiment
Surrey	1st VB, The Queen's (Royal West Surrey Regiment)	4th Bn, The Queen's (Royal West Surrey Regiment)
Surrey	2nd VB, The Queen's (Royal West Surrey Regiment)	5th Bn, The Queen's (Royal West Surrey Regiment)
Surrey	2nd VB, East Surrey Regiment	5th Bn, East Surrey Regiment
Surrey	3rd VB, East Surrey Regiment	6th Bn, East Surrey Regiment
Sussex	2nd VB, Royal Sussex Regiment	4th Bn, Royal Sussex Regiment
Sussex	1st Cinque Ports (Cinque Ports and Sussex) VRC	5th (Cinque Ports) Bn, Royal Sussex Regiment
Sussex	Raised 1912†	6th (Cyclist) Bn, Royal Sussex Regiment
Sutherland-shire	1st Sutherland (The Sutherland Highland) VRC (part)	5th (The Sutherland and Caithness Highland) Bn, Seaforth Highlanders (Ross-shire Buffs, The Duke of Albany's) (part)
Warwickshire	1st VB, Royal Warwickshire Regiment (double battalion)	5th Bn, Royal Warwickshire Regiment
Warwickshire	1st VB, Royal Warwickshire Regiment (double battalion)	6th Bn, Royal Warwickshire Regiment
Warwickshire	2nd VB, Royal Warwickshire Regiment	7th Bn, Royal Warwickshire Regiment
Westmorland	2nd (Westmorland) VB, The Border Regiment	4th (Cumberland and Westmorland) Bn, The Border Regiment (part)
Wigtownshire	The Galloway VRC (part)	5th Bn, The King's Own Scottish Borderers (part)
Wiltshire	1st Wiltshire VRC	4th Bn, The Duke of Edinburgh's (Wiltshire Regiment)
Wiltshire	2nd VB, The Duke of Edinburgh's (Wiltshire Regiment)	4th Bn, The Duke of Edinburgh's (Wiltshire Regiment)
Worcestershire	1st VB, Worcestershire Regiment	7th Bn, Worcestershire Regiment
Worcestershire	2nd VB, Worcestershire Regiment	8th Bn, Worcestershire Regiment
East Riding of Yorkshire	1st VB, East Yorkshire Regiment	4th Bn, East Yorkshire Regiment
East Riding of Yorkshire	2nd VB, East Yorkshire Regiment	5th (Cyclist) Bn, East Yorkshire Regiment
North Riding of Yorkshire	1st VB, The Princess of Wales's Own (Yorkshire Regiment)	4th Bn, The Princess of Wales's Own (Yorkshire Regiment)
North Riding of Yorkshire	2nd VB, The Princess of Wales's Own (Yorkshire Regiment)	5th Bn, The Princess of Wales's Own (Yorkshire Regiment)
West Riding of Yorkshire	1st VB, The Prince of Wales's Own (West Yorkshire Regiment)	5th Bn, The Prince of Wales's Own (West Yorkshire Regiment)
West Riding of Yorkshire	2nd VB, The Prince of Wales's Own (West Yorkshire Regiment)	6th Bn, The Prince of Wales's Own (West Yorkshire Regiment)
West Riding of Yorkshire	3rd VB, The Prince of Wales's Own (West Yorkshire Regiment) (double battalion)	7th (Leeds Rifles) Bn, The Prince of Wales's Own (West Yorkshire Regiment)
West Riding of Yorkshire	3rd VB, The Prince of Wales's Own (West Yorkshire Regiment) (double battalion)	8th (Leeds Rifles) Bn, The Prince of Wales's Own (West Yorkshire Regiment)
West Riding of Yorkshire	1st VB, The Duke of Wellington's (West Riding Regiment)	4th Bn, The Duke of Wellington's (West Riding Regiment)
West Riding of Yorkshire	2nd VB, The Duke of Wellington's (West Riding Regiment)	5th Bn, The Duke of Wellington's (West Riding Regiment) 7th Bn, The Duke of Wellington's (West Riding Regiment)
West Riding of Yorkshire	3rd VB, The Duke of Wellington's (West Riding Regiment)	6th Bn, The Duke of Wellington's (West Riding Regiment)
West Riding of Yorkshire	1st VB, The King's Own (Yorkshire Light Infantry)	4th Bn, The King's Own (Yorkshire Light Infantry)
West Riding of Yorkshire	1st VB, The King's Own (Yorkshire Light Infantry)	5th Bn, The King's Own (Yorkshire Light Infantry) (part)
West Riding of Yorkshire	1st (Hallamshire) VB, The York and Lancaster Regiment	4th Bn, The York and Lancaster Regiment 1909 redesignated: 4th (Hallamshire) Bn, York and Lancaster Regiment
West Riding of Yorkshire	2nd VB, The York and Lancaster Regiment	5th Bn, The York and Lancaster Regiment
West Riding of Yorkshire	2nd VB, The York and Lancaster Regiment	5th Bn, The King's Own (Yorkshire Light Infantry) (part)

† Formed from part of the former 1st VB. When the battalion was converted to artillery in 1908, a number of officers had refused to transfer, and were placed on the unattached list. They became the basis for the 6th Battalion in 1912.

== Army Service Corps ==
Each infantry division had an attached Divisional Transport and Supply Column of the ASC. A column consisted of four companies: a headquarters company and one attached to each of the three infantry brigades that made up the division. A smaller transport and supply column, consisting of a single company, was attached to each mounted brigade. While some of the ASC companies were formed by the conversion of existing infantry or artillery units of the volunteer force, most were newly raised in 1908.

=== Mounted Brigade Companies ===
County Association	Unit of the Territorial Force
Lancashire	East Lancashire Mounted Brigade Company
Essex	Eastern Mounted Brigade Company
Inverness-shire	Highland Mounted Brigade Company
	London Mounted Brigade Company
City of Glasgow	Lowland Mounted Brigade Company
Leicestershire	North Midland Mounted Brigade Company
	Nottinghamshire and Derbyshire Mounted Brigade Company
Surrey	South Eastern Mounted Brigade Company
Worcestershire	1st South Midland Mounted Brigade Company
Berkshire	2nd South Midland Mounted Brigade Company
Glamorganshire	South Wales Mounted Brigade Company
Wiltshire	1st South Western Mounted Brigade Company
Somersetshire	2nd South Western Mounted Brigade Company
Cheshire	Welsh Border Mounted Brigade Company
Lancashire	West Lancashire Mounted Brigade Company
West Riding of Yorkshire	Yorkshire Mounted Brigade Company

== Bibliography ==
- Norman E.H. Litchfield, The Territorial Artillery 1908–1988 (Their Lineage, Uniforms and Badges), Nottingham: Sherwood Press, 1992, ISBN 0-9508205-2-0.
- Norman Litchfield & Ray Westlake, The Volunteer Artillery 1859–1908 (Their Lineage, Uniforms and Badges), Nottingham: Sherwood Press, 1982, ISBN 9780950820507.
- Cliff Lord & Graham Watson, Royal Corps of Signals: Unit Histories of the Corps (1920–2001) and its Antecedents, Solihull: Helion, 2003, ISBN 1-874622-92-2.
- Westlake, Ray (1992). British Territorial Units 1914–18. Osprey Publishing. ISBN 978-1-85532-168-7.
- R.A. Westlake, Royal Engineers (Volunteers) 1859–1908, Wembley: R.A. Westlake, 1983, ISBN 0-9508530-0-3.
