= Submarine mining units of the Royal Engineers =

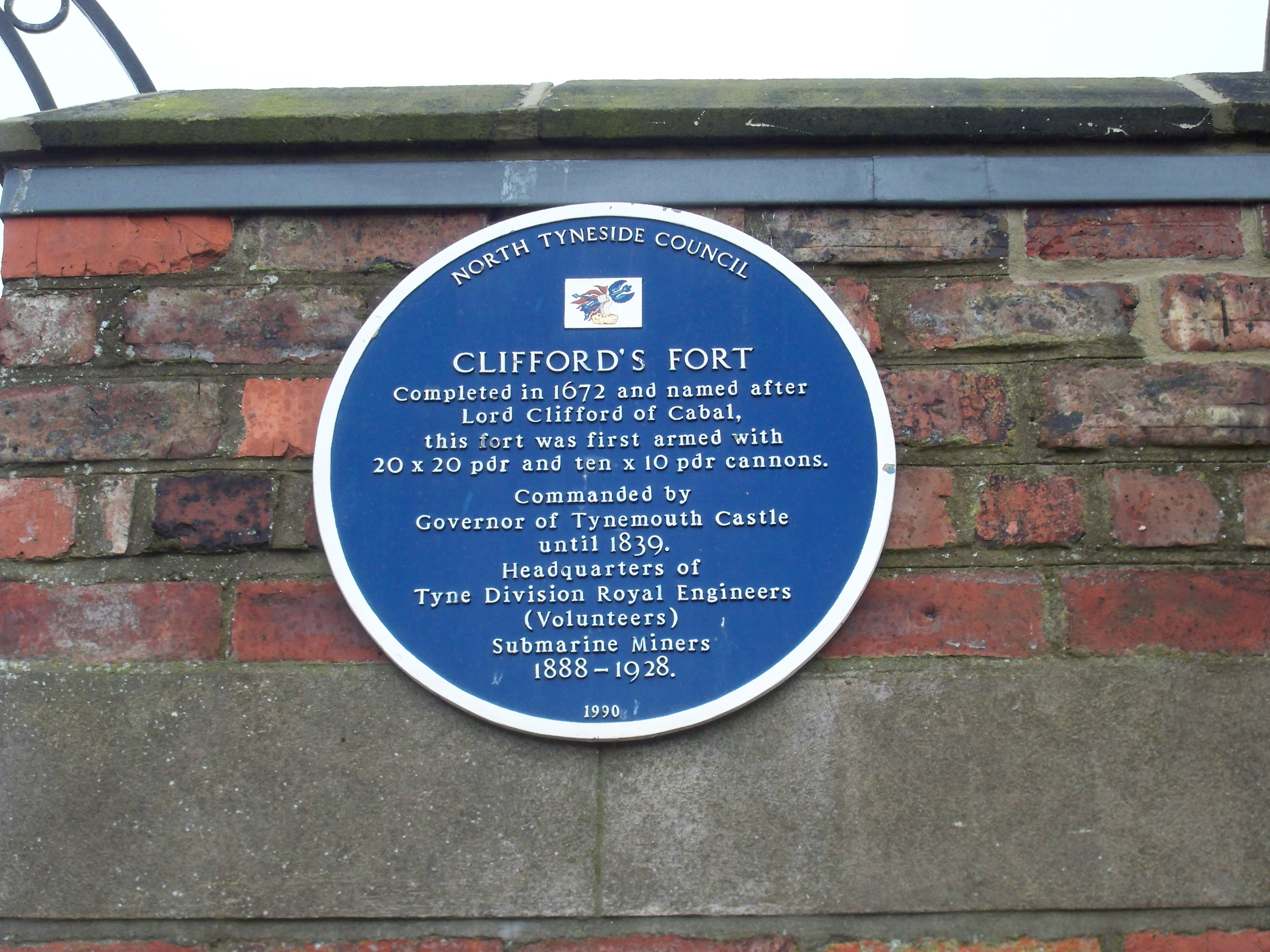
Blue plaque at Clifford's Fort, North Shields, marking the HQ of the Tyne Division Submarine Miners (Volunteers).

The Submarine Mining Service was a branch of the Royal Engineers (RE) tasked with defending Britain's dockyards using fixed mines (also known as 'torpedoes' in the early days) and later electric searchlights. From 1871 the RE formed a number of submarine mining (SM) companies, stationed at defended ports in the UK and around the Empire. 30th Submarine Mining Company at Plymouth acted as the depot company for the Submarine Mining School.

As the commitments of the service expanded the Regular RE companies were supplemented by SM companies (later 'divisions') formed within the Militia. The first was raised in 1878 as the Hampshire Engineers (Submarine Miners) at Gosport, expanded in 1883 to form the Southern Division Submarine Mining Militia of four companies stationed at Portsmouth, Plymouth and Chatham dockyards. By 1892 these had been expanded to 10 divisions covering the main naval dockyards in the UK. A high level committee on RE manpower chaired by Lord Sandhurst in 1885–6 recommended a rapid expansion of the SM service, including the Militia.

A few SM companies were also formed in 1883–4 within Engineer Volunteer Corps (EVCs) of the Volunteer Force. However, the War Office decided in 1886 that the higher standard of training required by submarine miners made it more convenient to treat these companies as separate units, and seven Volunteer SM divisions were formed.

After the submarine mining branch was abolished in 1907, the Regular units were converted into Fortress Companies, the Militia units were disbanded and most of the Volunteer units were reduced to small units working the searchlights for the gun defences. The following year these were incorporated into the Fortress Royal Engineer units of the Territorial Force.

== List of RE Submarine mining units ==
=== Regulars ===
Units formed in the Regular RE:

Title	Formed	Station	Disposal
4th Submarine Mining Company	1887	Gosport and Spithead	4th Fortress Company 1905
21st Submarine Mining Company	1885	Harwich	21st Fortress Company 1905
22nd Submarine Mining Company	1886	Gosport, later Yarmouth, Isle of Wight	22nd Fortress Company 1905
27th Submarine Mining Company	1888	Halifax, Nova Scotia, and Bermuda	27th Fortress Company 1905
28th Submarine Mining Company	1887	Chatham Dockyard and Gravesend, later Malta	28th Fortress Company 1905
30th Submarine Mining Company	1886	Gosport and Spithead	30th Fortress Company 1905
33rd Submarine Mining Company	1888	Cork Harbour	33rd Fortress Company 1905
34th Submarine Mining Company	1885	Malta, later Gravesend	34th Fortress Company 1905
35th Submarine Mining Company	1887	Pembroke Dock	35th Fortress Company 1905
39th Submarine Mining Company	1888	Chatham and Sheerness Dockyard	39th Fortress Company 1905
40th Submarine Mining Company	1888	Halifax, Nova Scotia	40th Fortress Company 1905
48th Submarine Mining Company	1900	Esquimault Dockyard and Victoria, British Columbia	48th Fortress Company 1905

=== Militia ===
Units formed in the Militia:

Title	Formed	Station	Disposal
Hampshire Engineers (Submarine Miners) (Southern Division 1883)	1873	Portsmouth	
1st (Hampshire) Submarine Mining Company	1878	Portsmouth	Portsmouth Division
2nd (Hampshire) Submarine Mining Company			Portsmouth Division
3rd (Devonshire) Submarine Mining Company	1885	Plymouth	Plymouth Division
4th (Kent) Submarine Mining Company	1884	Chatham	Thames and Medway Division
Portsmouth Division	From Hampshire Companies 1888	Gosport	Disbanded 1908
Needles Division	From Portsmouth Division 1894	Fort Victoria, Isle of Wight	Disbanded 1908
Plymouth Division	From Devon Company 1888	Plymouth	Disbanded 1908
Thames & Medway Division	From Kent Company 1888	Chatham	Separate Thames and Medway Divisions 1902
Thames Division	From Thames & Medway Division 1902	Gravesend	Disbanded 1908
Medway Division	From Thames & Medway Division 1902	Sheerness	Disbanded 1908
Harwich Division	1888	Harwich	Disbanded 1908
Milford Haven Division	1888	Pembroke Dock	Disbanded 1908
Severn Division (South Wales & Severn 1889, Western Division 1894)	1888	Pembroke Dock	Disbanded 1908
Humber Division	From Volunteers 1891	Paull-on-Humber	East Riding Fortress Royal Engineers (TF) 1908
Falmouth Division	From Volunteers 1892	Falmouth	Disbanded 1908

=== Volunteers ===
Units formed in the Volunteers:

Title	Formed	Station	Disposal
Severn Division Submarine Miners	1886 from 1st Gloucestershire EVC 1885	Cardiff	Glamorgan Fortress Royal Engineers and Welsh Divisional Telegraph Company 1908
Humber Division Submarine Miners	1886	Hull	To Militia 1891
Tees Division Submarine Miners	1886	Middlesbrough	North Riding Fortress Royal Engineers 1908
Falmouth Division Submarine Miners	1888	Falmouth	To Militia 1891
Forth Division Submarine Miners	1887	Leith	City of Edinburgh (Fortress) Royal Engineers 1908
Tay Division Submarine Miners	1887	Dundee	Disbanded 1907
Tyne Division Submarine Miners	1888 from 1st Newcastle upon Tyne and Durham EVC	North Shields	Durham Fortress Royal Engineers 1908
Clyde Division Submarine Miners	1888 from 2 companies 1st Lanarkshire EVC	Greenock	Renfrewshire Fortress Royal Engineers 1908
Mersey Division Submarine Miners	1888 from K Company 1st Lancashire EVC	Liverpool	Lancashire Fortress Royal Engineers 1908
