= North Riding Fortress Royal Engineers =

North Riding Fortress Royal Engineers 118 Construction Regiment 118 (Tees) Field Squadron
- Active: 1886–1999
- Country: United Kingdom
- Branch: Territorial Army
- Role: Coast Defence; Electrical engineering Field Engineering
- Garrison/HQ: Middlesbrough
- Engagements: Italian Campaign (World War II)

The North Riding (Fortress) Royal Engineers was a volunteer unit of Britain's Royal Engineers formed for the defence of the Tees Estuary in the North Riding of Yorkshire. As well as serving in this role, it also provided specialist engineer units in both World Wars. Its descendants continued to serve in the Territorial Army until 1999.

== Origin ==
When Lieutenant-General Sir Andrew Clarke, Inspector-General of Fortifications 1882–6, did not have enough Regular Royal Engineers (RE) to man the fixed mines being installed to defend British seaports, he utilised the Volunteer Engineers for this task. After successful trials, the system was rolled out to ports around the country, and a new Volunteer company was raised at Middlesbrough on 27 November 1886 to cover the Tees Estuary, entitled Tees Division Submarine Miners. It ranked 5th in the list of volunteer submarine mining divisions, moving up to 4th in 1891 when the Humber Division was converted into Militia. It consisted of two companies with headquarters at Bright Street, Middlesbrough (shared with a section of the Coast Brigade of the Regular RE). The commanding officer was Captain (later Major) John Thomas Belk, a solicitor and local government clerk, who was succeeded by T. Belk in 1898.

By 1907, the War Office had decided to hand all submarine mining duties over to Militia units and the Volunteer submarine miners were converted into electrical engineers to continue manning the electric searchlights of the harbour defences. The Middlesbrough unit was briefly retitled the Tees Division Electrical Engineers.

== Territorial Force ==
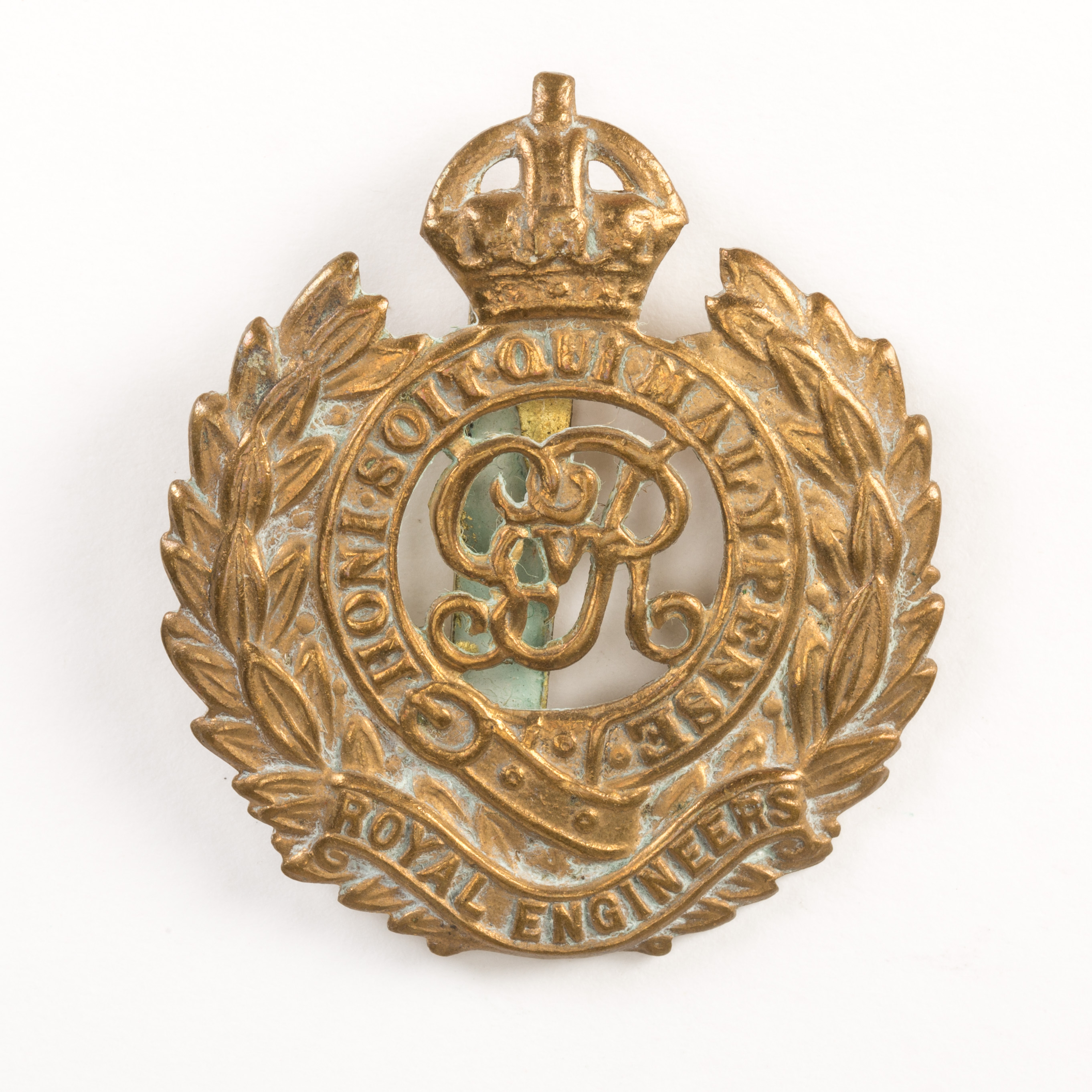
RE Cap badge (King George V cipher).

When the Volunteers were subsumed into the new Territorial Force (TF) under the Haldane Reforms in 1908, the former submarine miners were redesignated again, the Tees Division becoming the North Riding (Fortress) Royal Engineers, with a single Electric Lights Company at Bright Street.

== World War I ==
=== Mobilisation ===
On the outbreak of World War I, the fortress engineers were mobilised and moved into their war stations in the coastal defences, releasing Regular REs for service in the field. Along with the Durham and East Riding Fortress Engineers and the Tyne Electrical Engineers, the North Riding Fortress Engineers formed part of the North Eastern Coastal Defences. When the TF companies of the RE were numbered in February 1917, the unit became 595th North Riding Fortress Company. (Note: Another source suggests that this company was 595 (Tyne) Fortress Company, formed in June 1918 from part of the Regular 16th Fortress Company.)

=== Anti-Aircraft defence ===
As well as operating searchlights for the coastal defence guns, the RE fortress companies began to operate them in the Anti-Aircraft (AA) role as the war progressed and raids by airships and fixed wing bombers became more frequent. The North East coastal towns of England were particularly hard hit by Zeppelins during 1915 and 1916. By mid-1916, the North Riding and East Riding Fortress Engineers had combined to provide the personnel for No 3 (Yorkshire) AA Company, RE. Later, a barrage line of lights was organised up the East Coast with the North Riding Fortress Engineers providing No 36 (North Riding) AA Company at Middlesbrough. By May 1918, the Tees AA Defence Control formed part of Northern Air Defences (NAD). At this stage of the war, the NAD was barely troubled by German raids, and most of the men of medical category A1 had been withdrawn from the AA defences and sent to join the British Expeditionary Force on the Western Front All TF units were demobilised in 1919 after the Armistice with Germany.

== Interwar ==
The North Riding (Fortress) Engineers, consisting of No 1 Electric Light and Works Company, was reformed in the renamed Territorial Army (TA) in 1920, forming part of North Eastern Coastal Defences in 50th (Northumbrian) Divisional Area, with its HQ still at the RE Drill Hall in Bright St, Middlesbrough.

== World War II ==
=== Mobilisation ===
The North Riding Fortress Engineers were mobilised in the Sunderland Coast defences on 3 September 1939. On 13 December 1941, the unit was converted into 541st Electrical and Mechanical Company, RE. Whereas the Royal Electrical and Mechanical Engineers (formed in 1942) maintained vehicles and complex weapons and equipment, the RE's E&M companies worked with heavy electrical engineering plant, such as generators and pumps. In July 1942, the company was assigned to First Army preparing for the landings in Algeria (Operation Torch). It was in North Africa by December.

=== Italian campaign ===
After the completion of the North African campaign, the Allied forces in the Mediterranean moved on to invade Sicily and then mainland Italy. During the Italian campaign, the re-establishment of electric power supplies was critical. Power stations in the south of the country were quickly captured intact, but north of Naples and Foggia the Germans had destroyed everything to do with electricity supply: power stations, sub-stations, hydro-electric dam sluices, transmission lines and pylons were all wrecked. Repair was a collaborative effort of the British Royal Engineers and Royal Navy with US and Italian engineers, under an Electric Power Committee set up in December 1943. Once the Allies reached Rome in mid-1944, they discovered that less than 10 per cent of the 800,000 kW generating capacity of central Italy was in working order. Over the succeeding months, 541st E&M Company was engaged in re-establishing transmission lines, alongside 540th (formerly the Renfrewshire Fortress Engineers), 542nd (formerly East Riding Fortress Engineers), 543rd and 544th (Palestinian) E&M Companies.

The company was disbanded after September 1945.

== Postwar ==
When the TA was reconstituted in 1947, the North Riding Fortress Engineers was reconstituted as:

118 Construction Regiment, RE

- HQ at Middlesbrough
- 308 Construction Squadron
- 541 Construction Squadron
- 542 (East Riding) Construction Squadron at Hull – formerly East Riding Fortress Engineers
- 307 Plant Squadron

The regiment was assigned to 21 Engineer Group. In 1955, 307 Plant Sqn became an independent unit. Then, in a wider reorganisation in 1961, the unit was reorganised as 118 (Tees) Corps Engineer Regiment; 308 and 541 Sqns were disbanded and 542 Sqn was transferred to 129 Corps Engineer Regiment, while 508 Field Sqn was transferred in from 105 Engineer Rgt and a new 333 Field Sqn was formed.

In 1967, the TA was reduced into the Territorial and Army Volunteer Reserve (TAVR), and the regiment became the single 118 (Tees) Field Sqn in 72 (Tyne Electrical Engineers) Engineer Rgt. From 1976 to 1982, 118 Sqn had the role of supporting the Royal Air Force's Hawker Siddeley Harriers. The squadron was finally disbanded when 72 Rgt was reduced to a single air support squadron in 1999.

== Honorary Commandant ==
- Major J. T. Belk, the former commanding officer, was appointed Honorary Lieutenant-Colonel Commandant of the Tees Division Submarine Miners on 25 May 1898.

== External sources ==
- British Army units from 1945 on
- Mark Conrad, The British Army in 1914.
- The Long, Long Trail
- Graham Watson, The Territorial Army 1947
