= Renfrewshire Fortress Royal Engineers =

Renfrewshire Fortress Royal Engineers 102 Regiment Royal Engineers
- Active: 1888–1967
- Country: United Kingdom
- Branch: Territorial Army
- Role: Coast Defence; Field Engineering; Electrical engineering
- Garrison/HQ: Fort Matilda, Greenock
- Engagements: World War I: Somme; Arras; Passchedaele; German spring offensive; Hundred Days Offensive; World War II: Italian Campaign

The Renfrewshire Fortress Royal Engineers was a Scottish volunteer unit of the British Army under various titles from 1888. Its main role was the defence of the ports and shipyards on the River Clyde, but it also provided detachments for active service in the field during both World Wars. Its successors continue to serve in the Army Reserve.

== Submarine miners ==
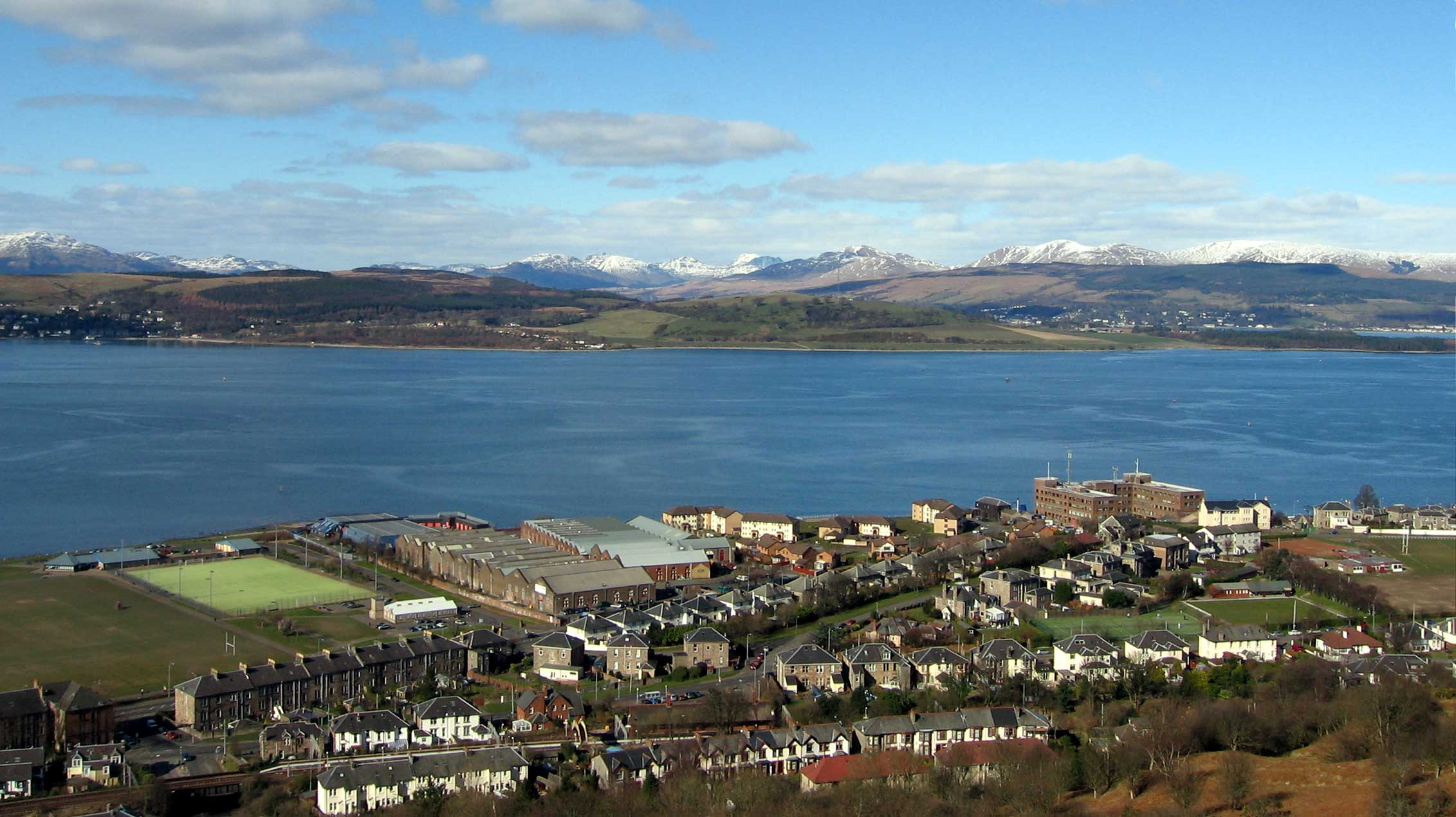
The Fort Matilda area of Greenock, with the River Clyde behind

Lieutenant-General Sir Andrew Clarke, Inspector-General of Fortifications 1882–6, did not have enough Regular Royal Engineers (RE) to man the fixed mines being installed to defend British ports. He decided to utilise the Volunteer Engineers for this task and, after successful trials the system, it was rolled out to ports around the country. In 1885, the 1st Lanarkshire Engineer Volunteer Corps in Glasgow formed No 9 (Submarine Mining) Company and raised a second company of submarine miners in early 1888. The submarine mining establishment for the River Clyde was established at Greenock in Renfrewshire. It occupied Fort Matilda (first built in 1814 to defend the Port of Glasgow), which later had quick-firing guns and searchlights installed to cover the minefield between Greenock and Kilcreggan.

In March 1888, the War Office decided to constitute the submarine miners as separate 'divisions' within the Volunteer Engineers. Thus, the two Lanarkshire companies became the Clyde Division, Engineer Volunteers, Submarine Miners, RE, with its headquarters at Fort Matilda. The first honorary commandant was Col Sir Donald Matheson, who had been commander of the 1st Lanarkshire Engineers since 1865. The new unit took its precedence from the 1st Lanarkshire (1860) and ranked third in the list of Submarine Miners. Two more companies were raised, in 1892 and 1900 respectively. In 1901, the unit was redesignated the Clyde Division, Submarine Miners, R.E. (V) at Greenock. In 1903, its establishment was reduced to three companies. At the Royal review of 1905, Clyde Division had 10 officers and 175 other ranks.

== Territorial Force ==
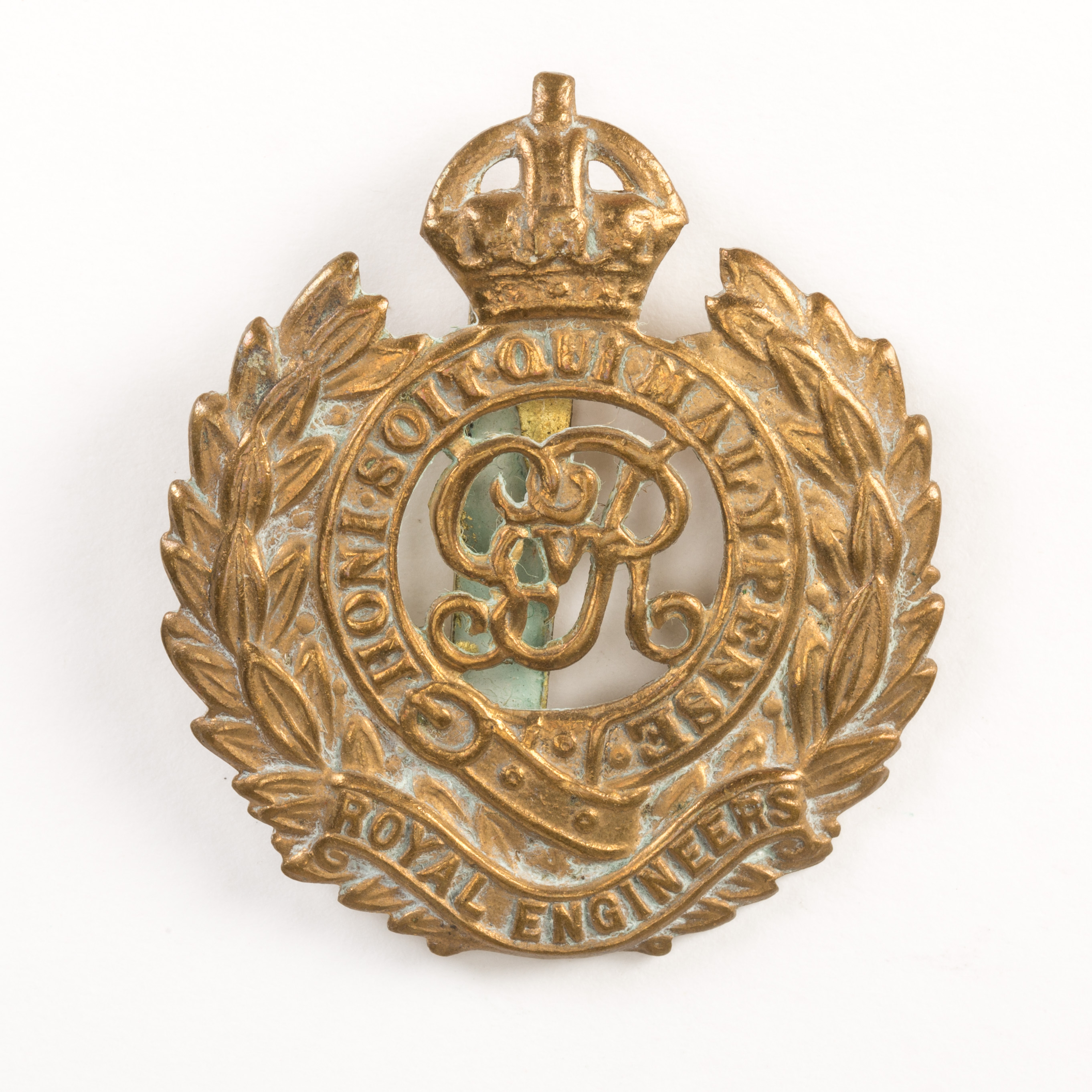
RE Cap badge (King George V cipher)

In 1907, the War Office decided to hand over all submarine mining duties to the Royal Navy and the Clyde Division was reduced to a single company of 4 officers and 70 other ranks (ORs) and redesignated as Electrical Engineers to make wider use of the coast defence searchlights that had been used to illuminate the minefields. Thus, the Greenock unit became the Clyde Division (Electrical Engineers) (Volunteers), but the Haldane Reforms came into effect the following year, under which all the Volunteers were subsumed into the Territorial Force (TF). The Clyde Division was retitled as the Renfrewshire (Fortress) Royal Engineers, part of the Scottish Coastal Defences, and ranked ninth in the list of Fortress Engineers.

By World War I, its organisation was as follows:
Renfrewshire (Fortress) Royal Engineers

- HQ at Fort Matilda, Greenock
- No 1 Works Company at Paisley
- No 2 Electric Lights Company at Greenock

== World War I ==
=== Mobilisation ===
On the outbreak of war on 4 August 1914, the Renfrewshire Fortress Engineers mobilised and moved into their war stations. Shortly afterwards, the men of the TF were invited to volunteer for Overseas Service and WO instructions were issued to form those men who had only signed up for Home Service into reserve or 2nd Line units. The titles of these 2nd Line units were the same as the original, but distinguished by a '2/' prefix. They absorbed most of the recruits that flooded in. Britain's harbour defences were never seriously tested during the war, but the fortress engineers formed companies for service with the armies in the field. During 1915, the Greenock unit formed 1/1st Renfrewshire Field Company R.E. (T) composed of 1st Line Territorials.

The 2/1st Renfrew appears to have been incorporated into 408th (Highland) Reserve Field Company, the reserve unit for 51st (Highland) Division's divisional engineers, but did not proceed overseas, and was probably absorbed into the central training organisation.

=== Egypt ===
1/1st Renfrewshire Field Company, R.E. (T) was attached to 69th (2nd East Anglian) Division at Thetford from 16 November until 19 December 1915. It then embarked at Plymouth and sailed for Egypt as part of the Egyptian Expeditionary Force. On 10 December 1915, Capt Hodgart was in temporary command. Disembarking at Port Said on 3–5 January 1916, it was allotted to 'Army Troops', working on the Suez Canal Defences. The company arrived at El Kubri, Egypt on 15 January 1916 and was immediately attached to the 10th Indian Division.

The 10th Indian Division (two brigades only) was already on the canal with its single field company of engineers when it was augmented by the 1/1st Renfrewshire Field Company and the 1/1st City of Edinburgh Field Company. The former left a detachment at El Kubri and moved to Ayun Musa on 19 January. The company worked on the canal defences, water supply and the light railway from Quarantine upon its arrival at Ayun Musa. The 1/1st City of Edinburgh Field Company, one of the few engineer units to be over establishment, began an outpost line for one and a half battalions astride the track to Nekhl.

In the 10th Indian Division's sub-section of the canal defence system, the 1/1st Renfrewshire Field Company continued work on the defences in the rocky ground near Ayun Musa, and on water supply and light railway work right into March 1916. On 8 March 1916, the Company moved to Esh Shatt to lay light railways, install water storage facilities in the forward defence posts and to construct defences there and at the Quarantine bridgehead. On 12 March, the company was detached from the 10th Indian Division. Major Hordern assumed command of the company on 12 April 1916. The company received orders to leave Egypt for the Western Front in Europe and sailed to join the British Expeditionary Force (BEF) in France. They embarked at Alexandria on 17 April 1916 bound for France, disembarking at Marseille on 24 April. They were assigned to 4th Division on 2 May 1916 and redesignated the 1st (Renfrew) Field Company, R.E, remaining with that formation on the Western Front for the rest of the war. The unit strength at that time was 6 Officers, 231 Other Ranks, 8 animals and 21 vehicles.

=== Somme ===
4th Division was a Regular Army formation, part of the original BEF, and had been serving in the Western Front since August 1914. 1st (Renfrew) Fd Coy joined it in time to take part in the bloody Battle of the Somme 1–13 July 1916. Under orders issued by VIII Corps, the divisional RE was not intended to take part in the initial assault on 1 July 1916; one section of a company was placed at the disposal of the commander of each assaulting brigade, but was not to be ordered forward until the objective had been gained. The remainder of the RE were held back to work on improving forward roads and water supply, and then to consolidate strongpoints at night. The division sustained disastrous losses in its assault; although the leading troops penetrated the strongpoint known as 'The Quadrilateral', the following waves came under heavy fire. Under cover of darkness, the battle front was cleared – the engineers assisting in bringing in the wounded – and defences were reorganised, but the Quadrilateral had to be abandoned the following morning. In the middle of the Somme battle, Major Hordern was admitted to hospital and Capt Hodgart assumed command of the Coy. 4th Division went back into action later in the Somme offensive, at the Battle of the Transloy Ridges (10–18 October), with little better success. Capt Hodgart commanded the Fd Coy through the battle of Le Transloy before promotion in the field to the substantive rank of Major on 20 December 1916.

=== Arras and Ypres ===
In February 1917, the TF RE companies were allocated numbers in sequence with the Regulars; 1st (Renfrew) Fd Coy became 406th (Renfrew) Field Company. During 1917 the 4th Division took part in the Battle of Arras (First and Third Battles of the Scarpe, 8–14 April and 3–4 May), and the later stages of the Third Ypres Offensive. These were the successful attacks at Polygon Wood, 28 September–3 October, and Broodseinde, 4 October, followed by the terrible actions at Poelcappelle, 9 October, and the First Battle of Passchendaele, 12 October, where the division made some advances despite the mud.

=== Battles of 1918 ===
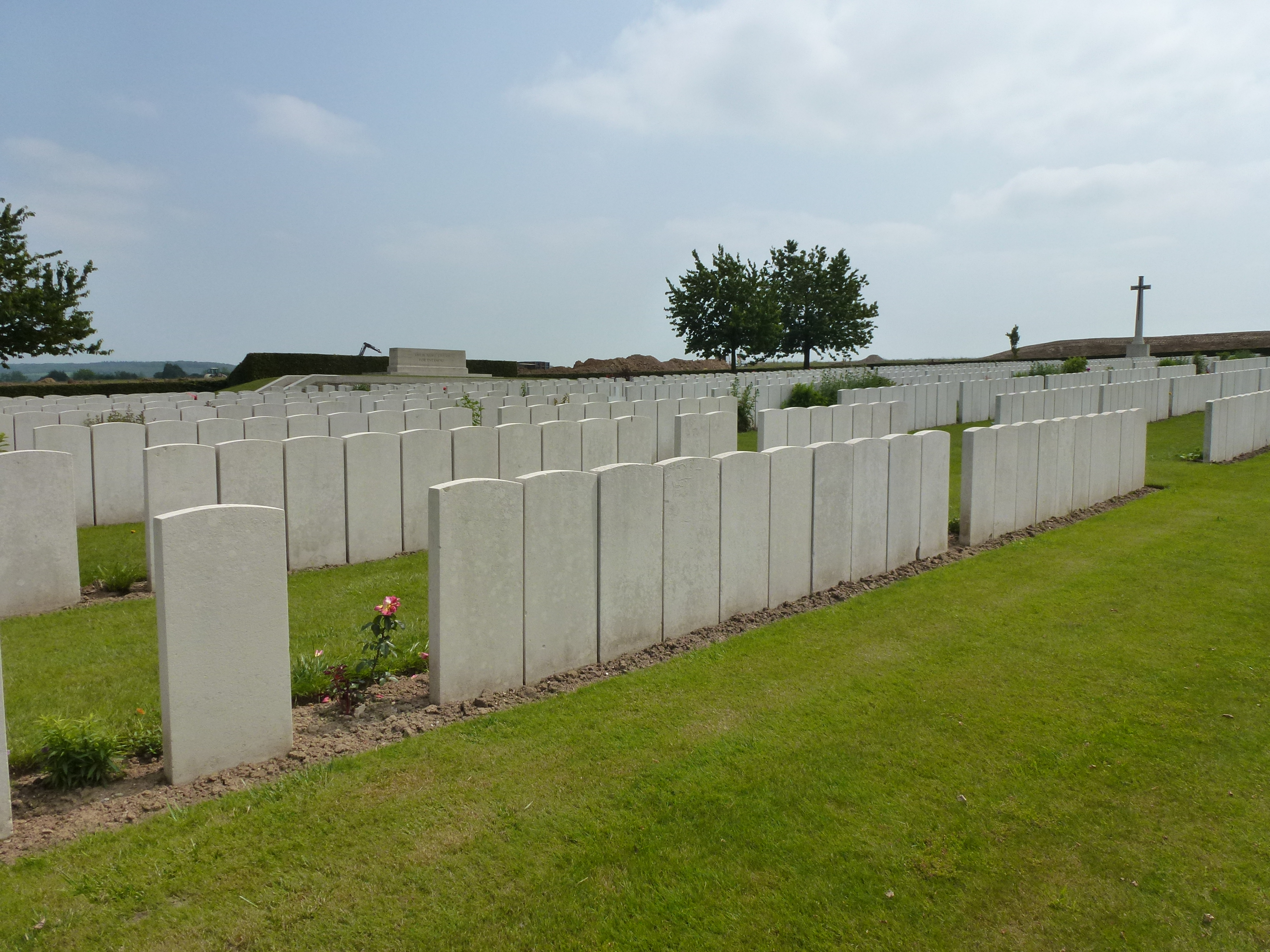
Pernes British Cemetery at Pernes, Pas-de-Calais, which contains burials of 406th (Renfrew) Field Company and other 4th Divisional Engineers who died in the fighting of April 1918.

The 4th Division was defending positions in front of Arras when the second phase of the German spring offensive (Operation Mars) struck on 28 March 1918. After stout defence by the British troops, the attacks petered out in the afternoon, and the German operation was a complete failure. When the Germans renewed their offensive (Operation Georgette), the 4th Division was involved in the defence of Hinges Ridge during the Battle of Hazebrouck and then the repulse of the German breakthrough towards Béthune.

During the Allied Hundred Days Offensive, 4th Division fought as part of the Canadian Corps in the Battle of the Scarpe and the Battle of the Drocourt-Quéant Line. It then reverted to the British XXII Corps for the rest of the war. For the Battle of the Canal du Nord, the Division constructed dummy figures made of painted canvas on wooden frames to represent an advance in No Man's Land. While its neighbouring division put in a genuine assault on 27 September, 4th Division fired a barrage and pulled up these figures. Then, that night, the divisional engineers constructed a bridge across the Trinquis and 4th Division established posts across the river. The Battle of the Selle involved another major assault bridging operation, and the pursuit of the defeated Germans entailed much bridging of destroyed culverts and cratered roads left by the enemy.

4th Division's last operation of the war was the Battle of Valenciennes on 1 and 2 November, and it remained in the area of that city after the Armistice with Germany came into force on 11 November. In January 1919, it moved to the Binche–La Louvière area for demobilisation. 406th Field Company remained on the Continent until at least June 1919.

=== Anti-Aircraft defence ===
In addition to operating searchlights for the coastal defence guns, the RE fortress companies began to utilise them in the Anti-Aircraft (AA) role. As the war progressed, and raids by airships and fixed wing bombers became more frequent, the RE formed specialist AA Searchlight Companies. In December 1916, the Renfrewshire Fortress Company formed No 33 (Renfrew) AA Company at Glasgow, taking over an existing number from an AA company previously operated in Northumberland by the Tyne Electrical Engineers. In January 1918, the AA defences were reorganised and RE searchlight personnel were attached to AA gun companies of the Royal Garrison Artillery.

== Interwar ==
Postwar, the Renfrewshire Fortress Engineers were reformed in the reconstituted Territorial Amy (TA), consisting of two companies at Fort Matilda. The unit was designated as Coast Defence Troops in 52nd (Lowland) Divisional Area.

In 1920, the 406th Field Company was redesignated as the 238th Highland (County of Renfrew) Field Coy RE, a 1st line TA Unit based in Paisley. They were part of the 51st (Highland) Divisional Engineers that were reconstituted as part of the changes. The HQRE and 236th Field Company were based in Aberdeen, the 237th Field Company was in Dundee and the 238th Field Company was at the Drill Hall, Whitehaugh Avenue, Paisley.

== World War II ==
=== Mobilisation ===
On the outbreak of World War II, the unit's organisation was as follows:
Renfrewshire Fortress Engineers, RE

- HQ at Fort Matilda, Greenock
- No 1 (Electric Light and Works) Company at Greenock
- No 2 (Electric Light and Works) Company at Greenock

The unit formed part of the Clyde Coast Defences during the early part of the war. On 5 December 1940, one company was converted into 540th Electrical and Mechanical Company, RE, in the War Office Reserve, earmarked for overseas service.

=== Italy ===
540th E&M Company served in the Italian Campaign 1943–5. During the campaign, the re-establishment of electric power supplies was critical. Power stations in the south of the country were quickly captured intact, but north of Naples and Foggia the Germans had destroyed everything to do with electricity supply: power stations, sub-stations, hydro-electric dam sluices, transmission lines and pylons were all wrecked. Repair was a collaborative effort of the British Royal Engineers and Royal Navy with US and Italian engineers, under an Electric Power Committee set up in December 1943. Once the Allies reached Rome in mid-1944, they discovered that less than 10 per cent of the 800,000 kW generating capacity of central Italy was in working order. Over the succeeding months, 540th E&M Company was engaged in re-establishing transmission lines, alongside 541st (formerly the North Riding Fortress Engineers), 542nd (formerly East Riding Fortress Engineers), 543rd and 544th (Palestinian) E&M Companies.

The company was disbanded after September 1945.

== Postwar ==
The Renfrewshire Fortress Engineers were reformed in the TA in 1947 as 102 Construction Regiment, RE, with the following organisation:

- HQ at Paisley
- 238 Construction Squadron
- 243 Construction Squadron
- 276 Construction Squadron
- 540 Plant Squadron

The regiment was assigned to 20 Engineer Group in Scottish Command. 243 Construction Squadron was converted into the independent 243 (Rutherglen) Bomb Disposal Sqn in 1950, but was disbanded in 1967. 276 Construction Sqn was converted into a Plant Sqn in 1956 and transferred to 143 Plant Regiment.

Also in 1947, the Renfrewshire Fortess Engineers formed the following port squadrons at Glasgow:

- 329 Port Operating Sqn
- 330 Port Operating Sqn
- 331 Crane Operating Sqn
- 332 Crane Operating Sqn

These were assigned to a new 80 Port Regiment, RE in 1956, and 330 and 332 squadrons were disbanded in 1961. The regiment formed part of 264 (Scottish) Beach Brigade, later 4 Port Task Force, RE. It was transferred to the Royal Corps of Transport in 1965.

In 1961, 102 Regiment was reorganised as 102 (Renfrew) Corps Engineer Regiment, RE. 276 Sqn returned as a Field Squadron and 540 converted to a Field Park Squadron, while 238 Construction Sqn became an independent squadron at Glasgow.

When the TA was reduced into the Territorial and Army Volunteer Reserve (TAVR) in 1967, the regiment became 102 (Clyde) Fd Sqn RE (V). Its HQ remained at Paisley and it formed part of 71 (Scottish) Engineer Regiment. In 1999, 71 (Scottish) Engineer Regt was merged with 72 and 76 Engineer Regts, with the new unit titled 71 Engineer Regiment (Volunteers). Following the amalgamation, 102 (Clyde) Fd Sqn RE (V) was an Air Support Squadron, providing military engineering and infrastructure support to the Royal Air Force. Since the Strategic Defence and Security Review 2010, the Squadron has been named 102 Field Squadron Royal Engineers and has been based at Anzio Lines, Paisley, as a plant squadron and part of 71 Engineer Regiment.

== Honorary Commandant ==
The following officers were appointed Honorary Commandant of the Clyde Submarine Miners:

- Brigadier-General Sir Donald Matheson, KCB, VD, commander of the Clyde Volunteer Brigade, appointed 25 February 1888.
- Colonel Edward Malcolm, CB, 16th Laird of Poltalloch, appointed 29 May 1901.

== Online sources ==
- British Army Website
- British Army units from 1945 on
- British Military History
- Commonwealth War Graves Commission
- Great War Forum
- Orders of Battle at Patriot Files
- Land Forces of Britain, the Empire and Commonwealth (Regiments.org)
- RE Museum
- Secret Scotland
- Ubique.com
