= East Riding Fortress Royal Engineers =

East Riding Fortress Royal Engineers 542 (East Riding) Construction Squadron 129 (East Riding) Field Squadron
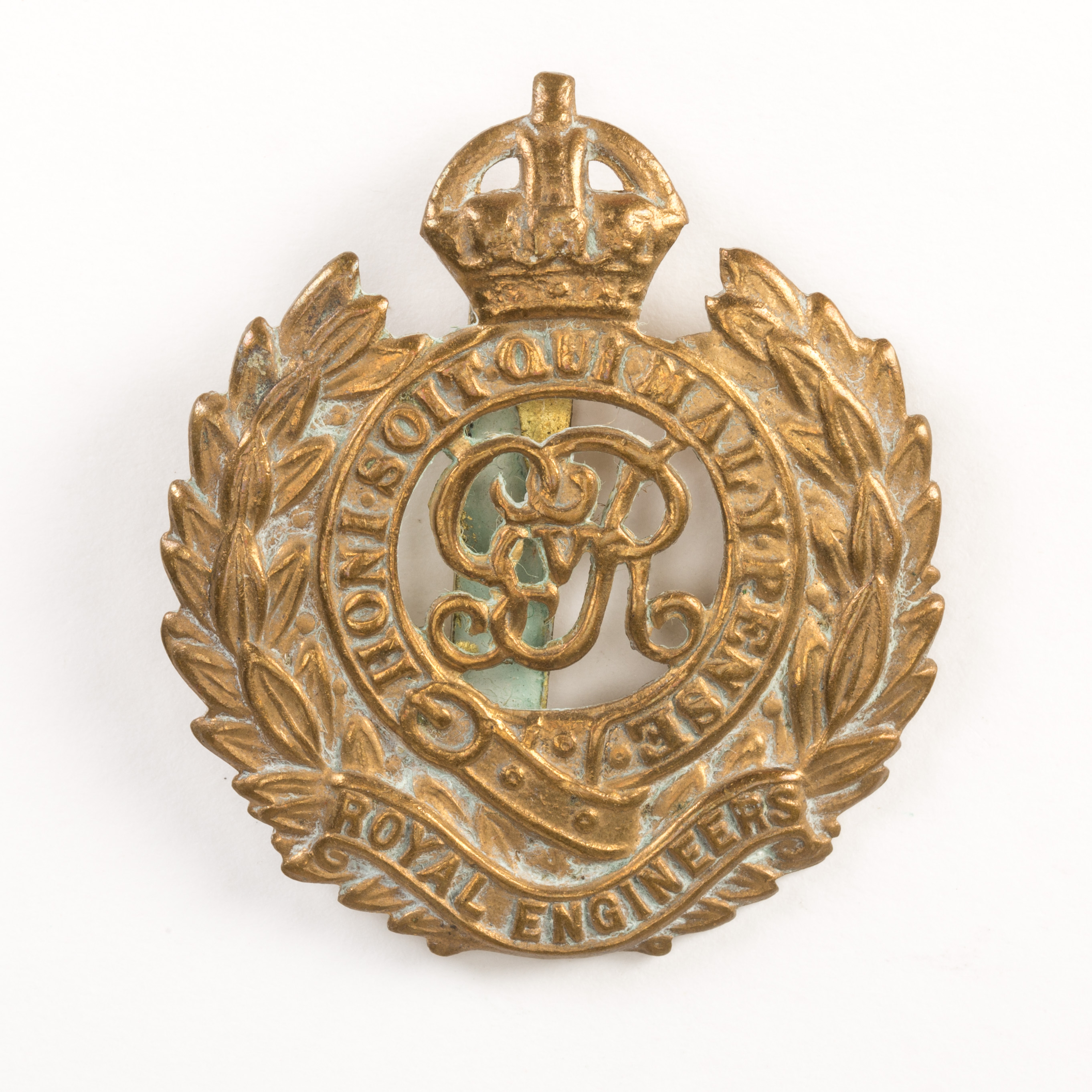
- RE Cap badge (King George V cipher)
- Active: 1908–1991
- Country: United Kingdom
- Branch: Territorial Army
- Role: Coast Defence; Field Engineering; Electrical engineering
- Garrison/HQ: Hull
- Engagements: First World War: Battle of the Somme; Battle of Arras; Third Battle of Ypres; German spring offensive; Hundred Days Offensive; Second World War: North Africa; Italy

The East Riding (Fortress) Royal Engineers was a volunteer unit of Britain's Royal Engineers formed for the defence of the Humber Estuary in the East Riding of Yorkshire. As well as serving in this role it also provided field and specialist engineer units in both World Wars. Its successors continued to serve in the Territorial Army until 1991.

== Precursor unit ==
As early as 1870 a government defence committee recommended that coastal artillery batteries defending British seaports should be supplemented by fixed minefields fired electrically from the shore, but it was not until the 1880s that this was acted upon. Lieutenant-General Sir Andrew Clarke, the Inspector-General of Fortifications 1882–6, found that he did not have enough Regular Royal Engineers (RE) to man these additional defences, so he utilised the Volunteer Engineers for this task. After successful trials, the system was rolled out to ports around the country. In 1886, a meeting held at the instigation of Sir Albert Rollit agreed to form a corps of Volunteer Submarine Miners in Hull to man the defences of the Humber Estuary. The new company was entitled the Humber Division Submarine Miners and comprised 60 men, many of them highly skilled craftsmen attracted by the considerably higher pay during training periods than was offered to other Volunteer units. The first officers' commissions were issued on 11 September 1886 and the corps ranked 4th in the list of submarine miners.

The company was accommodated in Hull adjacent to the 2nd East Riding Artillery Volunteers' Wenlock Barracks, and High Paull House, close to Fort Paull in the coastal village of Paull, was altered to house the unit's equipment. The unit soon expanded to a strength of three companies, but in 1891 the War Office decided that some of the submarine mining defences would be better served by the Militia. The Humber Submarine Miners were disbanded the following year and reconstituted as a militia unit, but many of the Volunteers resigned rather than transfer to more onerous terms of service.

== Territorial Force ==
When the Volunteers were subsumed into the new Territorial Force (TF) under the Haldane Reforms in 1908, the remaining submarine miners were converted into fortress engineers, but in the case of the Humber defences a completely new unit had to be raised. It was entitled the East Riding (Fortress) Royal Engineers, with its HQ at Colonial Street, Hull, and consisted of No 1 Works Company and No 2 Electric Lights Company, which operated searchlights for the coastal guns.

== First World War ==
=== Mobilisation ===
On the outbreak of the First World War, the TF was mobilised and the fortress engineers took up their war stations in the North Eastern Coast Defences. TF units were invited to volunteer for Overseas Service and, on 15 August 1914, the War Office issued instructions to separate those men who had signed up for Home Service only, and form these into reserve units. On 31 August, the formation of a reserve or 2nd Line unit was authorised for each 1st Line unit (prefixed '1/') where 60 per cent or more of the men had volunteered for Overseas Service.

Although the East Coast was attacked by the German High Seas Fleet on 16 December 1914 (the Raid on Scarborough, Hartlepool and Whitby) and again on 24 April 1916 (the Bombardment of Yarmouth and Lowestoft), and was regularly bombed by Zeppelin airships, the fortress engineers were nevertheless able to release 1st Line men to provide 1/1st East Riding Field Company, RE for active service in the field. A 581st (Humber) Fortress Company was also formed, about which little is known.

=== 1/1st East Riding Field Company ===
The company embarked for France on 17 September 1915, and three days later it joined the Regular 3rd Division serving with the British Expeditionary Force (BEF) on the Western Front. They were just in time to participate in the Second British attack at Bellewaarde in the Ypres Salient, a subsidiary action to the Battle of Loos.

Subsequently, the company was part of 3rd Division in the following engagements:

==== 1916 ====
- Ypres Salient
  - Actions of St. Eloi Craters
  - Gas attacks at Wulverghem
- Battle of the Somme
  - Battle of Bazentin Ridge
  - Battle of Delville Wood
  - Battle of the Ancre

==== 1917 ====
When the TF engineers were numbered in February 1917, the company became 529th (East Riding) Field Company, RE.

- Battle of Arras
  - First Battle of the Scarpe
  - Second Battle of the Scarpe
  - Battle of Arleux
  - Third Battle of the Scarpe
  - Capture of Rœux
- Third Ypres Offensive
  - Battle of the Menin Road Ridge
  - Battle of Polygon Wood

==== 1918 ====
- German spring offensive
  - Battle of St Quentin
  - First Battle of Bapaume
  - Battle of Arras
  - Battle of Estaires
  - Battle of Hazebrouck
  - Battle of Bethune
- Allied Hundred Days Offensive
  - Battle of Albert
  - Second Battle of Bapaume
  - Battle of the Canal du Nord
  - Battle of Cambrai
  - Battle of the Selle

After the Armistice, 3rd Division entered Germany as part of the Occupation of the Rhineland. TF troops were progressively demobilised, with 529th (ER) Fd Co disbanding about September 1919.

=== Anti-aircraft defence ===
As well as operating searchlights for the coastal defence guns, the RE fortress companies began to operate them in the anti-aircraft (AA) role as the war progressed and raids by airships and fixed wing bombers became more frequent. The North East coastal towns of England were particularly hard hit by Zeppelins during 1915 and 1916, and by mid-1916, the East Riding and North Riding Fortress Engineers had combined to provide the personnel for No 3 (Yorkshire) AA Company, RE. Later, a barrage line of lights was organised up the East Coast with the East Riding Fortress Engineers providing No 39 AA Company at Killingholme, while Hull was protected by No 38 AA Company and East Riding personnel guarding Sheffield were relieved by No 40 AA Company, both manned by the Tyne Electrical Engineers. By May 1918, this formed part of Northern Air Defences (NAD). At this stage of the war, the NAD was barely troubled by German raids, and most of the men of medical category A1 had been withdrawn from the AA defences and sent to join the British Expeditionary Force on the Western Front All TF units were demobilised in 1919 after the Armistice with Germany.

== Interwar ==
The East Riding (Fortress) Engineers, consisting of No 1 (Works) and Nos 2 and 3 (Lights) Companies, was reformed in the renamed Territorial Army (TA) in 1920, forming part of North Eastern Coastal Defences in 50th (Northumbrian) Divisional Area, with its HQ still at Colonial St, Hull. However, by 1939, it had been reduced to a single Electric Light and Works company.

== Second World War ==
=== Mobilisation ===
The East Riding Fortress Engineers were mobilised in the Humber Coast defences on 3 September 1939. Some time after December 1941, the unit was converted into 542nd Electrical and Mechanical Company, RE. Whereas the Royal Electrical and Mechanical Engineers (formed in 1942) maintained vehicles and complex weapons and equipment, the RE's E&M companies worked with heavy electrical engineering plant, such as generators and pumps. In December 1942, the company landed in North Africa with First Army (Operation Torch), transferring to Allied Forces Headquarters in February 1943. Later in the year, it moved to Italy.

=== Italy ===
During the Italian Campaign, the re-establishment of electric power supplies was critical. Power stations in the south of the country were quickly captured intact, but north of Naples and Foggia the Germans had destroyed everything to do with electricity supply: power stations, sub-stations, hydro-electric dam sluices, transmission lines and pylons were all wrecked. Repair was a collaborative effort of the British Royal Engineers and Royal Navy with US and Italian engineers, under an Electric Power Committee set up in December 1943. Once the Allies reached Rome, in mid-1944, they discovered that less than 10 per cent of the 800,000 kW generating capacity of central Italy was in working order. Over the succeeding months, 542nd E&M Company was engaged in re-establishing transmission lines, alongside 540th (formerly the Renfrewshire Fortress Engineers), 541st (formerly the North Riding Fortress Engineers), 543rd and 544th (Palestinian) E&M Companies.

The company was disbanded after September 1945.

== Postwar ==
When the TA was reconstituted in 1947, the East Riding Fortress Engineers were reformed as 542 (East Riding) Construction Squadron in 118 Construction Regiment (itself descended from the North Riding Fortress Engineers).

When the TA was reorganised in 1961, 542 Sqn was transferred as a field squadron to 129 Corps Engineer Regiment. Then, when the TA was converted into the TAVR in 1967, 129 Regt was reduced to a single 129 (East Riding) Field Squadron based at Hull, and included in a new 72 (Tyne Electrical Engineers) Engineer Regiment. In 1977, the squadron was transferred again, this time to 73 Engineer Regiment. Finally, it was broken up in April 1991, with part going to the Humber Artillery Company of 2nd Battalion Yorkshire Volunteers, and part to 131 Commando Squadron Royal Engineers.

129 Field Sqn was reformed in April 2006, but disbanded again in 2014 under the 'Army 2020' proposals, when 73 Engineer Rgt was reduced to a single squadron.

== Prominent members ==
- The Scottish archaeologist Charles S. T. Calder served with 529th (East Riding) Field Company towards the end of the First World War.

== External sources ==
- British Army units from 1945 on
- Mark Conrad, The British Army in 1914.
- Fort Paull website
- Great War Forum
- The Long, Long Trail
- RE Museum
- Sappers site
