= Submarine Mining Service =

British engineering military unit

- Active: 1871–1906
- Country: United Kingdom
- Branch: British Army
- Type: Harbour defence
- Part of: Corps of Royal Engineers

The Submarine Mining Service was a branch of the British Army's Corps of Royal Engineers between 1871 and 1906. They were responsible for defending ports and rivers by naval mines and torpedoes. Overseas detachments served in British colonies and dominions. The service disbanded after the Committee of Imperial Defence considered that harbour defence duties were better suited to the submarine fleet of the Royal Navy.

== History ==
The Submarine Mining Service was established at Chatham, Kent, in 1871 as a branch of the British Army's Corps of Royal Engineers. Its role was to assist in the defence of strategically important river mouths and ports by the use of naval mines and torpedoes. The unit was initially equipped with former mortar boats of Crimean War vintage and 42-foot-long (13 m) former Royal Navy tugs and pinnaces, the latter of which could deploy mines but not recover them. From 1875 they were issued with purpose-built vessels, the first of which were the 65-foot-long (20 m) Miner class. By 1898 the service had 67 vessels ranging in size from 20 tons to 125 tons in displacement.

The Submarine Mining Service was organised as a single battalion from 1884 but as independent companies from 1892. Its members were trained initially at the Royal Engineers school, Gillingham, and later at new schools in Portsmouth and Plymouth. The flag of the Submarine Mining Service was a Blue Ensign with the unit's badge of a hand rising from mural crown, grasping a thunderbolt.

Former commander, Lieutenant-Colonel William Baker-Brown, said that "the Submarine Mining Service was remarkable for the cheapness and efficiency of its organisation and its success in enlisting the services of a body of auxiliary corps drawn from many nationalities and under many conditions of service". Despite this, in the early 20th century the Committee of Imperial Defence recommended the service's abolition as they determined the defence of British ports was best achieved by submarines of the Royal Navy, such as the newly introduced Holland-class, A-class and B-class vessels. In 1906 the British branch of the Submarine Mining Service disbanded and the role of harbour defence transferred to the navy. This led to similar disbandments of Submarine Mining Service units overseas such as in Canada, Australia and New Zealand.

== In South and East Asia ==
Overseas detachments of the Submarine Mining Service were established in the British colonies of Hong Kong, Ceylon and Singapore in 1878. The three units gathered regularly at Singapore for joint exercises. From 1886 the three units were combined into the Eastern Battalion of Submarine Miners for organisational purposes. Originally Asian personnel were not permitted to join, though the Hong Kong unit maintained unofficial assistants of Chinese origin. From 1890 Malay men were permitted to enlist in the battalion and from August 1891 men of Chinese origin were allowed. By 1900 men of Chinese origin made up around half of the 179 enlisted men in the Hong Kong unit.

George Macdonogh

The Chinese enlisted personnel were given ranks based on those used in the British Indian Army (the highest holding subedar rank) and were paid on approximately the same basis as Indian troops. The Chinese members of the Submarine Mining Service wore a uniform similar to that of Chinese members of the Hong Kong Police Force: lightweight light-blue-coloured garments worn with a bamboo coolie hat. The uniform had been designed by Lieutenant-General George Macdonogh as a young subaltern commanding the unit in 1891 and based on that worn by the contemporary Imperial Chinese Army. The Hong Kong submarine mining company was described by the Hong Kong Telegraph in 1896 as the only company of the British Army to wear a silk uniform. This was likely incorrect with the material used probably "Cantonese gauze", a material resembling silk but more durable.

Six Chinese members of the Hong Kong company participated in the London celebrations of the Diamond Jubilee of Queen Victoria in 1897 and the same number in the 1902 Coronation of Edward VII and Alexandra. In 1900 a lieutenant, three European enlisted men and fifteen Chinese enlisted men participated in the Gaselee Expedition to relieve the Siege of the International Legations in Peking during the Boxer Rebellion. The foreign units of the service were relatively cheap to maintain; the Hong Kong company cost £580 in 1906, around one-thousandth of the cost of the British garrison.

== See also ==
- Submarine mining units of the Royal Engineers
