= Controlled mines =

A controlled mine was a circuit fired weapon used in coastal defenses with ancestry going back to 1805 when Robert Fulton termed his underwater explosive device a torpedo:

Robert Fulton invented the word torpedo to describe his underwater explosive device and successfully destroyed a ship in 1805. In the 1840s Samuel Colt began experimenting with underwater mines fired by electric current and in 1842, he blew up an old schooner in the Potomac River from a shore station five miles away.

== History ==
"Torpedoes" were in use during the American Civil War when such devices were made famous with the order given by David Farragut at Mobile Bay. After that war similar mines were being contemplated or put into use by other nations.

In 1869 the United States Army Corps of Engineers was directed by Secretary of War William Belknap to assume responsibility for torpedoes for coastal defense. That responsibility continued through the formation of the U.S. Torpedo Service as part of the United States' seacoast defenses. In the United States, modern naval mine development began in 1869 at the Engineer School of Application under Major Henry Larcom Abbot at Willets Point, New York. Eventually, after calls for "rifled cannon" to cover the torpedo fields became reality, that service and the Corps of Engineers turned over responsibility to the newly formed coast artillery branch in 1901, which became the U.S. Army Coast Artillery Corps in 1907.

The terms "mine" and "torpedo" were used interchangeably until modern usage began separating the term with "mine" applied to static explosive devices and "torpedo" to self-propelled or "locomotive torpedo" weapons. Even during the Spanish–American War the interchangeable terms caused confusion.

In Britain controlled mines were termed submarine mines. Fixed minefields to defend harbours were the responsibility of the Royal Engineers (RE), which formed special companies of Submarine Miners to maintain them. Lieutenant-General Sir Andrew Clarke, Inspector-General of Fortifications 1882–86, found that he did not have enough Regular Army engineers to man all the minefields being installed so he decided to utilise the part-time soldiers of the Volunteer Force. After successful trials the system was rolled out to ports around the country, where the Submarine Miners might be drawn from the Regular RE, the Militia, or the Volunteers. The Submarine Miners were also to the fore in developing searchlights to illuminate the minefields. By 1907 the War Office had decided to hand responsibility for the minefields to the Militia, but several Volunteer units were converted to Electrical Engineer Companies employing their lights for coastal artillery control and, eventually, anti-aircraft defences.

== Operation ==
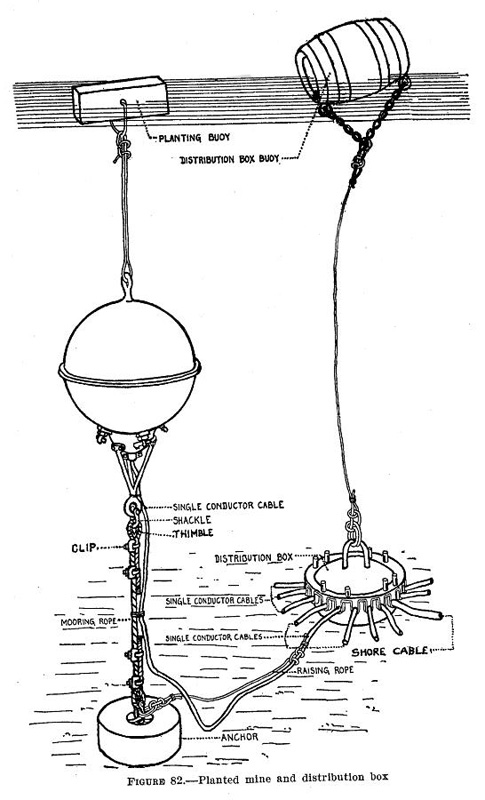
A controlled mine (at left), with the distribution box that connected it and the other mines in its group to the mine casemate on shore.

Unlike naval mines that are dispersed at sea, the controlled mine field location is chosen so that it could be under observation. The exact location of the mines was required so that they could be fired from the mine casemate when a target vessel was plotted by observers to be within the mine's effective range. For this reason the mines were "planted" in predetermined locations with electrical connection through cables to the firing location. The complex of mines, cables and junction boxes required maintenance. Specialized vessels to undertake the hazards of planting mines and maintaining the electrical cables were used.

In the United States a type of vessel termed mine planter was developed, built and deployed in 1904. By 1909 more mine planters were under construction and deployment had reached the San Francisco fortifications. These were assisted by smaller vessels. In the last stages of such coastal defenses during the Second World War the U.S. Army Mine Planter Service (USAMPS) mine flotilla usually consisted of two planters, four Distribution Box Boats and a small fleet of yawls and launches.

In the Royal Navy controlled mines were often laid alongside anti-submarine indicator loops during both World Wars; the US Navy used a similar strategy in at least World War II. A dozen specialized vessels known as "Indicator Loop Mine Layers"—including three Linnet-class minelayers and nine smaller vessels—much like the U.S. mine planters, were built for the Royal Navy immediately before and during WWII. Similarly in Japan four Hashima-class cable layers were built between 1939 and 1941 for mine planting duties.

== See also ==
- Naval mine
- Submarine mines in United States harbor defense

== Bibliography ==
- Ian F.W. Beckett, Riflemen Form: A study of the Rifle Volunteer Movement 1859–1908, Aldershot: Ogilby Trusts, 1982, ISBN 0 85936 271 X.
- Berhow, Mark A., ed. (2015). American Seacoast Defenses, A Reference Guide (Third ed.). CDSG Press. ISBN 978-0-9748167-3-9.
- Bogart, Charles H. (2008). Controlled Mines: A History of Their Use by the United States. Merriam Press. ISBN 978-1-4357-5835-3.
- Maj O.M. Short, Maj H. Sherlock, Capt L.E.C.M. Perowne and Lt M.A. Fraser, The History of the Tyne Electrical Engineers, Royal Engineers, 1884–1933, 1933/Uckfield: Naval & Military, nd, ISBN 1-845747-96-8.
- R.A. Westlake, Royal Engineers (Volunteers) 1859–1908, Wembley: R.A. Westlake, 1983, ISBN 0-9508530-0-3.
