= List of drill halls in Merseyside =

This is a list of former drill halls, TA Centres, and current Army Reserve Centres, within the county of Merseyside.

== Former drill halls ==
=== 19th Century ===
Name and location	Photograph	In use	Units	Notes
Mill Street Barracks; 53.45634°N 2.74083°W		1861–1980	47th Lancashire Rifle Volunteer Corps (1861–1880) A, B, C, D, E, F, G, H, and I Companies, 21st Lancashire Rifle Volunteer Corps (1880–1886) 2nd Volunteer Battalion, Prince of Wales's Volunteers (South Lancashire Regiment) (1886–1908) A, C, D, E, and G Companies, 5th Battalion, Prince of Wales's Volunteers (South Lancashire Regiment) (1908–1940) 596th (South Lancashire Regiment) Light Anti-Aircraft Regiment, RA (1947–1955) Q Battery, 436th (South Lancashire Artillery) Light Anti-Aircraft Regiment, RA (1955–1961) RHQ and P Battery, 436th (South Lancashire Artillery) Light Anti-Aircraft Regiment, RA (1955–1967) C (South Lancashire Artillery) Troop, 208 (3rd West Lancashire) LAD Battery, 103rd (Lancashire Artillery Volunteers) Light Air Defence Regiment, RA (1967–1969) RHQ and P (South Lancashire Artillery) Battery, The South Lancashire Territorials (Prince of Wales's Volunteers), RA (1967–1969) 213 (South Lancashire Artillery) Battery, 103rd (Lancashire Artillery Volunteers) Air Defence Regiment, RA (1969–1980)	213 (South Lancashire Artillery) Battery moved to more modern facilities in Jubilee Barracks in 1980, and therefore the building became empty. The Sea Cadet Corps took possession of the building and converted it into training ship Scimitar, shortly after, and it is still used as such today.
Princess Park Barracks (1863–1964) Crawford House TA Centre (1964–1987); 53.392423°N 2.962046°W		1863–1987	5th Lancashire (The Liverpool Rifle Volunteer Brigade) Rifle Volunteer Corps (1863–1888) 2nd Volunteer Battalion, King's (Liverpool Regiment) (1888–1908) 6th (Rifle) Battalion, King's (Liverpool Regiment) (1908–1936) 350 and 353 Companies, 38th (The King's Regiment) Anti-Aircraft Battalion, RE (1936–1940) 533rd Light Anti-Aircraft/Searchlight Regiment, RA (1947–1950) 368 (4th West Lancs) Medium Regiment, RA (1947–1956) 533rd Heavy Anti-Aircraft Regiment (The Liverpool Welsh), RA (1950–1955) Unknown units (1956–1969) 208th (Liverpool) General Hospital, RAMC (1969–1987)	The original Princess Park Barracks were rebuilt as Crawford House in 1964, when the West Lancashire Territorial and Auxiliary Forces Association moved in. This, however was only in use until 1987, when the hospital moved Chavasse House in Childwall. The former TA Centre was then sold, before being demolished and a new community centre, also named Crawford House was built on the site.
Windsor Barracks; 53.40061°N 2.95263°W		1881–1924	2nd Lancashire Artillery Volunteer Corps (1881–1902) 2nd Lancashire RGA (Volunteers) (1902–1908) 1st West Lancashire Brigade, RFA (1908–1921) 87th (1st West Lancashire) Brigade (1921–1924)	The barracks were subsequently demolished with the regeneration of the area.
Everton Road drill hall 53.41599°N 2.96566°W		1884 (only no. 59, other houses from 57 to 61 were taken over sometime before 1891) –1967	19th Lancashire Rifle Volunteer Corps (1884–1888) A, B, C, D, E, and G Companies, 6th Volunteer Battalion King's Liverpool Regiment (1888–1908) A, B, C, D, E, and G Companies, 9th Battalion, King's Liverpool Regiment (1908–1921) RHQ and 254th (West Lancashire) Field Company, 55th (West Lancashire) Divisional Engineers, RE (1922–1939) RHQ, and HQ and 177 Heavy Batterys, Lancashire and Cheshire Heavy Brigade, RA (c1935–1939) No. 2611 (West Lancashire) Squadron, RAuxAF (1947–1957) North West District (Mixed) Signal Regiment, Royal Signals (1958–1959) RHQ and No. 1 Squadron, 59th Signal Regiment, Royal Signals (1959–1967)	The Red Triangle Karate Club took over the old drill hall in the 1973. However, as of 2020, the main administrative buildings still stand disused, and in a poor state of repair, with a plan to transform it into affordable homes for Liverpool veterans.
Admiral Street drill hall 53.38753°N 2.96155°W		1885– bef-1924	6th Lancashire Artillery Volunteer Corps (1885–1889)	The drill hall was originally housed in a former skating rink, before acquiring a purpose built premises in the early 20th century.
73-77 Shaw Street; 53.414772°N 2.969471°W		1888–1967	Headquarters, 4th Volunteer Battalion, King's (Liverpool Regiment) (1888–1908) Headquarters, 7th Battalion, King's (Liverpool Regiment) (1908–1913) 1st (West Lancashire) Field Ambulance (?–1910) Headquarters, 1st Western General Hospital (?) Headquarters, Liverpool Infantry Brigade (?) 8th (Irish) Battalion, King's (Liverpool Regiment) (1913–1922) 106th (Lancashire Yeomanry) Brigade, RFA (1922–1938) 106th (Lancashire Yeomanry) Regiment, RHA (1938–1939) RHQ and 33rd Brigade Company, 4th Anti-Aircraft Division RASC (1938–1939) 8th (Western) General Hospital, RAMC (1947–1949) 626th (Liverpool Irish) Heavy Anti-Aircraft Regiment, RA (1947–1955)	The building was originally three separate houses, that were used from 1888 as a variety of unit HQs. However, after the whole Liverpool Irish battalion moved to the premises, a drill hall was constructed to the rear of the property.
Grange Road West drill hall 53.38924°N 3.04122°W		c1890–1967	RHQ, and ? Companies, 1st Volunteer Battalion, Cheshire Regiment (1900–1908) RHQ, and A, B, C, and D Companies, 4th Battalion, Cheshire Regiment (1908–1921) 4th/5th (Earl of Chester's) Battalion, Cheshire Regiment (1921–1939) RHQ and B Company, 4th Battalion, Cheshire Regiment (1947–1967)	After the 4th Battalion, amalgamated with the 7th Battalion in 1967, the drill hall became empty, and so it was sold to Birkenhead County Borough Council, who converted it into a sports and leisure centre. Today, the building is home to a local gymnastics club.

=== Early 20th Century ===
Name and location	Photograph	In use	Units	Notes
The Grange; 53.2433°N 2.5909°W		1900–1999	4th Lancashire Royal Garrison Artillery (Volunteers) (1900–1908) 4th West Lancashire Brigade, RFA (1908–1921) 59th (4th West Lancashire) Medium Brigade (1921–1940) 359th (4th West Lancashire) Medium Regiment (1947–1967) RHQ and Q (4th West Lancashire) Battery, West Lancashire Regiment, RA (1967–1969) 59 (West Lancashire) Signal Squadron, 33rd (Lancashire and Cheshire) Signal Regiment, Royal Signals (1967–1993) 13 (Lancashire) Company, 4th Battalion, Parachute Regiment (1993–1999)	In 2003, the TA Centre went up for sale, and was bought to be used as the Museum of the Liverpool Scottish. It served this purpose, until the museum vacated the premises in 2008, and it now hosts a number of business, including a dance studios and a vintage furniture shop.
7 Fraser Street; 53.409988°N 2.976253°W		1904–1967	8th (Scottish) Volunteer Battalion, King's (Liverpool Regiment) (1904–1908) 10th (Scottish) Battalion, King's (Liverpool Regiment) (1908–1920) 10th (Liverpool Scottish) Battalion, King's (Liverpool) Regiment (1920–1937) The Liverpool Scottish, Queen's Own Cameron Highlanders (1937–1939) 1st Battalion, The Liverpool Scottish, Queen's Own Cameron Highlanders (1939–1967) 655th (Liverpool Scottish) Light Anti-Aircraft/Searchlight Regiment, RA (1947–1950)	Due to the 1967 reduction of the Territorial Army, the battalion was reduced in size, and formed two separate units: V (Liverpool Scottish) Company, 51st Highland Volunteers, and G (Liverpool Scottish) Troop, R (King's) Battery, West Lancashire Regiment, RA. Both of these units moved out of Fraser street into Forbes House, Childwall. This led to the building on Fraser Street being sold, and converted into a nightclub.
Southport drill hall 53.650930°N 2.997708°W		1908–?	RHQ and Divisional Company, West Lancashire Divisional Transport and Supply Column, ASC (1908–1914) 55th (West Lancashire) Divisional RASC (1920–1939) RHQ 22nd (Southport) Transport Column, RASC (1947–1965) 581 Company, RASC / 581 Squadron, RCT (1947–1957, 1962–1967) 538 Company, RASC (1947–1960) 22nd (Southport) Regiment, RCT (1965–1967) Troop, 238 (Sefton) Squadron, 156th Transport Regiment, RCT (1981−?)	Drill hall was demolished in 2004, and replaced with flats.
Tramway Road drill hall 53.375689°N 2.947466°W		1908–1967	Liverpool Brigade and North Lancashire Brigade Companies, West Lancashire Divisional Transport and Supply Column, ASC (1908–1914) Lancashire Fortress Engineers, RE (1908–1939) 1st West Lancashire Field Ambulance, RAMC (1910–1914) RHQ, and 353 (12th West Lancashire) and 356 (27th West Lancashire) Batteries, 89th (3rd West Lancashire) Brigade, RA (192?–1937) 509th Field Company, RE (1929–1940) RHQ, and 211 (13th West Lancashire), 212 (27th West Lancashire), and 225 (12th West Lancashire) Anti Aircraft Batteries, 70th (3rd West Lancashire) Anti-Aircraft Brigade, RA (1937–1939) 25th Light Anti-Aircraft Regiment, RA (1939) RHQ, 59th (Staffordshire) Divisional Engineers, RE (1939–1940) 300 Airborne Field Squadron, 131st Airborne Engineer Regiment, RE (1947–1948) 128th Field Engineer Regiment, RE (1947–1949) 130th Construction Regiment, RE (1947–1949) RHQ and 910 Company, 4th Anti-Aircraft Group Column, RASC (1947–1950) 912 Company, RASC / 912 Squadron, RCT (1947–1967) 107th Field Engineer Regiment, RE (1947–1967) 1 Troop, 300 Airborne Field Squadron, 131st Airborne Engineer Regiment (1948–1954) Troop, 299 Airborne Field Squadron, 131st Airborne Engineer Regiment (1954–1967)	Drill hall is now demolished.
Liscard drill hall 53.422763°N 3.042037°W		c1911– ?	F, and G Companies, 4th Battalion, Cheshire Regiment (c1911–1921?)	After the building was vacated, it was in use for many years as a motor body shop, however it has recently been demolished.
Crosby drill hall 53.491119°N 3.026530°W		1910–1962	E Company, 7th Battalion, King's Liverpool Regiment (1910–1920) 66th Anti-Tank Regiment, RA (1939) 390th (King's Own) Light Anti-Aircraft Regiment, RA (1947–1950) R (King's Own) Battery, 306th (Lancashire Hussars) Heavy Anti-Aircraft Regiment, RA (1950–1956) 581 Company, 22nd (Southport) Transport Column, RASC (1957–1962)	Became surplus to requirement after 581 Company RASC moved back to Southport, and so it was converted into a youth centre.
Mossley Hill drill hall 53.380620°N 2.912590°W		1914–1967	Quartermaster Store (1914–1918) 136th (1st West Lancashire) Field Regiment, RA (1939–1947) 336th (1st West Lancashire) Medium Regiment, RA (1947–1950) RHQ 4th Anti-Aircraft Group Column, RASC (1950–1955) RHQ 124th Transport Column, RASC (1955–1957) 910 Company, RASC / 910 Squadron, RCT (1950–1967)	The building was constructed in the 1800s as a Hackney Cab depot for Liverpool. The business folded shortly before WW1 and so the army utilised it as a Quartermaster Store; after the war, it was leased as an automobile garage, however sometime before WW2 this business vacated the premises, and the army once again took control of the building, using it as a TA Centre until the mid 60s. Today, the building functions as a warehouse for a printing company, the building having been heavily modified, and a portion demolished.
Wellington Barracks (1914–1956) Chavasse TA Centre (1956–1967); 53.395540°N 2.929530°W		1914–1967	87th (1st West Lancashire) Field Ambulance, RAMC (1914–1924) 87th (1st West Lancashire) Field Regiment, RA (1924–1947) 287th (1st West Lancashire) Field Regiment, RA (1947–1956) 165th (Western) Casualty Clearing Station, RAMC (1954–1967)	Once 165th CSS amalgamated to form 208th Field Hospital, the TA Centre became surplus to requirement, and so was used for a number of purposes, including being used as a General Post Office, until 1996, when Frontline Church took over the building, using it for a worship and teaching area.
Signal House (1937–1967) Forbes House (1967–1999); 53.404506°N 2.899194°W		1937–1999	RHQ, and No. 1 and 3 Companies, 55th (West Lancashire) Divisional Signals, Royal Signals (1937–1947) 22nd Corps Signal Regiment, Royal Signals (1947–1953) 343 Signal Squadron, Royal Signals (1947–1967) No. 3 Squadron, 42nd (Lancashire) Divisional Signal Regiment, Royal Signals (1949–1967) G (Liverpool Scottish) Troop, R (The King's) Battery, West Lancashire Regiment, RA (1967–1969) V (Liverpool Scottish) Company, 1st Battalion, 51st Highland Volunteers (1967–1992) V (Liverpool Scottish) Company, 5th/8th Battalion, King's Regiment (1992–1999)	The building was demolished after being vacated in 1999, and replaced by a block of flats also known as Forbes House.
Crossacres; 53.368552°N 2.865023°W		1939–	HQ 33rd (Western) Anti-Aircraft Brigade (1939–1947) HQ 59th Anti-Aircraft Brigade (1947–1955) HQ 79th Anti-Aircraft Brigade (1947–1955) 14th Anti-Aircraft Group Signals, Royal Signals (1947–1955) Western Command (Mixed) Signal Regiment, Royal Signals (1955–1956) North West District (Mixed) Signal Regiment, Royal Signals (1956–1958)	
48, Ullet Road; 53.388037°N 2.944439°W		1949–1969	8th (Liverpool) General Hospital, RAMC (1949–1967) 208th (Liverpool) General Hospital, RAMC (1967–1969)	The units were accommodated in a converted large house, which has subsequently been turned into flats.

=== Late 20th Century ===
Name and location	Photograph	In use	Units	Notes
Deysbrook Barracks; 53.435015°N 2.888105°W		1956–2002	42 Command Workshop, REME (1956–1993) 11th Signal Group / 11th Signal Brigade (1967–1996) RHQ and HQ (King's) Battery, 103rd (Lancashire Artillery Volunteers) Regiment, RA (1969–1992) 59 (West Lancashire) Signal Squadron, 33rd (Lancashire and Cheshire) Signal Regiment, Royal Signals (1993–1999)	The barracks were built in 1955 on the site of Deysbrook House which was purchased by the War Office during the Second World War. The barracks were sold and demolished in 2003, with a housing estate and Tesco Superstore being built on the site.
Aintree Barracks; 53.458705°N 2.949854°W		c1985–2009	55 (West Lancashire) Signal Squadron, Royal Signals (1984–1999) 59 (City of Liverpool) Signal Squadron, 33rd (Lancashire and Cheshire) Signal Regiment, Royal Signals (1999–2009)	When 33rd (Lancashire and Cheshire) Signal Regiment, was reduced to a squadron in 2009, the TA Centre was turned into a Royal Air Force Careers Office for North Liverpool.

== Current Army Reserve Centres ==
Name and location	Photograph	In use	Units	Notes
Townsend Avenue Army Reserve Centre; 53.443416°N 2.931194°W		1937–	5th Battalion, King's Regiment (Liverpool) (1937–1967) R (The King's) Battery, West Lancashire Regiment, RA (1967–1969) B Company (King's), Lancastrian Volunteers (1967–1971) SHQ and Troop, 55 (Thames and Mersey) / 55 (West Lancashire) Signal Squadron, Royal Signals (1967–1972) North West Infantry Band (c1970s–2006) B Company (King's), 1st Battalion Lancastrian Volunteers; and B Company, 2nd Battalion, Lancastrian Volunteers (1971–1975) D Company, 5th/8th Battalion, King's Regiment (1975–1984) B Company, 5th/8th Battalion, King's Regiment (1975–1992) A (King's Liverpool) Company, 5th/8th (Volunteer) Battalion, King's Regiment (1984–1999) A (King's) Company, King's and Cheshire Regiment (1999–2006) A (Ladysmith) Company, 4th Battalion, Duke of Lancaster's Regiment (2006– ) Band of the Duke of Lancaster's Regiment (2006– )	
Mather Avenue Army Reserve Centre; 53.443416°N 2.931194°W		1936–	RHQ, and 351 and 352 Companies, 38th (The King's Regiment) Anti-Aircraft Battalion, Royal Engineers (1936–1940) 573rd (Mixed) Heavy Anti-Aircraft Regiment (The King's Regiment), RA (1947–1955) 287th (1st West Lancashire) Regiment, RA (1956–1967) P (1st West Lancashire) Battery, West Lancashire Regiment, RA (1967–1969) RHQ and 235 (West Lancashire) Squadron, 156th (Lancashire and Cheshire) Regiment, Royal Corps of Transport (1967–1980) RHQ, and 235 (Liverpool) Squadron, 156th (Merseyside and Greater Manchester) Transport Regiment, Royal Corps of Transport (1980–1993) 235 (Liverpool) HQ Squadron, 156 Regiment, RLC (1993– ) 125 Field Company, 101 Battalion, REME (2014– )	
Brigadier Philip Toosey Barracks; 53.376750°N 2.944917°W		c1939–	470th (3rd West Lancashire) Regiment, RA (1947–1967) 525th Light Anti-Aircraft Regiment, RA (1947–1955) RHQ and HQ Battery, 103rd (Lancashire Artillery Volunteers) Air Defence Regiment, RA (1967–1969) 208 (3rd West Lancashire) Battery, 103rd (Lancashire Artillery Volunteers) Regiment, RA (1967– )	
Chavasse House, Childwall; 53.397607°N 2.864828°W		1985–	Headquarters, 208th (Liverpool) Field Hospital (1985–2023) A Squadron, 208th (Liverpool) Field Hospital (1985–1999 ?-2023) Liverpool Squadron, 206th (North West) Multi-Role Medical Regiment, RAMS (2023– )	
Alamein Barracks, Huyton; 53.420572°N 2.845010°W		1956–	Headquarters Squadron, 40th/41st Royal Tank Regiment (1956–1967) RHQ and No. 1 Squadron, 59th Signal Regiment (1967) 1 Troop, 107 (Lancashire and Cheshire) Field Squadron, 75 Engineer Regiment, RE (?–1992) RHQ and Headquarters Squadron, 33rd (Lancashire and Cheshire) Signal Regiment, Royal Signals (1967–1999) 55 (Merseyside) HQ Squadron, 33rd (Lancashire and Cheshire) Signal Regiment, Royal Signals (1999–2009) 33 (Lancashire) Signal Squadron, 37th Signal Regiment, Royal Signals (2009– )	
Harrowby Road Army Reserve Centre; 53.380712°N 3.030681°W		c1905–	1st Cheshire Engineer Volunteers (1905–1908) Cheshire Field Company, Welsh Divisional Royal Engineers (1908–1915) 438 (Cheshire) Field Company, Welsh Divisional Royal Engineers (1915–1920) 2nd Cavalry Divisional Engineers, RE (1920–1938) 2nd Cavalry Divisional RASC (1920–1938) 2nd (Cheshire) Field Squadron, Mobile Divisional Engineers, RE (1938–1939) Mobile Divisional RASC (1938–1939) 102nd (Cheshire) Transport Column, RASC (1947–1952) 113th Engineer Regiment, RE (1947–1961) 113 (Cheshire) Independent Field Squadron, RE (1961–1967) HQ 107 (Lancashire and Cheshire) Field Squadron, 75 Engineer Regiment, RE (1967– )	
Chetwynd Army Reserve Centre, Oxton; 53.383165°N 3.057547°W		1939–	RHQ and 288 Anti-Aircraft Battery, 93rd Heavy Anti-Aircraft Regiment, RA (1939–1943) 543 Company, 102nd Armoured Transport Regiment, RASC (1947–c1949) 493rd (Mixed) Heavy Anti-Aircraft Regiment, RA (1947–1955) 543 and 585 Companies, 102nd (Cheshire) Transport Column, RASC (c1949–1965) Q (Wirral) Battery, 441st Light Anti-Aircraft/Searchlight Regiment, RA (1955–1961) R (Wirral) Battery, 287th (1st West Lancashire) Field Regiment, RA (1961–1967) 543 and 585 Squadrons, 102nd (Cheshire) Regiment, RCT (1965–1967) 234 (Cheshire) Squadron, 156th (Lancashire and Cheshire) Regiment, RCT (1967–1980) 234 (Wirral) Squadron, 156th (Merseyside and Greater Manchester) Transport Regiment, RCT (1980–1993) 234 (Wirral) Supply Squadron, 156 Regiment, RLC (1993– )	
RG Masters VC Army Reserve Centre, Bootle; 53.473713°N 2.975968°W		2009–	238 (Sefton) Squadron, 156 Regiment, RLC (2009– )	
Jubilee Barracks, St Helens; 53.450329°N 2.748718°W		1980–	213 (South Lancashire Artillery) Battery, 103rd (Lancashire Artillery Volunteers) Air Defence Regiment, RA (1980–1992) 2 Troop, 107 (Lancashire and Cheshire) Field Squadron, 75 Engineer Regiment, RE (1980–2006) 213 (South Lancashire Artillery) HQ Battery, 103rd (Lancashire Artillery Volunteers) Air Defence Regiment, RA (1992–2001) Regimental Headquarters, 103rd (Lancashire Artillery Volunteers) Regiment, RA (1992– ) G Troop, 209 (The Manchester & St Helens Artillery) Battery, 103rd (Lancashire Artillery Volunteers) Regiment, RA (2001–2015) 9 Platoon, C Company, 4th Battalion, Parachute Regiment (2006–2018) Headquarters Troop, 103rd (Lancashire Artillery Volunteers) Regiment, RA (2015– ) Lancashire Artillery Pipes & Drums Band, 103rd (Lancashire Artillery Volunteers) Regiment, RA (1992– )	
