= Broughty Ferry Volunteer Hall =

Hall in Dundee, Scotland, 1870s–2023

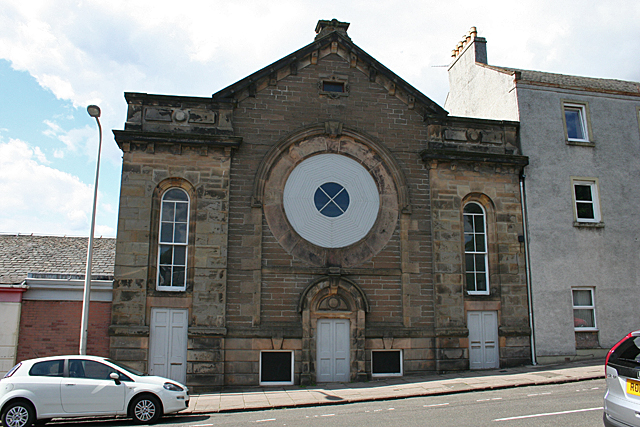
- The hall before demolition
- Interactive map of the Broughty Ferry Volunteer Hall area

General information
- Type: Drill hall Cinema; Bingo hall
- Location: 51 Queen Street; Broughty Ferry
- Coordinates: 56°28′09″N 2°52′45″W
- Opened: 1870s
- Renovated: 1936, 1979, 1990s
- Closed: 1991
- Demolished: 2023
- Owner: Arbroath Cinema Company (c. 1930-1968); J. B. Milne Theatres Ltd. (1968-1976); Kingsway Entertainments (1976-1991)

Technical details
- Material: Sandstone

Design and construction
- Architecture firm: Maclaren, Soutar, and Salmond (1936)

Other information
- Seating capacity: 712

Listed Building – Category B
- Official name: 51 Queen Street, Drill Hall
- Designated: 9 October 1990
- Delisted: 1 April 2022
- Reference no.: LB25866

Listed Building – Category C(S)
- Official name: 51 Queen Street, Drill Hall
- Designated: 1 April 2022
- Delisted: 26 January 2026
- Reference no.: LB25866

Broughty Ferry Volunteer Hall, later the Regal Cinema, was a drill hall in Broughty Ferry. In 1936 it was converted into a cinema, for which it was used for a further 40 years before being employed as a bingo hall.

After the hall closed to bingo in 1991, it was used as a car showroom. In the time since, its structure fell into a state of disrepair, culminating with the building being demolished in 2023 after it was deemed unsafe. Only a small section of the original facade of the building survives.

Listed building status was officially removed on 26 January 2026.
