= 42nd (East Lancashire) Signal Regiment =

East Lancashire Divisional Telegraph Company 42nd (East Lancashire) Divisional Signals 42 (Lancashire) Signal Regiment 42 (City of Manchester) Signal Squadron 842 Signal Troop
- Badge of the Royal Corps of Signals
- Active: 1908–present
- Country: United Kingdom
- Branch: Territorial Army
- Role: Signals
- Part of: 42nd (East Lancashire) Division; 66th (2nd East Lancashire) Division; 59th (Staffordshire) Infantry Division; 33 (Lancashire and Cheshire) Signal Regiment
- Garrison/HQ: Manchester
- Motto: 'Go One Better'
- Engagements: First World War: Egypt; Gallipoli; German spring offensive; Hundred Days Offensive; [[World War II]|Second World War]]: Battle of France; North West Europe

42 (East Lancashire) Signal Regiment was a Territorial Army unit of the British Army's Royal Corps of Signals. It had its origins in a Volunteer unit of the Royal Engineers formed in Manchester during the Second Boer War. It provided the divisional signals during both world wars, and served with the 42nd (East Lancashire) Division, the 66th (2nd East Lancashire) Division, and the 66th Infantry Division. Its successor continues in the Army Reserve as a Signal Troop in Manchester.

== Origin ==
The unit has its origins in G Company, 3rd Lancashire Royal Engineers, a Volunteer Force unit of the Royal Engineers (RE) formed in the City of Manchester during the Second Boer War. When the Volunteers were subsumed into the Territorial Force (TF) in 1908, G Company of this unit became the basis for the East Lancashire Divisional Telegraph Company (termed Signal Company from 1911). The company headquarters (HQ) was at the East Lancashire RE drill hall at 73 Seymour Grove, Old Trafford; the rest of the company was organised as a cable section and three brigade signal sections:

- No 1 (Cable) Section at Seymour Grove
- No 2 (Lancashire Fusiliers) Section
- No 3 (East Lancashire) Section
- No 4 (Manchester) Section

Nos 2–4 Sections were attached to and largely manned by the three infantry brigades of the division; nine motor cycle Despatch riders had been added to the company by 1914. The first Officer Commanding (OC) was Captain E.C. Holden. The Signal Company did not train with the rest of the division in 1912, having been specially selected to take part in that year's Autumn Manoeuvres of the Regular Army.

== First World War ==
=== Mobilisation ===
At the beginning of August 1914, the East Lancashire Division was preparing to go on annual training at Caernarfon when orders came cancelling the camp because of the deteriorating international situation. The RE companies returned to Seymour Grove, where mobilisation orders arrived at 18.00 on 4 August. The men were billeted in the schools next door to the drill hall and horses and carts were requisitioned according to standing instructions. On 10 August TF units were invited to volunteer for Overseas Service, which was greeted with acclamation at Seymour Grove; virtually the whole of the East Lancashire Division volunteered. On 18 August, the signal company went to Bury and its sections camped with their brigades.

On 31 August, the formation of a reserve or 2nd Line unit was authorised for each 1st Line unit where 60 per cent or more of the men had volunteered for Overseas Service. The titles of these 2nd Line units would be the same as the original, but distinguished by a '2/' prefix. In this way, duplicate battalions, brigades and divisions were created, mirroring those TF formations being sent overseas. Later, 3rd Line units were formed to supply drafts to the 1st and 2nd Lines.

=== 42nd (East Lancashire) Divisional Signal Company ===
42nd (East Lancashire) Divisional insignia, First World War

The East Lancashire Division was selected as the first complete TF division to go overseas, to relieve Regular troops from garrison duties in Egypt. The divisional engineers entrained at Bolton on 9 September and the following day embarked at Southampton with the signal company (150 strong) aboard the Saturnia. The OC of the Signal Co on embarkation was Captain (later Major) Arthur Lawford.

==== Egypt ====
The convoy of troopships arrived at Alexandria on 25 September, and the divisional RE moved to Cairo, where the Signal Co set up communications for the Cairo defences and trained infantry signallers. Two cable detachments ran a line from Kantara to Ismailia, which was very important when the Suez Canal defences were attacked the following year. Early in 1915, the signal establishment was increased to provide a section for the divisional artillery HQ, another cable detachment and additional motor cycle despatch riders, bringing the company strength up to 208. All the other ranks (ORs) in Nos 2–4 Sections were transferred from their infantry regiments to the RE. The divisional RE was withdrawn for training after Christmas, but returned to the canal defences when the Turkish Army carried out a Raid on the Suez Canal. Signal detachments were engaged in the fighting at Tussum on 3–4 February 1915.

==== Gallipoli ====
On 1 May, the division began embarking at Alexandria to join the Gallipoli Campaign, the Signal Co with Divisional HQ (DHQ) aboard the Crispin. 2nd Signal Section landed with the Lancashire Fusilier Brigade at Cape Helles on 5–6 May and went straight into action at the Second Battle of Krithia; the rest of the company landed 9–10 May. The division was designated 42nd (East Lancashire) Division (callsign YDB) from 26 May, with the infantry brigades designated 125th (Lancashire Fusiliers) Brigade (ZLE), 126th (East Lancashire) Brigade (ZLF) and 127th (Manchester) Brigade (ZLG).

Company HQ was established above Lancashire Landing, but then moved to join DHQ, running telegraph cables back to corps HQ and forward to the brigade HQs, then to the flanking divisions (29th and Royal Naval). The company had to provide a large party to reinforce 29th Divisional Signal Co, which had suffered heavy casualties. On 25 May, a rainstorm flooded 125th Bde HQ in Krithia Nullah, washing away the signals equipment, and the section suffered casualties while replacing it. On 3 June, Sergeant C.E. Williams won the first Distinguished Conduct Medal (DCM) awarded to the company when in charge of two cable-laying parties in Krithia Nullah. They were caught by two salvoes of Turkish artillery fire, suffering casualties to men, horses and equipment, but he reorganised them and completed the job in time for the next day's attack (the Third Battle of Krithia). The company then had several days' intense work during the battle with the infantry brigades requiring communication to be maintained from their advanced HQs in the support trenches to their main HQs and to their supporting artillery. The company also established a visual signal link back to DHQ, which proved of great value when signal cables were continually cut by artillery fire. In the subsequent fighting of 12–13 July, the division's cable lines were utilised when those of the attacking divisions were cut.

By the end of August, the company strength was very low because of sickness, and it was commanded by a junior officer. Captain R.W. Dammers of the Sherwood Foresters assumed command on 10 October. In December, the decision was made to wind up the campaign. 42nd (EL) Division was relieved from 28 December, the signal sections leaving with their brigades for Mudros. Company HQ and No 1 Section reached Mudros on 3 January 1916, leaving only a small detachment to work the communications until the final evacuation from Helles on 9 January.

==== Sinai ====
42nd (EL) Division was withdrawn from Mudros to Egypt on 16 January and returned to Cairo. The company moved up to Shallufa on the canal by 2 February, where a large draft arrived from England to refill the ranks. The company worked on setting up cable and visual communications between desert strongpoints and the HQs. On 3 April, the company moved to Suez for training. Captain Dammers having been invalided, Capt C.H. Williamson of No 4 (Manchester Bde) Section took over as OC. The company returned to the canal defences in June, maintaining an elaborate communication network. When 42nd (EL) Division advanced after the Battle of Romani (3–5 August), the company struggled to get a horsed cable wagon up to the divisional report centre; after that camel transport was improvised in the pursuit to Katia Oasis. From then until the end of January 1917, 42nd (EL) Division protected the railhead as it slowly advanced across the Sinai Peninsula to El Arish, with the signallers erecting telegraph lines along the route.

On 28 January 1917, after reaching El Arish, 42nd (EL) Division was ordered to leave Egypt and join the British Expeditionary Force on the Western Front. It entrained for Kantara and marched to Moascar, where it concentrated, and then moved to Alexandria for embarkation at the end of the month. The company's strength at this time was 5 officers and 229 ORs.

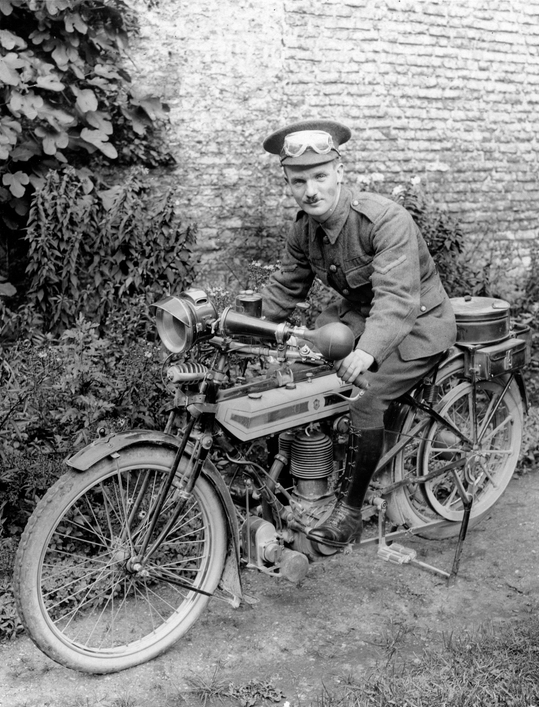
British motorcycle despatch rider on the Western Front.

==== Western Front ====
The signal sections sailed with their respective brigades, and the division concentrated at Pont-Remy on 15 March. At the time the BEF was engaged in following the German retreat to the Hindenburg Line (Operation Alberich) requiring much cable-laying in the devastated area around Péronne. The first medal awarded to the division in France was a Meritorious Service Medal (MSM) to Corporal Samuel Eccles, a despatch rider who rode 15 miles (24 km) to deliver a message despite a broken ankle sustained in an accident en route. In May, the division moved to Havrincourt Wood in front of the Hindenburg Line, where the Signal Co laid deep buried cables to the brigade HQs. It also carried out its first work with trench wireless. The company was reorganised, with a sub-section allocated to each of the division's Royal Field Artillery brigades.

In July, the division was withdrawn for training at Achiet-le-Petit, where the signallers were instructed in all the new communication methods that had been introduced while they were in Egypt. Then, in August, the division was sent to the Ypres Salient, with the Advanced Signal Office and Report Centre established in the ramparts of Ypres itself. Constant shellfire meant frequent and dangerous work to repair cable breaks. On 6 September, 125th Bde made an attack on the strongpoints of Iberian, Borry and Beck House farms (the division's only involvement in the Battle of Passchendaele), and for 24 hours the only communications No 2 Section were able to maintain were by carrier pigeon. After only three weeks in the Salient, the division was relieved, but casualties among the signallers at the Advanced Signal Office in the ramparts during this period amounted to 90 per cent, mainly from poison gas.

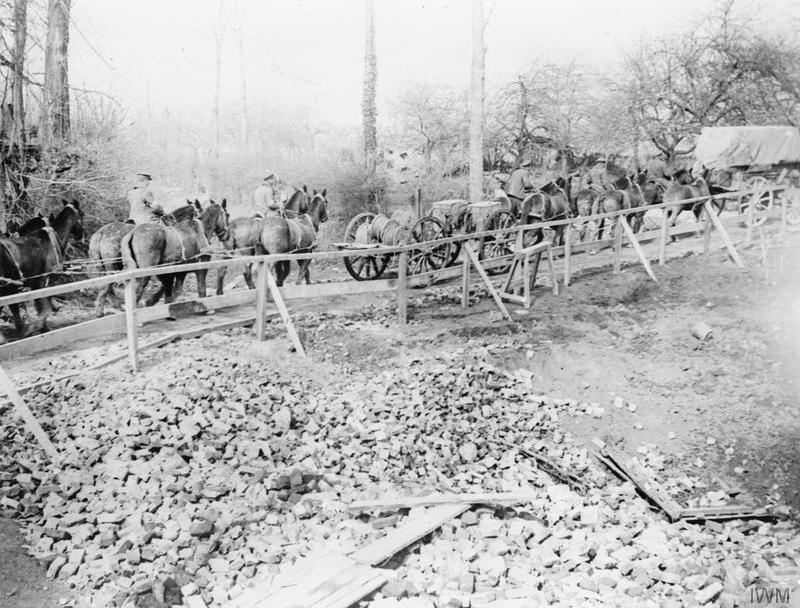
RE cable wagons advancing on the Western Front.

42nd (EL) Division next went to Nieuport on the Belgian coast, where the flooded country and persistent shelling meant heavy work for the signallers to repair telephone lines that were frequently broken, particularly across the River Yser. On 19 November, the division moved again to the La Bassée sector, where the signallers were engaged in burying signal cables to avoid shell damage. Although the sector was quieter, 125th Bde HQ was hit by a salvo of shells and the signal office wiped out. The division was withdrawn for rest and training on 15 February 1918. By 1 March, the company's strength was 9 officers and 274 ORs.

At a lecture to the division's officers and NCOs on 1 March 1918, the commander of 42nd (EL) Division, Maj-Gen Arthur Solly-Flood, coined the motto 'Go one better', which continued to be used by the signal company and its successors.

==== Spring Offensive ====
When the German spring offensive opened on 21 March, 42nd (EL) Division was in GHQ Reserve, and was ordered forward on the night of 22/23 March. It rushed up without transport and took up positions near Bapaume the following night, with DHQ and Report Centre established at Gomiécourt. The signal company was unable to function properly without its transport and equipment, and had to rely on its motorcycle despatch riders. Much signal cable that was laid was wasted by the frequent movements of HQs, and casualties were heavy among signallers repairing shelled cable, while the wireless station at Gomiécourt was knocked out by a series of direct hits. The brigade signal sections suffered many casualties in the heavy fighting. On the afternoon of 25 March, DHQ moved to Foncquevillers, where the signallers picked up a buried cable route and re-established communications with corps HQ. The advanced Divisional Signal Office found itself in No man's land for 12 hours, but got all its stores away using motor transport. DHQ moved back again on 26 March, entailing more signal cable being run, with pairs of signallers stationed every half mile to check and repair the lines.

The division was out of the line for rest and reorganisation from 7 to 16 April, after which it returned to Foncquevillers, where the signallers re-located and brought back into use cables that had been buried during the Battle of the Somme two years earlier. Visual, wireless, carrier pigeon, messenger dog and rocket signals were all used. The division was out of the line again from 6 May to 7 June, when tactical training was carried out, and the operators and linemen trained the signallers of the 307th US Infantry Regiment, which was attached to 42nd (EL) Division for training. The division returned to the front on 8 June. Now that the line had stabilised a complete system of Front, Support ('Red') and Reserve ('Purple') positions was prepared, with a switch line between the Red and Purple systems, connected by buried signal cables.

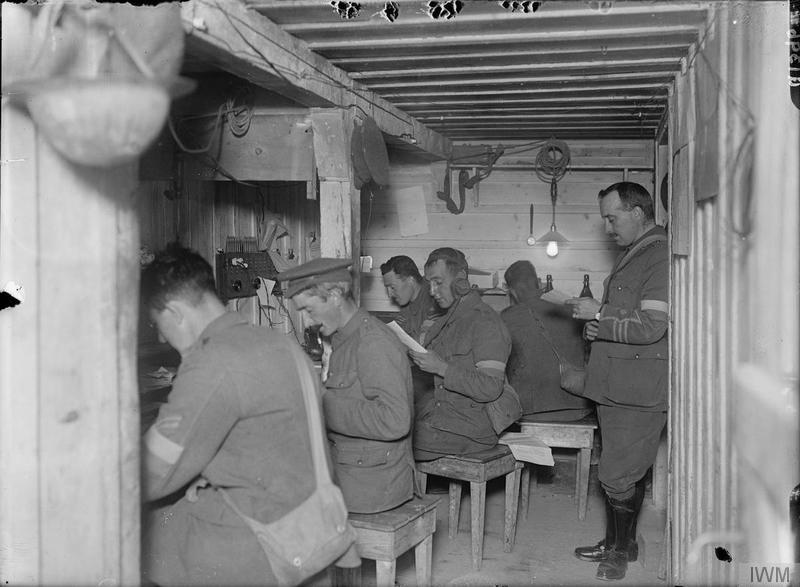
RE Signal Company at work on the Western Front.

==== Hundred Days ====
After the victory of the Battle of Amiens on 8 July – the start of the Allied Hundred Days Offensive – the Germans in front of 42nd (EL) Division began to withdraw. The division reorganised for open warfare, forming self-contained brigade groups, which required communications to be established quickly with cable barrows, wireless and improvised methods, particularly when supplies of cable ran short. The division was then relieved for rest on 5 September and the signallers scoured the old battlefields to salvage usable cable.

During the night of 21/22 September, 42nd (EL) Division went back into the line, east of Havrincourt Wood, to prepare for an assault on the Hindenburg Line. The signal company put back into use the cable it had buried a year earlier. In two continuous days of fighting (the Battle of the Canal du Nord, 27–28 September), the East Lancashires leap-frogged through five successive objectives. They went back into the line on 9 October, at Briastre on the River Selle, along which the retreating Germans had made a stand. The division attacked on 20 October (the Battle of the Selle), securing all its objectives and consolidating against counter-attacks. The signal company suffered serious casualties during the advance; inexperienced men were employed to operate the cable-laying carts, while more experienced men dealt with maintenance.

The Signal Company struggled with over 50 per cent casualties from the Spanish flu outbreak and from combat: 126th Bde suffered heavy casualties during the division's advance through the Forêt de Mormal, so No 3 Signal Section abandoned its duties and manned the front line as infantry. The fighting was ended by the Armistice with Germany on 11 November, by which time DHQ had reached Hautmont. During the Hundred Days campaign, the signal company had kept up communications during an advance of over 100 miles (160 km).

After the Armistice, 42nd (EL) Division. concentrated in the Charleroi area until February 1919, but thereafter demobilisation began in earnest. The last cadre of the signal company returned to the UK in March. During the war, 47 officers and men of the company had been killed, died of wounds or disease.

=== 66th (2nd East Lancashire) Divisional Signal Company ===
66th (2nd East Lancashire) Divisional insignia

When the 42nd (EL) Division left Bolton for Egypt in September 1914, it left behind a number of officers and men who were unfit or were not liable for overseas service. In October, they moved to Winstanley Park, Wigan, and the engineers began to receive the first new recruits from Seymour Road. On 14 November, the 2nd Line Divisional RE began to form at Southport including 2/1st East Lancashire Signal Company. Although the companies were soon up to full strength, there was little equipment to train on – the signallers were restricted to flag signals – and only a few old .256-in Japanese Ariska rifles with which to mount guards.

Training was also interrupted by the need to send reinforcement drafts to the 42nd (EL) Division at Gallipoli (one exceptionally large one going to the signal company in March 1915), and it was not until August 1915 that the 2nd East Lancashire Division was concentrated at Crowborough in East Sussex, and received its designation as 66th (2nd East Lancashire) Division, which was also taken by the signal company. In March 1916, the division moved from the hutted camp at Crowborough to Colchester Garrison where the RE were accommodated in the Cavalry Barracks. It was not until February 1917 that embarkation orders were received. DHQ set off on 28 February and embarked at Southampton for Le Havre.

==== Western Front ====
66th (2nd EL) Division concentrated near Béthune and took over a sector of old line in considerable disrepair, which the divisional RE and signallers began to put into order. On 20 March, the division sidestepped to the Hohenzollern Redoubt sector, where it saw Trench warfare action. At the end of June, the division moved to the Flanders coast where it joined Fourth Army preparing to advance in support of the expected breakthrough at Ypres. This never happened, and the division moved up into the old French reserve line at Nieuport, requiring considerable improvement by the sappers and signallers.

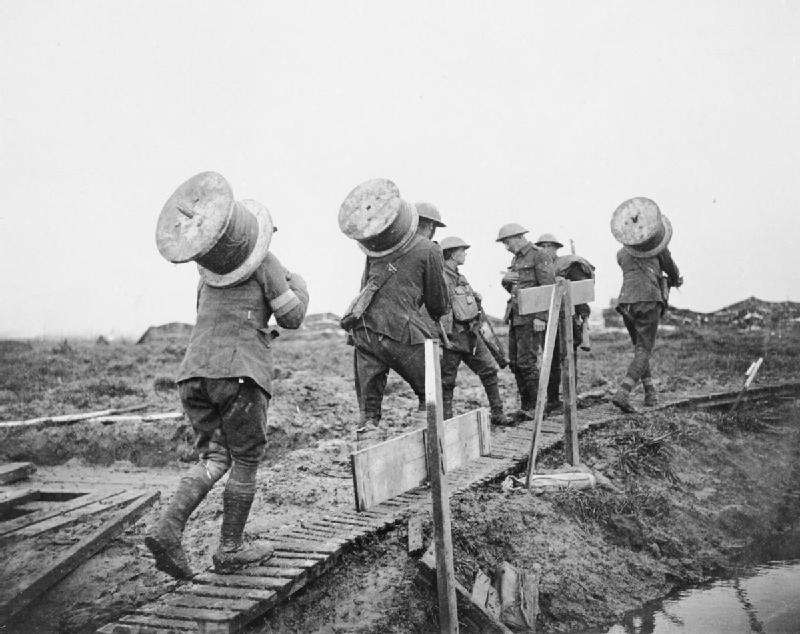
Royal Engineers bringing up telephone cable during the Battle of Poelcappelle.

66th (2nd EL) Division was relieved at Dunkirk by 42nd (EL) Division in September and was sent to the Ypres Salient. The infantry had a bad time in their first major battle at Poelcappelle on 9 October, but the RE were mostly engaged in roadmaking and communications. After the Ypres offensive came to a halt in late 1917, the divisional sappers were put to work building defences from the Menin Road to the Zonnebeke Road and then on the Broodseinde Ridge, with all the associated communications.

==== Spring Offensive ====
In February 1918, 66th (2nd EL) Division moved from Ypres to the Villers-Bretonneux sector. The defences were thin and in poor condition; the divisional RE were put to work on new defences to meet the expected German Spring Offensive, with the signallers digging long lines of new cable trench. When the attack came on 21 March, the forward RE sections fought with the outpost line until they were driven back. That night and next day they prepared the 'Green Line' behind the crumbling front before the German attack was renewed on 22 March, at the end of which 66th (2nd EL) division withdrew through the 50th (Northumbrian) Division, which manned the Green Line. The line was turned elsewhere, and for the next few days of retreat the division took part in a series of stands until it reached Hangard Wood on 30 March, where it was relieved by French troops and went for rest in Amiens.

After their great losses, the infantry units of 66th (2nd EL) Division were reduced to cadres on 9 April and were used to train American troops. DHQ and the brigade HQs remained in existence, with a constantly-changing roster of subordinate units.

==== Hundred Days ====
66th Division was reformed on 18 September 1918, mainly with non-Lancashire units and moved into the line on 7 October. It attacked before dawn next day (the Second Battle of Cambrai), taking all its objectives by the end of the day, and continued the attack the next day against light opposition. From 10 to 12 October it pursued the enemy to the River Selle. The Battle of the Selle began on the night of 17/18 October, with the 66th Division bridging the river and then following up through Le Cateau.

On 9 November, part of 66th Division joined 'Bethell's Force' under the divisional commander, Maj-Gen Hugh Bethell, to continue the pursuit. This mobile force included all the divisional pioneers and RE with the signal company, and kept up pressure on the retreating Germans until the Armistice came into force two days later.

66th Divisional RE remained in France on reconstruction work until demobilisation began in January 1919. This was completed on 13 June, and the division was disbanded. The unit had lost 22 officers and men killed or died of wounds or disease during the war.

=== Third Line Depot ===
By mid-1915, the decision was made not to supply drafts to the 1st Line 42nd (EL) Division from the 2nd Line 66th (EL) Division, but to form 3rd Line training units for the purpose. The 3rd Line Depot, East Lancs RE, was formed at Old Trafford in August 1915. In September, it moved to Southport, with three field companies and a signal company under command. At the beginning of 1916, the depot moved to the Western Command Reserve Training Centre, RE, at Caernarfon, joining the 3rd Line RE of the 55th (WL) and 53rd (Welsh) Divisions. Later, the signal companies were sent to their own Signal Service Training Centre, which was split over several sites.

=== Provisional Signals ===
Once the 3rd Line had been established, the unfit men and those remaining TF men who had only signed up for Home Service were separated to join brigades of coast defence units (termed Provisional units from June 1915). 9th Provisional Brigade was formed in East Kent from Lancashire units and details from local Home counties units. By September 1915, it included the 9th Provisional Signals Section, RE. After the Military Service Act 1916 swept away the Home/Foreign service distinction, all TF soldiers became liable for overseas service, if medically fit. The provisional brigades' role thus expanded to include physical conditioning to render men fit for drafting overseas. Late in 1916 the War Office decided to form them into new home service divisions; in November 1916, 9th Provisional Bde moved from Margate to Blackpool in Lancashire to form the basis of the new 73rd Division and the signal section expanded to form 73rd Divisional Signal Company.

After assembling in Lancashire, 73rd Division moved in early January 1917 to join Southern Army (Home Forces), stationed in Essex and Hertfordshire, with the Signal Company at Hitchin. In December that year, the War Office decided to break up the division, and this was carried out on 4 March 1918 when the signal company was disbanded.

== Royal Signals ==
When the TF was reconstituted as the Territorial Army (TA) in 1920–1, 42nd (East Lancashire) Divisional Signals was reformed, but transferred from the RE to the newly formed Royal Corps of Signals (RCS). From June 1922, it was headquartered at the Burlington Street drill hall in Manchester, vacated when the 7th Bn Manchester Rgt was amalgamated after the war. The unit consisted of HQ and three companies, organised as follows:

- No 1 Company
  - A Section – wireless links between DHQ, Divisional Signal Centre and infantry brigade HQs
  - B Section – cable links between DHQ, Divisional Signal Centre, artillery and infantry brigade HQs
- No 2 Company
  - D Section – signal office for Commander, Royal Artillery
  - E, F and G Sections – cable links between artillery brigade HQs and their batteries
- No 3 Company
  - H Section – signal office for DHQ and Divisional Signal Centre
  - J, K and L Sections – cable links between infantry brigade HQs and their battalions

No 3 (East Lancashire) Company, 2nd Corps Signals, a Supplementary Reserve (SR) unit to provide technical support to the Regular Army, was also formed at Burlington Street in 1924 and administered by 42nd (EL) Divisional Signals. By the late 1920s, 42nd (East Lancashire) Divisional Area also included 222nd Field Artillery Signal Section at Blackburn, and 211th Medium Artillery Signal Section at Stockport Armoury. No 1 (East Lancashire) Corps Medium Artillery Signal Section (SR), No 1 (East Lancashire) Air Stores Park Signal Section (SR) and No 9 (East Lancashire) Air Squadron Signal Section (SR) were established by 1930 and administered by 42nd (EL) Divisional Signals.

42nd (EL) Divisional Signals and the units it administered moved to Norton Street, Brooks' Bar, Stretford, Manchester, on 12 March 1932. The unit was completely mechanised by 1935. Just before the outbreak of the Second World War, 273 Army Tank Battalion Signal Section (TA) and 251 Light Anti-Aircraft Regiment Signal Section (TA) were being formed at Brooks Bar and also administered by 42nd (EL) Divisional Signals.

== Second World War ==
=== Mobilisation ===
Following the Munich Crisis, the TA was doubled in size. Once again, 42nd (EL) Division formed 66th Division as its duplicate: this became active with its own signals (66th (Lancashire and Border) Divisional Signals) on 28 September 1939.

=== 42nd (East Lancashire) Infantry Divisional Signals ===
After mobilisation, 42nd (EL) Division moved to Hungerford for training, and then embarked for France on 12 April 1940 to join the British Expeditionary Force (BEF).

==== Dunkirk ====
42nd (East Lancashire) Divisional Signals landed at Cherbourg Naval Base and moved up to the Lille area. When the German offensive in the west opened on 10 May, the BEF advanced into Belgium in accordance with 'Plan D', with 42nd (EL) Division moving up to the Escaut, where it was in reserve. However, the German Army broke through the Ardennes to the east, forcing the BEF to withdraw again, and by 19 May the whole force was back across the Escaut. The Germans established bridgeheads across the Escaut at dawn on 20 May, but it was the deep penetration further east that forced the BEF to withdraw. Next day, 42nd (EL) Division covering Tournai was under attack and, by 23 May, it was back on the next canal line.

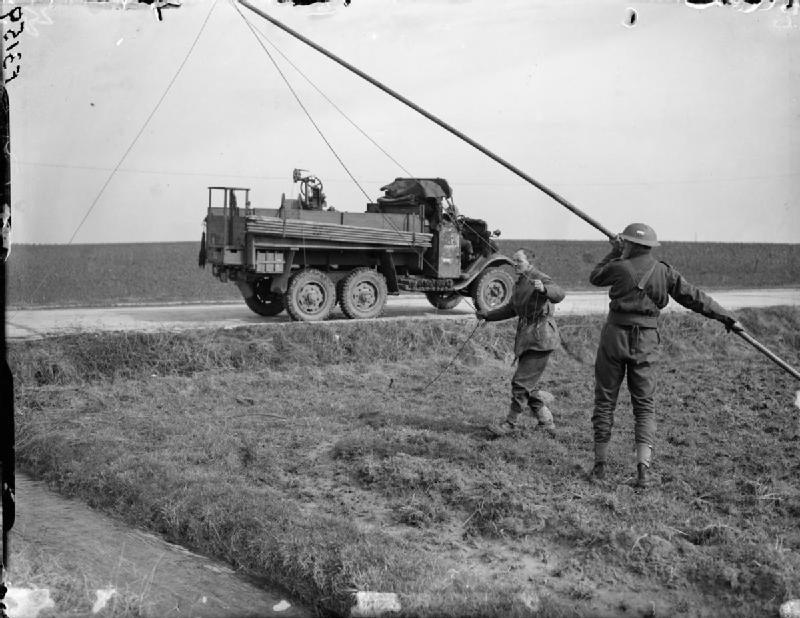
Royal Signals erecting cable poles in France, 1940.

By 26 May, the BEF was cut off and the decision was made to evacuate it through Dunkirk (Operation Dynamo). On 27 May 42nd (EL) Division was ordered to withdraw from the canal line to the River Lys, and the following day to the River Yser, defending the south side of the Dunkirk 'pocket'. The division completed its evacuation on 31 May. During the withdrawal, 42nd (EL) Divisional Signals had lost three men killed, seven wounded, and one missing.

==== Home Defence ====
On return to England, the unit reformed at Darlington in Northern Command, moving shortly afterwards to the Barnard Castle area, with DHQ at Raby Castle. By September 1940, it had re-equipped sufficiently to take its place in IV Corps of the mobile home defence forces. By November, it was in XI Corps in Eastern England, with the signals at Wethersfield, Essex.

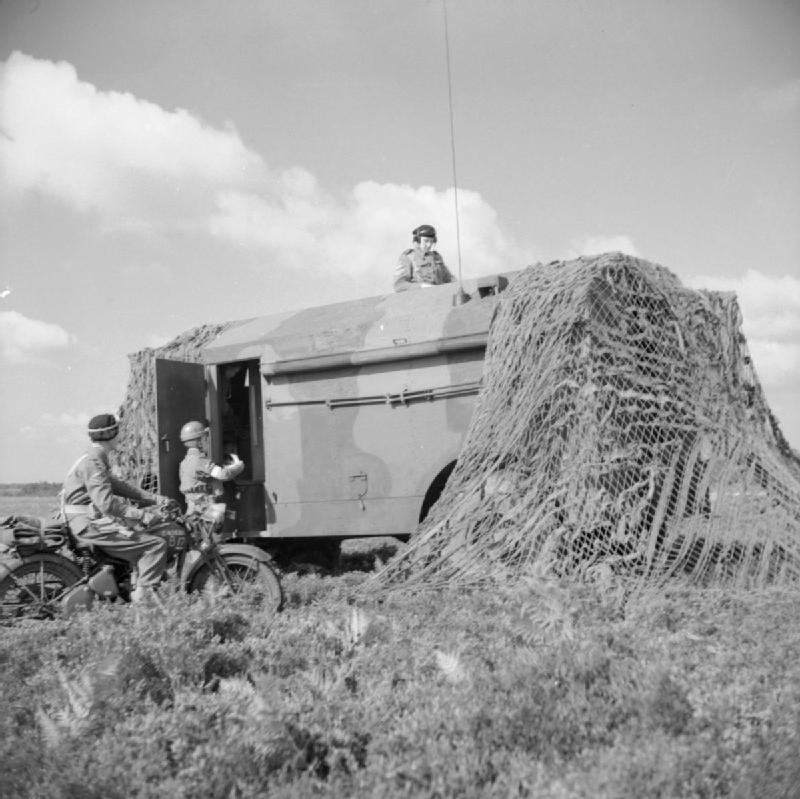
Royal Signals despatch riders and AEC armoured command vehicle on exercise in England, 1941.

=== 42nd (East Lancashire) Armoured Divisional Signals ===
On 31 October 1941, 42nd (EL) Infantry Division was converted into 42nd Armoured Division. Although 42nd Division dropped the 'East Lancashire' subtitle when it became an armoured formation, the signals unit retained the subtitle. The division returned to Barnard Castle to re-train in its new role. However, it never went overseas, and in October 1943 the division was disbanded and its units dispersed. The personnel of 42nd Armoured Divisional Signals were drafted to other units, though the unit continued to exist in name only.

=== 66th (Lancashire and Border) Divisional Signals ===
The new 66th Division also had a short life: it was disbanded on 22 June 1940 and its units dispersed. The divisional signals unit, however, was kept together and transferred to 59th (Staffordshire) Infantry Division, which, despite its title, had been formed as the second line duplicate of 55th (West Lancashire) Division. 59th Division's original Lancashire-raised signal unit had been sent to the Middle East, where it eventually became Eighth Army Signals.

=== 59th (Staffordshire) Divisional Signals ===
59th (Staffordshire) Division trained in Northern Command with X Corps and IX Corps, in Wales with III Corps, and had a spell in Northern Ireland from June 1942 to March 1943. On return to England, it trained with XII Corps for Operation Overlord, the Allied invasion of Normandy. By this stage of the war, divisional signals comprised about 28 officers and 700 ORs, with one company providing communications for DHQ, a second supplying sections to the divisional artillery units, and the third to the infantry brigade HQs, the reconnaissance regiment, the machine gun battalion and the divisional engineers.

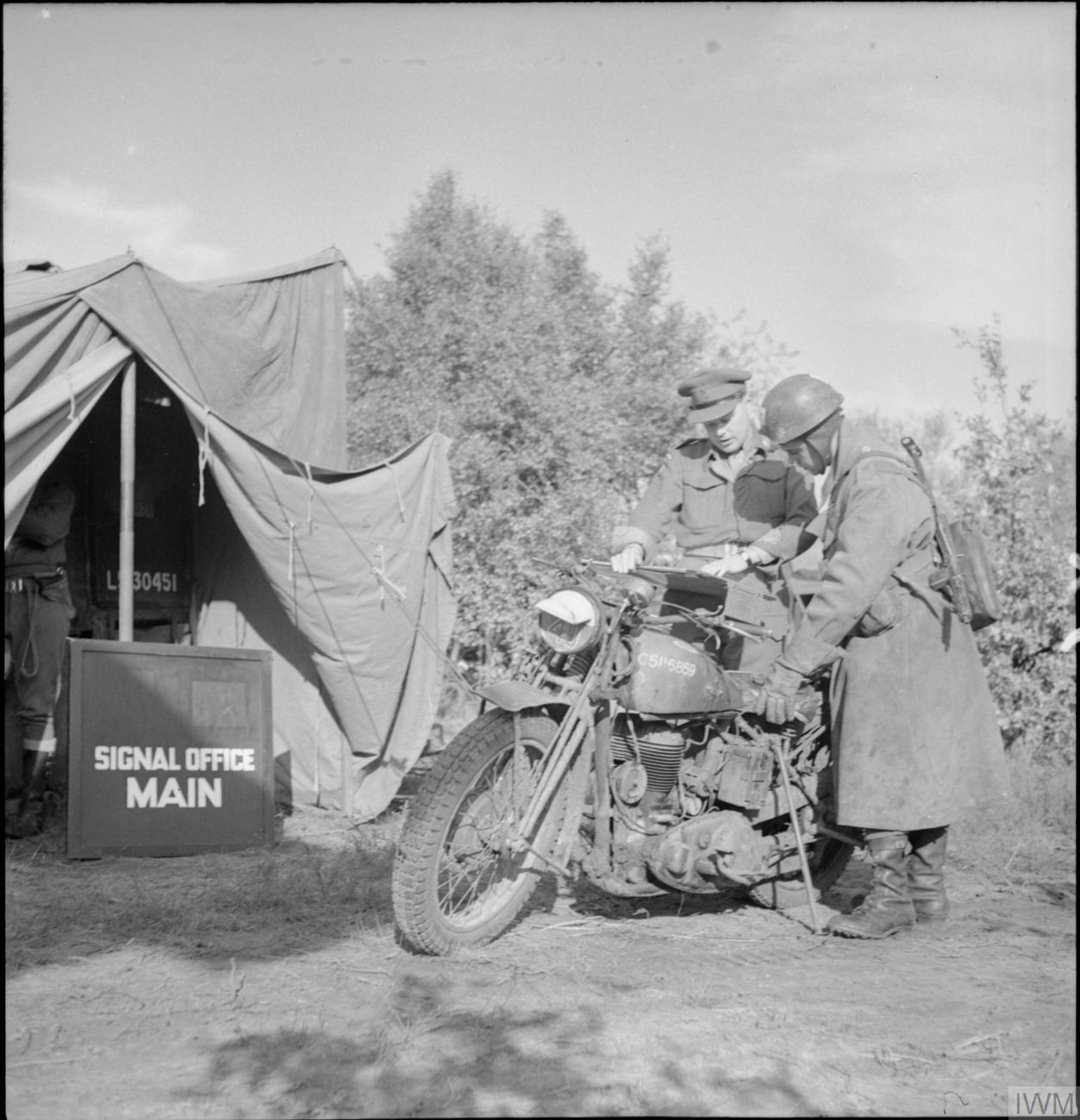
A Royal Signals despatch rider being briefed, 1944.

==== Normandy ====
59th (S) Division was a follow-up formation for Overlord, landing in Normandy around 27 June 1944. It was sent into the Battle for Caen, participating in Operation Charnwood from 7 July. Next it shifted to XXX Corps for the Second Battle of the Odon, designed to distract German attention from the forthcoming Operation Goodwood. 59th (S) Division came into the line, attacking Haut des Forges, Noyers-Bocage and Landelles-et-Coupigny. The fighting was bitter and gains were small: 59th (S) Division took Haut des Forges, but attacked Noyers again and again without success.

59th (S) Division was next heavily engaged in the fighting for Mont Pinçon (Operation Bluecoat). On 6 August, the division's infantry waded across the River Orne near Brieux, and then held its bridgehead against serious counter-attacks. As the breakout from the Normandy beachhead accelerated, 59th (S) Division was squeezed out of the line.

By now, 21st Army Group was facing a manpower shortage, and 59th (S) Division, as the junior formation, was broken up to reinforce other divisions from 31 August. 59th (Staffordshire) Divisional Signals was disbanded in October 1944.

== Postwar ==
When the TA was reconstituted in 1947, the prewar 42nd (East Lancashire) and 55th (West Lancashire) Division were reformed as a combined 42nd (Lancashire) Division. 42 (East Lancashire) Divisional Signal Regiment began reforming on 1 May 1947 with the following organisation:

- Regimental HQ and No 1 Squadron at Norton Street, Brooks Bar, Manchester
- No 2 Squadron at the Drill Hall, Dinting Lane, Glossop, Derbyshire – formed May 1948
- No 3 Squadron at Signal House, Cross Lane, Liverpool – formed 1949

In 1950, 3 Sqn absorbed the Liverpool TA elements of 22 (West Lancashire) Corps Signal Regiment (the former 59th (Motor) Divisional Signals that had been replaced by 66th Divisional Signals in 1940). The same year the signal regiment dropped the 'East' from its Lancashire subtitle. For many years, 3 Sqn was the only 'Mixed' part of the regiment to include members of the Women's Royal Army Corps (WRAC). In June 1956, RHQ and 1 Sqn moved to Norman Road, Rusholme, in Manchester, formerly occupied by 606th (East Lancashire) Heavy Anti-Aircraft Regiment, Royal Artillery. The Cadet Corps unit at Rusholme was transferred from 606th HAA Rgt to 42 Signal Rgt. The old Norton Street drill hall was then handed over to the Royal Army Medical Corps (TA)

On 1 April 1961, the regiment was reorganised, with 2 Sqn in Derbyshire transferring to 64 Signal Rgt and a squadron joining from 59th (Mixed) Signal Rgt. The regiment also took on administrative responsibility for three brigade signal sqns:

- RHQ at Rusholme
- 1 Sqn at Cross Lane Drill Hall, Salford, Greater Manchester – from 59 Signal Rgt
- 2 Sqn at Rusholme (with a detachment at Britannia Road, Sale, Greater Manchester until 1966) – former 1 Sqn
- 3 Sqn at Score Lane, Liverpool
- 304 Sqn at Blacon Point House, Blacon, Chester – 23 Independent Armoured Bde
- 309 Sqn at Aspinall Street, Prescot, Merseyside – 127 (East Lancashire) Infantry Bde
- 343 Sqn at Score Lane, Liverpool – 158 (Royal Welch Fusiliers) Infantry Bde
- Light Aid Detachment, Royal Electrical and Mechanical Engineers at Rusholme

From 1961, the mixed squadrons including members of the WRAC (1 and 3 Sqns) trained for a wartime role giving signals support to the Civil Defence organisation at Cuerden Hall, Bamber Bridge, Preston, the designated wartime Regional Seat of Government. 2 Squadron remained all-male at the time, but 1 and 2 Squadrons exchanged roles in the 1960s.

In 1965, the regiment was redesignated 42 (Lancashire and Cheshire) Signal Rgt, but when the TA was reduced into the Territorial and Army Volunteer Reserve (TAVR) in 1967 it became a single squadron (42 (East Lancashire) Sqn) at Rusholme in 33 (Lancashire and Cheshire) Signal Regiment. On 16 February 1999, the squadron received the title 42 (City of Manchester) Signal Sqn.

33 (L&C) Signal Rgt was disbanded after the 2009 strategic review of reserves and was reduced to a single 33 Lancashire Signal Sqn, first in 32 Signal Regiment, then from 2014 in 37 Signal Regiment under the Army 2020 reorganisation. It continues to maintain 842 Signal Troop at Rusholme, Manchester.

== Insignia ==
42nd (East Lancashire) Division's formation badge on the Western Front during the First World War consisted of a diamond divided horizontally, white over red. During the Second World War, it was a red diamond with a white centre. From 1947 to 1967, it was the old red diamond outline bearing a Red Rose of Lancaster on the white centre. After 1967, 42 (City of Manchester) Signal Sqn adopted this badge as its squadron flash.

Members of the WRAC attached to the regiment post-1947 wore the WRAC cap badge, with the Mercury cap badge of the Royal Signals ('Jimmy') worn above the left pocket of the battledress blouse, and the 42nd Division arm badge. From 1992, the WRAC was disbanded and women now wear the Royal Signals badge.

== Commanding Officers ==
Unit commanders included the following:

East Lancashire Divisional Signal Co, RE:

- Capt E.C. Holden, 1908–12
- Maj Arthur Niven Lawford, 1912–15
- 2/Lt A.Roberts, acting July–October 1915
- Capt R.W. Dammers, Sherwood Foresters, 10 October 1915
- Capt C.H. Williamson, Manchester Regiment, May 1916
- Maj S.Gordon Johnson, DSO, MC, South Staffordshire Regiment, November 1916–September 1918
- Maj P.A. Foy, MC, September 1918–February 1919
- Maj J. Parkinson, 7 February–March 1919

66th (2nd East Lancashire) Divisional Signal Co, RE:

- Maj J.S. Parsons, DSO
- Maj E.N. Eveleigh, DSO
- Maj A.L. McIntosh, MC

42nd (East Lancashire) Divisional Signals:

- Maj A.C. Roberts, MC, 1920–24
- Lieutenant-Colonel W. Monks, 1924–26
- Lt-Col R.S. Newton, MC, 1926–32
- Lt-Col R. Lazenby, 1932–33
- Colonel W.S. Ashley, OBE, TD, 1932–38 and 1939–41
- Lt-Col C.B. Delaney, 1938–39
- Lt-Col E.R. Sutton, MSM, TD, to 30 October 1939
- Col M.E. Holdsworth, TD, 19 March–1 July 1941
- Lt-Col C.G. Moore, 1 July–15 October 1941
- Lt-Col R.C. Conway-Gordon, 15 October 1941 – 1943

66th (Lancashire and Border) Divisional Signals:

- Lt-Col K.F. Woodham, TD, 1939

59th (Staffordshire) Divisional Signals:

- Lt-Col W.A. Scott, MBE, 1940
- Lt-Col R.C.Steel, OBE, MC, TD, 1941–44

42nd (Lancashire) Divisional Signals:

- Lt-Col S.A. Woods, TD, 1947–52
- Lt-Col C.H.H. Lingard, 1952–May 1955
- Maj G.S. Camp, acting May–5 August 1955
- Lt-Col D.N. Deakin, 5 August 1955 – 27 September 1958
- Lt-Col I.W. Herbert, TD, 28 September 1958–September 1963
- Lt-Col R. Boyd, September 1963–26 September 1965
- Lt-Col P.D. Weymont, TD, 26 September 1965 – 31 March 1967

== Honorary Colonel ==
The following served as Honorary Colonel of the unit:

- Sir Frederick Joseph West, GBE (1872–1959), a distinguished engineer who was Lord Mayor of Manchester in 1924–25, was appointed Hon Col of the unit on 30 April 1927.
- Col W.S. Ashley, OBE, TD, former CO, 1947–52
- Col S.A. Woods, TD, former CO, 1952–57
- Col A.R.B. Dobson, OBE, TD, industrialist and former squadron commander, 10 October 1957 – 1962
- Col C.H.H. Lingard, TD, former CO, 1962–67.

== Memorial ==
A memorial plaque with the 41 names of the 42nd (EL) Signal Company who died on service during the First World War was unveiled at the Brooks Bar drill hall on 21 October 1934. It was moved to the Norman Road TA Centre in 1955 and is now in the foyer.

== See also ==
- Biography of Company Sergeant-Major Roland Harry Nuttall of 42nd (EL) Divisional Signals, 1907–15, at the Ubique website.

== External sources ==
- Maj I.G. Kelly, 42 Signal Squadron History (archive site).
- Great War Forum
- The Long, Long Trail
- Land Forces of Britain, the Empire and Commonwealth – Regiments.org (archive site)
- Ubique site dedicated to the RE
