= Lancashire Fortress Royal Engineers =

- Active: 1884–1967
- Country: United Kingdom
- Branch: Territorial Army
- Role: Coast Defence; Field Engineering
- Garrison/HQ: Aigburth
- Engagements: World War I: Gallipoli; Palestine; Hundred Days Offensive; World War II: Greek Campaign

The Lancashire (Fortress) Royal Engineers was a volunteer unit of Britain's Royal Engineers formed in 1884 to defend the Mersey Estuary. As well as serving in this role, it also provided specialist engineer units in both World Wars, losing many men in a shipping disaster during the Greek Campaign. Its descendants continued to serve in the Territorial Army until 1967.

== Origin ==
When Lt-Gen Sir Andrew Clarke, Inspector-General of Fortifications 1882–6, did not have enough Regular Royal Engineers (RE) to man the fixed mines being installed to defend British seaports, he utilised the Volunteer Engineers for this task. After successful trials the system was rolled out to ports around the country. In October 1884 the 1st Lancashire Engineer Volunteer Corps at Edge Hill, Liverpool formed K Company to cover the Mersey Estuary. In 1888 the submarine miners were constituted into a separate branch of the RE Volunteers, and K Company became the Mersey Division Submarine Miners with the first officers' commissions dated 17 March 1888.

Based in Liverpool, it ranked 8th in the list of volunteer submarine mining divisions, moving up to 7th in 1891 when the Humber division was converted into Militia. By 1899 it consisted of three companies.

In 1907 the War Office decided to hand all submarine mining duties over to Militia units and the Volunteer submarine miners were converted into electrical engineers to continue manning the electric searchlights of the harbour defences. The Liverpool unit was briefly retitled the Mersey Division Electrical Engineers.

== Territorial Force ==
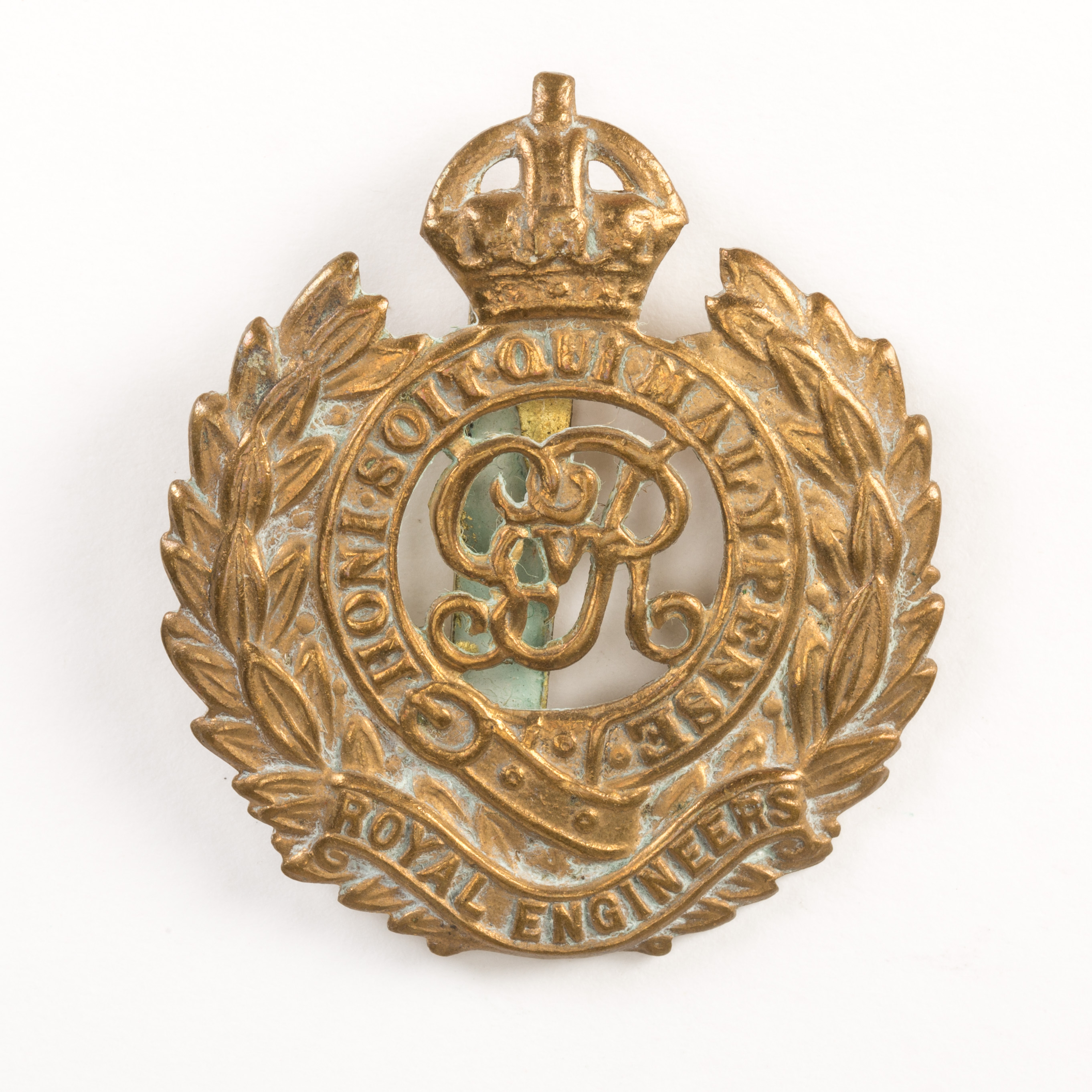
RE Cap badge (King George V cipher).

When the Volunteers were subsumed into the new Territorial Force (TF) under the Haldane Reforms in 1908, the former submarine miners were redesignated again, the Mersey Division becoming the Lancashire (Fortress) Royal Engineers, with Nos 1 and 2 Electric Lights Companies and No 3 Works Company at Tramway Road, Aigburth. The Tramway Road drill hall was shared with TF units of the West Lancashire Division's Royal Army Medical Corps and Army Service Corps.

== World War I ==
=== Mobilisation ===
On the outbreak of war in August 1914, the Lancashire Fortress Engineers mobilised and went to their war stations on 5 August. No 1 (EL) Company was employed on the Mersey defences, No 2 (EL) Company went to Ireland to assist on the defences of Lough Swilly and Queenstown, and No 3 (Works) Company went to Crosby where it worked alongside civilian labour and nearby training units to dig coastal earthworks and trenches to defend Liverpool. In the event, Britain's coast defences were hardly tested during the war, but the Lancashire Fortress Engineers provided units and personnel for other roles at home and overseas.

On the outbreak of war, units of the Territorial Force were invited to volunteer for Overseas Service. On 15 August 1914, the War Office issued instructions to separate those men who had signed up for Home Service only, and form these into reserve units. On 31 August, the formation of a reserve or 2nd Line unit was authorised for each 1st Line unit where 60 per cent or more of the men had volunteered for Overseas Service. The titles of these 2nd Line units would be the same as the original, but distinguished by a '2/' prefix. Later, many of these were mobilised for overseas service in their own right.

=== 1/3rd Lancashire Company ===
After completing the Liverpool defences in December 1914, 1/3rd (Works) Company was sent to Malta, where TF units were relieving the regular garrison for active service elsewhere. Then in 1915 the company was sent on again to join the Gallipoli Campaign. It served at Cape Helles until September, when it was withdrawn to the offshore base on the island of Imbros where it was engaged in erecting workshops and sinking ships for breakwaters.

After the Allied evacuation from Gallipoli the company went to Egypt, where it was designated the 3rd Lancashire Army Troops Company. It served with the Egyptian Expeditionary Force (EEF) as Line of Communication troops in April 1916, then as Corps troops on the Suez Canal defences. When the TF units of the RE were given numbers in February 1917, it became the 555th (Lancashire) Army Troops Company.

In February 1917, the company joined the Palestine Campaign attached to the Desert Mounted Column, then, from May 1917 until early 1919, it was working on the Lines of Communications. During the final advance of the EEF in 1918, the company was in the vicinity of Ludd (Lod), engaged in quarrying, road repair and bridging Wadis.

=== 2/3rd Lancashire Company ===
In November 1916, the 2/3rd Fortress Company was assigned to 71st Division, a newly formed Home Service division assembling in Hampshire and Surrey, which it joined in December. The company was numbered the 549th (Lancashire) Field Company in February 1917. The following month the division moved to the East Coast and concentrated at Colchester, where it formed part of Southern Army of Home Forces and was responsible for defending the Essex coast from Mersea Island to Walton-on-the-Naze.

Towards the end of 1917, the War Office decided to break up the Home Service divisions to provide reinforcements for other formations. This was carried out by February 1918 and in March the 549th Company was redesignated as an Army Troops Company. It embarked for France on 22 June to join the British Expeditionary Force (BEF) on the Western Front, disembarking at Le Havre. Primarily engaged in constructing dug-outs and protected machine-gun positions during the summer, it successively served under First and Fifth Army, with XVII Corps in September 1918 and finally Third Army by the time of the Armistice with Germany in November 1918.

The commanding officer complained in October about the constant moves, pointing out that the unit had little transport with which to move its equipment. That month, the company was in the Cambrai area carrying out repairs. Even the Armistice did not end the company's work: through the winter it was still engaged in repairs, and erecting hutting for demobilisation camps near Doullens and then at Antwerp, where its own demobilisation began during the spring of 1919.

=== Anti-Aircraft Companies ===
In addition to operating searchlights for the coastal defence guns, the electric light companies of the fortress engineers began to use them in the Anti-Aircraft (AA) role. As the war progressed and raids by airships and fixed wing bombers became more frequent, the RE formed specialist AA Searchlight Companies. By mid-1916 the Lancashire Fortress Engineers had provided the personnel for No 5 (Lancashire) AA Company, RE. As the AA defences of the UK expanded, this became Nos 49 and 51 AA Companies RE, based in Manchester and Liverpool respectively. In January 1918 the AA defences were reorganised and the RE searchlight personnel were attached directly to AA gun companies of the Royal Garrison Artillery. By May 1918 the Lancashire AA units formed part of Northern Air Defences (NAD). At this stage of the war the NAD was barely troubled by German raids, and most of the men of medical category A1 had been withdrawn from AA duties and sent to join the BEF.

== Interwar ==
When the TF was reconstituted as the Territorial Army in 1920, the Lancashire (Fortress) RE reformed as single Electric Light & Works company in 55th (West Lancashire) Divisional Area. By the end of the 1930s the company was sharing its Tramway Road HQ with the 70th (3rd West Lancashire) Anti-Aircraft Regiment, Royal Artillery.

== World War II ==
=== Mobilisation ===
In August 1939, prior to the outbreak of war, No 1 (EL & Works) Company, Lancashire Fortress RE, was mobilised at Tramway Road and detachments and went to their war stations at Fort Crosby, Hightown, and Fort Perch Rock, New Brighton, as part of Fixed Defences Mersey (FDM). Shortly after the declaration of war it also manned Fort Walney at Barrow-in-Furness. The detachments operated generators and searchlights and attended to wiring.

In May 1940, the unit (less small detachments left to man the lights) was withdrawn from the coastal defence forts and concentrated at Tramway Road to become 580th (Lancashire) Army Troops Company. It then moved to a series of billets and camps around the country.

At the beginning of January 1941, the company embarked at Glasgow, and sailed via Gibraltar, Freetown and Cape Town to Port Tewfik on the Suez Canal, where it disembarked on 4 March, with a strength of 4 officers and 264 other ranks.

=== Greece ===
In March 1941, Middle East Forces sent troops to assist the Greek Army against a probable German invasion. The bulk of the front-line forces were Australian, New Zealand and Polish troops, but they were supported by British armour and a number of RE works and transportation units including newly arrived 580th AT Company. The RE units were tasked with repairing and improving the rudimentary road and rail network of the Greek mainland on which the force depended, while simultaneously preparing demolitions to delay the enemy advance.

The German attack came on 5 April, before the British Commonwealth troops were fully in position, and the Allied forces were soon in retreat. On 19 April it was decided to begin evacuation from the port of Piraeus, which was already under air attack. The Commonwealth troops fought delaying actions in the passes, where 580 AT Co suffered some casualties. The Hellas, a large steam yacht, came into the harbour on 24 April and offered to take 1000 passengers. It was crammed with Maltese and Cypriot civilians, walking wounded from an Australian hospital, and the men of 580 AT Company and some New Zealand troops. The ship was instructed to sail after dark, but just before sunset it was dive-bombed by Stukas, caught fire and capsized, with the loss of 4–500 lives.

A large number of 580 AT Co's men became casualties, burned or drowned in the Hellas disaster, or taken prisoner of war (POW) – many of them badly injured – when they could not be evacuated. The unit's records were lost, and inquiries among survivors and returning POWs continued into 1945 in attempts to find out what had happened to the missing men. Some of the men who were evacuated went straight to Egypt, others went via Crete, where if they were lucky they were evacuated again before the Germans captured that island in turn.

Eight members of 580 AT Company are buried at the Commonwealth War Graves Commission (CWGC) Phaleron War Cemetery outside Athens and a further 38 names appear on the Athens Memorial at Phaleron commemorating those who died in the Greek campaign but have no known grave. Most of these died on 24 April 1941. Other men of 580 AT Co died later in POW camps in Austria and are buried at Klagenfurt War Cemetery.

=== Disbandment ===
Three officers and 34 other ranks from Crete disembarked at Alexandria on 1 May to join 25 other ranks who had arrived direct from Greece. A few other stragglers rejoined from hospital or from Crete (one having been taken prisoner and then escaped) but, by the end of the month, the company was still 230 men short of its establishment. In June, GHQ Middle East ordered the unit to be disbanded on 1 July. Many of the officers and men were posted as reinforcements to 42nd Field Company, which had been almost destroyed on Crete.

== Postwar ==
When the TA was reconstituted in 1947, a new 580 Construction Squadron (regarded as the descendant of the Lancashire Fortress Engineers) formed at Liverpool as part of 130 Construction Regiment, the rest of the regiment coming from the former 55th (West Lancashire) Divisional Engineers. 130 Construction Rgt was disbanded in 1949 and 580 Squadron was reorganised as a field squadron and transferred to 107 Field Regiment at St Helens, another descendant of 55th Divisional Engineers. In 1961, 580 Sqn became an independent field park squadron, but it was disbanded in 1967 when the TA was converted into the TAVR.

== Honorary Colonel ==
- Major Robert Montgomery, VD, was appointed Hon Lt-Col Commandant on 28 May 1892, and Hon Colonel on 11 June 1904. He still held the post in the 1920s.

== External sources ==
- British Army units from 1945 on
- Commonwealth War Graves Commission
- Great War Forum
- New Zealand History
- Royal Engineers Museum
- Graham Watson, The Territorial Army 1947
