= 33rd (Lancashire and Cheshire) Signal Regiment =

- Cap Badge of 33rd (Lancashire and Cheshire) Signal Regiment
- Active: 1967–2009
- Country: United Kingdom
- Branch: Territorial Army
- Type: Royal Corps of Signals
- Role: Support regular army (ARRC) support
- Size: Four Squadrons
- Part of: 12 Signal Group; 42nd (North West) Brigade
- Garrison/HQ: HQ Squadron (55 Squadron) – Huyton; 59 Squadron – Liverpool; 42 Squadron – Manchester; 80 Squadron – Runcorn
- Motto(s): Certa Cito ("Swift and Sure")
- Colors: Sky Blue, Navy and Green (Air, Sea and Land)
- Mascot(s): Mercury ("Jimmy")

Insignia
- Tactical Recognition Flash

The 33rd (Lancashire and Cheshire) Signal Regiment was a British Territorial Army regiment of the Royal Corps of Signals.

== History ==
The regiment was originally a TAVR II (Territorial and Army Volunteer Reserve) unit created due to defence cuts, being formed on 1 April 1967 at Huyton, near Liverpool and consisting of four squadrons:

- HQ Squadron
- 42 (East Lancashire) Signal Squadron – successor to the 42nd (Lancashire and Cheshire) Signal Regiment
- 59 (West Lancashire) Signal Squadron – successor to the 59th Signal Regiment
- 80 (Cheshire Yeomanry) Signal Squadron – successor to the 80th Signal Regiment

In 1999, during the reforms implemented due to the Strategic Defence Review, the squadron subtitles, with the exception of 80 Squadron, were changed. They became:

- 55 (Merseyside) HQ Squadron
- 42 (City of Manchester) Signal Squadron
- 59 (City of Liverpool) Signal Squadron

== Disbandment ==
As a result of the strategic review of reserves it was announced on 28 April 2009 that the regiment was to be disbanded.

It was reduced to a single 33 Lancashire Signal Squadron, first in 32 Signal Regiment, then from 2014 in 37 Signal Regiment under the Army 2020 reorganisation. It continues to maintain 842 Signal Troop at Rusholme, Manchester.
