= Frontline Church =

Frontline Church, Liverpool
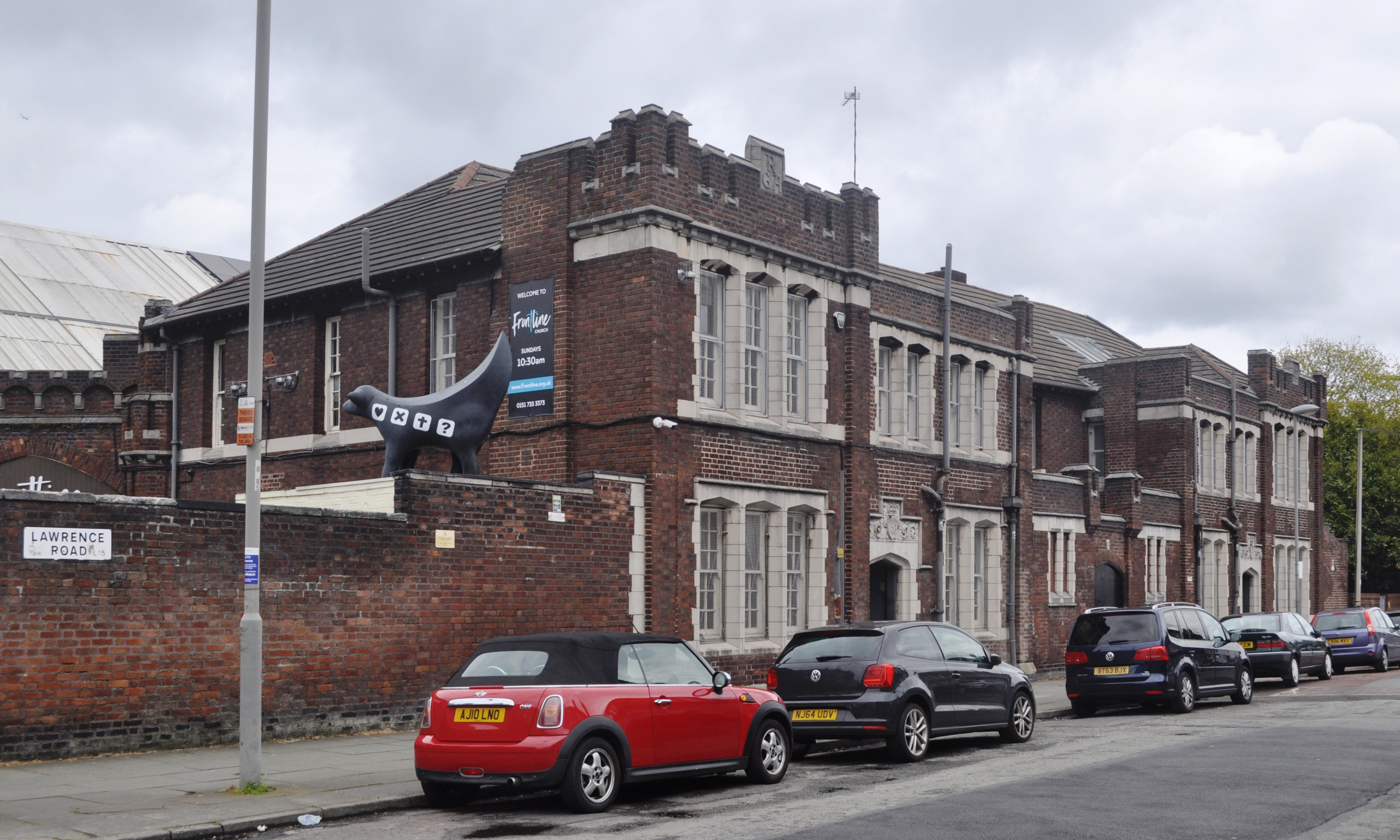
- The Lawrence Road façade of Frontline Church in April 2024
- Frontline Church, Liverpool
- 53°23′44.6″N 2°55′46.1″W
- OS grid reference: SJ 38290 89166
- Country: England
- Denomination: Independent
- Website: http://www.frontline.org.uk

History
- Founded: 1991

Frontline Church is an independent Christian church in Liverpool, England, affiliated to the Evangelical Alliance.

== Overview ==
The church has a site within Merseyside, in Wavertree. There are currently between 700 - 900 people that attend Frontline Church and a staff of about 30 people which includes church, youth and student workers, pastoral and administrative staff.

== History ==
=== The Early Years 1991-1995 ===
Frontline Church was founded in 1991 by Pastors Nic Harding and Dave Connolly when they joined their two congregations together.

In 1993 Dave Sharples founded Kids Klub, a modern-day Sunday school that set out to make church accessible and relevant to inner city kids. In 2012 Sharples was appointed an MBE in recognition of his 19 years of service to children and young people in Liverpool.

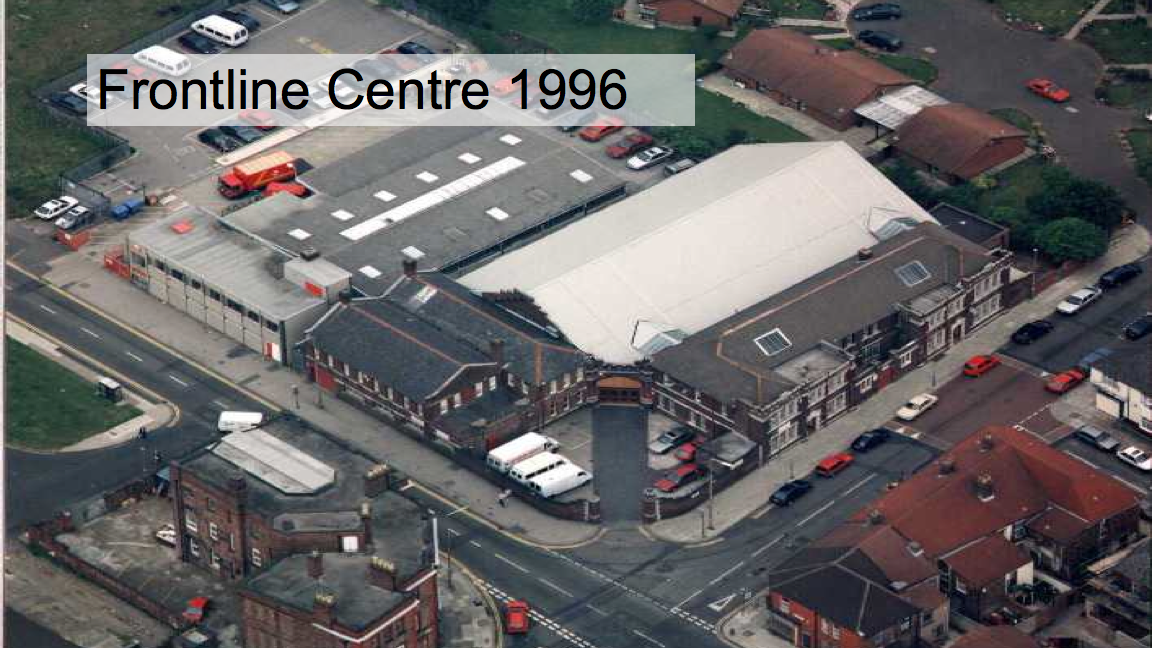

=== Wavertree Building 1996-2011 ===
In 1996, when Frontline had around 300 people in their congregation, they purchased an old army barracks in the area of Wavertree. This building was completely renovated and refurbished and was called the 'Frontline Centre'.

In 2010 Frontline Church was visited by Nick Clegg and Cherie Blair.

=== Planting new services 2012-2020 ===
In 2012 Frontline planted a new service in the City Centre of Liverpool, known as Frontline Central. This is now called Crowd Church, rebranded as an online church in 2020 due to the pandemic, and is part of the Frontline Church network.

== Imagine If Trust ==
Imagine If Trust is a partner charity of Frontline Church working to bring about transformation through a range of community projects.

Projects include a foodbank, a nursery, relationship education, supported housing and supporting training in DRC.
