= 1st Lancashire Engineers =

1st Lancashire Engineers Western Signal Companies 55th (West Lancashire) Divisional Signals 8th Army Signals 22 (West Lancashire) Corps Signals
- Active: 1860–present
- Country: United Kingdom
- Branch: Territorial Army
- Role: Field Engineering; Signals
- Part of: 55th (West Lancashire) Division; 59th (Staffordshire) Division; Eighth Army; 33 (Lancashire and Cheshire) Signal Regiment
- Garrison/HQ: Edge Hill, Liverpool; Childwall, Liverpool
- Engagements: Second Battle of El Alamein; Tunisian campaign; Allied invasion of Sicily; Italian campaign

The 1st Lancashire Engineer Volunteer Corps was a Volunteer unit of Britain's Royal Engineers, first raised in 1860. It went on to spin off a unit of fortress engineers and provided a signals training centre during the First World War. Its successor units provided signal support for West Lancashire Territorial Army (TA) formations in the early stages of the Second World War, and for Eighth Army HQ during the Second Battle of El Alamein, the advance to Tunis, invasion of Sicily and through Italy, ending the war in Austria. Postwar successor units have continued in the TA and Army Reserve to the present day.

== Origins ==
The enthusiasm for the Volunteer movement following an invasion scare in 1859 saw the creation of many Rifle, Artillery and Engineer Volunteer units composed of part-time soldiers eager to supplement the Regular British Army in time of need. One such unit was the 1st Lancashire Engineer Volunteer Corps (EVC) formed at Liverpool on 1 October 1860. In the early part of 1864, it absorbed the 2nd Lancashire EVC, which had been formed at Liverpool on 29 December 1860 (the 3rd Lancashire EVC at St Helens became the new 2nd). The unit ranked 4th (later 3rd) in the list of precedence of EVCs. By 1866, it consisted of eight companies, with its headquarters at 44 Mason Street, Edge Hill, Liverpool.

During the 1860s, the 1st Lancashire EVC acted as a battalion headquarters, with several smaller EVCs attached to it: 1st Flintshire EVC (1863–1897); 1st Cheshire EVC (1864) and 2nd (St Helens) Lancashire EVC (1864–1867). The Rossall School Cadet Corps – the oldest school cadet corps in the UK, founded in 1860 – was attached to the 1st Lancashire EVC from 1890 to 1908.

When Lieutenant-General Sir Andrew Clarke, Inspector-General of Fortifications 1882–1886, did not have enough Regular Royal Engineers (RE) to man the fixed mines being installed to defend British seaports, he utilised the Volunteer Engineers for this task. After successful trials, the system was rolled out to ports around the country. In October 1884, the 1st Lancashire EVC formed K Company to cover the Mersey Estuary; and in March 1888, this became independent as the Mersey Division Submarine Miners.

Again, when Clarke needed engineers for railway construction at the Red Sea port of Suakin for the British force engaged there in 1885, he sent a detachment of Volunteers to assist the Regulars. The detachment was drawn from the 1st Newcastle & Durham EV and the 1st Lancashire EV (seven men).

The EVC titles were abandoned in 1888, when the units became 'Engineer Volunteers, Royal Engineers', proclaiming their affiliation to the Regular RE, and then simply 'Royal Engineers (Volunteers)' in 1896.

The unit sent a detachment of 26 volunteers to assist the regular REs during the Second Boer War in 1901.

== Territorial Force ==
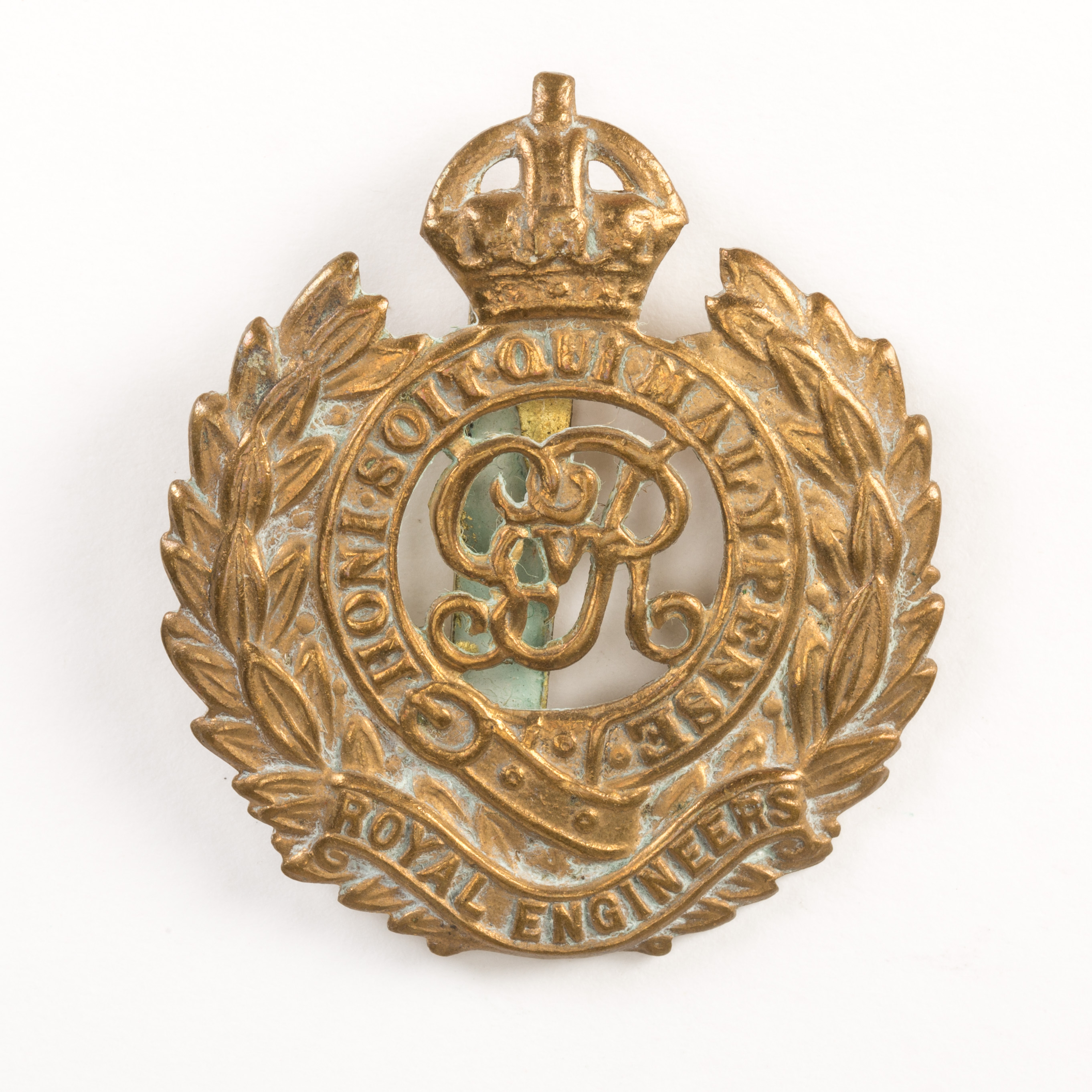
RE Cap badge (King George V cipher)

When the Volunteers were subsumed into the new Territorial Force (TF) in 1908, the original plan was for part of the 1st Lancashire RE (V) to join the Lancashire Fortress Royal Engineers formed by the former Mersey Submarine Miners, and the remainder of the unit would form the West Lancashire Divisional Telegraph Company.

By 1910, this plan had changed: none of the 1st Lancashire transferred to the fortress company, but the telegraph company had been expanded to form the Western Wireless Telegraph, Cable Telegraph and Air-Line Telegraph companies, collectively known as the Western Signal Companies. These were 'Army Troops', forming part of Western Command. By now the HQ was at 38 Mason Street.

The Commanding Officer of the companies from 1912 was Lt-Col F.A.Cortez-Leigh, transferred from a TF battalion of the Lancashire Fusiliers. In professional life, he was chief electrical engineer of the London and North Western Railway.

== First World War ==
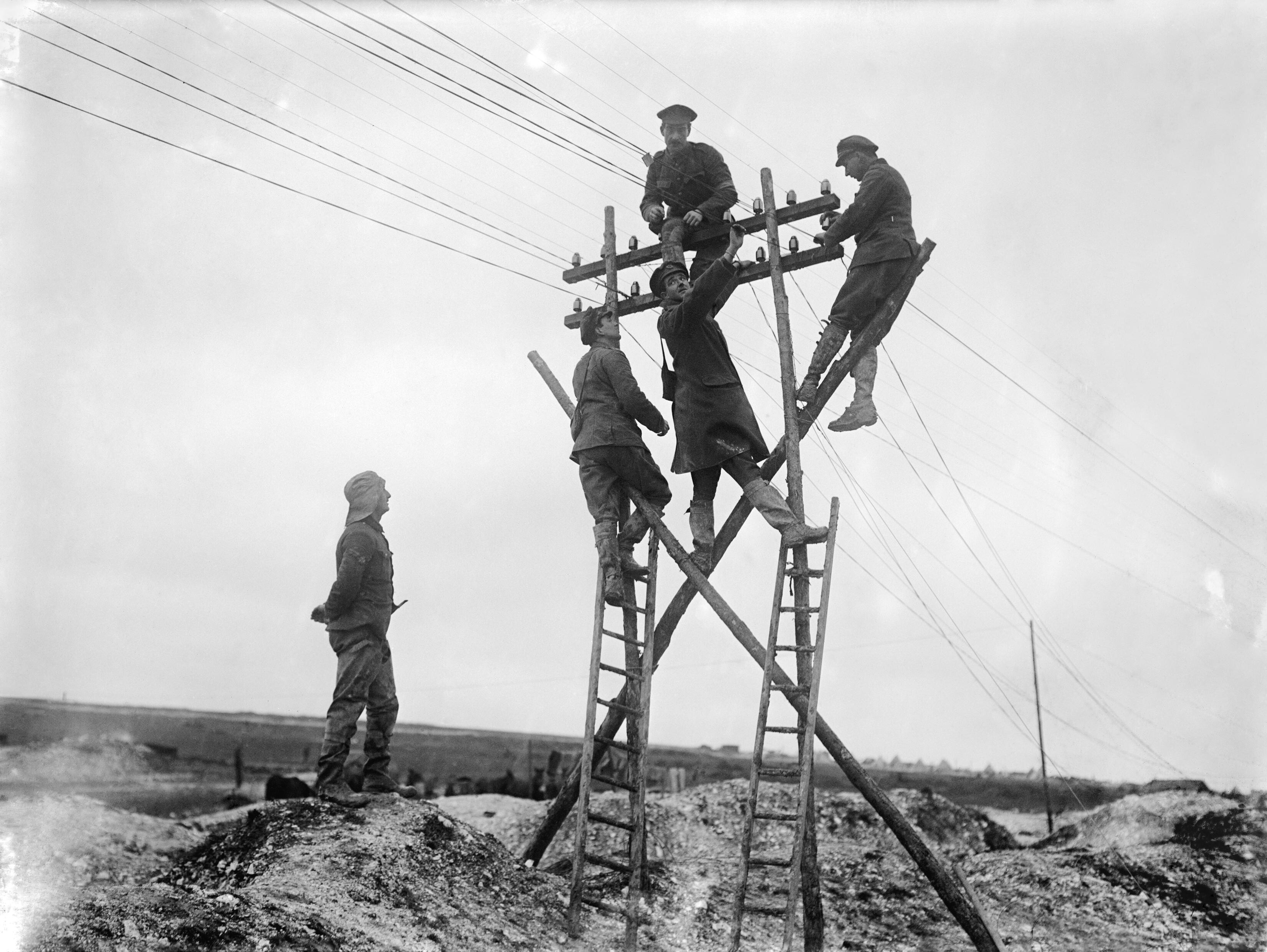
RE signallers repairing an air-line on the Western Front

=== Mobilisation ===
When war broke out in August 1914, the TF was mobilised and the Western Signal Companies were quickly recruited up to full strength. The unit established a training camp in the public park known as The Mystery at Wavertree. Almost the whole unit volunteered for overseas service, and it was quickly called upon to provide two cable telegraph sections and two motor air line telegraph sections to join the British Expeditionary Force serving on the Western Front. These sections left Wavertree and embarked for France on 26 October 1914.

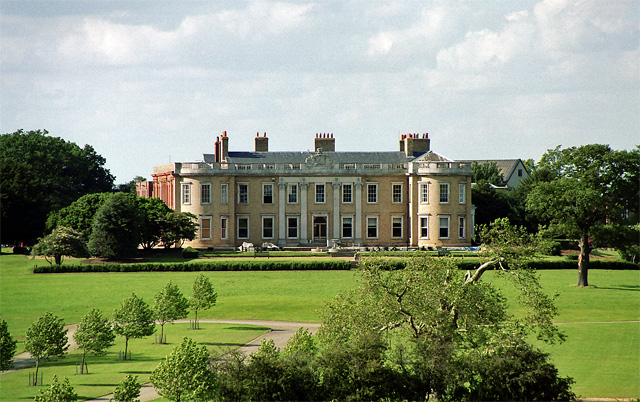
Haynes Park, where the Western Signal Companies established a training centre in 1914–1918

=== Training Centre ===
In the autumn of 1914, the War Office decided to address the urgent need for trained signallers by using the TF to establish training depots. The Army Troops signal units of the five Home Commands were concentrated in Bedfordshire, and the officers and men were transferred to the Regular RE for the duration of the war.

The Western Signal Companies became the Western Signal Service Centre, RE, based at the empty manor house at Haynes Park in Bedfordshire, with many of the men being billeted in nearby Clophill. The unit had to establish a complete depot in the park, with roads, huts, and electricity and water supplies.

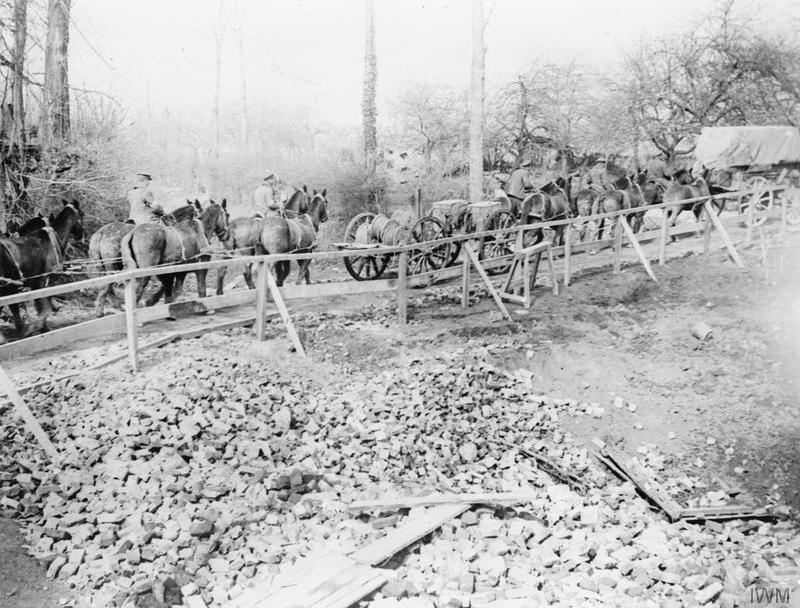
RE cable waggons on the Western Front

The training centre was later known as the Haynes Park Signal Depot, and remained under the command of Lt-Col Cortez-Leigh, who visited the Western Front in 1915 to see for himself the service conditions for which the men had to be trained. During the war, some 2,000–3,000 officers and 20,000 NCOs and men from across the UK, together with thousands of horses and mules, were trained at Haynes Park. Mrs Cortez-Leigh took charge of a detachment of women of Queen Mary's Army Auxiliary Corps at the park, which released men for active service.

== Interwar ==
When the TF was reconstituted in 1920 as the Territorial Army (TA), the RE signal units became part of the new Royal Corps of Signals. The Western Command units became 2nd Western Corps Signals (Army Troops), based at Liverpool. However, the concept of Army Troops signal companies was soon afterwards abandoned and the unit reformed later the same year as 55th (West Lancashire) Divisional Signals. (Note: During the First World War, the West Lancashire Division's RE, including the Divisional Signal Company, had been provided by 2nd (St Helens) Lancashire Engineers; they continued as the divisional RE in 1920.) The new unit was based at Mason Street, with No 2 Company at Prescot, and was commanded by Colonel J. Tennant. It also had 235th Field Artillery Signal Section and 210th Medium Artillery Signal Section attached to it. In 1937 a new drill hall named Signal House was opened at Score Lane, Childwall, Liverpool, and HQ moved in with Nos 1 and 3 Companies. In 1938, the unit provided the cadre for the new 4th AA Divisional Signals in Chester.

== Second World War ==
55th (West Lancashire) Divisional badge.

=== Mobilisation ===
Following the Munich Crisis, the TA was doubled in size. The 55th (West Lancashire) Infantry Division, which was organised as a Motor Division, spun off a duplicate, 59th (Staffordshire) Infantry Division, to which the signal unit provided 59th (Motor) Divisional Signals. The TA was mobilised in the days preceding the outbreak of war on 3 September 1939, and 59th Division and its units became active on 15 September.

=== 55th (West Lancashire) Divisional Signals ===
The 55th (West Lancashire) Division mobilised in Western Command. It remained in the UK throughout the war, moving from place to place. In June 1940, it was reorganised as a normal infantry division, and in January 1942 it was placed on a lower establishment. Although it was restored to full war establishment shortly before D Day, it never went overseas. 55th Divisional Signals acted as a training unit.

=== 59th (Motor) Divisional Signals ===
59th Division also mobilised in Western Command, but early in 1940 the divisional signal unit was withdrawn and reorganised as 4th Army Signals. (Note: A new 59th (Staffordshire) Divisional Signals was formed from 66th (Lancashire and Border) Divisional Signals when the second-line 66th Infantry Division was disbanded in June 1940.) It was redesignated again in May 1940 as No 4 Line of Communication Signals, and in September it was sent to the Middle East, where it operated in the rear areas of Western Desert Force and later Eighth Army during the Western Desert Campaign. It also provided signal detachments to British forces operating in Eritrea during the East African campaign and in Palestine during the Syria–Lebanon Campaign.

Eighth Army formation badge.

=== Eighth Army Signals ===
When Eighth Army HQ was formed in 1941, most of its administrative services, including signals, were provided by the South African Army. 4th LoC Signals supported these units, and in mid-1942 it took over completely from the South Africans when the bulk of the unit became 8th Army Signals, also providing personnel to XIII Corps Signals and East African Signals.

The unit served with Eighth Army HQ at the Battle of Alamein, the advance to Tunis, the Allied invasion of Sicily, and the whole of the Italian campaign. It ended the war in Austria, remaining there with the Army of Occupation until 1947, when its HQ and No 1 Squadron were disbanded. The rest of the unit was reorganised into the independent Klagenfurt and Vienna Signal Squadrons, and the Graz Signal Troop. In 1952, these were amalgamated into British Troops Austria Signals, which was reduced to a squadron in 1954 and disbanded in 1955.

==== Organisation ====
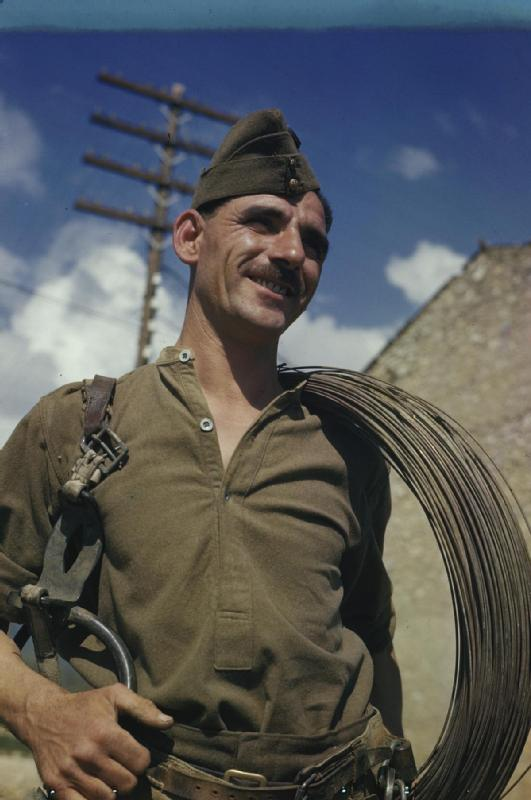
Signalman A. Johnson of P Line Section, No 1 Company, 8th Army Signals in Italy, April 1944.

In 1939–1945, an Army Signal unit had the following organisation:

- HQ
- 1 Company – for construction
  - two line-laying sections
  - one line maintenance section
- 2 Company – operating and maintenance
  - teletype section
  - wireless section
  - messenger section
  - technical maintenance section
- 3 Company – operating and maintenance
  - teletype section
  - wireless section
  - messenger section
  - technical maintenance section

By 1944, such was the volume of signal traffic that Army Signals had to be divided into two units, one for Main Army HQ and one for Rear Army HQ.

== Postwar ==
Royal Signals insignia (Queen Elizabeth II cipher)

55th (West Lancashire) Division was not reformed when the TA was reconstituted in 1947, but the Liverpool TA signals component did reform at Signals House as 22 (West Lancashire) Corps Signal Regiment. In 1949, the regiment became part of the Army Emergency Reserve (AER) (successors to the old Militia). Those TA members who chose not to accept the AER terms of service then became the nucleus of a new No 3 Squadron of 42 (Lancashire) Signal Regiment at Signal House. The AER regiment was disbanded about 1953. (Note: Not all the modern sources agree on the lineal succession of units after the Second World War; this article follows the earliest authoritative source.)

The former second-line 59th Divisional Signals also reformed in Liverpool, in 1947, as 59 Mixed Signal Regiment ('Mixed' indicating that members of the Women's Royal Army Corps were integrated into the unit). When the TA was reduced to the Territorial and Army Volunteer Reserve (TAVR) in 1967, the regiment became 59 (West Lancashire) Signal Squadron in 33 (Lancashire and Cheshire) Signal Regiment based at Huyton (which also included 42 Signal Squadron from the former 42 (Lancashire) Signal Rgt).

At the same time, a new 55 (Thames and Mersey) Squadron was formed in TAVR I (the 'ever-ready' portion of the reserves). It consisted of a HQ at Liverpool, an Airhead Troop at Chelsea, London, and a Port Troop at Cardiff. The London troop left in 1970, when the squadron was renamed 55 (West Lancashire) Signal Squadron. A radio relay troop at Liverpool joined in 1972 and the Cardiff troop left in 1983. The squadron operated in the logistic support role until it was disbanded in February 1999.

On 16 February 1999, the titles of 33 (L&C) Signal Regiment's squadrons were changed, 59 becoming 59 (City of Liverpool) Signal Squadron and HQ Squadron becoming 55 (Merseyside) HQ Squadron. 33 (L&C) Signal Regiment was reduced to a single squadron after the 2009 Defence Review.

== Commanding Officers ==
Unit commanders included the following:

55th (West Lancashire) Divisional Signals:

- Lt-Col J. Tennant, DSO, TD, 1920
- Col W.T. Dodd, DSO, TD, 1927
- Lt-Col R. Baron, OBE, TD, 1935
- Lt-Col E.J.F. Higgs, 1942
- Lt-Col A.E. Taylor, OBE, 1944
- Lt-Col R.C.B. Stuart, 1945

59th Motor Divisional Signals:

- Lt-Col R.W. Bailey, TD, 1939
- No 4 Line of Communication Signals:
- Lt-Col R.W. Bailey, TD, 1940
- Lt-Col B.B. Kennett, MBE, 1941
- Lt-Col C. Knowles, OBE, 1942
- Lt-Col W.A. Peachell, 1942
- Lt-Col T.A. Darling, 1942

8th Army Signals:

- Lt-Col W.A. Peachell, 1942
- Lt-Col R.H.E. Robinson, 1944
- Lt-Col W.J. Morris, MC, 1944
- Lt-Col F.W. Stoneman, MBE, 1945
- Lt-Col C.H. Lyddon, 1946–1947
- British Troops Austria Signals
- Lt-Col P.M.P. Hobson, DSO 1952
- Maj T.M. Moon, 1954–1955

22 Corps Signal Regiment:

- Lt-Col A. Ellison, MBE, TD, 1947
- Lt-Col R.F. Knight, TD, 1951
- Lt-Col R.J. Mitchell, TD, 1953

== Honorary Colonel ==
The following officers served as Honorary Colonel of the 1st Lancashire EVC and successor units:

- Field Marshal Sir John Fox Burgoyne, appointed 29 October 1861.
- Lt-Col Christopher O. Ellison, VD, former commanding officer, appointed 30 July 1878.
- Col John F. Robinson, VD, appointed 10 January 1906.
- Lt-Col S.M. Newell, DSO, OBE, TD, appointed 23 February 1929.
- Col W.T. Dodd, DSO, TD, appointed 23 February 1935.

== External sources ==
- Mark Conrad, The British Army, 1914.
- Lancashire Record Office, Handlist 72
- London Gazette.
- Merseyside Roll of Honour.
- Maj I.G. Kelly, 42 Signal Squadron History (archive site)
- Orders of Battle at Patriot Files
- Land Forces of Britain, the Empire and Commonwealth – Regiments.org (archive site)
- Graham Watson, The Territorial Army 1947
