= Drill hall =

Building where soldiers perform military drills

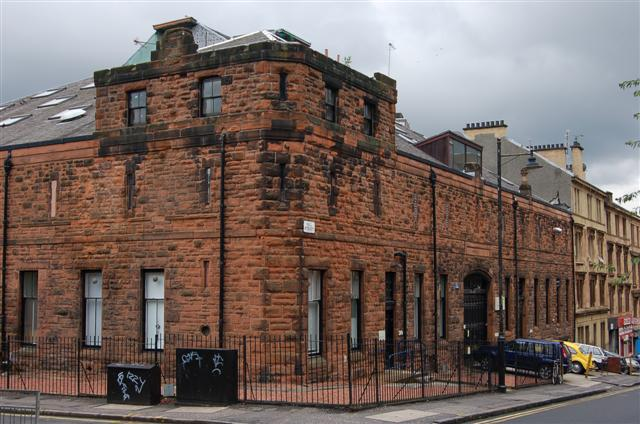
The former drill hall of the 5th/6th Battalion, The Highland Light Infantry at Garnethill, Glasgow, which formed the 52nd Lowland Volunteers in 1967. It is now known as the Haldane Building and is used by the Glasgow School of Art.

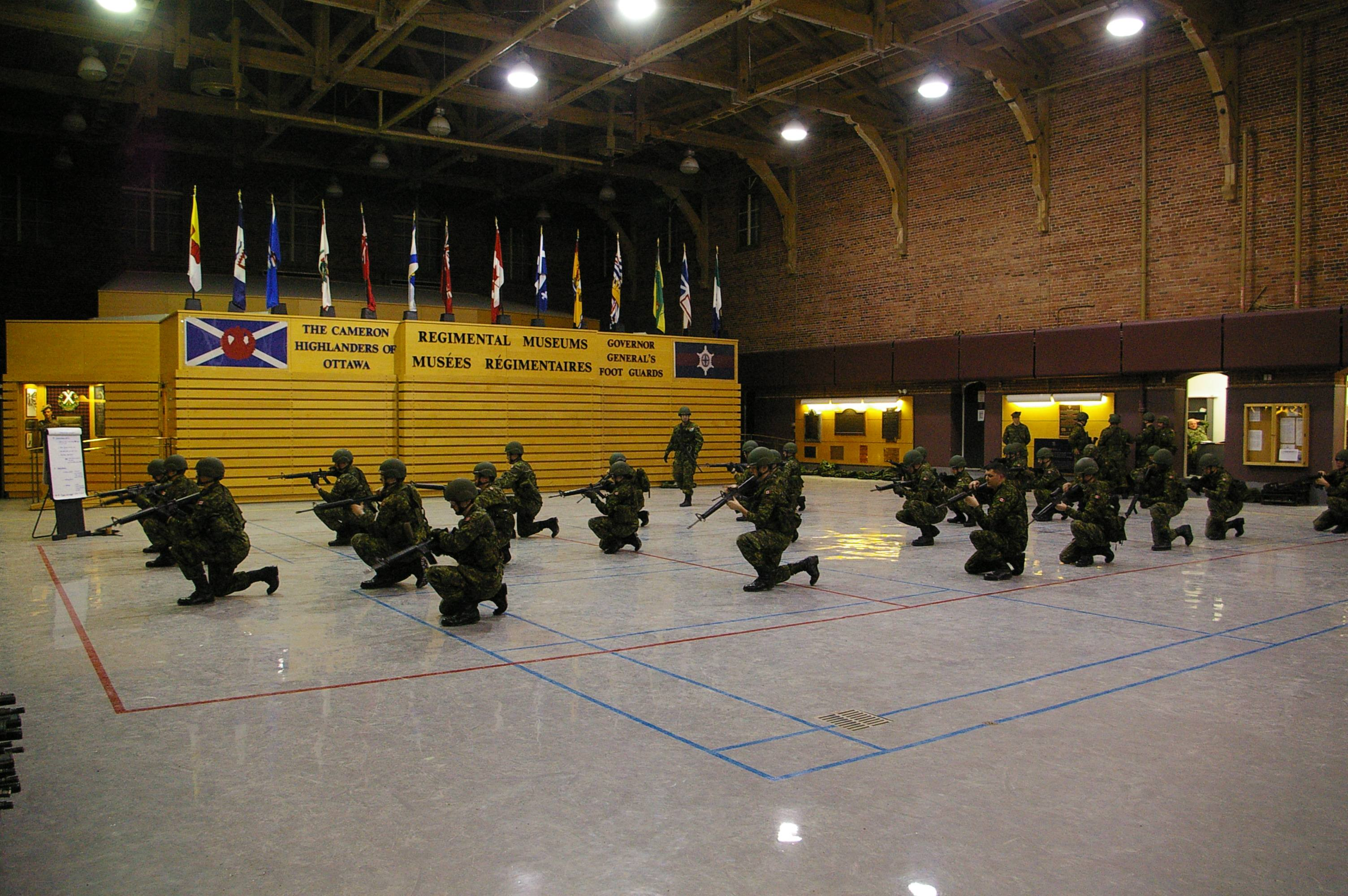
Canadian soldiers undertake weapons training in a drill hall in January 2007.

A drill hall is a place such as a building or a hangar where soldiers practise and perform military drills.

== Description ==
In the United Kingdom and Commonwealth, the term was used for the whole headquarters building of a military reserve unit, which usually incorporated such a hall. Many of these drill halls were built through public subscriptions in order to support the local Volunteer Force which was raised in the late 1850s.

In the United Kingdom, these were later renamed Territorial Army (TA) Centres and later Army Reserve Centres (ARC)s. As well as a drill hall itself, they now usually feature other facilities such as a gymnasium, motor transport department, lecture rooms, stores, an armoury, administrative offices and the Officer's, Warrant Officers and Senior NCOs, and Junior Ranks Messes. Some Officer Training Corps, Army Cadet Force and Air Training Corps units are also co-located on the site of modern Army Reserve Centres, for example Blackheath drill hall.

Over 1,860 drill halls have been documented in England, with Historic England estimating that around 1,500 were extant in 2015. Fifteen purpose built drill halls are Grade II listed on the National Heritage List for England, dating from 1864 to 1907. The Grade II listed former Drill Hall on York Road, Great Yarmouth was built for the 2nd Volunteer Battalion Norfolk Regiment in 1867. Other drill halls were converted from extant buildings, including the now demolished St Nicholas Drill Hall in King's Lynn in Norfolk.

== See also ==
- National Guard Armory
- List of drill halls in Merseyside
